= Cecilia Morse =

American pioneer and citrus farmer (1838–1926)

Charcila Cecilia Moore (June 3, 1838 – June 13, 1926) was a pioneer of Catholic education in Florida and a citrus farmer. She was born in Anahuac, Texas and educated in Baltimore. She was married to attorney Charles Nathan Morse (son of Louisiana politician, Isaac Edward Morse) for 16 years until his death in 1881. She was the foundress of St. Anthony Catholic School, the oldest parochial school in what is now the Diocese of St. Petersburg, the oldest school of any kind in Pasco County, and one of the oldest Catholic schools in Florida.

== St. Anthony of Padua Catholic School ==
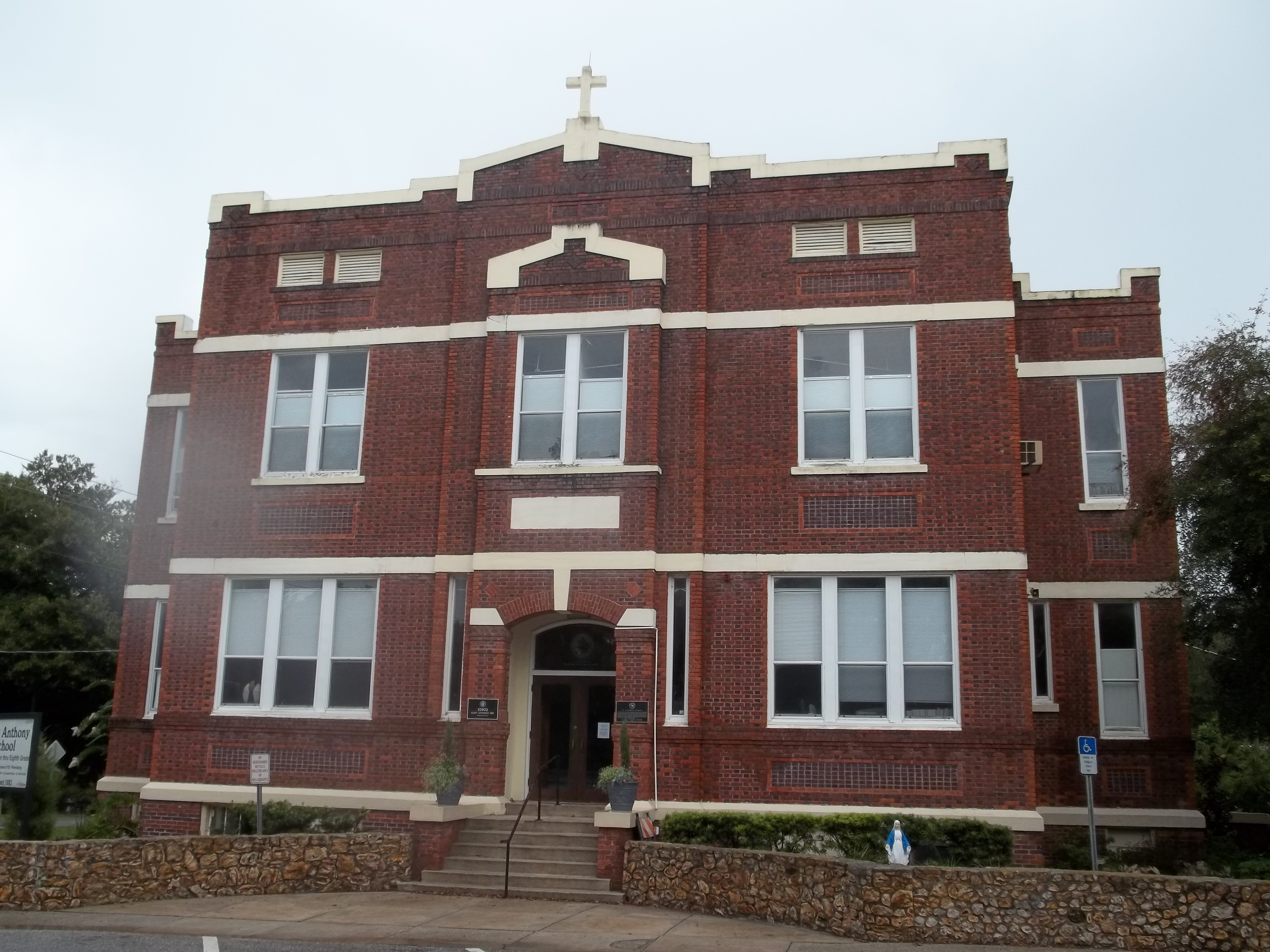
St. Anthony Catholic School, est 1884 as it appeared in 2011

After her husband's death, Morse moved to the Catholic colony of San Antonio, Florida in 1883 to try her hand at farming. Upon arrival the young widow was dismayed to find that there was no school for her six surviving children to attend. Colony founder Judge Edmund Dunne tried to appease her by telling her that once more settlers arrived, a school would be built. Mrs. Morse famously retorted "The minds of the children now here won't wait for more settlers." Morse first began teaching out of her home to fourteen students, including her own six children. With the support of visiting priest Fr. E.J. Dunne (who himself would later become a bishop) classes were moved into the town church on April 29, 1884. By November of that same year the first St. Anthony of Padua School building, a 12' x 24' frame structure, opened with funds donated by Bishop John Moore. Morse continued teaching at St. Anthony until the Benedictine Sisters arrived in 1889 to take over the growing school. Among those first fourteen pupils was a nephew of the town's founder, who went on to become the first American Trappist abbot, Dom Frederic Dunne. Dom Frederic is more highly regarded as the person responsible for encouraging Thomas Merton to write what would eventually become The Seven Storey Mountain among numerous other titles, while both were at The Abbey of Our Lady of Gethsemani in Kentucky.

== After teaching ==
With the school fully staffed by nuns Mrs. Morse returned to farming full-time. As happened to a great many other Florida farmers of that era, the Great Freeze of 1894–95 wiped out her entire citrus crop. This unfortunate circumstance forced her to eventually convey her property to nearby St. Leo College to cover her youngest son's educational expenses. With nothing left in San Antonio, and after a brief stay in St. Petersburg, she moved her family to Tampa where she lived for the next 26 years. Her children were Ethel Morse (1866 – 1867), who died in infancy, Malcolm Edward Morse (1867 – 1918), Charles Colegate Morse (1870 – 1913), Ethel Mary Morse (1872 – 1948), Evangeline St. John Morse (1874 – 1952), Cecilia Marie Morse (1876 – 1902), and Francis "Frank" Pius Van Pradellas Morse (1878 – 1956), a World War I veteran buried at Arlington National Cemetery.

== Death ==
Morse died in 1926 on the feast day of St. Anthony of Padua, June 13 in Tampa, Florida and is buried in the Catholic portion (St Louis Cemetery) of Oaklawn Cemetery in downtown Tampa, surrounded by 5 of her 7 children. The whereabouts of her grave was a long-time mystery until it was accidentally re-discovered by Diocese of St. Petersburg historian, and St. Anthony Catholic School alumnus, Fr. Len Plazewski in September 2009, while he was researching the graves of five pioneer priests of Florida.
