= Tierra Del Sol Preserve =

180-acre area of protected land

Coordinates: 28.2912°N 82.5091°W

Tierra Del Sol Preserve is a 180-acre area of protected land one mile west of Land o' Lakes Boulevard (US 41) and two miles south of State Road 52 at 9855 Asbel Road in Land o' Lakes, Florida. It is closed for restoration at present and was acquired in 2010 to protect a section of the Five Mile Creek wildlife corridor. As of 2013, wetlands in the preserve were being restored and enhanced.
