= Holy Name Monastery =

Benedictine monaster in Saint Leo, Florida

Coordinates: 28°19′59″N 82°15′55″W

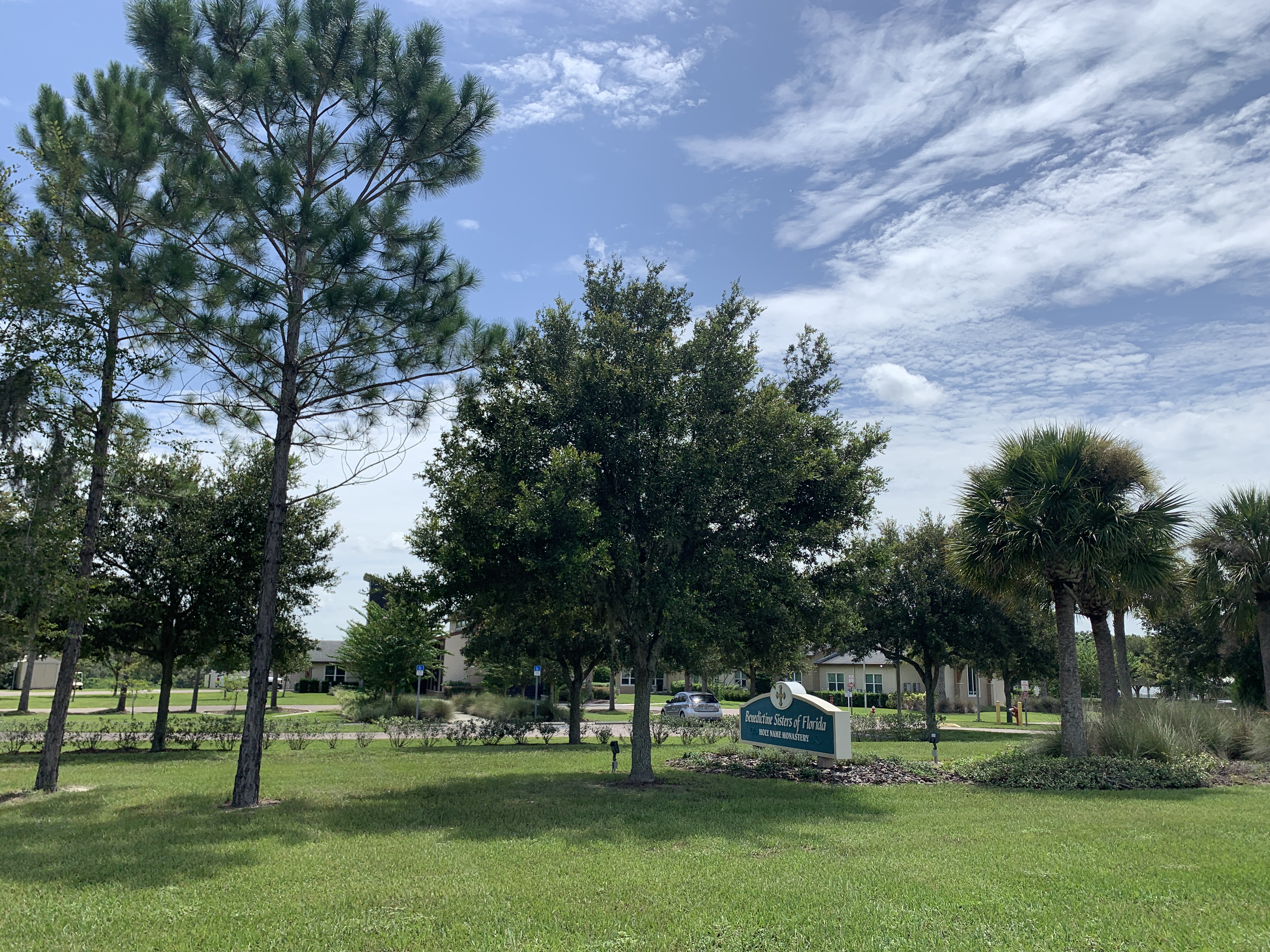
Holy Name Monastery

Holy Name Monastery is a Roman Catholic Benedictine women's monastery located in Saint Leo, Florida, owned and operated by the Benedictine Sisters of Florida. It was known first as Holy Name Convent and then as Holy Name Priory before taking its current name in the 1990s.

== History ==
In 1889 five sisters arrived in Florida from Elk County, Pennsylvania. They founded Holy Name Convent and Holy Name Academy in response to a need for teachers for the children of German immigrants in the San Antonio-St. Joseph area of Pasco County, Florida. Upon their arrival the nuns also took over the administration of both St. Anthony School and St. Joseph School.

Both the convent and the "all-girls" academy boarding school were originally housed in the previously-unused Sultenfuss Hotel, a large, three-story building located in San Antonio on the north end of the city's 4 acre town square. The building was moved in the summer of 1911, by an elaborate system of ox-powered pulleys and winches, a half mile east, to a hill on 45 acres that overlooked the southeastern shore of Lake Jovita in the town of Saint Leo. As both religious vocations and enrollment in the academy grew, one of the earliest concrete block structures in Florida, St. Scholastica Hall, was built on the property in 1912 to serve as classroom space. St. Benedict’s Preparatory School, which served elementary and middle-school boys, was opened from 1929 to 1959. Over the years the Benedictine Sisters of Florida also administered and staffed numerous mission schools throughout the state of Florida and beyond.

In 1961 a new 100,000 square-foot concrete block complex replaced the original wooden "hotel" structure. In 1964 Holy Name Academy and the nearby "all-boys" St. Leo College Preparatory School, which was run by Benedictine monks from St. Leo Abbey, both closed to make way for St. Leo College. In 1978, St. Scholastica Hall was condemned and taken down. For the most part, the nuns' presence at St. Joseph School remained until it closed its doors in 1981.

St. Anthony School, which is still the oldest school of any kind in Pasco County, had a continuing Benedictine/Holy Name presence for 121 years, until the end of the 2009–10 school year. In August 2014 the Benedictine Sisters moved into a new 28,000 square-foot monastery across SR-52 on ten hilltop acres along Wichers Road in Saint Leo.

As of 2018, 14 sisters, plus two in formation, live at Holy Name Monastery according to the Rule of St. Benedict. Following Benedictine tradition, the sisters seek a balance of prayer and work, community and solitude, an integration of contemplative living and active ministry on behalf of others. The monastery hosts retreats. Sister Roberta Bailey, O.S.B., is the current Prioress as elected by the monastery members.
