= St. Joseph, Pasco County, Florida =

Unincorporated community in Florida, U.S.

Coordinates: 28°22′33″N 82°17′12″W

St. Joseph
- Interactive map of St. Joseph
- Country: United States
- State: Florida
- County: Pasco
- GNIS feature ID: 290243

Saint Joseph, commonly referred to as St. Joe, is an unincorporated community in Pasco County, Florida, United States. It was originally settled as a German Catholic community. It is located in the northeastern part of Pasco County in Central Florida a few miles north of San Antonio and Saint Leo University. Saint Joseph also claims to be the "kumquat capital of the world" for its production of the citrus fruit. Because of this, nearby Dade City hosts the annual Kumquat Festival. The community is also home to Sacred Heart Catholic Church, the third oldest parish in the Diocese of St. Petersburg.

== History ==
The area that became St. Joe was originally an unnamed satellite community of the Catholic colony of San Antonio, in what was then southern Hernando County. Judge Edmund F. Dunne was a legal counsel involved in the Disston Land Purchase of 1881, and as his commission, received 100,000 choice acres (400 km2) of land out of the 4,000,000 acre (16,000 km^{2}) purchase. The following year, while surveying the Disston Purchase, Judge Dunne selected the location for San Antonio, settling it as the center of a haven for Catholics in Florida. Most of the original colonists were of Irish and French lineage.

Beginning in 1883 with Bernard A. Barthle, numerous German-immigrant families steadily moved to the greater colony. For the first few years the area was commonly known as Barthle Settlement and Barthle Crossing, after the pioneer family's adjoining homesteads. In 1888, the name St. Joseph, which was a homage to Barthle's first "American" hometown of St. Joseph, Minnesota, came into regular use.

Judge Dunne mapped out, platted and established numerous villages surrounding San Antonio, including St. Thomas, Villa Maria, Carmel and San Felipe, but only St. Joseph survives today. In 1889 the Benedictines established the nearby monastery of St. Leo and St. Leo College on Dunne's former homestead and farm land, later incorporating the area as part of a separate town called St. Leo. The first Benedictine's arrival was a direct result of the colony's rapidly growing German-immigrant population, and their desire to have a German-speaking priest. Though the area for St. Leo was also platted by Dunne, it did not actually receive its name until after the arrival of the Benedictine monks.

On land donated by the Nathe family, St. Joseph School (later called St. Joe Elementary) operated beside Sacred Heart Church from September 1881 until it was closed in 1981 by the Pasco School Board. It was replaced by the much larger San Antonio Elementary about 2 miles away that same year. On October 15, 1984, and using the same buildings, Sacred Heart Early Childhood Center opened its doors with 7 children enrolled. Today, with greatly expanded and enhanced facilities, it serves over 150 children ranging from age 6 weeks to 12 years old, and is operated under the Diocese of St. Petersburg.
