= Faustinus and Jovita =

Christian martyrs (died 120)

Saints Jovita and Faustinus
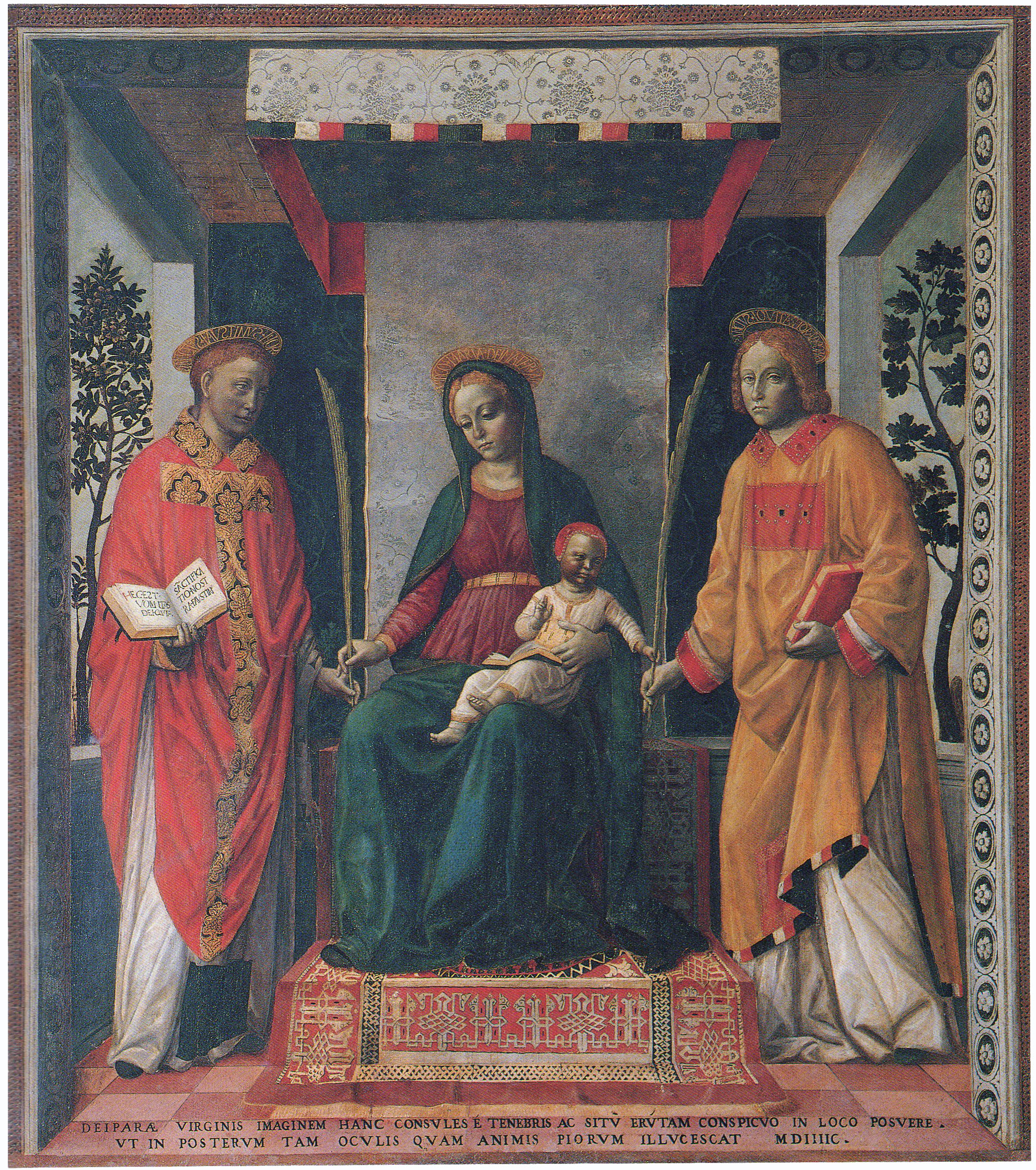
- Virgin Mary and Christ Child with Saints Jovita and Faustinus, by Vincenzo Foppa

Martyrs
- Born: Brixia, Italia, Roman Empire
- Died: 120 AD; Brixia, Italia, Roman Empire
- Venerated in: Catholic Church; Eastern Orthodox Church
- Feast: 15 February
- Attributes: depicted as two knightly brothers holding the palms of martyrdom. Sometimes only Jovita is shown, richly dressed and on horseback; an angel may be shown saving them from drowning; sometimes shown with Faustinus of Brescia
- Patronage: Brescia

Jovita and Faustinus were said to be Christian martyrs under Hadrian, traditionally held to have died in 120 AD. Together, they are patron saints of the Italian city of Brescia. Faustinus is the patron saint of Pietradefusi.

== Traditional vita ==
Tradition states that they were members of a noble family of Brixia (present-day Brescia, Lombardy, northern Italy). Jovinus, the older brother, was a preacher; Faustinus, a deacon. For their fearless preaching of the Gospel, they were arraigned before the Roman Emperor Hadrian, who at Brixia, Rome and Neapolis, subjected them to frightful torments, after which they were beheaded at Brixia in the year 120. That is the date accepted by the Bollandists, while the historian Paul Allard (Histoire des Persécutions pendant les Deux Premiers Siècles, Paris, 1885) gives the year as 118.

Their Acts were compiled by Faustinus of Brescia, a bishop of Brescia said to be a descendant.

== Veneration ==
The many so-called "Acts" are predominantly the fancy of legend. The Jesuit Fedele Savio questioned nearly every detail handed down, other than that they had been martyred. This is amply attested by their inclusion in so many of the early martyrologies and their extraordinary cult in their native city, where from time immemorial they have been the chief patrons. Savio emphasizes that the saints are not to be confused with the fabulous figures in the Acts.

It is believed that they were martyred at a site that either was, or later became, a Roman cemetery. A church was built there called Santi Faustino e Giovita ad sanguinem. Its dedication was later changed to Saint Afra; Saint Afra's was destroyed during the bombing in World War II

Their traditional joint feast day on 15 February was inserted into the General Roman Calendar. It was deleted in 1969, because their "Acts are completely fabulous, treating Jovita as a preacher, although she was a woman and a man was Faustinus." The two saints remain listed in the Roman Martyrology, the official, though professedly incomplete, list of the saints recognized by the Catholic Church. The cities of Rome, Bologna, Verona, Pietradefusi and Malečnik share with Brescia possession of their relics.

Modern tradition considers the feast of Saint Faustinus (also known as Faustine) to be the "Anti-Valentine's" Day, although he actually protects people who are single by choice, as well as those not in relationships to avoid unhealthy ones and wait for a good partner.

Various reasons are given for this link to single persons:

1. The respective dies natales (heavenly birthday) of the Saints Valentine and Saint Faustinus are celebrated on successive dates, despite all three martyrdoms happening in different years (viz., the two Valentines between 120 and 134, and Faustinus in 273);
2. In various languages, the names of the saints are assonant (Valentin-Faustin, Valentine-Faustine, Valentino-Faustino,...etc);
3. The Latin etymology of the name Faustinus, considered auspicious, makes him a patron and protector of those seeking love, trusting in a future relationship with some healthy patience.

== Cultural legacy ==
A lake partly in the town of St. Leo, Florida has been called Lake Jovita since its discovery by Judge Edmund F. Dunne on February 15, 1882. The nearby community of San Antonio changed its name to Lake Jovita in 1927 before reverting in 1933.

== Sources and external links ==
- Faustinus at Patron Saints Index
- Saint of the Day, February 15: Jovita and Faustinus at SaintPatrickDC.org
- (in Italian) San Faustino
