= M. Daniel Henry =

American academic (1940–2014)

Martin Daniel Henry (1940 – January 16, 2014) was a Catholic university administrator, the president of Saint Leo University, Florida, United States, from 1985 to 1987 and of Gannon University from 1987 to 1991. As president at Gannon, he presided over a merger with the nearby Villa Maria College.

Prior to his work at Saint Leo University, Henry was the Vice President for Administration at the University of Dayton. Following his position at Gannon he became an assistant to Milwaukee archbishop Rembert Weakland.
