= Florida State Road 52 =

Highway in Florida, US

State Road 52
- Schrader Memorial Highway; McCabe Road; Clinton Avenue
- SR 52 highlighted in red, CR 52 highlighted in blue

Route information
- Maintained by FDOT
- Length: 32.03 mi (51.55 km)
- Existed: 1945 renumbering (definition)–present

Major junctions
- West end: US 19 in Bayonet Point
- SR 589 in Shady Hills; US 41 in Gowers Corner; I-75 in Pasco
- East end: US 98 / US 301 in Dade City

Location
- Country: United States
- State: Florida
- Counties: Pasco

Highway system
- Florida State Highway System; Interstate; US; State; Former; Pre‑1945; Toll; Scenic
← SR 51	→ SR 53

State Road 52 (SR 52) is the major east–west road through northern Pasco County, Florida. The road begins in Bayonet Point at US 19 (SR 55), passes south of San Antonio and St. Leo, and terminates on the south side of Dade City at US 98 and US 301.

== Route description ==
SR 52 exists primarily as a six-lane commercial strip between US 19 and Moon Lake Road. In 2007, the road was widened to six lanes between Moon Lake Road and SR 589 (Suncoast Parkway), but most of the development taking place here has been residential so far. On the Southeast corner of the Suncoast Parkway interchange are a former Florida State Police barracks which included a Florida Division of Forestry fire tower. The road narrows down to four lanes as it enters Fivay Junction and approaches Shady Hills Road before crossing the Pithlachascotee River. As the road runs along the north side of some agricultural land, it eventually meets with a railroad crossing and then passes a sawmill before encountering US 41 (SR 45) at a section of Pasco County which is known as Gowers Corner. Plans to widen SR 52 near US 41 include the realignment of both roads.

East of US 41 is a community known as the Pilot Country Estates Airport, where residents have their private airplanes. Beyond that, most of the features surrounding SR 52 consist of fledgling farmland and little lakes. At least one other gated community exists east of this point. Other sites along this segment include the former Dirt Devil's Speedway and a concrete factory on the southwest corner of CR 583 (Ehren Cutoff). A winery was established at some point in the early 21st Century, and a model aviation club existed in one of two locations along this road segment.

After a pair of bridges over two dry creeks, SR 52 encounters Bellamy Brothers Boulevard (CR 581 North), which leads drivers north through farms and woods before entering the Brooksville. Meanwhile, SR 52 climbs a hill and then drops before approaching the Pasco County Juvenile Detention Center. Almost immediately, the road enters the unincorporated hamlet of Pasco as it crosses a former railroad right-of-way that once ran from St. Petersburg to Trilby. The interchange with I-75 (exit 285) is easily visible before reaching the former grade crossing, but not without approaching a gated community and two truck stops.

Immediately after the I-75 interchange, SR 52 passes by an industrial park and Recreational Vehicle dealership. Continuing east, SR 52 bisects the Mirada development before intersecting CR 577 (Curley Road) immediately south of San Antonio. South of St. Leo, SR 52 curves northeast to avoid Williams Cemetery before intersecting with CR 579 (Prospect Road) on the southeast side of the town. Continuing east from this intersection as Clinton Avenue, SR 52 then proceeds to curve back southeast before curving back east again through the small residential community of Lake Pasadena Heights and Clinton Heights before terminating at an intersection with US 98 and US 301 on the south side of Dade City.

== History ==
The current Florida State Road 52 was established during the great renumbering of 1945, as a replacement for the original Florida State Road 210 from Bayonet Point to Dade City. Beyond Dade City, Old SR 210 continued along overlaps with today's US 301 to Lacoochee, Pasco and Hernando CR 575 to Ridge Manor, current SR 50 to Mabel, Sumter CR 469 to Center Hill, and Sumter and Lake CRs 48 and later CR 33 in Okahumpka.

Former segments of SR 52, have included Roth Lane, in Saint Leo, and North 21st Street and Lock Street in Dade City.

To address recent growth in Pasco County, SR 52 was realigned onto a 7-mile (11 km), four-lane, divided highway alignment south of the previous winding two-lane highway alignment through San Antonio and St. Leo, between I-75 and US 98 and US 301. It opened to traffic on February 17, 2023, costing $82 million. The former alignment was transferred to Pasco County as County Road 52 (CR 52).

== Major intersections ==
The entire route is in Pasco County.

Location	mi	km	Destinations	Notes
Bayonet Point	0.000	0.000	US 19 (SR 55) – Port Richey, St. Petersburg, Hudson	
	2.012	3.238	CR 1 (Little Road) – New Port Richey	
	6.162	9.917	CR 587 west (Moon Lake Road) – Pasco-Hernando Community College	
Shady Hills	9.33	15.02	SR 589 (Suncoast Parkway) – Brooksville, Tampa	SR 589 exit 27
Gowers Corner	12.438	20.017	US 41 (SR 45) – Masaryktown, Land o' Lakes	
	17.823	28.683	CR 583 south (Ehren Cutoff) – State Veterans Nursing Home, Land o' Lakes	
	21.393	34.429	CR 581 north (Bellamy Brothers Boulevard) – Darby	
	21.41	34.46	Levi Loop (SR 5050 north) / Old Tampa Bay Drive (SR 5052 south)	
Pasco	23.43	37.71	I-75 (SR 93) – Ocala, Tampa, St. Petersburg	I-75 exit 285
Pasco			CR 52 east	Former segment of SR 52
	26.53	42.70	CR 577 (Curley Road) – St. Joseph, Zephyrhills	
St. Leo	28.93	46.56	CR 579 (Prospect Road)	
Dade City			CR 41 (Fort King Road)	
Dade City	32.03	51.55	US 98 / US 301	
1.000 mi = 1.609 km; 1.000 km = 0.621 mi

== Related routes ==
=== County Road 52A ===
County Road 52 Alternate
- Location: St. Leo–Dade City
- Length: 1.5 mi (2.4 km)

County Road 52 Alternate (CR 52 Alt) is the bannered route of SR 52 south of Dade City. It began at an intersection with CR 579 on the southeast corner of St. Leo just south of the intersection with the former alignment of SR 52 and ran east along Clinton Street through the communities of Lake Pasadena Heights and Clinton Heights before encountering the intersection with US 98 and US 301 on the south side of Dade City. The route continues east of there just outside of the city limits and terminates at CR 35 Alternate (Old Lakeland Highway).

The segment between CR 579 and US 98-301 was incorporated into SR 52 following its realignment on February 17, 2023. The segment east of US 98-301 still exists.

The entire route is in Pasco County.

Location	mi	km	Destinations	Notes
St. Leo	0.0	0.0	CR 579 (Prospect Road)	Former western terminus of CR 52A; currently SR 52
Dade City			CR 41 (Fort King Road)	Former SR 41
Dade City	3.1	5.0	US 98 / US 301	Eastern terminus of SR 52; current western terminus of CR 52A
	4.6	7.4	CR 35 Alt. (Old Lakeland Highway)	Eastern terminus of CR 52A
1.000 mi = 1.609 km; 1.000 km = 0.621 mi: Closed/former; Route transition

=== County Road 52 ===
County Road 52
- Location: San Antonio–Dade City
- Length: 9.0 mi (14.5 km)
- History: Commissioned on February 17, 2023

County Road 52 (CR 52) is a county route of SR 52 between west of San Antonio and Dade City. It is a former alignment of SR 52 before its realignment to a 7-mile (11 km) four-lane divided highway segment to the south. It begins at an intersection with SR 52 west of its intersection with Mirada Boulevard, diverging to the northeast. It then proceeds to run east through San Antonio and St. Leo before running northeast and entering Dade City, where it turns north and becomes 21st Street, before turning right onto Meridian Avenue and running east through Downtown Dade City before terminating at an intersection with US 98 and US 301.

The entire route is in Pasco County.

Location	mi	km	Destinations	Notes
	0.0	0.0	SR 52 west	
San Antonio	2.2	3.5	CR 577 (Curley Road) – St. Joseph, Zephyrhills	
St. Leo	4.7	7.6	CR 579 (Prospect Road)	
Dade City			CR 41 north (North 21st Street) to I-75 – St. Joseph, Brooksville	West end of CR 41 overlap; CRs 41/52 turn east onto Meridian Avenue
Dade City			CR 41 south (South 17th Street)	East end of CR 41 overlap
Dade City	9.0	14.5	US 98 / US 301	
1.000 mi = 1.609 km; 1.000 km = 0.621 mi: Concurrency terminus
