= Saint Leo Abbey =

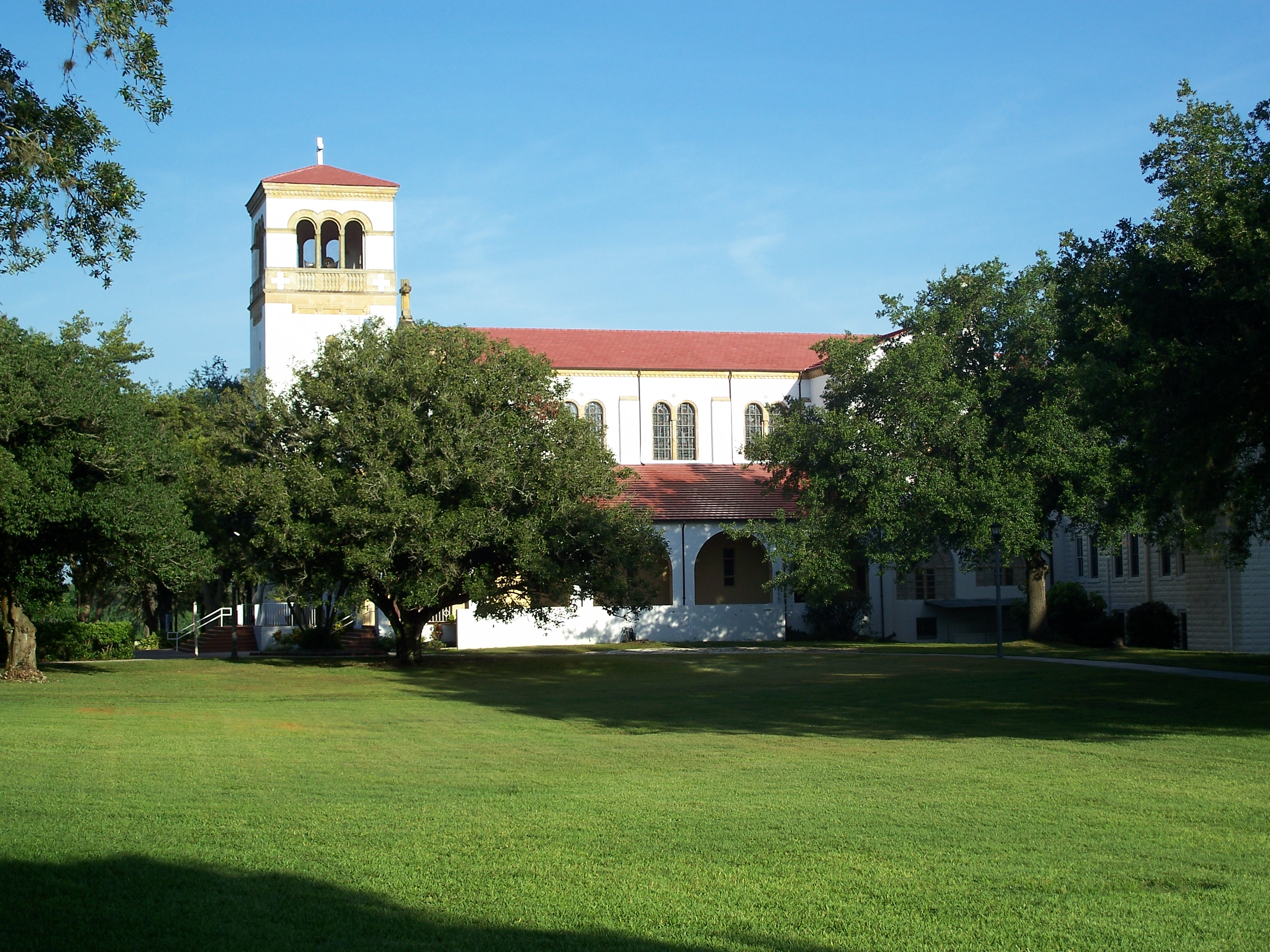

- Location within Florida Location within the United States

Monastery information
- Order: Benedictines
- Established: June 1889
- Mother house: St. Vincent Archabbey
- Diocese: Saint Petersburg
- Controlled churches: Church of the Holy Cross

People
- Abbot: Vacant
- Prior: Br. Apollo Rodriguez, O.S.B.
- Bishop: Most Rev. Gregory Parkes

Architecture
- Status: active
- Heritage designation: National Register of Historic Places
- Designated date: January 7, 1998
- Architect: Frank Parziole
- Style: Italian Romanesque
- Groundbreaking: September 19, 1936

Site
- Location: Pasco County, Florida; St. Leo, Florida
- Coordinates: 28°20′14″N 82°15′36″W
- Website: www.saintleoabbey.org

- Saint Leo Abbey
- U.S. National Register of Historic Places
- U.S. Historic district
- Area: 100 acres (0.40 km^{2})
- NRHP reference No.: 97001637
- Added to NRHP: January 7, 1998

Saint Leo Abbey is an American-Cassinese monastery of Benedictine monks located in Saint Leo, Florida, United States.

== History ==
Saint Leo Abbey, located in Pasco County, Florida, traces its beginnings to 1882 when Judge Edmund F. Dunne founded the Catholic Colony of San Antonio. Sent by Archabbot Boniface Wimmer of Saint Vincent Archabbey in Latrobe, Pennsylvania, Father Gerard Pilz, O.S.B., arrived in 1886 as the first Benedictine in Florida. He was dispatched to Florida in response to a request by Bishop John Moore of St. Augustine for a German-speaking priest to minister to the growing German-immigrant population of the colony.

In 1888, Saint Vincent Archabbey transferred ministry to the colony to Mary Help of Christians Abbey in Belmont, North Carolina. In February 1889, Benedictine nuns arrived from Allegheny, Pennsylvania and founded Holy Name Monastery.

Abbot Leo Haid of Belmont Abbey made the arrangements to establish Saint Leo College, now Saint Leo University. On June 4, 1889, both Saint Leo College and the Benedictine mission that would later become Saint Leo Abbey were founded on lands conveyed to the Order of Saint Benedict by Judge Dunne. Saint Leo became an independent priory in 1894 and was elevated to an abbey on September 25, 1902, by Pope Leo XIII.

In addition to providing priests for the churches of the Catholic Colony, the monks went on to establish Catholic parishes in not only nearby Dade City, but also Zephyrhills, New Port Richey, Brooksville, Crystal River, and Ocala. They even established parishes as far away as Farmingdale, NY and Cuba. In the early part of the 20th century, St. Leo's Benedictines monks could be found in churches and missions throughout the northern half of peninsular Florida. Saint Leo Abbey also sent missionaries to Argentina in the second half of the 20th century. St. Leo continued to supply priests for Catholic congregations throughout Pasco, Hernando and Citrus counties until the last decade of the 20th century.

=== Saint Leo University ===
On June 4, 1889, the Florida Legislature approved the charter that allowed the Catholic religious order to build and operate a school that later became Saint Leo University. The Benedictines transferred title of the University to an independent board in 1969.

=== Church of the Holy Cross ===
Abbot Francis Sadlier commissioned an abbey church to be built in 1935. The Church was designed by Tampa architect Frank Parziole in the Romanesque style. The Church of the Holy Cross was consecrated on January 29, 1948, and was added to the National Register of Historic Places in 1998 as part of the St Leo Abbey Historic District.

=== St. Leo Abbey Historic District ===
On January 7, 1998, the St. Leo Abbey Historic District was added to the U.S. National Register of Historic Places. The district is in St. Leo, Florida on the campus of Saint Leo University, located at 33701 CR 52. It encompasses 100 acres (0.40 km^{2}), and contains three historic buildings.

=== Abbots of Saint Leo ===
The following individuals have served as Abbots of Saint Leo Abbey:

Charles Mohr, O.S.B.	1902 – 1931
Francis Sadlier, O.S.B.	1929 – 1954 (Coadjutor Abbot, 1929 – 1931)
Marion Bowman, O.S.B.	1954 – 1969
Fidelis Dunlap, O.S.B.	1970 – 1985
Patrick Shelton, O.S.B.	1985 – 1996
several administrators	1996 – 2007
Isaac Camacho, O.S.B.	2007 – 2025

== Present day ==
As of 2019, the monks, from all over the U.S., range in age from twenty-three to seventy-four.

== Gallery ==
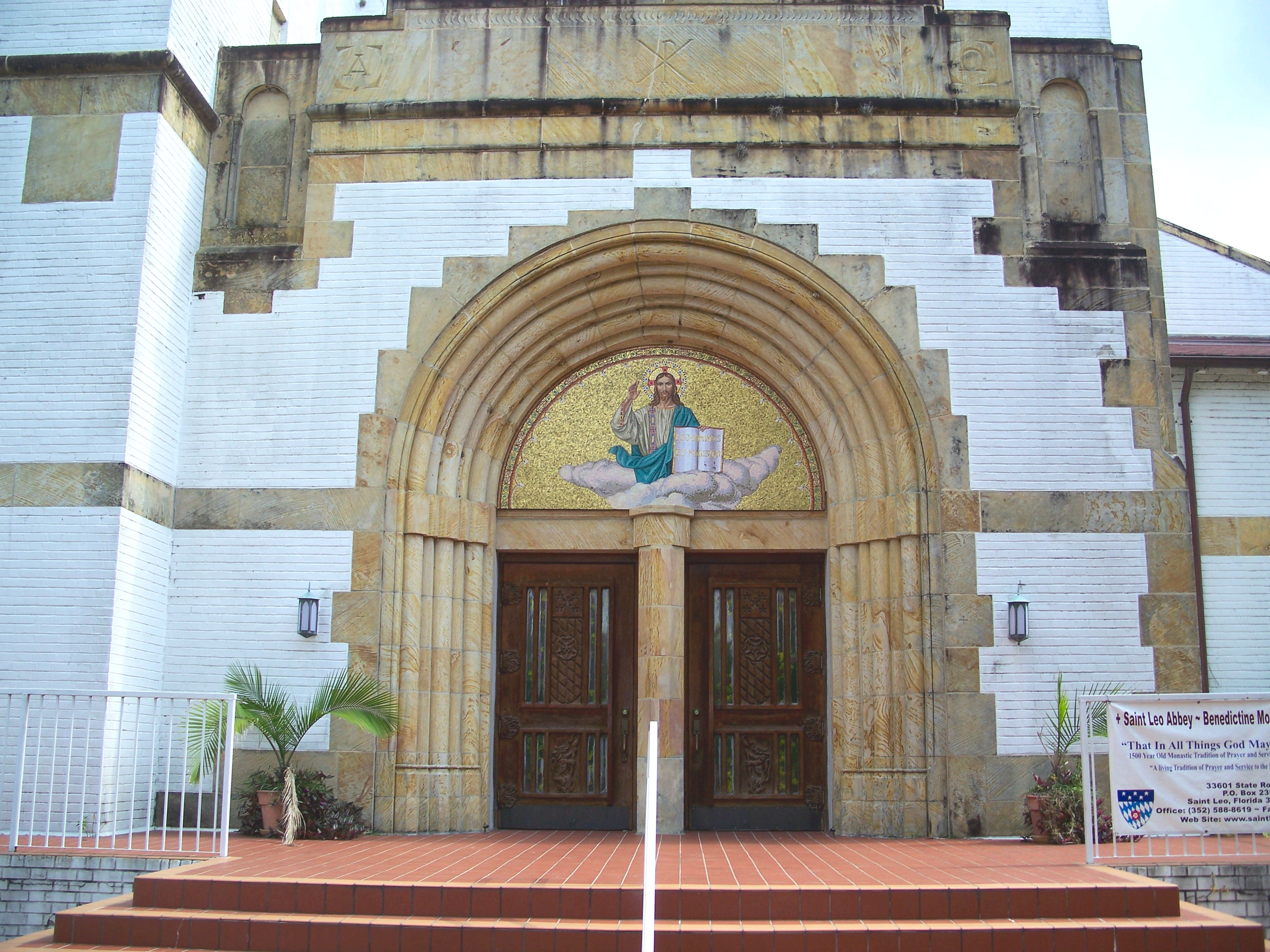
Entrance to St. Leo Abbey Church

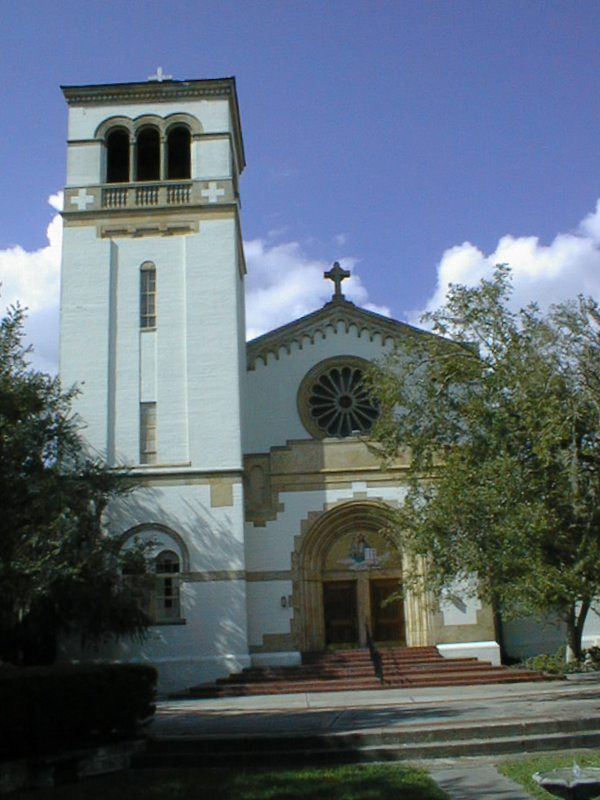
Church of the Holy Cross at Saint Leo Abbey

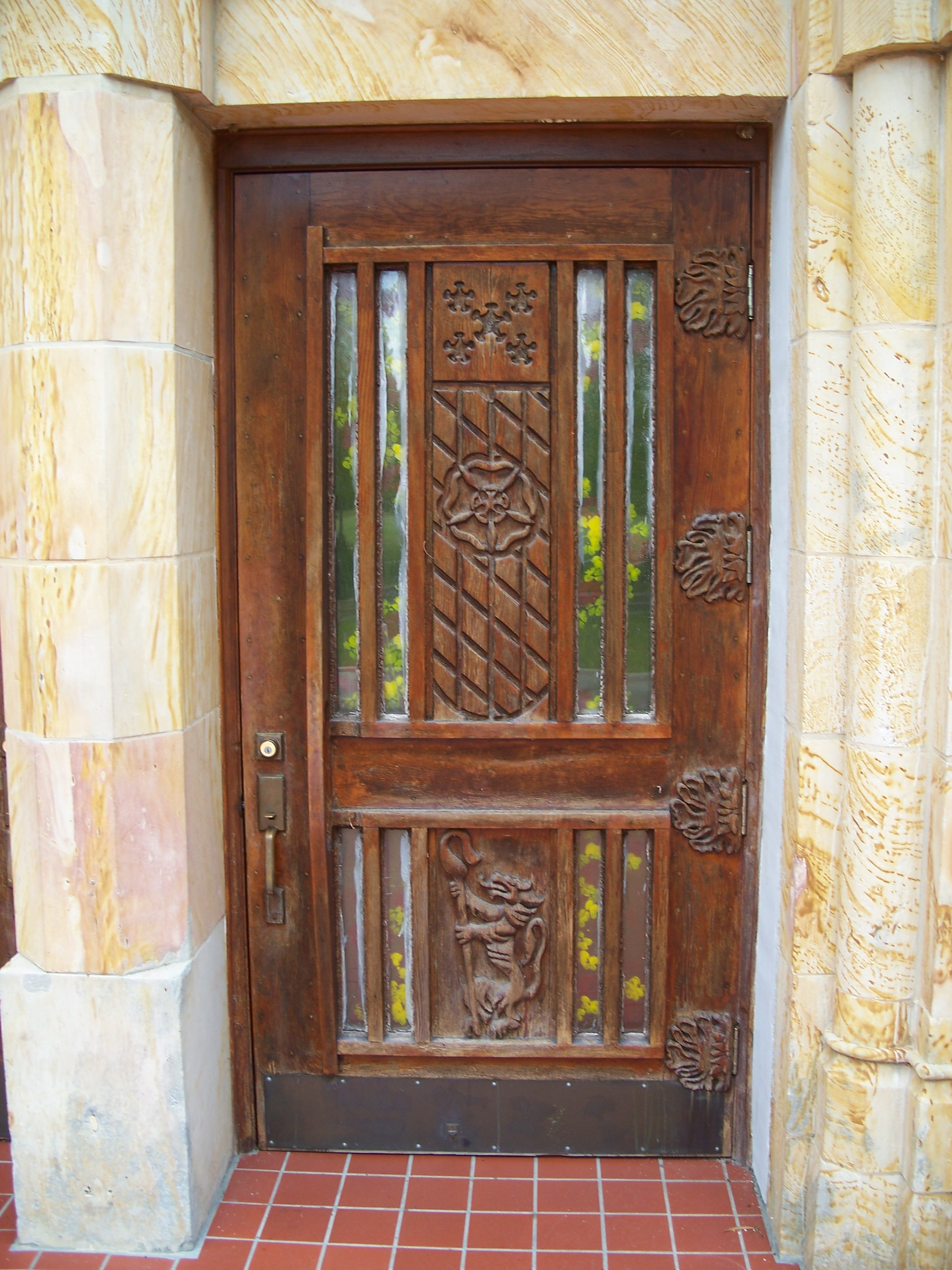
Door to the Monastery

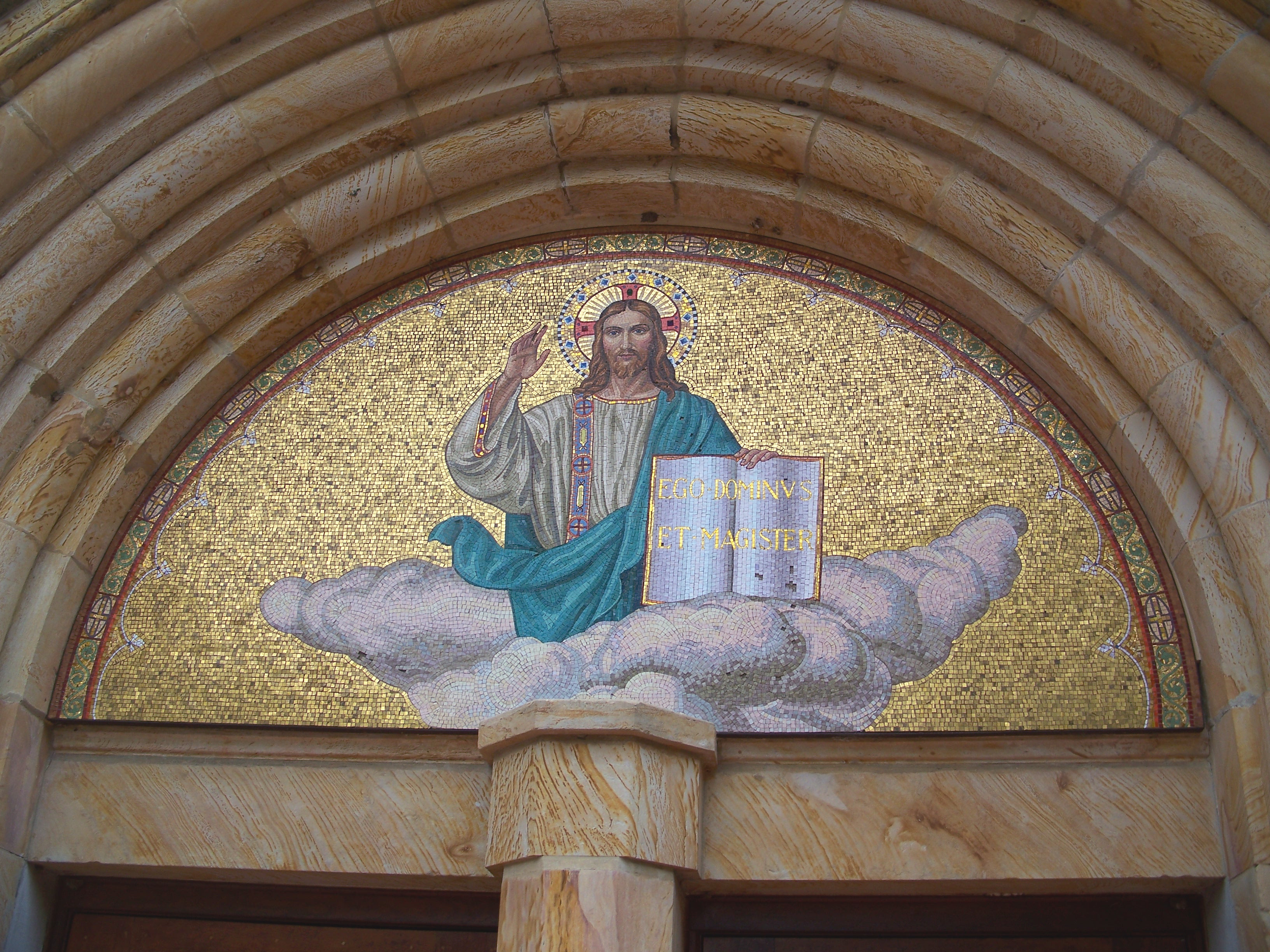
Mosaic over entrance

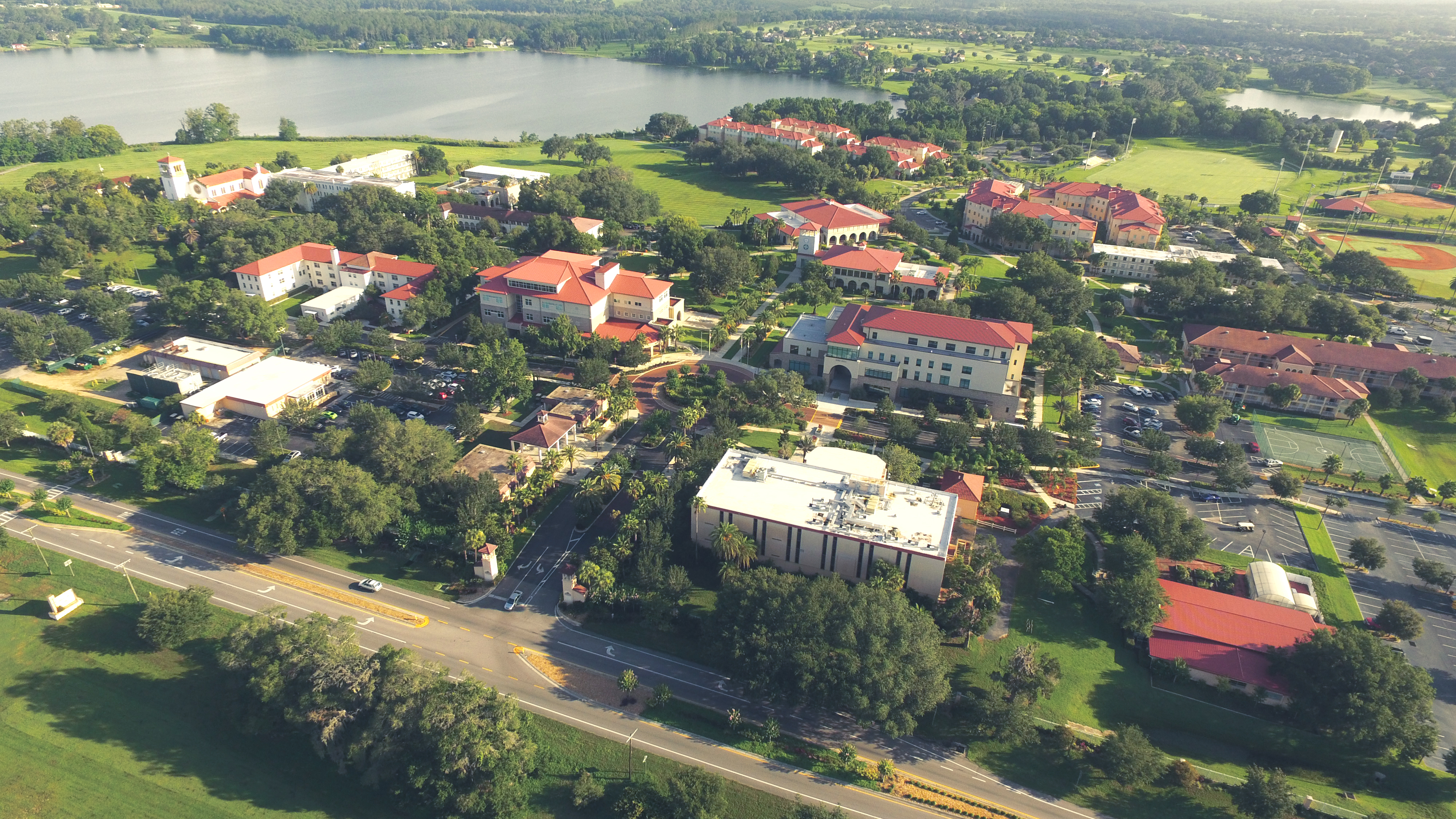
Aerial view of the Abbey and University

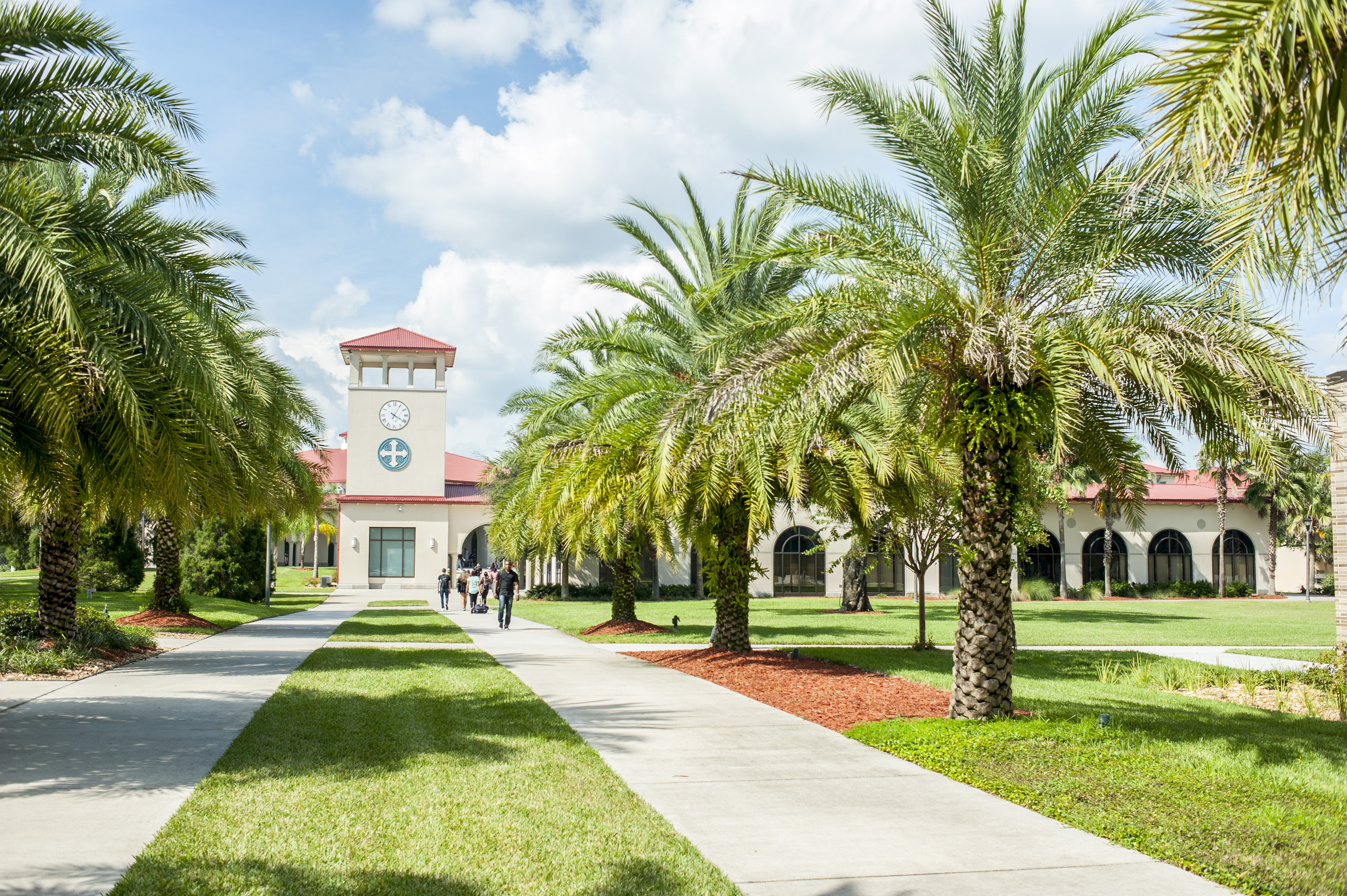
Entrance to Saint Leo University
