= St. Leo, Florida =

- Town
- Town of St. Leo
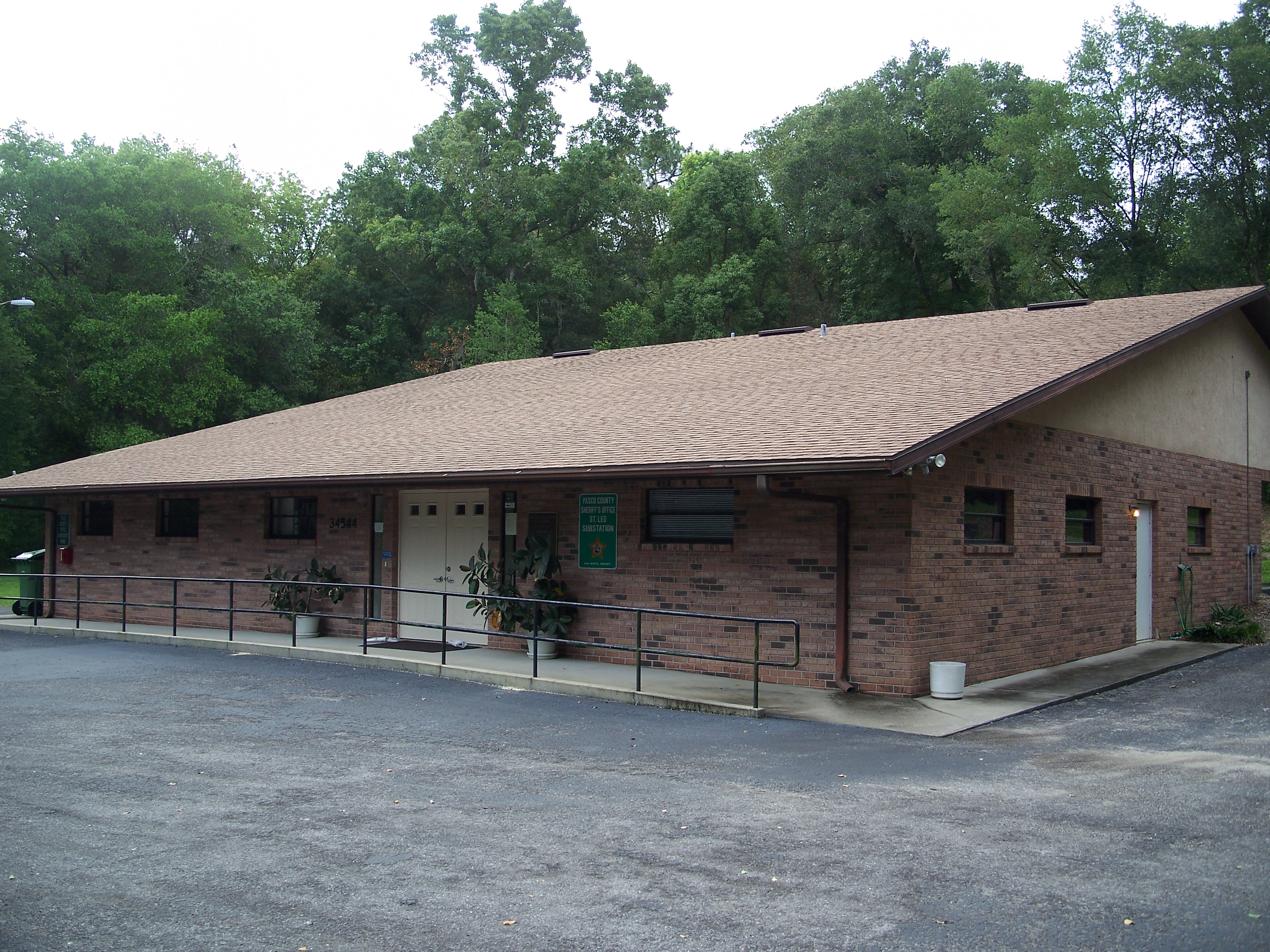
- St. Leo Town Hall

- Seal

- Location in Pasco County and the state of Florida
- Coordinates: 28°20′08″N 82°15′06″W
- Country: United States
- State: Florida
- County: Pasco
- Settled: 1881
- Incorporated: June 4, 1891

Government
  - Type: Mayor–Commission
  - Mayor: Richard Christmas
  - Mayor Pro Tem: William E. Hamilton
  - Commissioners: Curtis Dwyer, Gregory Smith, Apollo Rodriguez
  - Town Clerk and Town Administrator: Andrea B. Calvert
  - City Attorney: Marisa Powers

Area
  - Total: 1.30 sq mi (3.37 km^{2})
  - Land: 1.12 sq mi (2.91 km^{2})
  - Water: 0.18 sq mi (0.46 km^{2})
- Elevation: 187 ft (57 m)

Population (2020)
  - Total: 2,362
  - Density: 2,102.9/sq mi (811.92/km^{2})
- Time zone: UTC-5 (Eastern (EST))
  - Summer (DST): UTC-4 (EDT)
- ZIP code: 33574
- Area code: 352
- FIPS code: 12-62775
- GNIS feature ID: 2407271
- Website: www.townofstleo.org

St. Leo or Saint Leo is a town in Pasco County, Florida, United States. The town is a suburb included in the Tampa-St. Petersburg-Clearwater, Florida Metropolitan Statistical Area, which is more commonly known as the Tampa Bay area. It is best known as the home of Saint Leo University, Holy Name Monastery and Saint Leo Abbey. The population was 2,362 at the 2020 census.

== History ==
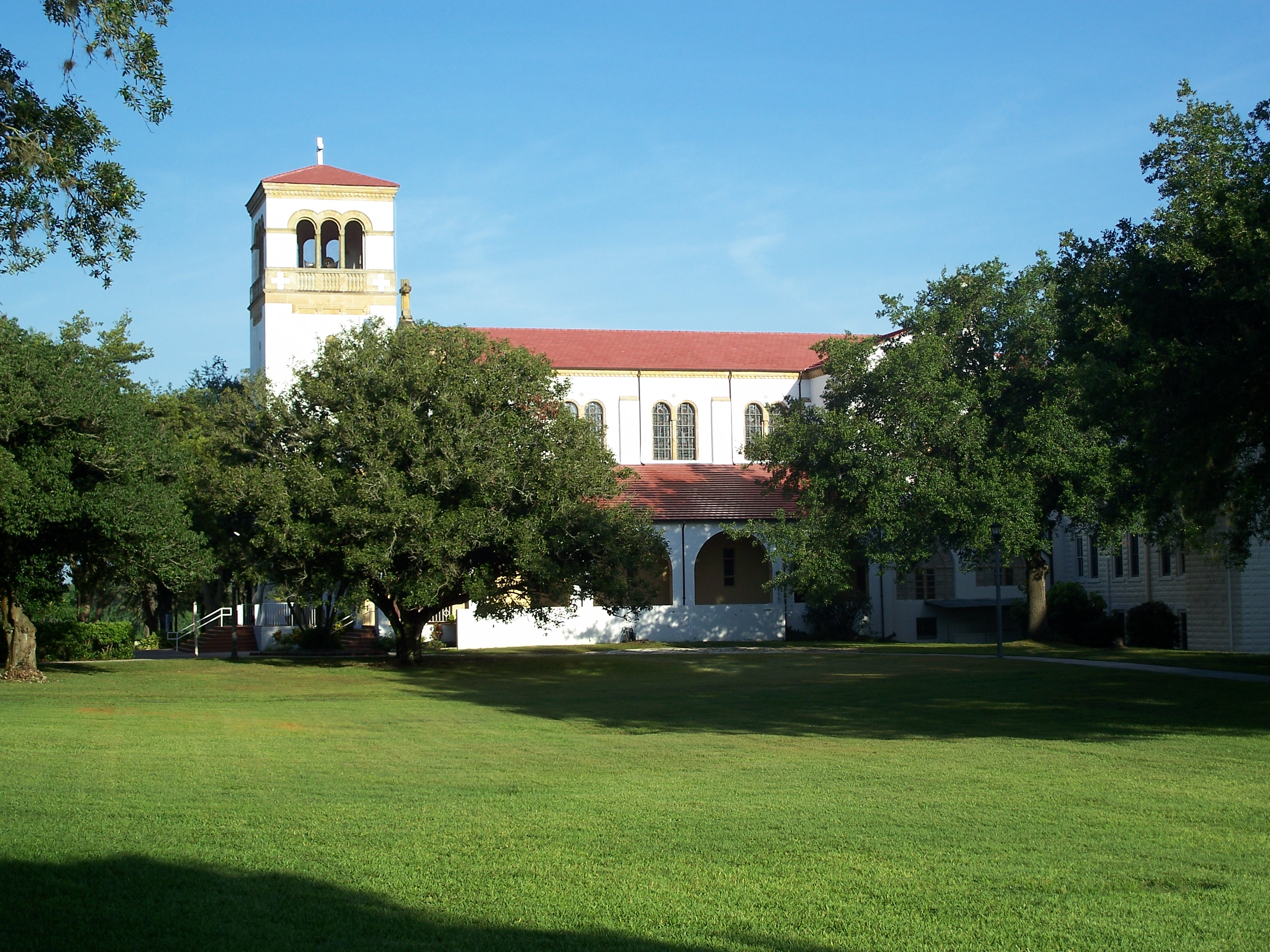
Saint Leo Abbey

In 1889, the Benedictines established the Holy Name Monastery, Saint Leo Abbey, and St. Leo College on Judge Edmund F. Dunne's former homestead and farmland east of San Antonio, Florida on the shores of Lake Jovita, later incorporating the area as part of a new town called St. Leo.

Dunne was a legal counsel involved in the Disston Land Purchase of 1881, and as his commission, received 100,000 choice acres (400 km2) of land out of the 4,000,000 acre (16,000 km^{2}) purchase. The following year on February 15, while surveying the Disston Purchase with his cousin, Captain Hugh Dunne, Dunne selected the area around Lake Jovita, which he named after St. Jovita, as his commission and began settling it.

He first established the Catholic colony of San Antonio in 1882, and later added the surrounding villages of Saint Joseph, Saint Thomas, Villa Maria, Carmel, and San Felipe. Only the rural community of Saint Joseph survives today.

The area of what is now St. Leo, although originally platted as another village by Dunne, did not receive its name until after the arrival of the Benedictine monks. The present name is derived from Pope Leo IX.

The Town of St. Leo was officially incorporated as a municipality on June 4, 1891.

== Geography ==
According to the United States Census Bureau, the town has a total area of 1.9 square miles (4.9 km^{2}), of which 1.6 square miles (4.1 km^{2}) is land and 0.3 square miles (0.78 km^{2}) (13.90%) is water.

St. Leo contains rolling hills with elevations from 100 ft to 187 ft.

=== Climate ===
The climate in this area is characterized by hot, humid summers and generally mild winters. According to the Köppen climate classification, the Town of St. Leo has a humid subtropical climate zone (Cfa).

Climate data for St. Leo, Florida, 1991–2020 normals, extremes 1895–present
Month	Jan	Feb	Mar	Apr	May	Jun	Jul	Aug	Sep	Oct	Nov	Dec	Year
Record high °F (°C)	89 (32)	92 (33)	95 (35)	98 (37)	101 (38)	104 (40)	102 (39)	101 (38)	101 (38)	98 (37)	96 (36)	89 (32)	104 (40)
Mean maximum °F (°C)	82.6 (28.1)	84.2 (29.0)	86.9 (30.5)	90.4 (32.4)	94.5 (34.7)	95.3 (35.2)	95.3 (35.2)	95.1 (35.1)	93.8 (34.3)	91.1 (32.8)	86.9 (30.5)	83.3 (28.5)	96.8 (36.0)
Mean daily maximum °F (°C)	70.0 (21.1)	73.2 (22.9)	77.5 (25.3)	82.6 (28.1)	87.7 (30.9)	89.4 (31.9)	90.1 (32.3)	90.0 (32.2)	88.4 (31.3)	83.4 (28.6)	76.6 (24.8)	72.0 (22.2)	81.7 (27.6)
Daily mean °F (°C)	59.7 (15.4)	62.6 (17.0)	66.4 (19.1)	71.4 (21.9)	76.7 (24.8)	80.2 (26.8)	81.3 (27.4)	81.4 (27.4)	79.8 (26.6)	74.1 (23.4)	66.8 (19.3)	62.1 (16.7)	71.9 (22.2)
Mean daily minimum °F (°C)	49.4 (9.7)	52.0 (11.1)	55.3 (12.9)	60.3 (15.7)	65.7 (18.7)	71.0 (21.7)	72.6 (22.6)	72.8 (22.7)	71.1 (21.7)	64.9 (18.3)	57.0 (13.9)	52.2 (11.2)	62.0 (16.7)
Mean minimum °F (°C)	27.0 (−2.8)	29.3 (−1.5)	33.0 (0.6)	42.0 (5.6)	51.8 (11.0)	64.4 (18.0)	67.8 (19.9)	68.9 (20.5)	62.4 (16.9)	45.6 (7.6)	34.5 (1.4)	30.5 (−0.8)	24.2 (−4.3)
Record low °F (°C)	13 (−11)	16 (−9)	20 (−7)	30 (−1)	41 (5)	55 (13)	60 (16)	62 (17)	51 (11)	29 (−2)	22 (−6)	15 (−9)	13 (−11)
Average precipitation inches (mm)	3.06 (78)	2.38 (60)	3.18 (81)	3.06 (78)	2.98 (76)	8.34 (212)	8.10 (206)	8.28 (210)	6.63 (168)	3.06 (78)	1.86 (47)	2.53 (64)	53.46 (1,358)
Average precipitation days (≥ 0.01 in)	7.8	7.4	6.8	6.3	7.0	14.8	17.2	17.8	13.0	7.6	5.8	7.0	118.5
Source: NOAA

== Demographics ==
Historical population
Census	Pop.	Note	%±
1930	158		—
1940	211		33.5%
1950	261		23.7%
1960	278		6.5%
1970	1,145		311.9%
1980	917		−19.9%
1990	1,009		10.0%
2000	595		−41.0%
2010	1,340		125.2%
2020	2,362		76.3%
U.S. Decennial Census

=== Racial and ethnic composition ===
St. Leo racial composition (Hispanics excluded from racial categories) (NH = Non-Hispanic)
Race	Pop 2010	Pop 2020	% 2010	% 2020
White (NH)	919	910	68.58%	38.53%
Black or African American (NH)	188	938	14.03%	39.71%
Native American or Alaska Native (NH)	2	2	0.15%	0.08%
Asian (NH)	24	70	1.79%	2.96%
Pacific Islander or Native Hawaiian (NH)	0	0	0.00%	0.00%
Some other race (NH)	4	13	0.30%	0.55%
Two or more races/Multiracial (NH)	39	31	2.91%	1.31%
Hispanic or Latino (any race)	164	398	12.24%	16.85%
Total	1,340	2,362		

=== 2020 census ===
As of the 2020 census, St. Leo had a population of 2,362. The median age was 20.3 years. 4.1% of residents were under the age of 18 and 1.3% of residents were 65 years of age or older. For every 100 females there were 74.3 males, and for every 100 females age 18 and over there were 68.6 males age 18 and over.

In 2020, 95.7% of residents lived in urban areas, while 4.3% lived in rural areas.

In 2020, there were 48 households in St. Leo, of which 37.5% had children under the age of 18 living in them. Of all households, 56.3% were married-couple households, 14.6% were households with a male householder and no spouse or partner present, and 22.9% were households with a female householder and no spouse or partner present. About 10.5% of all households were made up of individuals and 2.1% had someone living alone who was 65 years of age or older.

In 2020, there were 48 housing units, of which 0.0% were vacant. The homeowner vacancy rate was 0.0% and the rental vacancy rate was 0.0%.

=== 2010 census ===
As of the 2010 United States census, there were 1,340 people, 106 households, and 75 families residing in the town.

=== 2000 census ===
As of the census of 2000, there were 595 people, 41 households, and 30 families residing in the town. The population density was 369.8 inhabitants per square mile (142.8/km^{2}). There were 44 housing units at an average density of 27.3 per square mile (10.5/km^{2}). The racial makeup of the town was 85.38% White, 8.57% African American, 1.85% Asian, 0.17% Pacific Islander, 0.67% from other races, and 3.36% from two or more races. Hispanic or Latino of any race were 8.91% of the population.

In 2000, there were 41 households, out of which 43.9% had children under the age of 18 living with them, 56.1% were married couples living together, 12.2% had a female householder with no husband present, and 24.4% were non-families. 22.0% of all households were made up of individuals, and 9.8% had someone living alone who was 65 years of age or older. The average household size was 2.63 and the average family size was 3.10.

In 2000, in the town, the population was spread out, with 5.5% under the age of 18, 77.0% from 18 to 24, 6.4% from 25 to 44, 6.2% from 45 to 64, and 4.9% who were 65 years of age or older. The median age was 20 years. For every 100 females, there were 91.9 males. For every 100 females age 18 and over, there were 91.8 males.

In 2000, the median income for a household in the town was $37,917, and the median income for a family was $39,583. Males had a median income of $35,000 versus $7,250 for females. The per capita income for the town was $8,384. About 11.4% of families and 19.9% of the population were below the poverty line, including 18.8% of those under age 18 and 26.3% of those age 65 or over.
