= Eugene O'Dunne =

American lawyer

Eugene O'Dunne or Eugene Antonio Dunne (June 22, 1875 – October 30, 1959) was a judge of the Supreme Bench of Baltimore City.

== Personal life ==
Born in Tucson, O'Dunne was the son of Judge Edmund F. Dunne, who was Chief Justice of the Arizona Territory at the time. His mother Josephine Cecelia Warner, though originally from Mississippi herself, was part of an old Virginia family. In 1894 he graduated from St. Mary's College (now Belmont Abbey) in North Carolina. Two years later he would receive an M.A. from St. Mary's as well. It was during this time that Eugene legally changed his last name to the ancestral family name of O'Dunne, while at the same time dropping his middle name of Antonio. This was done as to further emphasize his Irish heritage. He practiced law with his father in Jacksonville, Florida at the firm of Dunne and O'Dunne. He later went on to receive a law degree in 1900 from the University of Maryland.

In 1904, Judge O’Dunne was married to the great-grandniece of John Quincy Adams. He and his spouse owned a home in Baltimore and a summer residence in Blue Ridge Summit, located in Pennsylvania. The couple had six children together: Mrs. E. Gettings Merryman, Eugene O'Dunne Jr., Mrs. John P Winand, Samillon O'Dunne, Hamilton O’Dunne and David O'Dunne. Eugene's wife suffered from paralysis and died on August 30, 1935. Years after her death, O'Dunne would later remarry to Mrs. Helen Keep in 1950. Eugene O'Dunne is also the older brother of noted Santa Fe society columnist and author Brian Boru Dunne, who wrote for The Santa Fe New Mexican for most of the first half of the 20th century.

He died in 1959 in Ogunquit, Maine.

== Beliefs ==
O'Dunne was raised as a Roman Catholic. Despite the racism existing in Maryland, Judge O’Dunne ruled against segregation. He sought justice and enforced the law equally for Caucasians and African Americans. Pearson vs. Murray provided an example of this because he ruled against school segregation. O'Dunne favored neither the rich nor the poor, and applied the law equally among all individuals.

== Career ==
Throughout his judicial career, the community had favored O'Dunne for his respectful point of view regarding the rights of each person. After serving many years on the supreme bench of Baltimore, he retired from the bench in Baltimore at the mandatory age of 70. Although retired, O’Dunne was said to have remained active in legal affairs.

O’Dunne's career as a judge on the Supreme Bench of Baltimore was filled with many ups and downs. There were times in his career that he felt as though he was being ‘muzzled’, and was never permitted to fully express his opinions. During his time spent as a judge on the Supreme Bench of Baltimore he was considered a fearless and fair leader in the judicial system. He was both respected and feared by the citizens of Baltimore and the members of the legal community alike. During his forty-five years as a judge he helped clean up many aspects of the legal system including, but not limited to; fixing the penal establishment, abolishing the ancient Black Hand of the Justices of the Peace, reorganizing the state's legal business, and attacking on the old fee system. His most well-known court decision was made in the case of The University of Maryland v. Donald G. Murray, where he ruled in the favor of Donald G. Murray and started the movement that ended the discrimination against African-Americans applying to law schools in Maryland. He also was responsible for the desegregation of golf courses in the city of Baltimore; as long as the member dues were paid color was not to be a factor of who was allowed. He was known for his harsh sentences on minor criminal offences, such as robbery, but was not as harsh on those individuals that back talked and police, later being accused of disturbing the peace. He constantly fought corrupt members of the police department, lazy judges, and the press just to name a few. O'Dunne's main goal was to keep the streets safe and free of any criminal behavior regardless of its degree of offence, but would become highly irritated with those police officers that tried to wrongfully accuse a man of a crime. After his retirement in 1945 at the age of seventy, he still continued to actively follow the legal issues of the city. One noted incident he took great interest in was the escape of Maryland State Penitentiary inmate, Joseph Holmes. When he received word that Holmes had escaped most would have expected him to believe along the lines that, "justice must prevail", since he had spent many years as a Supreme Bench justice with that mentality. Instead he shocked the public with a quote from Shakespeare's Othello, "I do perceive here a divided duty…" and continued to look at the prisoners escape as not a bad, but a good thing. Eugene O'Dunne spent twenty years of his life as a judge for the city of Baltimore in hopes of ridding the city of crime. During that time he made many friends and just as many enemies, but those who were a part of the legal system during O’Dunne's years as a judge for the city of the Baltimore would all agree he was most certainly the most memorable judge of his time.

He also taught criminal law and medical jurisprudence at the University of Maryland, Johns Hopkins and the University of Baltimore. In retirement O'Dunne practiced law with one of his sons and worked as a public relations counsel for the local liquor industry.
