= Faustinus of Brescia =

Saint Faustinus of Brescia

Bishop of Brescia
- Born: 4th century
- Died: 15 February 381
- Feast: 15 February; 16 February: Orthodox Church

Faustinus (died about 15 February 381 A.D.) was bishop of Brescia from c. 360, succeeding Ursicinus. His feast day in the Roman Catholic Church is 15 February: 16 February in the Orthodox Church.

Tradition claims that he was a descendant of Faustinus and Jovita, and that he compiled the Acts of these two martyrs. His relics were discovered in 1101.

Faustinus appeared in the old Roman Martyrology for February 15: "At Brescia, [in the year 350], the holy Confessor Faustinus, Bishop of that see." He is no longer listed in the 2004 revision. This may be because of some doubt that the person existed, or because their cult was never approved.
