= Chris Arnade =

American photographer

Chris Arnade (/ɑːrˈnɑːdi/; born c. 1965) is an American photographer and writer. He worked for 20 years as a bond trader on Wall Street; in 2011, he started documenting the lives of poor people and their drug addictions and commenting on the state of the society of the United States. He did this through photographs posted on social media and articles in various media, most often The Guardian. He does not call himself a journalist; some journalists object to his work and some sources refer to him as a journalist.

Arnade developed what he calls the McDonald's test, saying that a person's attitude towards the fast-food restaurant McDonald's indicates whether the person lives a life of relative privilege.

== Early life ==
Arnade was born around 1965 and was brought up in San Antonio, Florida, a conservative, Roman Catholic community. His father was of Jewish heritage, had escaped Nazi Germany and had become a professor in the US. His mother was a homemaker who raised a family of seven children (Chris has five brothers and one sister) and then became an academic librarian.

Arnade went to college and then to Johns Hopkins University, where he earned a PhD in particle physics.

== Career ==
Arnade started working on Wall Street in 1993 as a quantitative analyst. A former colleague told The Wall Street Journal that he frequently argued politics with other traders, most of whom were in the "libertarian wing of the Republican Party"; Arnade eventually tired of "hearing [traders] who had lost millions and gotten bailed out complaining that Obamacare raised their taxes." Arnade called his work on Wall Street "intellectual grift".

Arnade worked on Wall Street for 20 years, with the last position being on the foreign trading desk at Citigroup. During the 2008 financial crisis, he became more disillusioned with his industry and began riding the subway to its last stop then walking home, which often led him through the Bronx, where he talked to people and began taking their photos. He also did volunteer work in the Bronx, with the Hunts Point Alliance for Children, which led him into engagement with people who lived there. In 2012, his mother died. The same year, Citi shut down the trading desk he was working on, due to new regulations. He accepted a buyout from Citi in 2012 and retired. Then he began to spend all his time exploring the lives of poor and working-class people. To deal with the reduced income, his family moved from Brooklyn to upstate New York.

=== Photography ===
By 2013, Arnade had published a series of photographs of sex workers and addicts in the Bronx on Flickr called Faces of Addiction. The work was criticized by photojournalists, whose industry ethics forbid paying subjects in any form, as well as rejecting staged photos and intentionally blurred backgrounds. It also received criticism by some advocates for poor people, as well as by Michael Kamber, a former journalist for The New York Times and the director of the Bronx Documentary Center, who said that Arnade manipulated his subjects, and that his pictures reinforced negative stereotypes of the Bronx and humiliated the subjects. Arnade in turn criticized what photojournalists do and asked "What right do you have to make someone’s suffering pretty?"

In 2014, Arnade started to take trips driving across the country, visiting small towns, many in the Rust Belt as well as cities, and photographed people and talked with them in the street or in places, such as fast-food restaurants, where they spent time. He also started getting his stories and pictures published in The Guardian and The Atlantic, which brought in some income. He mostly published on social media such as Twitter and Flickr.

Arnade came to a perspective that there is a division by social class in the United States between what he calls the "front-row kids" and the "back-row kids", with knowledge workers, including many people in the US media, in the "front row" and most of the poor and working-class people in the "back row". He explained the victory of Donald Trump as being due to Trump's articulation of the unmet needs, unheard voices and hopelessness of the "back-row kids" and Democrats' failures to hear or address the needs of most Americans due to the Democratic leadership being "front-row kids" themselves. When Trump accepted the nomination as the Republican candidate for the 2016 US presidential election, Arnade was in Ohio, but not at the convention; he was in a strip club in Parma, a working-class suburb of Cleveland, watching people celebrate.

== Personal life ==
Arnade identifies politically as a socialist. He was an atheist during his Wall Street days, but says "it's more complicated now".

== Works published ==
- Arnade, Chris (2019). Dignity: Seeking Respect in Back Row America. New York: Sentinel. ISBN 978-0-525-53473-0.
