= San Antonio, Florida =

- City
- City of San Antonio
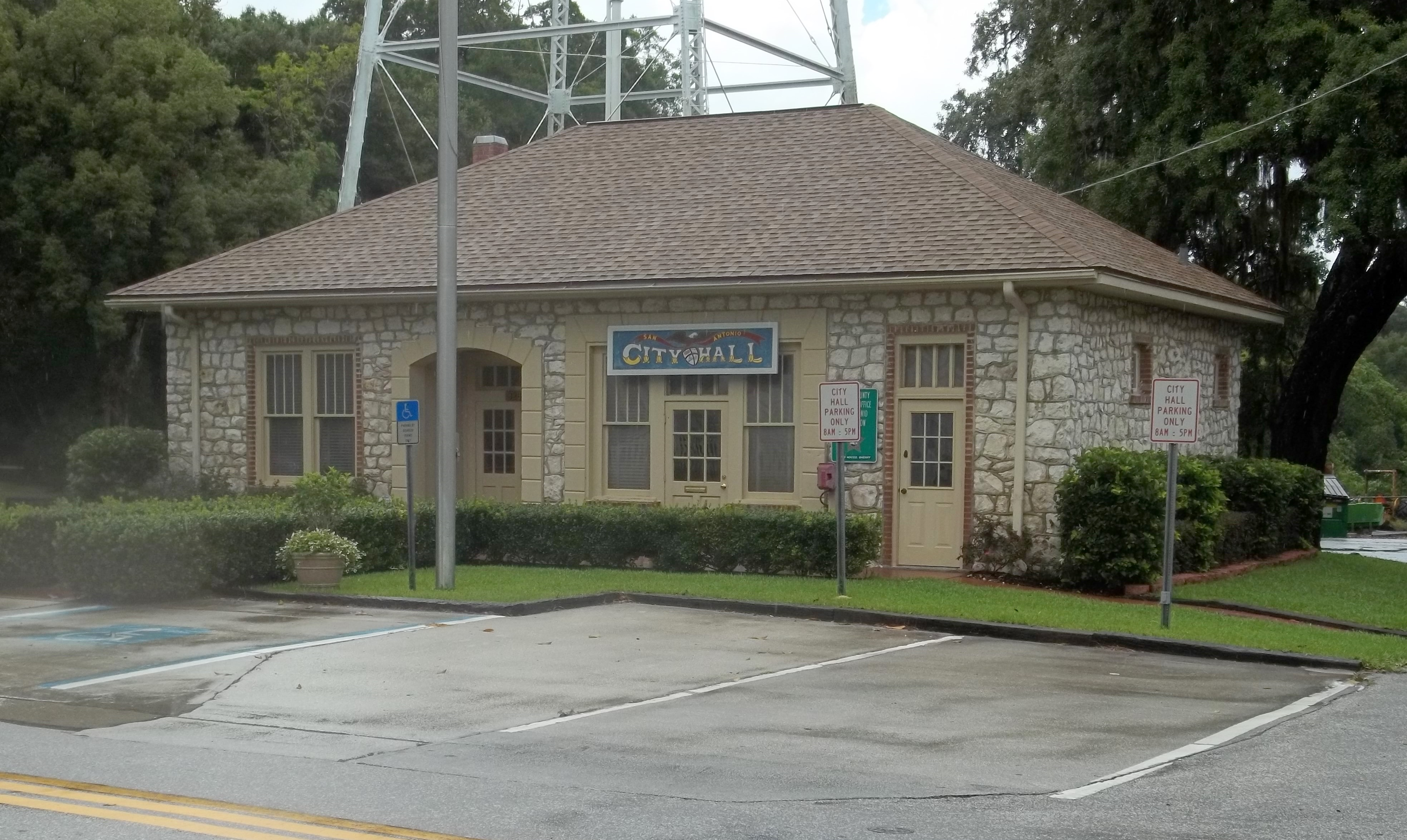
- San Antonio City Hall (built 1939)

- Seal
- Nicknames: San Ann, San An'
- Motto: "Gem of the Highlands"
- Location in Pasco County and the state of Florida
- Coordinates: 28°20′23″N 82°16′43″W
- Country: United States
- State: Florida
- County: Pasco
- Settled (San Antonio de Padua): February 15, 1882
- Incorporated (Town of San Antonio): August 7, 1891
- Incorporated (City of Lake Jovita): June 2, 1926
- Incorporated (City of San Antonio): May 23, 1931

Government
  - Type: Mayor-Commission
  - Mayor: John T. Vogel II
  - Mayor Pro Tem: Caitlin Bolender
  - Commissioners: Blaze Drinkwine, Randy Huckabee, and Sasha Madden
  - City Clerk: Marissa N. Morales
  - City Attorney: Gerald T. Buhr

Area
  - Total: 1.36 sq mi (3.52 km^{2})
  - Land: 1.36 sq mi (3.52 km^{2})
  - Water: 0 sq mi (0.00 km^{2})
- Elevation: 157 ft (48 m)

Population (2020)
  - Total: 1,297
  - Density: 954.3/sq mi (368.44/km^{2})
- Time zone: UTC-5 (Eastern (EST))
  - Summer (DST): UTC-4 (EDT)
- ZIP code: 33576
- Area code: 352
- FIPS code: 12-63375
- GNIS feature ID: 2405413
- Website: sanantonioflorida.org

San Antonio, or unofficially "San Ann" or "San An" as the locals call it, is a city in Pasco County, Florida, United States. It is a suburban city included in the Tampa-St. Petersburg-Clearwater, Florida Metropolitan Statistical Area, much more commonly known as the Tampa Bay Area. It lies within Florida's 12th congressional district. The population was 1,297 at the 2020 census.

It was established as a Catholic colony by Judge Edmund F. Dunne. The city derives its name from Saint Anthony of Padua. Saint Leo University is located nearby.

== History ==
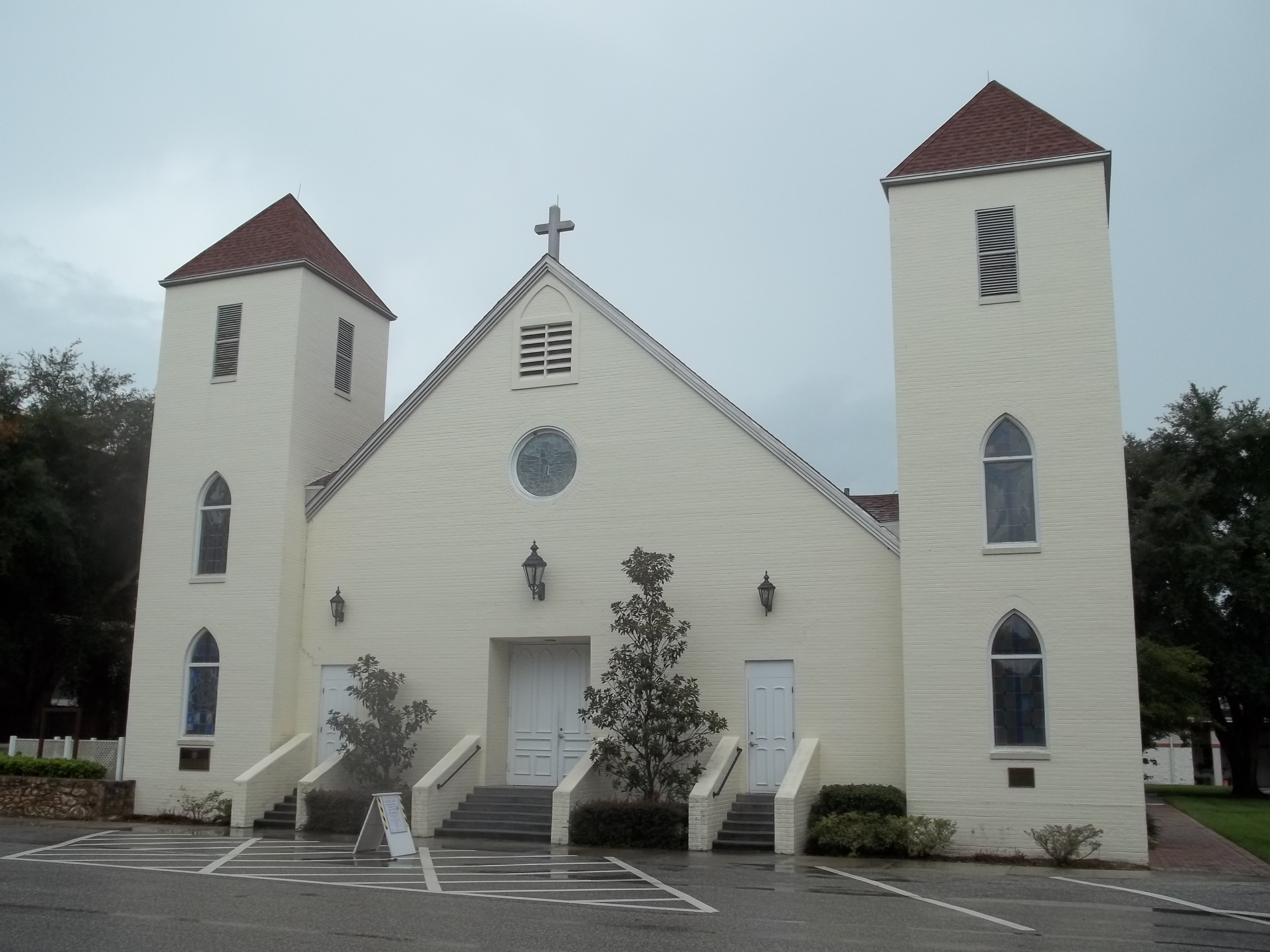
St. Anthony of Padua Catholic Church, est. 1883

San Antonio was founded by Edmund F. Dunne, an Irish American who had previously served as chief justice of the Arizona Territory. In June 1881, Dunne was a legal counsel involved in the Disston Land Purchase, and as his commission, received 100,000 choice acres (400 km2) of land out of the 4,000,000-acre (16,000 km^{2}) purchase. The following year on February 15, 1882, while surveying the Disston Land Purchase with his cousin, Captain Hugh Dunne, he came upon a previously unsurveyed lake with crystal-clear water. Seeing in a prayer book that it was the feast day of St. Jovita, he named the lake, Lake Jovita, after the early Christian martyr, and named the community, "San Antonio de Padua", after Saint Anthony of Padua.

Judge Dunne selected the city's location on Lake Jovita's western shore and began settling it in earnest. He intended for the city to be the center of a Roman Catholic colony in Florida, then a heavily Protestant state. Dunne planned several other villages for the surrounding area including St. Thomas, Villa Maria, Carmel, and San Felipe, but only the rural community of St. Joseph survives today.

In San Antonio's early years, Dunne only permitted practicing Roman Catholics to settle in the colony. The earliest settlers were mostly of Irish descent, but San Antonio's numbers were soon bolstered by German immigrants, who came to form about half the city's population by the mid-1880s. There was also a French community and, in later years, a minority of Florida cracker Protestants. As late as the 1900s, African Americans were not permitted to settle in San Antonio; in 1902, a Black American man was lynched in San Antonio for the alleged rape of a white woman.

The "Town of San Antonio" was officially incorporated as a municipality on August 7, 1891.

In June 1889, the Benedictines established the monastery of St. Leo and St. Leo College on Dunne's former homestead and farm land, later incorporating the area as part of a separate town, St. Leo, Florida. Earlier that year five Benedictine sisters established Holy Name Convent in the center of San Antonio. The nuns had come to teach at two local schools (St. Anthony School and St. Joseph School), as well as to establish Holy Name Academy. The sisters had the convent and the academy physically moved by oxen to a 40-acre parcel in St. Leo overlooking the southwestern shore of Lake Jovita in 1911. The nuns remained at St. Anthony School until the end of the 2009–2010 academic year.

At the time of its founding San Antonio was located in the southern third of Hernando County, as Pasco County was not created until June 1887. The Orange Belt Railway first began service to San Antonio in November 1887.

On June 2, 1926, the city officially changed its name to the "City of Lake Jovita" in an attempt to capitalize on the Florida Land Boom. The city also changed many of its street names, replacing explicitly Catholic names with secular ones. On May 23, 1931, the city changed its name back to the "City of San Antonio"; but the secularized street names remained.

== Geography ==
According to the United States Census Bureau, the village has a total area of 1.2 square miles (3.1 km^{2}), all land.

San Antonio has a rolling topography with elevations varying from a low of 110 feet on the western edge of the city to as high as 183 feet on a hill overlooking Lake Jovita on the eastern edge of town.

=== Climate ===
The climate in this area is characterized by hot, humid summers and generally mild winters. According to the Köppen climate classification, the City of San Antonio has a humid subtropical climate zone (Cfa).

== Demographics ==
Historical population
Census	Pop.	Note	%±
1910	131		—
1920	262		100.0%
1930	322		22.9%
1940	267		−17.1%
1950	286		7.1%
1960	479		67.5%
1970	473		−1.3%
1980	529		11.8%
1990	776		46.7%
2000	655		−15.6%
2010	1,138		73.7%
2020	1,297		14.0%
U.S. Decennial Census

=== Racial and ethnic composition ===
San Antonio racial composition (Hispanics excluded from racial categories) (NH = Non-Hispanic)
Race	Pop 2010	Pop 2020	% 2010	% 2020
White (NH)	1,043	994	91.65%	76.64%
Black or African American (NH)	12	32	1.05%	2.47%
Native American or Alaska Native (NH)	0	11	0.00%	0.85%
Asian (NH)	4	17	0.35%	1.31%
Pacific Islander or Native Hawaiian (NH)	0	0	0.00%	0.00%
Some other race (NH)	3	3	0.26%	0.23%
Two or more races/Multiracial (NH)	7	54	0.62%	4.16%
Hispanic or Latino (any race)	69	186	6.06%	14.34%
Total	1,138	1,297		

=== 2020 census ===
As of the 2020 census, San Antonio had a population of 1,297. The median age was 41.3 years. 21.0% of residents were under the age of 18 and 18.2% of residents were 65 years of age or older. For every 100 females there were 92.1 males, and for every 100 females age 18 and over there were 91.0 males age 18 and over.

0.0% of residents lived in urban areas, while 100.0% lived in rural areas.

There were 518 households in San Antonio, of which 37.5% had children under the age of 18 living in them. Of all households, 57.9% were married-couple households, 13.9% were households with a male householder and no spouse or partner present, and 22.4% were households with a female householder and no spouse or partner present. About 20.3% of all households were made up of individuals and 9.7% had someone living alone who was 65 years of age or older.

There were 551 housing units, of which 6.0% were vacant. The homeowner vacancy rate was 1.2% and the rental vacancy rate was 8.3%.

The 2020 American Community Survey 5-year estimates reported 342 families residing in the city.

=== 2010 census ===
As of the 2010 United States census, there were 1,138 people, 414 households, and 302 families residing in the city.

=== 2000 census ===
As of the census of 2000, there were 655 people, 270 households, and 180 families residing in the city. The population density was 532.2 inhabitants per square mile (205.5/km^{2}). There were 286 housing units at an average density of 232.4 per square mile (89.7/km^{2}). The racial makeup of the city was 97.25% White, 1.07% Asian, 0.31% from other races, and 1.37% from two or more races. Hispanic or Latino of any race were 6.41% of the population.

In 2000, there were 270 households, out of which 33.7% had children under the age of 18 living with them, 54.8% were married couples living together, 10.7% had a female householder with no husband present, and 33.3% were non-families. 29.3% of all households were made up of individuals, and 7.4% had someone living alone who was 65 years of age or older. The average household size was 2.43 and the average family size was 3.03.

In 2000, in the city, the population was spread out, with 27.2% under the age of 18, 8.4% from 18 to 24, 29.3% from 25 to 44, 24.0% from 45 to 64, and 11.1% who were 65 years of age or older. The median age was 36 years. For every 100 females, there were 92.6 males. For every 100 females age 18 and over, there were 87.1 males.

In 2000, the median income for a household in the city was $43,125, and the median income for a family was $58,750. Males had a median income of $39,375 versus $27,031 for females. The per capita income for the city was $20,287. About 9.8% of families and 10.1% of the population were below the poverty line, including 15.7% of those under age 18 and 14.6% of those age 65 or over.

==== Controversial 2000 census data ====
In a story that wound up on the front page of The New York Times, many of the 2000 census numbers were disputed by the City Clerk of San Antonio based on the fact the city had 336 residential water customers at the time. The clerk further asserted that most of the residents received their mail via post office box, which the US Census Bureau would not send forms to. City officials speculated that the population that year was probably closer to 900, which would be more consistent with the growth reflected in data collected in other cities throughout the county, as well as Pasco County as a whole. The 2010 census count of 1,138 residents was considered to be much more accurate.

== Education ==
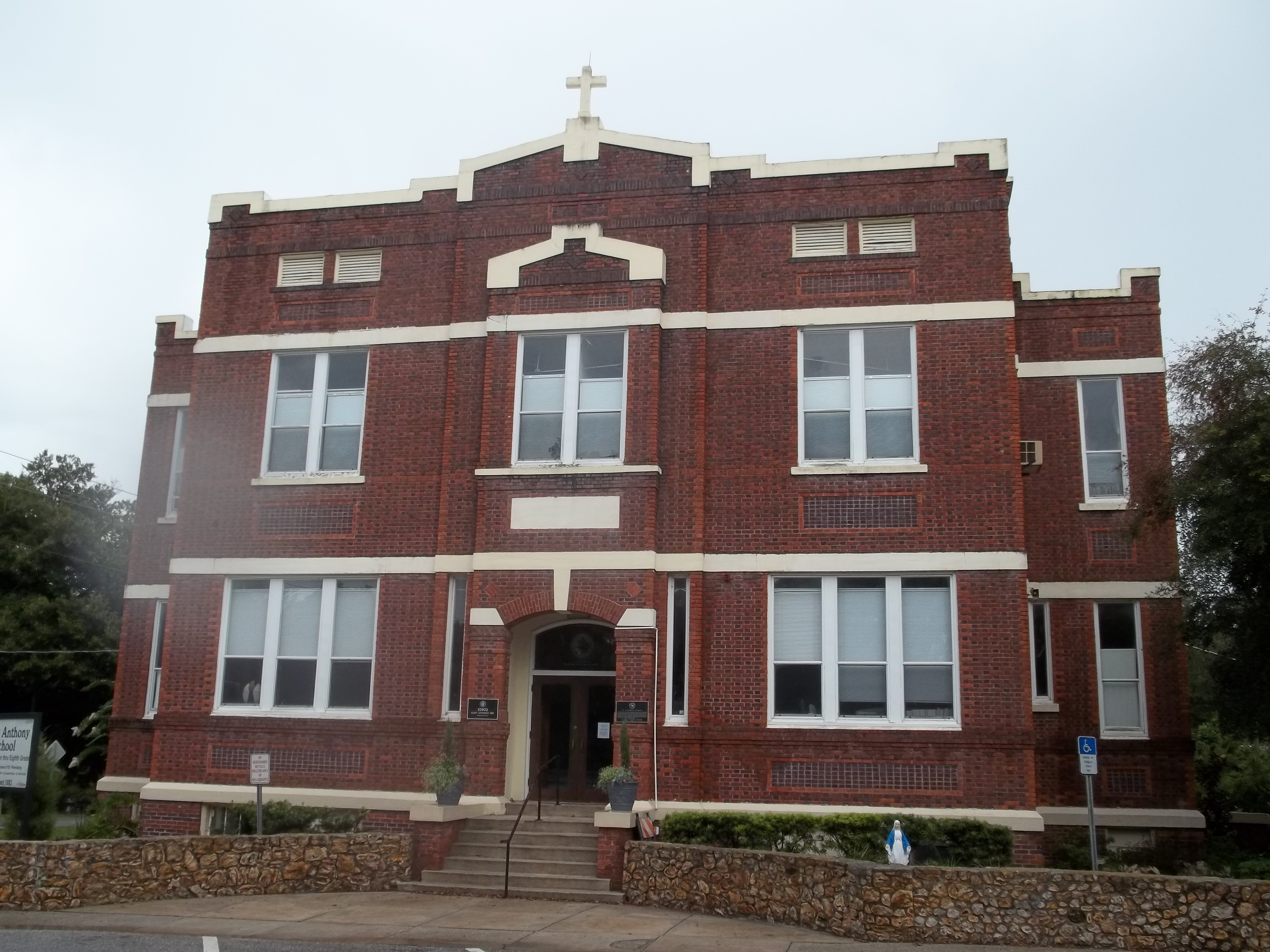
St. Anthony Catholic School, est. 1884

San Antonio is home to two schools. Saint Anthony Catholic School (grades PreK–8) traces its roots to the Fall of 1883 when local widow Cecilia Morse began teaching colony children in her home. By April 1884 it was officially established as a Catholic school and is by far the oldest school of any kind in Pasco County. In fact it actually predates the county by several years. San Antonio Elementary (grades K–5) was founded 98 years later in 1981 and though its campus lies entirely within San Antonio's city limits, its mailing address is actually Dade City, Florida. Holy Name Academy (grades 1–12) was established in 1889 as an "all-girls" boarding school by the Benedictine Sisters of Florida, but moved to the neighboring town of St. Leo in 1911.

== Notable person ==
- Chris Arnade, former Wall Street trader and documentarian, grew up in San Antonio
