= Saint Leo University =

Catholic university in St. Leo, Florida, US

- Former name: Saint Leo College (1889–1999)
- Motto: One Pride. All In.
- Type: Private university
- Established: 1889 (established). Re-established as a college in 1959.
- Religious affiliation: Catholic (Order of Saint Benedict); Holy Name Monastery; Saint Leo Abbey
- Academic affiliations: Association of Benedictine Colleges and Universities
- President: Jim Burkee
- Academic staff: 565
- Students: 10,231
- Location: St. Leo, Florida, U.S. 28°20′16″N 82°15′25″W
- Campus: Rural
- Colors: Green & gold
- Nickname: Lions
- Sporting affiliations: NCAA Division II – Sunshine State
- Mascot: "Fritz"
- Website: saintleo.edu

Saint Leo University is a private Catholic university in St. Leo, Florida, United States. It was established in 1889. The university is associated with the Holy Name Monastery, a Benedictine convent, and Saint Leo Abbey, a Benedictine monastery. The university and the abbey are both named for Pope Leo the Great, bishop of Rome from 440 to 461. The name also honors Leo XIII, who was pope at the time the university was founded, and Leo Haid, then abbot of Maryhelp Abbey in North Carolina, now Belmont Abbey, who participated in founding the university and served as its first president.

The first Catholic college in Florida, Saint Leo is one of the fifteen largest Catholic colleges in the United States. It enrolls students at the traditional University Campus, through its Center for Online Learning, and at five regional Education Centers. University-wide, Saint Leo educates students from all 50 states, the District of Columbia, three U.S. territories, and more than 80 countries. As of 2023, total enrollment was 10,231.

Saint Leo was one of the first American universities to provide distance learning opportunities to students, beginning with educating military men and women in 1973 during the Vietnam era at the height of the anti-war movement. Saint Leo University offers more than 55 associate, baccalaureate, and master's degrees, and certificate programs and inaugurated its first doctoral program in 2013. The university website listed 437 faculty and staff members in June 2026.

== History ==
Saint Leo traces its history to August 10, 1881, when Edmund F. Dunne, a former chief justice of the Arizona Territory, gained control of 100,000 acres in Florida. He established a Catholic colony in an area that is now the city of San Antonio and the town of St. Leo.

To accommodate a number of German-speaking colonists, John Moore, Bishop of the Diocese of St. Augustine, wrote the abbot of Saint Vincent Archabbey in Latrobe, Pennsylvania to request a German-speaking priest. That request led to the Benedictine monks first arriving in the area. In 1888, Saint Vincent Archabbey transferred control of the colony to Mary Help of Christians Abbey (commonly called Maryhelp) in Belmont, North Carolina.

In February 1889, Leo Haid, Abbot of Maryhelp Abbey, accepted a gift from Edmund Dunne of 36 acres on Lake Jovita for the founding of a Benedictine College. That same month, Benedictine nuns arrived from Allegheny, Pennsylvania.

On March 11, 1889, they founded Holy Name Monastery. Saint Leo College and Saint Leo Abbey were founded on June 4, 1889. St. Leo College, the original name of the institution, opened its doors on September 14, 1890. The first student to arrive was 12 years old. He and six others were enrolled on the first day, and the student body grew to 32 for the 1890–1891 school year. The first five students graduated in June 1893 with Master of Accounts degrees.

In 1898, before it was legal in Florida for black and white students to attend school together, Saint Leo enrolled a black student—Rudolph Antorcha from Cuba. Today, he and the welcoming Benedictines are honored with a sculpture titled A Spirit of Belonging, which was dedicated at University Campus in 2013.

Over the years, the school went through a series of varying focuses and name changes: St. Leo's College initially, then St. Leo Military College (1890–1903), St. Leo College (1903–17), St. Leo College Preparatory School (1917–18), Saint Leo College (1918–20), St. Leo College High School (1920–23), St. Leo Academy (1923–27), Benedictine High School (1927–29), Saint Leo College Preparatory School (1929–64), Saint Leo College (1959–99), and finally Saint Leo University (1999–present). During that time, it served as a military college within three different periods.

Saint Leo College Preparatory School operated from 1929 to 1964. In addition, Saint Leo returned to its college roots in 1959 and opened a junior college, with the first junior college graduates earning their associate degrees in 1961. The monks managed both the junior college and the prep school from 1959 to 1964. The Saint Leo College Prep School athletic teams were known as the Lions, and their colors were purple and gold. The Saint Leo College teams were known as the Monarchs, using green and gold as colors. In 1999, the Saint Leo athletic teams re-adopted the Lions name.

In 2011, Saint Leo University created an anthropomorphic lion mascot named Fritz. The name was a reference to a series of Saint Bernard dogs bearing that name, all owned by Charles Mohr, who served as the first abbot of Saint Leo Abbey from 1902 to 1931.

The Benedictine sisters at Holy Name Monastery, its neighboring community, closed their Holy Name Academy in 1963 and assisted Saint Leo, which transitioned to a four-year program.

Saint Leo College conferred its first bachelor's degree on April 23, 1967, on 51 men and 13 women. The college was accredited by the Southern Educational Association that November, retroactive to the degree date.

In 1973, the college responded to requests from the armed services to offer degree programs on U.S. military bases. More education centers followed—on military bases, on community college campuses, and at stand-alone facilities—in seven states.

In 1994, the college began to offer the Master of Business Administration and conferred its first MBA degrees in 1996.

In 1998, the university's Center for Online Learning was created, allowing students to take classes online from any location.

On August 24, 1999, Saint Leo College became Saint Leo University.

In 2002, the university expanded its online degree offerings to include the MBA program, enrolling 120 students in its first term. Saint Leo University introduced its first doctoral program, the Doctor of Business Administration (DBA), in 2013.

The university announced plans in July 2021 to merge with Marymount California University, another private Catholic university. The transition was expected to be completed by January 2023. However, plans for the merger fell through after St. Leo University's accreditor rejected its plans to acquire Marymount California University, and Marymount California University closed in August 2022. In February 2023, Saint Leo University closed some of its satellite locations, eliminated 111 faculty/staff positions, cut three degree programs, and phased out six NCAA division II teams, facing continuing enrollment declines and financial issues.

In January 2026, Saint Leo University announced the launch of the Lionova Institute, a new division focused on faith-anchored, technology-enabled education. The Lionova Institute will focus on expanding Saint Leo’s impact through online education, healthcare and nursing pathways, international partnerships, military-aligned education, and workforce-connected learning models. This initiative builds upon the legacy of former Saint Leo president Arthur F. Kirk Jr., who is widely regarded as a pioneer in nonprofit online education.

Since 1959, when the junior college was started, Saint Leo has had 12 presidents:

- John I. Leonard (1959–61)
- Rev. Stephen Herrmann (1961–68)
- Anthony W. Zaitz (1968–70)
- Rev. Marion Bowman (1970–71)
- Thomas B. Southard (1971–85)
- M. Daniel Henry (1985–87)
- Msgr. Frank M. Mouch (1987–96)
- Arthur F. Kirk Jr. (1997–2015)
- William J. Lennox Jr. (2015–18)
- Jeffrey D. Senese (2018–22)
- Edward Dadez (2022–25)
- Jim Burkee (2025–present)

== Undergraduate admissions ==
In 2024, Saint Leo University accepted 80.1% of undergraduate applicants, with admission standards considered moderate, applicant competition considered very low, and with those enrolled having an average 3.1 high school GPA. The college does not require submission of standardized test scores, but they will be considered when submitted. Those enrolled students that submitted test scores had an average 1090 SAT score (8% submitting scores) or an average 23 ACT score (4% submitting scores).

== Rankings ==
Academic rankings

National
- U.S. News & World Report: 395–434 out of 436

Saint Leo is ranked No. 395-434 in the National Universities category in the 2026 U.S. News & World Report Best Colleges rankings, which were released on September 23, 2025. The university also moved to No. 117 for Top Performers on Social Mobility, up from No. 181 in 2025. U.S. News reported that Saint Leo had a 20:1 Student-Faculty Ratio.

In August 2025, U.S. Veterans Magazine named Saint Leo University as one of its 2025 Veteran Friendly Yellow Ribbon Schools.

In November 2025, Saint Leo University earned top placements across multiple categories in the 2025 Military Times Best for Vets: Colleges rankings. Saint Leo's overall ranking, among 355 institutions reviewed, moved to No. 53. Saint Leo University also was ranked as No. 3 in Florida; No. 10 in private, nonprofit schools; No. 11 in in-person and online programs; No. 13 in Southeast schools; and No. 50 in general education.

=== Accreditation ===
The university is accredited by the Southern Association of Colleges and Schools Commission on Colleges (SACSCOC) to award associate, bachelor's, master's, specialist, and doctoral degrees. The Saint Leo School of Business received initial accreditation by the International Assembly for Collegiate Business Education in September 1999. In 2014, accreditation was obtained from the Accreditation Council for Business Schools and Programs (ACBSP).

Saint Leo University's degree program in social work is accredited by the Commission on Accreditation of the Council on Social Work Education (MSW, BSW, and bridge programs). The university's undergraduate sport business program and MBA sport business concentration are accredited by the Commission on Sport Management Accreditation. The university has teacher education programs approved by the Florida Department of Education.

In December 2023, the Southern Association of Colleges and Schools Commission on Colleges put Saint Leo University on probation due to concerns about its financial responsibility standards. In December 2024, the commission found Saint Leo University in compliance with regulations and removed the probationary status.

In May 2025, the Commission on Collegiate Nursing Education (CCNE) granted accreditation to Saint Leo University's Bachelor of Science in Nursing (BSN) program. The accreditation is effective retroactively to November 2024.

In September 2026, Saint Leo University became the first Florida institution to offer an accredited reduced-hour degree program. The Reduced-Hour Bachelor's of Business Analytics received approval from the SACSCOC. The program will launch in January 2027.

== Student life ==
=== Greek life ===
As of July 2025, there were eleven fraternities and sororities on campus. To join a chapter, a student must be taking a minimum of 12 credit hours, have a 2.5 cumulative grade point average, and be enrolled as an undergraduate. Significant chapter events include Greek Unity Week, Hazing Prevention Week, New Member Connection Events, and the Association of Fraternal Leadership & Values Conference. In July 2025, the university listed the fraternities and sororities, as follows.

IFC Fraternities	Tau Kappa Epsilon (TKE)	Kappa Sigma (ΚΣ)	Sigma Alpha Epsilon (ΣΑΕ)
NPC Sororities	Sigma Sigma Sigma (ΣΣΣ)	Alpha Sigma Tau (ΑΣΤ)	Theta Phi Alpha (ΘΦΑ)
NPHC Organizations	Alpha Phi Alpha (ΑΦΑ)	Sigma Gamma Rho (ΣΓΡ)	
Local Organizations	Gamma Upsilon sorority (ΓΥ)	Sigma Lambda fraternity (ΣΛ)	
Cultural Organizations	Sigma Lambda Gamma (ΣΛΓ)		

=== Athletics ===
Saint Leo University's athletic teams are known as the Lions. They participate as a member of the National Collegiate Athletic Association's Division II in the Sunshine State Conference (SSC). Men's sports include baseball, basketball, cross country, golf, lacrosse, soccer, and tennis; women's sports include basketball, cross country, golf, lacrosse, soccer, softball, tennis, acrobatics and tumbling, volleyball and beach volleyball. On March 17, 2025, the university's Athletics program announced the return of men's and women's track and field as a varsity sport for the 2025-2026 season. As part of this relaunch, Saint Leo is making a significant investment in its athletic facilities, including the construction of an eight-lane, 400-meter track. The university also added women’s flag football to its intercollegiate athletic programs, beginning in fall 2025 as club sport housed under the Athletics Department. On October 8, Saint Leo Athletics announced the return of men's and women's swimming, with the programs resuming as club sports for the 2027-28 academic year before transitioning to NCAA Division II for the 2028-29 season.

Saint Leo University won its first NCAA Division II National Title in 2016 when the Lions' men's golf team defeated Chico State, 3–2, in the NCAA DII Championship round at Green Valley Ranch Golf Club in Denver, Colorado as part of the 2016 NCAA Division II Spring Championships Festival. Saint Leo also played host to the 2016 NCAA Division II Cross Country Championships at The Abbey Course.

During the 2025-26 spring athletic season, multiple Saint Leo University athletic programs achieved national rankings, marking one of the most successful periods in the history of the university's athletics department. The Saint Leo softball team had a 38-game winning streak, a 29-1 record in Sunshine State Conference play, and were undefeated at home. They completed their season with a 54-3-1 record and the national championship, their first national title and the second for any team at the university. Other nationally ranked programs in the 2025-26 spring season included women's lacrosse (No. 4), men's tennis (No. 4), beach volleyball (No. 7), acrobatics and tumbling (No. 9nationally and No. 4 in NCAA Division II), men's golf (No. 13), men's lacrosse (No. 16), and women's golf (No. 20).

== Notable alumni and attendees ==
Saint Leo University has produced thousands of alumni, including Charles Henri Baker, a Haitian industrialist and presidential candidate; former politicians Richard Corcoran and Ed Narain; Cerelyn J. Davis, Memphis Police Department chief; and former Major League Baseball player Bob Tewksbury (attended, did not graduate). Celebrity alumni include actors Lee Marvin and Desi Arnaz.

Saint Leo University served as a filming location for the 1999 feature film Instinct, which included scenes shot in Selby Hall with actors Sir Anthony Hopkins and Cuba Gooding, Jr.

== WLSL-LP FM 92.7 ==
On October 19 2015, Saint Leo University received a license for a low-power FM station to operate on 92.7 MHz with a call sign of WLSL-LP. The station's studio facilities are located on campus with the transmitter and antenna facilities located at Pasco High School in Dade City. WLSL-LP serves the communities of Saint Leo, Dade City, San Antonio, Wesley Chapel, and Zephyrhills. Students can learn how to operate a radio station. As an example, business and marketing students can gain experience enlisting sponsors for shows and segments, and communication majors can produce or air their own segments.

== Gallery ==
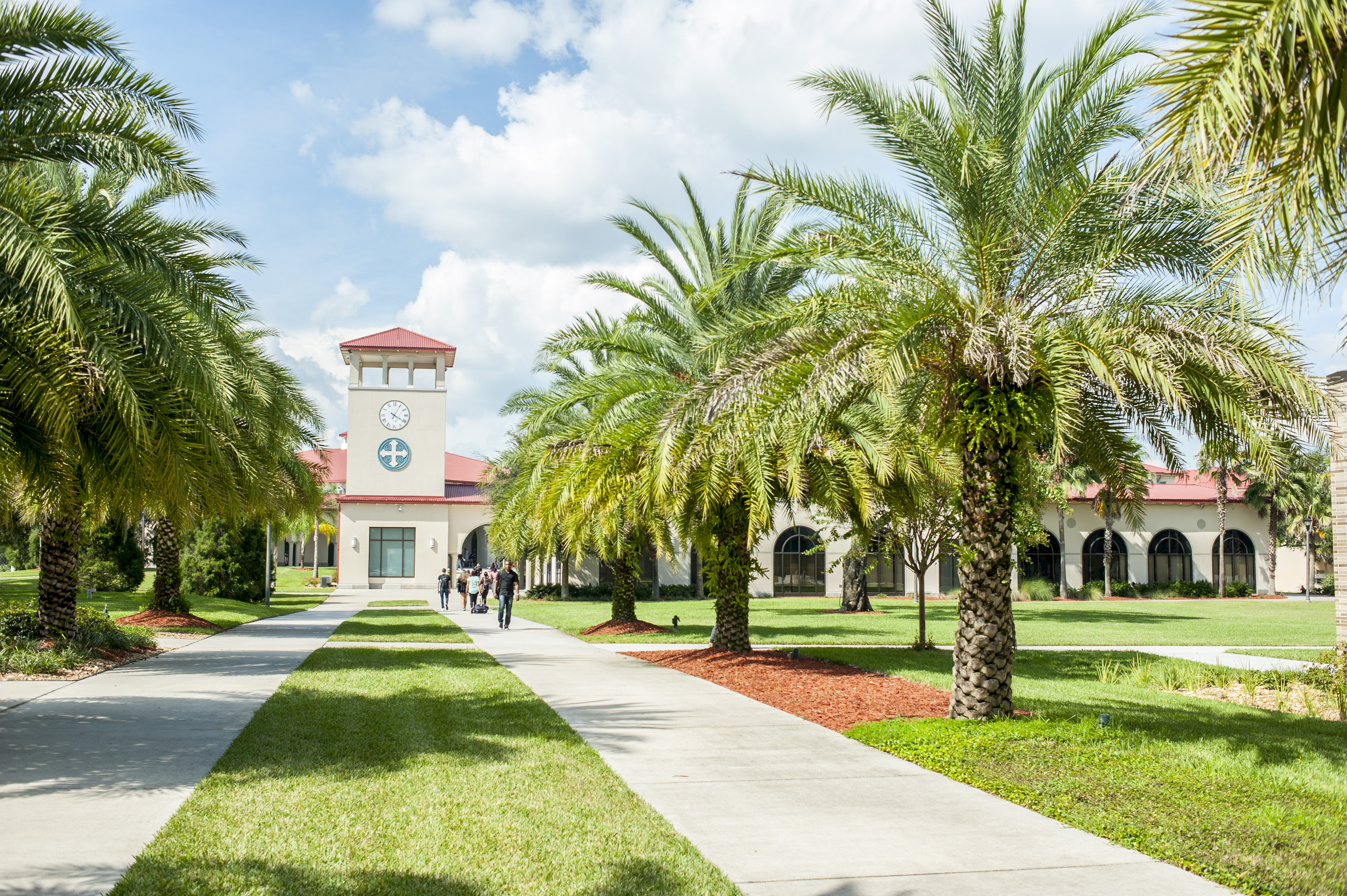
Main entrance

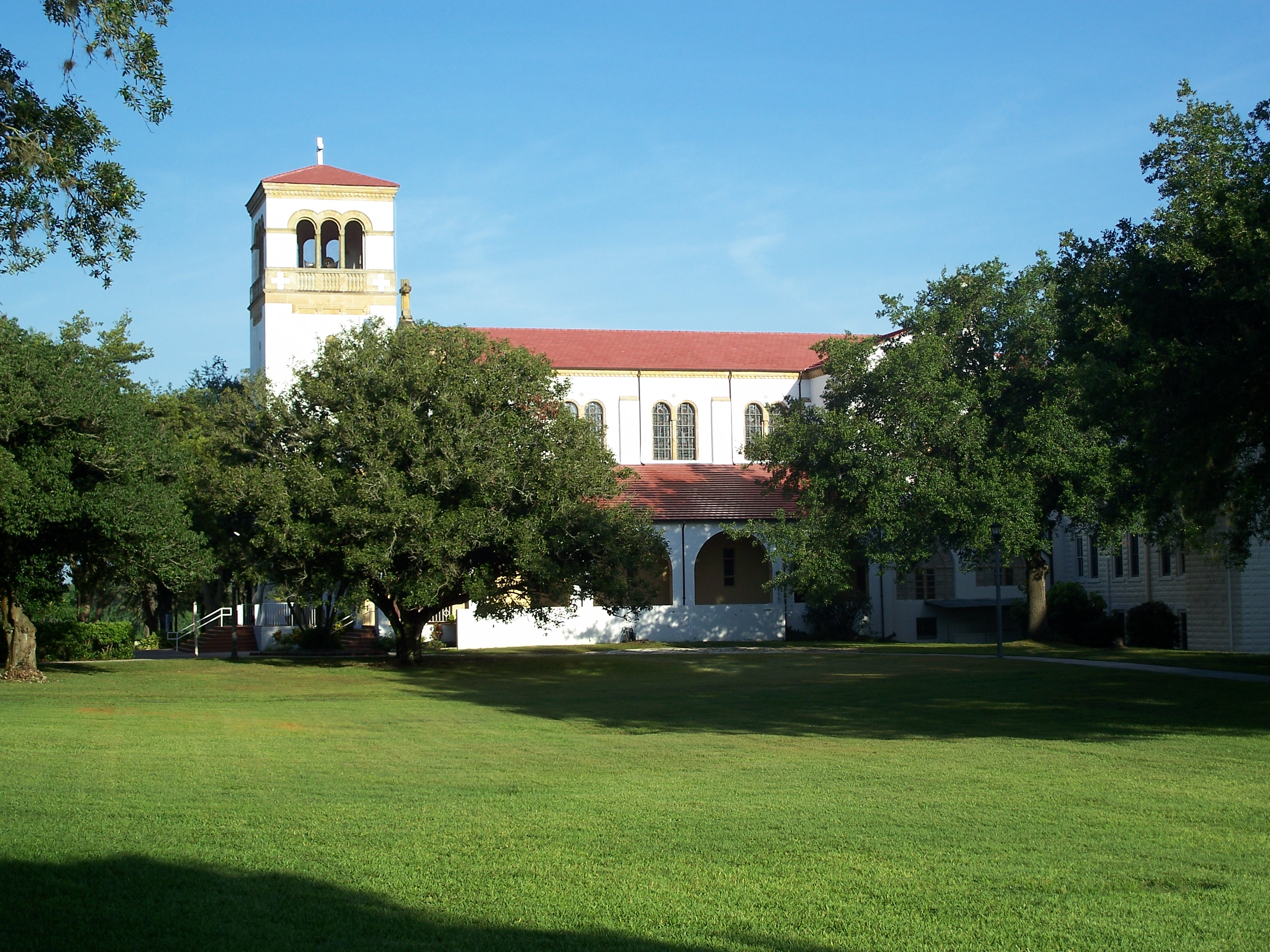
Saint Leo Abbey Church

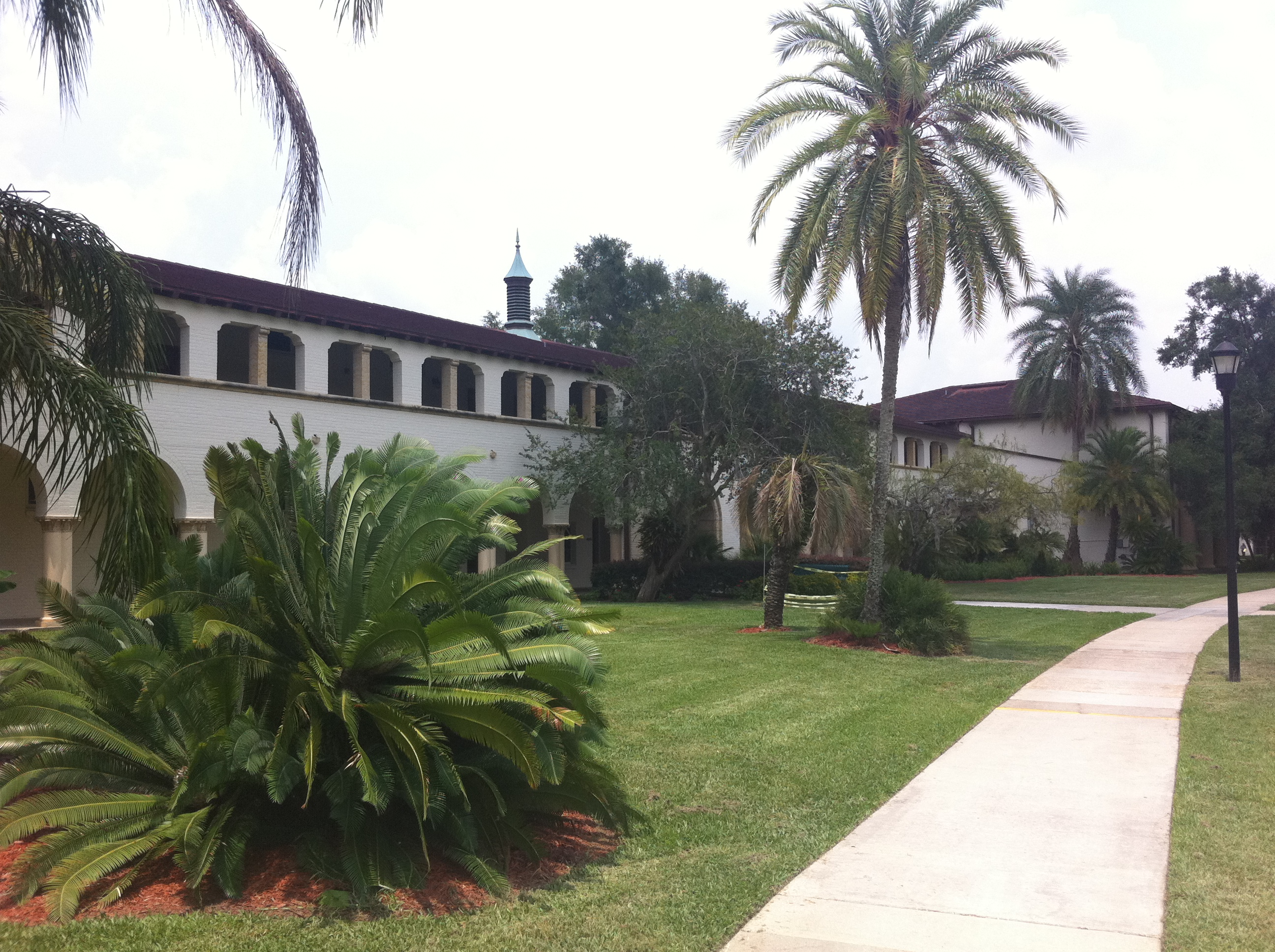
Saint Francis Hall on University's main campus

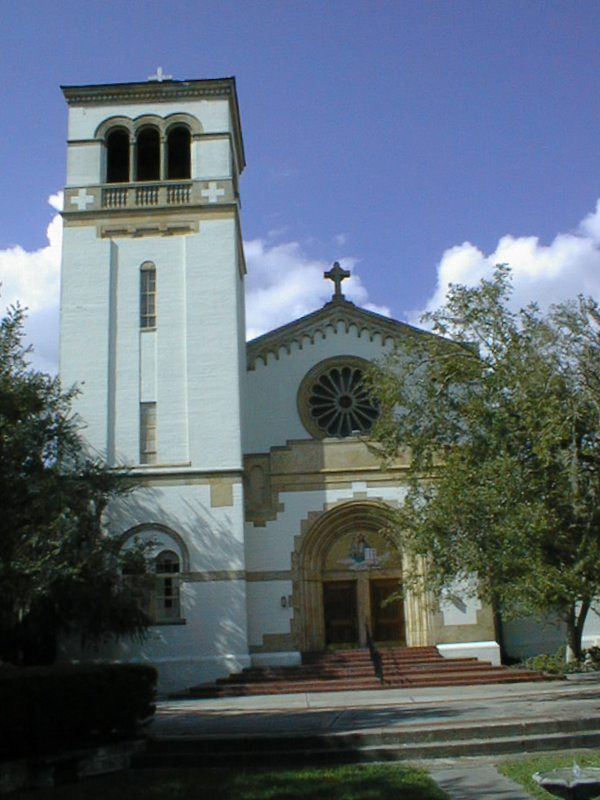
The St. Leo Abbey Church

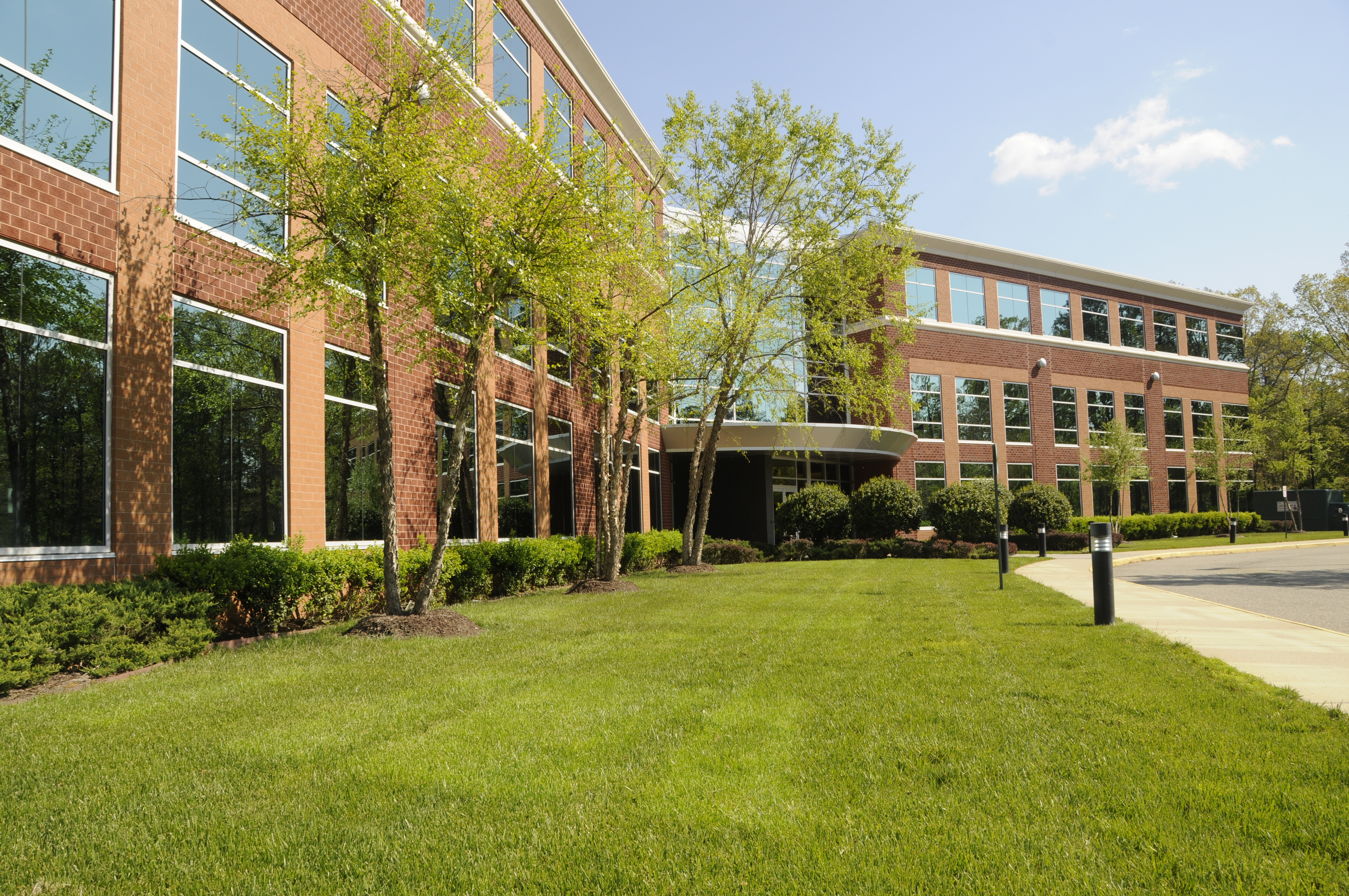
The Newport News (VA) Education Office

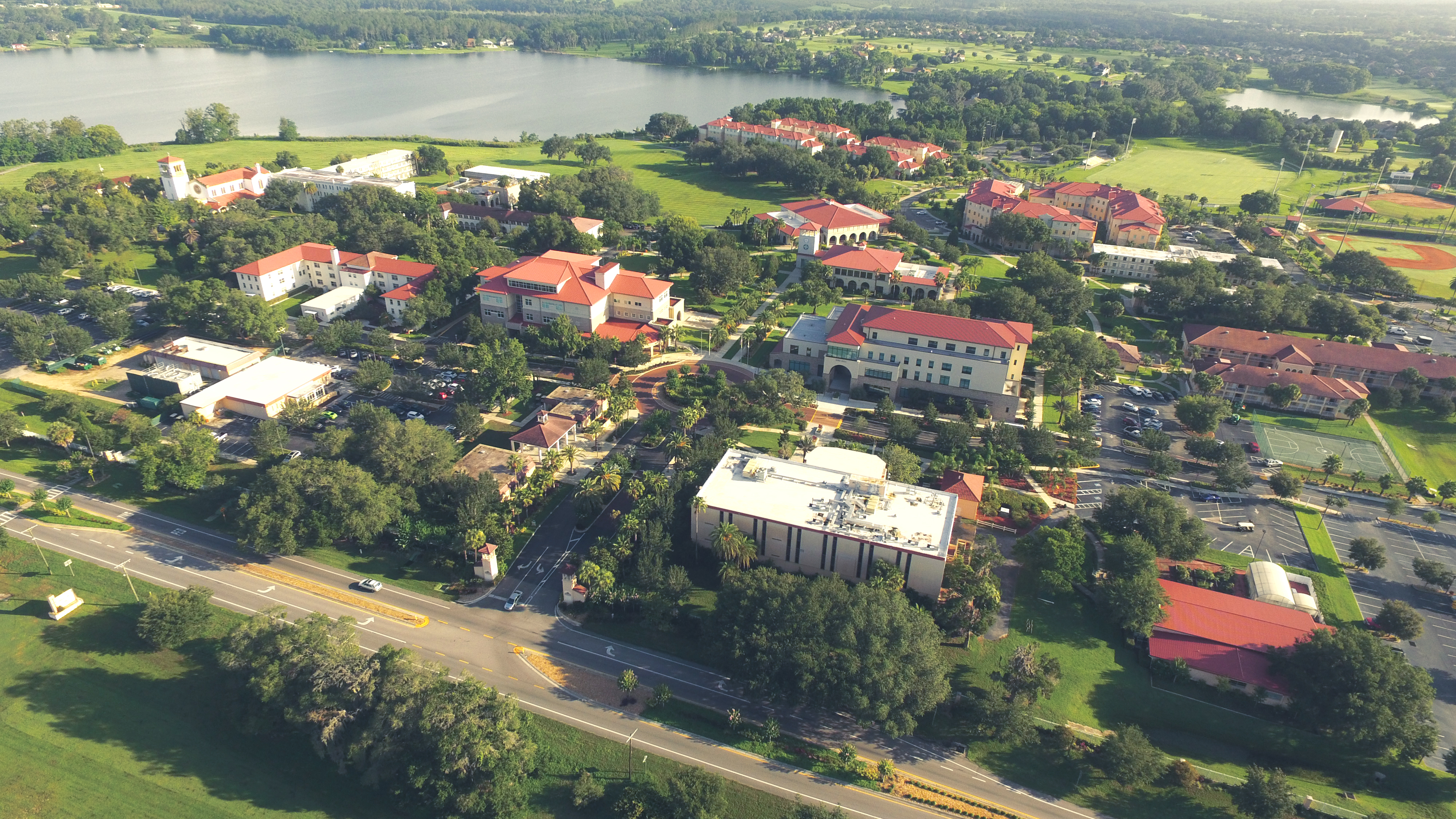
Aerial view
