= Edmund Francis Dunne =

American jurist (1835–1904)

Chief Justice, Arizona Territorial Supreme Court
- In office July 6, 1874 – February 1, 1876
- Nominated by: Ulysses S. Grant
- Preceded by: John Titus
- Succeeded by: C. G. W. French

Personal details
- Born: July 30, 1835 Little Falls, New York
- Died: October 4, 1904 (aged 69) Baltimore, Maryland
- Party: Union, Republican
- Spouse: Josephine Cecelia Warner
- Children: Eugene O'Dunne, Brian Boru Dunne
- Profession: Attorney

Count Edmund Francis Dunne (July 30, 1835 – October 4, 1904), born Edmund Francis O'Dunne, was an American politician and jurist who served as chief justice of the Supreme Court of Arizona Territory. During his early career he served in the California State Legislature and as a member of the Nevada constitutional convention. His later life was spent building the town of San Antonio, Florida.

== Background ==
Dunne was born on July 30, 1835, in Little Falls, New York, the eldest of five children to John and Eleanor O'Dunne. Of Irish ancestry, he was a "rectilineal descendant of Tiege Reagh O'Dunne" on his father's side and descended from Cormac, second son of Tiego IV of Iregan on his mother's. A year after his birth, Dunne's family moved to Ohio. There his father, a prosperous businessman, helped Irish immigrants to settle. Details of Dunne's education are unknown but the judge's broad background in history and theology combined with fluency in multiple languages indicates extensive schooling.

In 1852, Dunne and his father went to prospect for gold in California. After several years the pair brought the rest of the family west to live with them on a farm. About this time Dunne obtained his legal education in San Francisco. In 1852 he worked to establish a Catholic colony in Mexico.

== Political career and family ==
During his youth, Dunne was a Douglas Democrat but joined the Union Party following the outbreak of the American Civil War. He was elected in 1862 to represent Sonoma County, California in the California State Legislature. Upon completing his term in 1863, Dunne moved to Humboldt County, Nevada Territory.

A year after his arrival, Dunne was a member of the Nevada constitutional convention. Following statehood he was elected a district court judge for Nevada's Sixth Judicial District in 1865 and 1866. Following his service on the state bench, Dunne established a legal practice in Washington D.C. that specialized in helping American citizens with legal claims against the Republic of Mexico.

During this time period, Dunne made a number of trips to Europe. He married Josephine Cecelia Warner of Vicksburg, Mississippi on October 30, 1872, at the Église Saint-Philippe-du-Roule in Paris. A later trip, in 1874, resulted in Dunne meeting with historians who determined he was "the legitimate legal heir of Iregan and chief of his tribe". The marriage produced five children, including respected Maryland judge, Eugene O'Dunne, and longtime Santa Fe society gossip columnist and author, Brian Boru Dunne (1878-1962). Josephine died of pneumonia in Dunne's Catholic Florida colony on January 1, 1883, at the age of 38. And so the couple's five children were brought by the colorful "Stagecoach Mary" Fields (with whom the Warners had a previous connection) to Judge Dunne's sister, Mother Mary Amadeus Dunne (1846-1919). His youngest child, Mary Eithne Dunne, died in 1886 at age 5. Mother Amadeus was herself the mother superior of an Ursuline convent in Toledo, Ohio and would later become a prominent missionary to the Native-American peoples of both Montana and Alaska. Dunne's two surviving daughters, Maria del Carmen (d. 1950) and Hilda (1876-1972), followed their aunt into the Ursuline Order in 1892 and 1893, later becoming Mother Annunciata and Mother Amata, respectively. The two also worked in the missions and schools of Montana, Idaho and Washington. Another relative of note, Dom Frederic Dunne (the first American Trappist abbot), was the eldest son of Judge Dunne's cousin and San Antonio, Florida co-founder Capt. Hugh Dunne.

== Arizona Territory ==
U.S. Senator William Morris Stewart, upon the advice of Arizona Territorial Governor Anson P. K. Safford, recommended Dunne to replace John Titus as Chief Justice of the Arizona Territorial Supreme Court. Safford likely knew Dunne from the time both had lived in Humboldt County. President Ulysses S. Grant made the nomination on March 6, 1874, with Senate confirmation coming on March 20. He took the oath of office on July 6, 1874. The new Chief Justice arrived with his family in late June and settled in Tucson. During his spare time he traveled throughout the territory with Governor Safford and was credited with planting Arizona's first orange orchard in late 1874.

In his role as a justice, Dunne was well regarded with his opinions considered clear, well-reasoned, and rigorous. Examples of his rulings include Grounds v. Ralph, 1 Arizona 227 (1875) which rejected an appeal by a justice of the peace on the grounds the appeal did not specify the nature of the supposed legal error and was for an amount less than required by statute, Ford v. Haynes, 1 Arizona 229 (1875) which determined a debtor could show preferential treatment to a creditor prior to filing for bankruptcy, and Thorne v. Bowers, 1 Arizona 240 (1875) which determined an intermediary who obtained a larger sum for a mining claim from a purchaser than agreed upon by the seller could keep the difference between the two prices.

The removal of Dunne came about for reasons other than his legal expertise. An ardent Catholic, the Chief Justice believed the church should handle all education in the Territory. He publicly expressed this belief in February 1875 in a speech before the 8th Arizona Territorial Legislature. He continued his efforts in newspaper columns over the next few months, some of which received attention on the Eastern Seaboard. The appeals went as far as calling for Catholics to stop paying taxes which supported public schools. With the resulting commotion, President Grant decided to remove Dunne in December 1875. The Chief Justice remained on the bench until the end of his January 3–26, 1876 court session, and his successor was sworn in on February 1, 1876.

== San Antonio, Florida ==
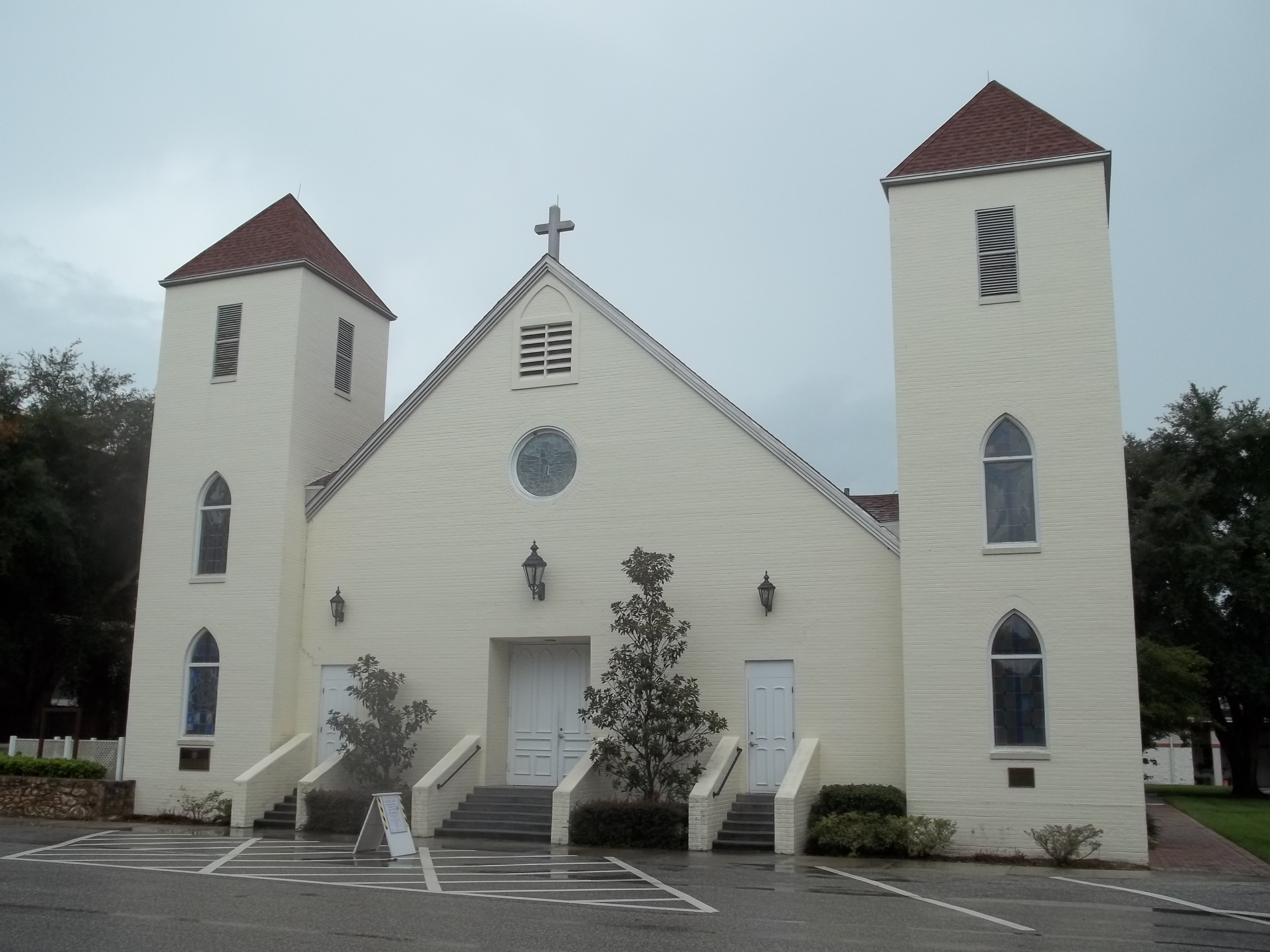
St. Anthony of Padua Catholic Church, est. 1883 in San Antonio, FL

After his removal from the bench, Dunne initially remained in Tucson where he opened a private legal practice. The next year he was living in Santa Fe, New Mexico and in 1878 moved to Utah where he served as legal counsel for a mining company. Dunne was granted a papal knighthood in 1876 and promoted to the rank of Commander three years later. He was finally created a Count by Pope Leo XIII in 1884.

Dunne gave the commencement address at Notre Dame in 1880 and was living in Chicago when he became involved with Hamilton Disston's 1881 efforts to purchase roughly sixteen percent of peninsular Florida. As his commission, in 1882 Dunne received 100,000 acres (400 km^{2}) of land west of Dade City, Florida near the shore of Lake Jovita – which he'd named to honor St. Jovita. The former judge used this land to found the Catholic colony of San Antonio, Florida. He worked to build the town until his departure in 1889. Before leaving the area, Dunne conveyed his residence and the surround property along the southern shore of Lake Jovita to the Benedictine monks in order that Saint Leo College and St. Leo Abbey be created out of it. San Antonio prospered until the Great Freeze of 1894–95 destroyed the local citrus groves. In 1976 the town's bicentennial commission placed a marker in the northwest corner of the plaza recognizing Dunne's contributions in establishing the community. In 2010 the Diocese of St. Petersburg added a Catholic Heritage Marker to the north facade of Saint Anthony of Padua Catholic Church in San Antonio, recognizing both Dunne's and the parish's part in the 19th century church history of Florida's West Coast. Today, over 135 years since Dunne first established it, the city numbers about 1,300 residents.

== After San Antonio and death ==
After leaving the area Dunne practiced law with his son Eugene in Jacksonville, FL at the firm of Dunne and O'Dunne. In his later years Dunne was a prominent Catholic lay writer and orator. His final two years were spent fighting an illness from which he died at St. Agnes Sanitarium in Baltimore, Maryland on October 4, 1904. Obituaries indicate that he also suffered from paralysis during his stay at St. Agnes. He was buried in Baltimore's New Cathedral Cemetery.
