= Morse–Barber House =

Historic house in Massachusetts, United States

- U.S. National Register of Historic Places
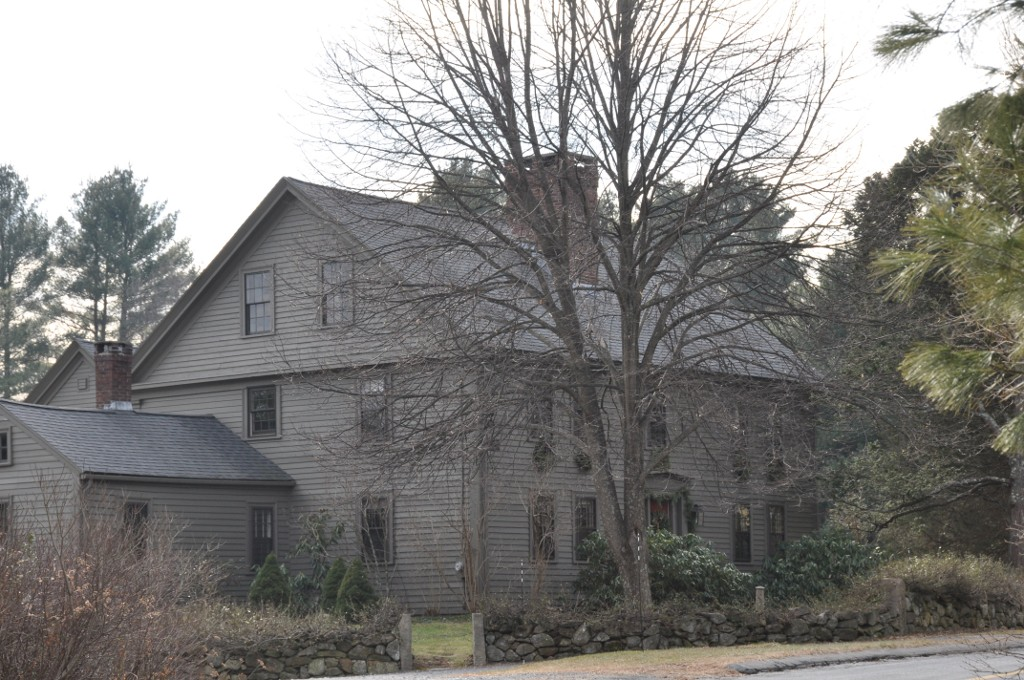

- Location within Massachusetts Location within the United States
- Location: 46 Forest Street, Sherborn, Massachusetts
- Coordinates: 42°13′14″N 71°21′23″W
- Built: c.1674 (MACRIS)
- Architectural style: First Period, Federal, Greek Revival
- MPS: Sherborn MRA
- NRHP reference No.: 86000493
- Added to NRHP: January 3, 1986

The Morse–Barber House is a historic house in Sherborn, Massachusetts. Architectural evidence suggests that this 2 1/2-story frame house has at its core a First Period structure that may date to the early 1670s, making it the oldest building in Sherborn. The property also has a barn dating to the late 18th or early 19th century. The property was listed on the National Register of Historic Places in 1986.

== Description and history ==
The Morse–Barber House is located on the southeast side of Forest Street in southeaster Sherborn, just west of the Rocky Narrows Reservation and the railroad tracks. The house and accompanying barn are set close to the street, the house sheltered from the road by a fringe of trees. The main house is a 2 1/2-story wood-frame structure, five symmetrically placed bays in width, with a side-gable roof and a large central chimney. The western portion of the structure, a three-bay two-story section that is one room deep, may have been built around 1670 by Joseph Morse, the son of one of Sherborn's first land grant recipients. Morse's home is known to have been the site of the community's first religious services, until a proper meeting house was built in the 1680s. The house, which now has Federal and Greek Revival exterior styling, was in the Barber family from the mid-18th century to the late 19th century.

The barn is set northeast of the house and is oriented parallel to the road. It is a large structure, measuring about 40 by 70 feet (12 m × 21 m), with a gable roof and a large sliding door at the center of its main facade. Above this door is an extended multi-light rectangular transom window, with a sash window to the left of the door and another above in the gable. Attached to the building to the right of the door is a single-story equipment shed with two vehicle doors. The main barn matches in rough dimension a barn described in a 1798 inventory of the property; the attached shed is present in photographs from later in the 19th century.

== See also ==
- National Register of Historic Places listings in Sherborn, Massachusetts
- List of the oldest buildings in Massachusetts
