= Rev. Edmund Dowse House =

Historic house in Massachusetts, United States

- U.S. National Register of Historic Places
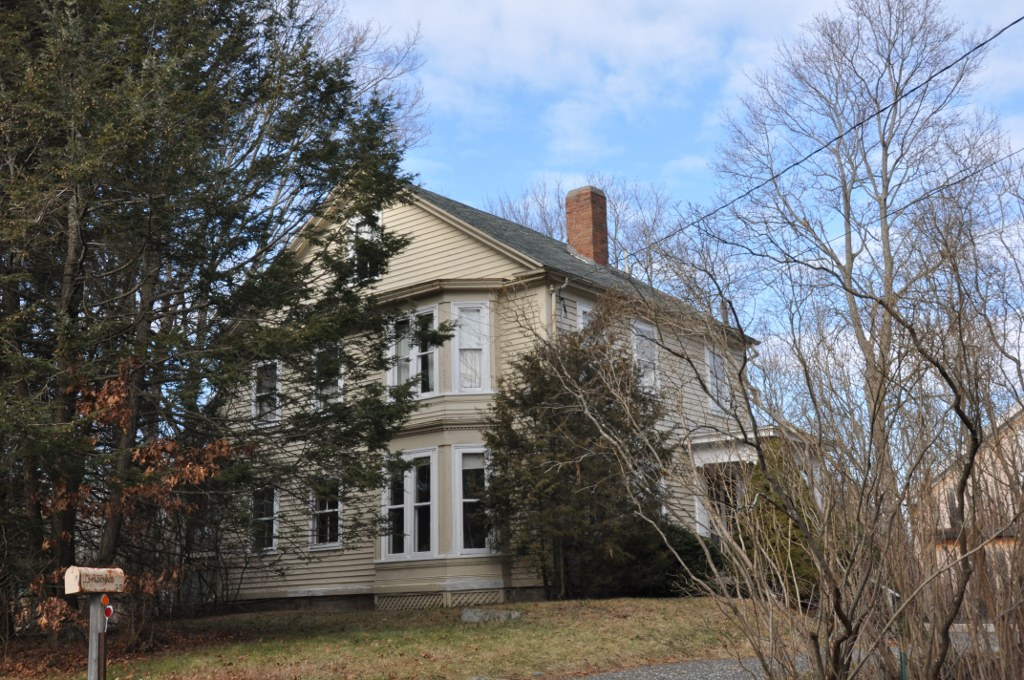

- Location within Massachusetts Location within the United States
- Location: 25 Farm Road, Sherborn, Massachusetts
- Coordinates: 42°14′19″N 71°21′55″W
- Built: 1838
- Architectural style: Greek Revival, Italianate
- MPS: Sherborn MRA
- NRHP reference No.: 86000499
- Added to NRHP: January 3, 1986

The Rev. Edmund Dowse House is a historic house in Sherborn, Massachusetts. The Greek Revival house was built in 1838 as a parsonage for the Rev. Edmund Dowse, the first pastor of the Evangelical Society (now the Pilgrim Church), and a member of the Massachusetts Senate. His son, William Bradford Homer Dowse, was born in the home in 1852. The house was listed on the National Register of Historic Places in 1986.

== Description and history ==
The house was built in 1838, during a significant period of growth in the town. The Dowse House is set on the north side of Farm Road, an east–west through road leading east from Sherborn center. Facing east, it is a 2 1/2-story wood-frame structure, three bays wide, with a side-facing gable roof and claobpard siding. The main entrance is in the rightmost bay, sheltered by a flat-roof portico with square Doric columns and Italianate brackets. A 1 1/2-story ell extends to the north side, and a two-story polygonal bay window projects on the south side.

== Edmund Dowse ==
Rev. Edmund Dowse, who was the first pastor of the Evangelical Society (now Pilgrim Church), and served in that position for 67 years. He was also politically active, serving in the state legislature and on town civic bodies. He served as a state senator in the 1869 Massachusetts legislature and 1870 Massachusetts legislature.

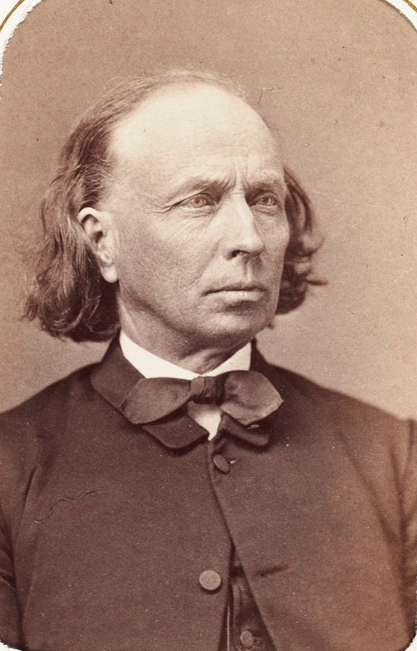
Edmund Dowse

His son William Bradford Homer Dowse was a successful lawyer and businessman who became president of Reed and Barton. He was educated at Harvard and was a patent lawyer. He was a major benefactor to the town, funding construction of Dowse Memorial Library (now town hall, built 1914), and the Memory Statue, built 1924.

The home was last purchased in 2023 and is undergoing extensive restoration and preservation.

== See also ==
- National Register of Historic Places listings in Sherborn, Massachusetts
