= Addington Gardner House =

Historic house in Massachusetts, United States

- U.S. National Register of Historic Places
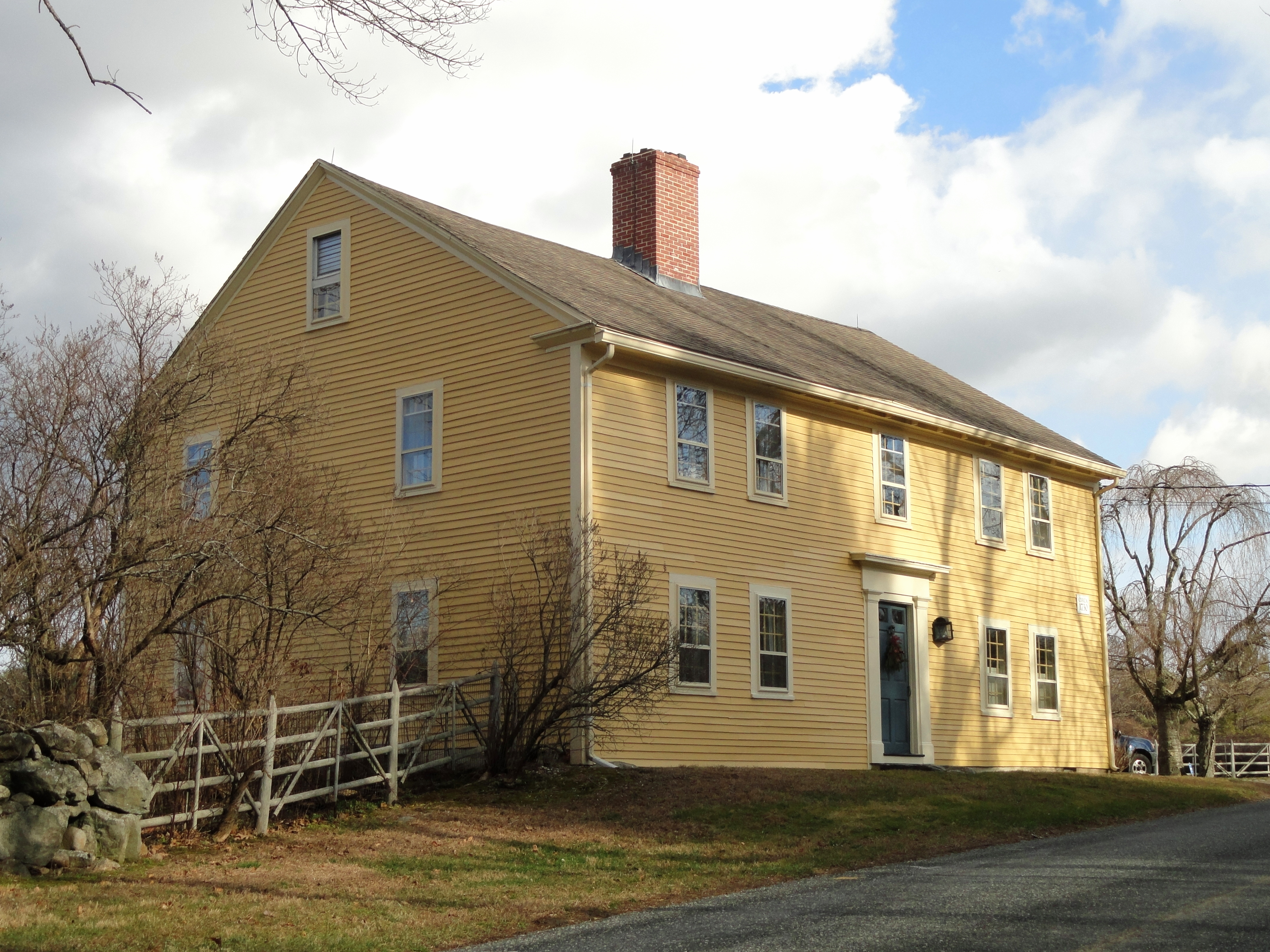

- Location within Massachusetts Location within the United States
- Location: 128 Hollis St., Sherborn, Massachusetts
- Coordinates: 42°12′58″N 71°23′55″W
- Area: 2.3 acres (0.93 ha)
- Built: 1730
- Architectural style: Colonial
- MPS: First Period Buildings of Eastern Massachusetts TR
- NRHP reference No.: 90000179
- Added to NRHP: March 9, 1990

The Addington Gardner House is a historic First Period house in Sherborn, Massachusetts. Its oldest portions dating to about 1730, it is one of the community's oldest surviving buildings, and a good example of transitional First-Second Period style. The house was listed on the National Register of Historic Places in 1990.

== Description and history ==
The Addington Gardner House stands in a rural residential area of southwestern Sherborn, at the northeast corner of Hollis Street and Western Avenue. It is a 2-12 story wood-frame structure, with a gabled roof, central chimney, and clapboarded exterior. The main facade is five bays wide, with a center entrance flanked by pilasters and topped by a corniced entablature. Windows are simply framed, with the second-floor windows butting against the eave. A single story ell, added c. 1800 projects from the rear, connecting the house to a later carriage house. The interior timbers show evidence of 18th-century construction methods consistent with a c. 1730 construction date. Beams are exposed in the front chambers of the main block, and the left front chamber has a fireplace surround with early Second Period carving.

The oldest portions of this house (possibly just the front rooms) were built c. 1730 by Addington Gardner. The house is a classic five-bay 2 1/2-story timber-frame structure, with a large central chimney. The house remained in the Gardner family until 1911, when it was sold to a local farmer and politician.

== See also ==
- National Register of Historic Places listings in Sherborn, Massachusetts
