= Eleazer Goulding House =

Historic house in Massachusetts, United States

- U.S. National Register of Historic Places
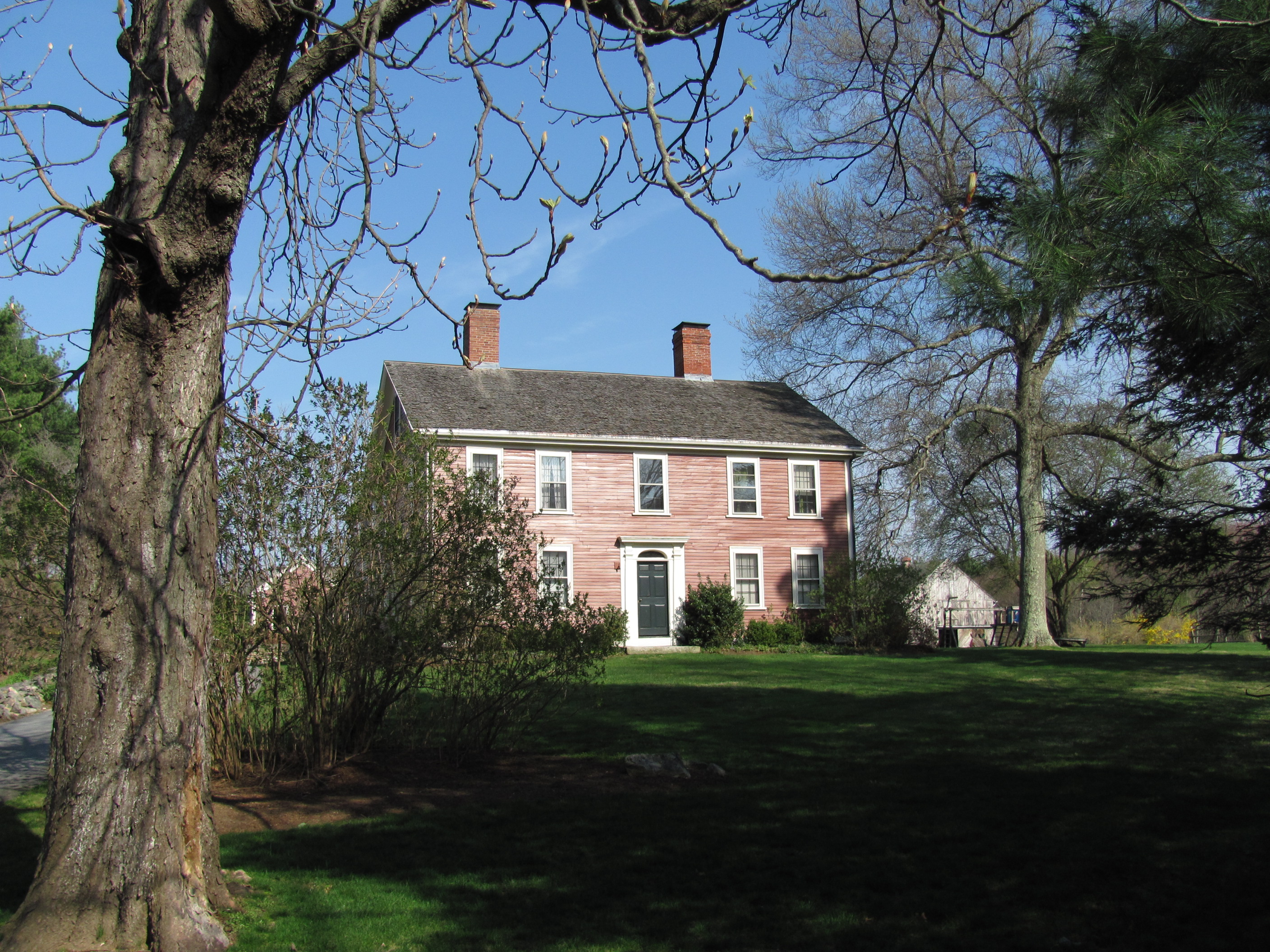
- Eleazer Goulding House

- Location within Massachusetts Location within the United States
- Location: Sherborn, Massachusetts
- Coordinates: 42°14′27″N 71°24′24″W
- Built: 1825
- Architect: Mann, Capt. Ebenezer
- Architectural style: Federal
- MPS: Sherborn MRA
- NRHP reference No.: 86000501
- Added to NRHP: January 3, 1986

The Eleazer Goulding House is a historic house at 137 Western Avenue in Sherborn, Massachusetts. The house was built in 1825 by Capt. Ebenezer Mann, a local master builder. The 2 1/2-story wood-frame house is a finely detailed and well-preserved example of Federal style, with a side gable roof, twin interior chimneys, and clapboard siding. Its main entrance is flanked by Doric pilasters, and topped by a dentillated cornice and fanlight. Possibly due to its country setting, Mann built it with simpler styling than houses he built in the village center around the same time.

The house was listed on the National Register of Historic Places in 1986.

== See also ==
- National Register of Historic Places listings in Sherborn, Massachusetts
