= Sherborn Center Historic District =

Historic district in Massachusetts, United States

- U.S. National Register of Historic Places
- U.S. Historic district
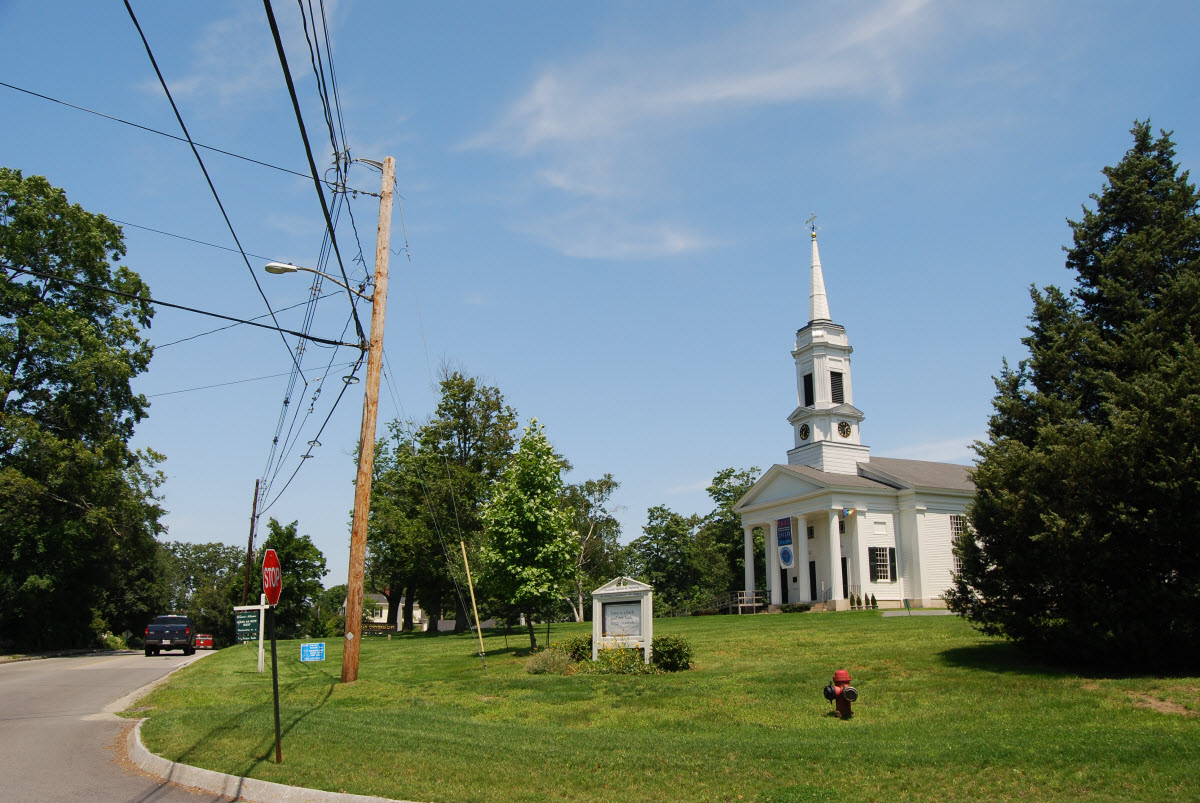

- Location within Massachusetts Location within the United States
- Location: Sherborn, Massachusetts
- Coordinates: 42°14′30″N 71°22′16″W
- Area: 85 acres (34 ha)
- Architect: Multiple
- Architectural style: Greek Revival, Late Victorian, Federal
- MPS: Sherborn MRA
- NRHP reference No.: 86000495
- Added to NRHP: January 3, 1986

The Sherborn Center Historic District is a historic district encompassing the civic heart and traditional center of Sherborn, Massachusetts. Its borders consist of Farm, Sawin, Washington, and North Main streets, Zion's Lane, and the CSX railroad tracks. The district, while predominantly residential in character, also contains an important cluster of civic and religious buildings. Notable among these are the Dowse Memorial Building, a Tudor Revival structure built in 1914 to house the town library; it now houses town offices. It was donated by William Bradford Home Dowse, who also funded the construction of the 1924 Memory Statue, the town's memorial to its war dead. (The library now occupies a modern building on Sanger Street, also located in the district but not contributing to its historic significance.)

Two churches stand in the district, both with original construction dates around 1830. The Pilgrim Church at 25 South Main Street was given an Italianate updating in the 1850s, while the First Parish Church at 11 Washington Street has Greek Revival styling. The Town Hall, located at 3 Sanger Street, is a rare unaltered example of the work of Worcester architects Boyden & Ball. It has classic Italianate styling, with deep, bracketed eaves, boldly quoined corners, and a cupola.

Only two things in the district survive from the early days of Sherborn, which was incorporated in 1674. Its first cemetery was laid out in 1689, and the older portion of the Flagg House (c. 1740) at 22 Washington Street is the only building in the center that predates 1750.

The district was listed on the National Register of Historic Places in 1986.

== See also ==
- National Register of Historic Places listings in Sherborn, Massachusetts
