= Charles D. Lewis House =

Historic house in Massachusetts, United States

- U.S. National Register of Historic Places
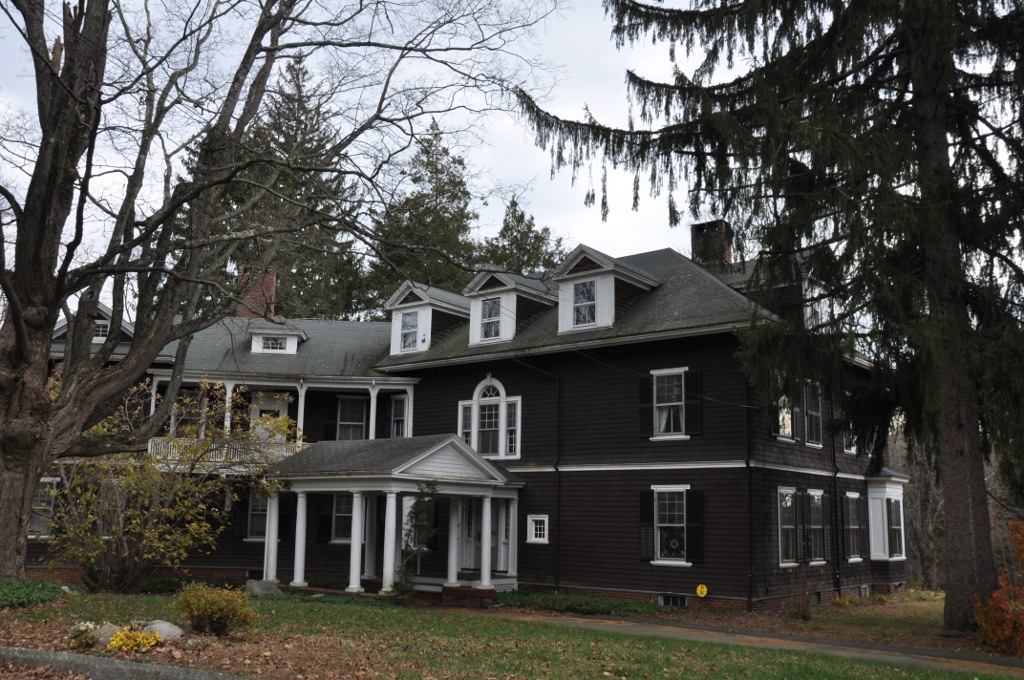

- Location within Massachusetts Location within the United States
- Location: 81 Hunting Lane, Sherborn, Massachusetts
- Coordinates: 42°14′58″N 71°23′0″W
- Area: 4.9 acres (2.0 ha)
- Built: 1905
- Architectural style: Colonial Revival, Shingle Style
- MPS: Sherborn MRA
- NRHP reference No.: 86000504
- Added to NRHP: January 3, 1986

The Charles D. Lewis House is a historic house in Sherborn, Massachusetts. It is a two-story wood-frame structure, set on a brick and rubblestone foundation, and exhibits informal Shingle style massing with elements of formal Colonial Revival detail. The house is built in a wide V-shape opening to the north, its main entrance south-facing with porches, but, within the angled facades to the north, a circular driveway and port-cochere entry, supported by Tuscan columns. It was built as a gentleman's farm and one of the town's earliest summer residences circa 1905, by Charles D. Lewis, a businessman whose family owned Lewis Wharf in Boston.

The house was listed on the National Register of Historic Places in 1986.

== See also ==
- National Register of Historic Places listings in Sherborn, Massachusetts
