= Joseph Cleale House =

Historic house in Massachusetts, United States

- U.S. National Register of Historic Places
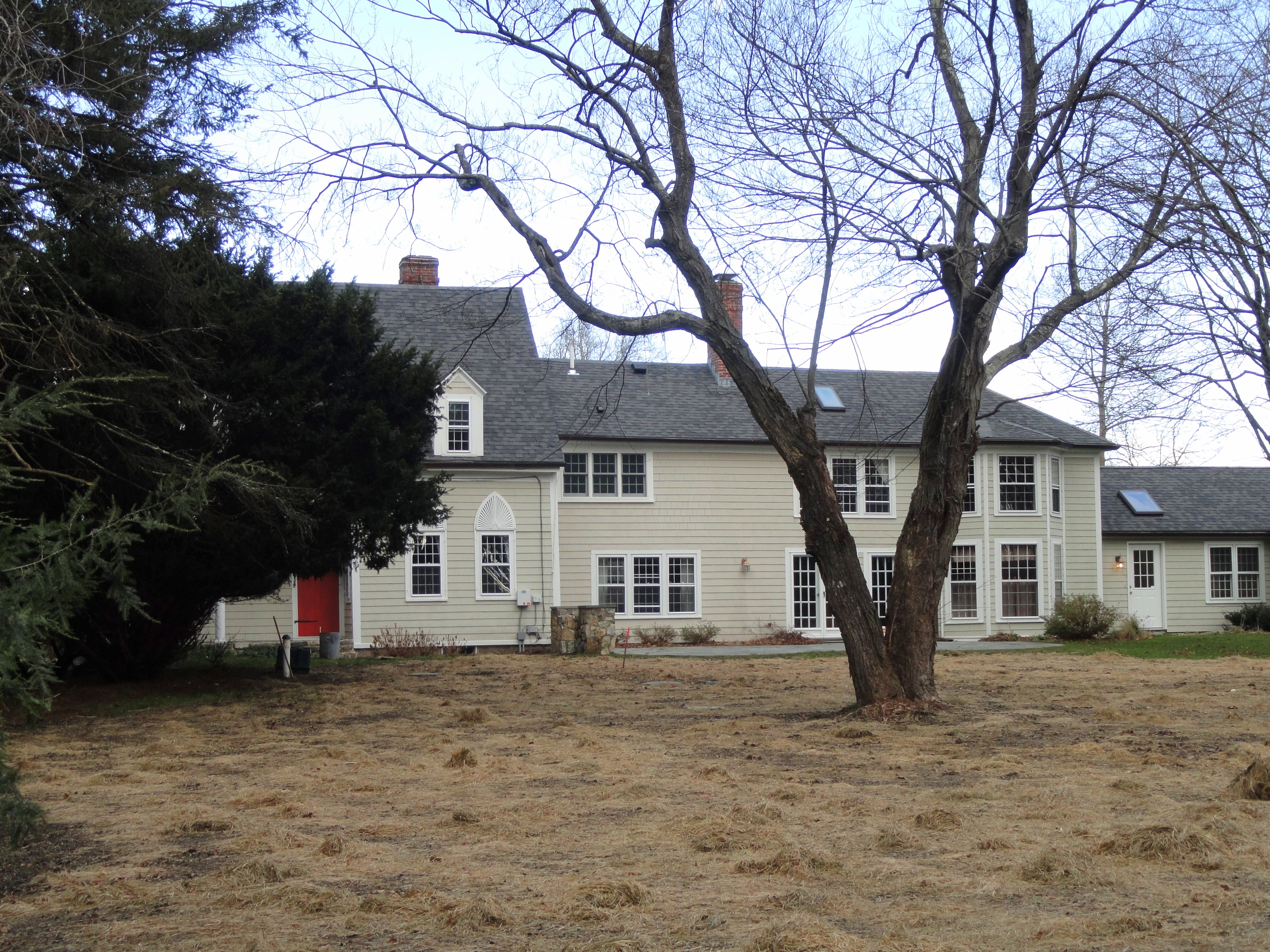

- Location within Massachusetts Location within the United States
- Location: 147 Western Avenue, Sherborn, Massachusetts
- Coordinates: 42°14′21″N 71°24′23″W
- Architectural style: Greek Revival, Federal
- MPS: Sherborn MRA
- NRHP reference No.: 86000498
- Added to NRHP: January 3, 1986

The Joseph Cleale House is a historic house located in Sherborn, Massachusetts.

== Description and history ==
It is a 2 1/2-story wood-frame house, with a front-facing gable roof, clapboard siding, and twin interior chimneys. A two-story hip-roofed ell extends to the rear of the main block. The house was built c. 1820–25, and is one of the town's best-preserved transitional Federal/Greek Revival houses. Its twin recessed porches are a distinctive feature not found in any older houses, as are the Gothic-looking window caps on the main block.

The house was listed on the National Register of Historic Places in 1986.

== See also ==
- National Register of Historic Places listings in Sherborn, Massachusetts
