= Henry Ware (Unitarian) =

American Unitarian preacher

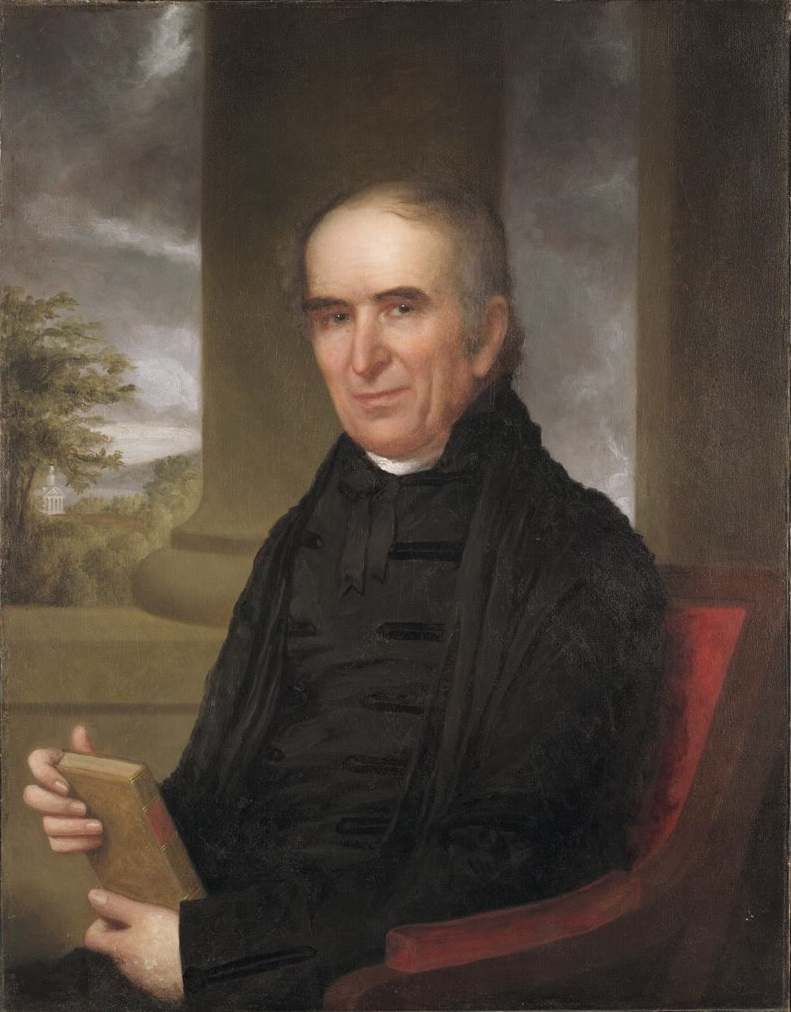
- Portrait by Charles Osgood, 1835
- Born: April 1, 1764; Sherborn, Massachusetts Bay
- Died: July 12, 1845 (aged 81); Cambridge, Massachusetts
- Education: Harvard College
- Occupations: Preacher, theologian
- Relatives: Henry Ware Jr. (son), Mary Lee Ware (granddaughter)

Henry Ware (April 1, 1764 – July 12, 1845) was a preacher and theologian influential in the formation of Unitarianism and the American Unitarian Association in the United States. Born in Sherborn, Massachusetts (in a house that survived into the 20th century), Ware was educated at Harvard College, earning his A.B. in 1785. He was from 1787 to 1805 the minister of the First Parish in Hingham, Massachusetts. He was elected a Fellow of the American Academy of Arts and Sciences in 1804. In 1805 he was elected to the Hollis Chair at Harvard, precipitating a controversy between Unitarians and more conservative Calvinists. He took part in the formation of the Harvard Divinity School and the establishment of Unitarianism there in the following decades, publishing his debates with eminent Calvinists in the 1820s. His son, Henry Ware Jr., followed his father as a Harvard Divinity professor and Unitarian theologian. He is also the grandfather of Mary Lee Ware through one of his other sons, Dr. Charles Eliot Ware - Mary and her mother (his daughter-in-law) being the patron sponsors of Harvard's famed Glass Flowers exhibit.

Henry Ware Sr. was married three times. From his first marriage there were seven daughters and three sons. From his third marriage there were five sons and four daughters.
