= Samuel Lee =

Samuel Lee may refer to:

- Samuel Lee (English minister) (1625–1691), English Puritan
- Samuel Lee (linguist) (1783–1852), English Orientalist and linguist
- Samuel Lee (judge) (1756–1805), businessman, judge and politician in New Brunswick
- Samuel Lee (American minister) (1803–1881), American minister, author, and legislator
- Samuel Phillips Lee (1812–1897), Civil War rear admiral
- Samuel Jones Lee (1844–1895), politician and lawyer from South Carolina
- Samuel Tak Lee (1939–2026), Hong Kong property billionaire
- Sammy Lee (diver) (Samuel Lee, 1920–2016), American diver and physician

== See also ==
- Sam Lee (disambiguation)
- Sammy Lee (disambiguation)
- Samuel Leigh (disambiguation)
