= Charles Holbrook House =

Historic house in Massachusetts, United States

- U.S. National Register of Historic Places
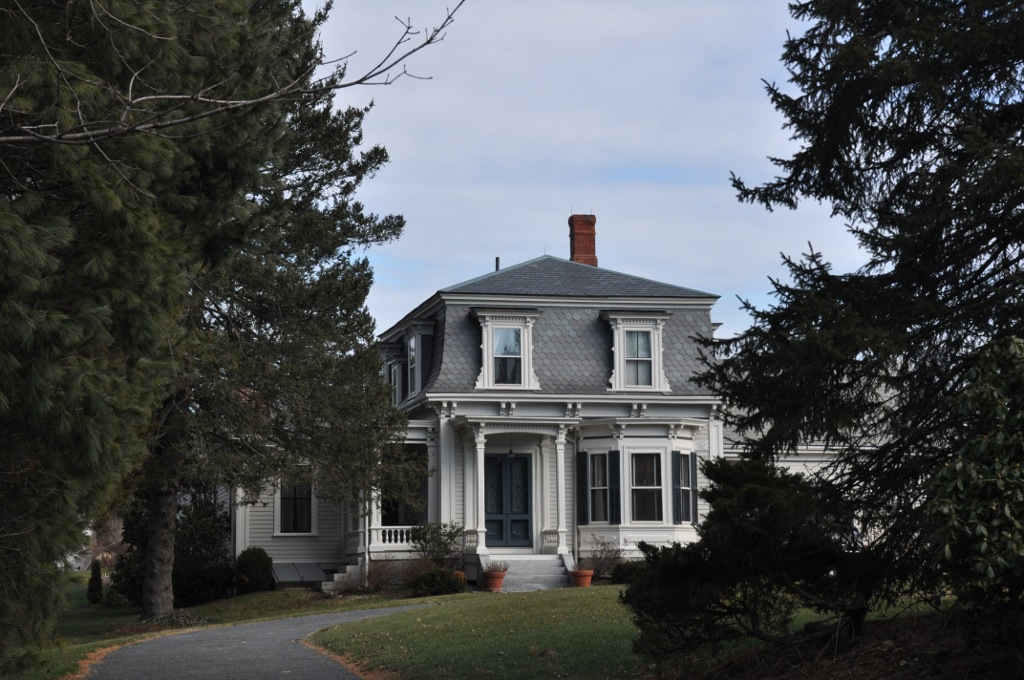

- Location within Massachusetts Location within the United States
- Location: 137 S. Main Street, Sherborn, Massachusetts
- Coordinates: 42°13′31″N 71°21′47″W
- Area: 6.2 acres (2.5 ha)
- Built: c. 1873
- Architectural style: Second Empire
- MPS: Sherborn MRA
- NRHP reference No.: 86000502
- Added to NRHP: January 3, 1986

The Charles Holbrook House is a historic house in Sherborn, Massachusetts. Built c. 1870–75, this modest house is the town's finest example of Second Empire styling. It was built for Charles Albert Holbrook (1846-1899), whose family operated a large apple cider mill in town. The house was listed on the National Register of Historic Places on January 3, 1986.

== Description and history ==
The house is located on the east side of South Main Street, at the northern edge of the rural village of South Sherborn. It is a 1-1/2, timber-framed structure, with a flared slate mansard roof and clapboard siding. A polygonal window bay projects from the right side of the front facade, with a flat-roof that has a bracketed cornice. The main roof line is also studded with paired brackets. The front entrance is shelter by a portico supported by slender square posts. A garage stands to the right of the house.

Although modest in its scale, it has high-style decoration unusual for a relatively rural location. A house at 5 Washington Street was a virtual copy of this one, until its mansard roof was destroyed by fire. This house was owned for many years by members of the Holbrook family, a major local producer of apple cider. The cider mill, of Jonathan Holbrook and Sons (Charles and John) operated between 1853 and 1909. It was located nearby in South Sherborn, and was billed as the world's largest cider-making operation.

== See also ==
- National Register of Historic Places listings in Sherborn, Massachusetts
