= H. G. Vaughn House =

Historic house in Massachusetts, United States

- U.S. National Register of Historic Places
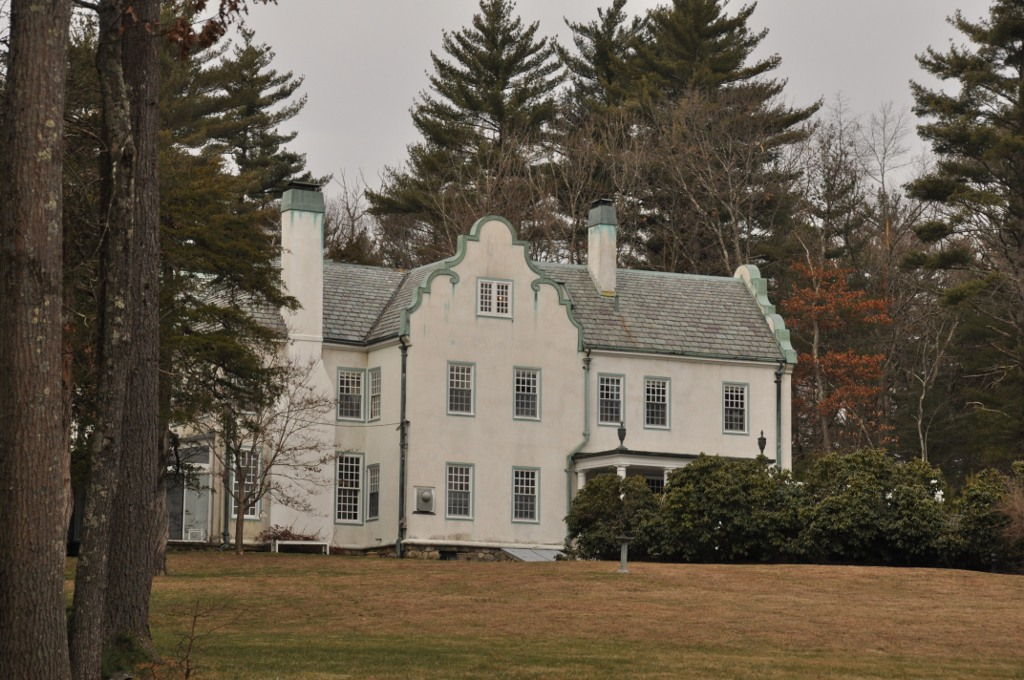

- Location within Massachusetts Location within the United States
- Location: 5 Sparhawk Road, Sherborn, Massachusetts
- Coordinates: 42°12′24″N 71°22′9″W
- Built: 1915
- Architect: Little & Browne
- MPS: Sherborn MRA
- NRHP reference No.: 86000511
- Added to NRHP: January 3, 1986

The H. G. Vaughn House is a historic summer estate house at 5 Sparhawk Road in Sherborn, Massachusetts.

== Description and history ==
The stucco-clad Dutch Colonial Revival house was designed by the Boston firm of Little & Browne and built in 1915. The L-shaped building has a marble courtyard in the crook of the L. It has four Dutch-inspired gables rising on the red tile roof, with sweeping curves and angular edges. The interior is decorated with 18th- and 19th-century New England architectural elements salvaged from other buildings, and some of its walls are decorated with murals showing Roman ruins and Dutch street scenes. Henry G. Vaughn, the owner, was a prominent Boston lawyer.

The house was listed on the National Register of Historic Places on January 3, 1986.

== See also ==
- National Register of Historic Places listings in Sherborn, Massachusetts
