= Woodland Farm–Leland House =

Historic house in Massachusetts, United States

- U.S. National Register of Historic Places
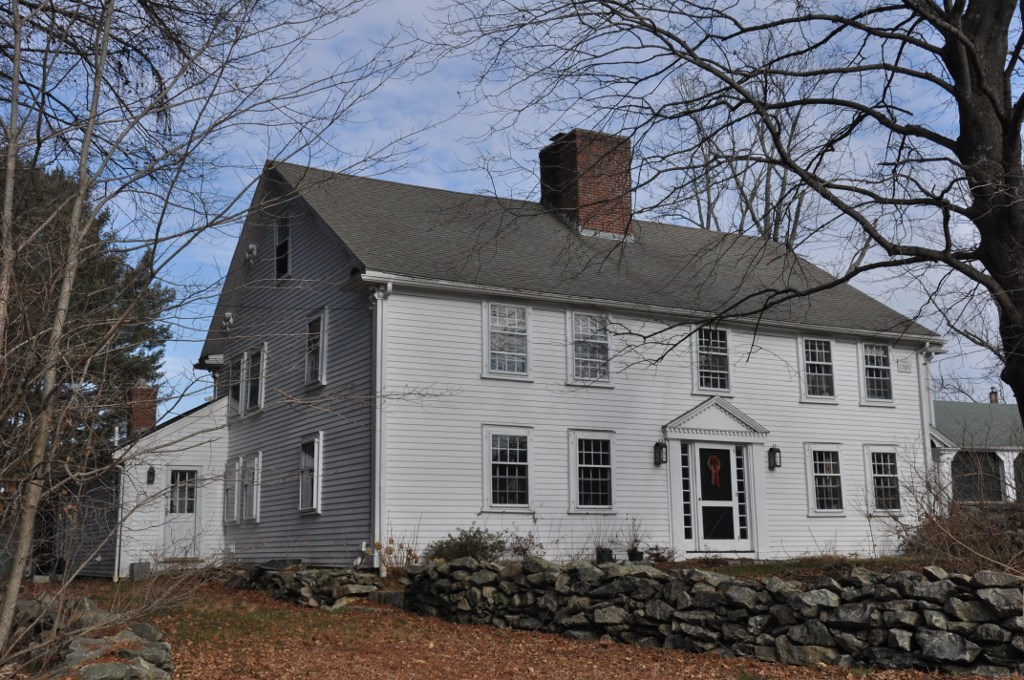

- Location within Massachusetts Location within the United States
- Location: 104 Woodland Street, Sherborn, Massachusetts
- Coordinates: 42°13′19″N 71°22′54″W
- Built: 1760
- Architectural style: Georgian
- MPS: Sherborn MRA
- NRHP reference No.: 86000513
- Added to NRHP: January 3, 1986

The Woodland Farm–Leland House is a historic house in Sherborn, Massachusetts. The oldest portion of this house, a three-bay section with chimney, was built c. 1705 by Hopestill Leland, and enlarged by the addition of a leanto to the rear c. 1715. About 1760 it was widened to a full five bay width, and ells were added to either side c. 1820 and 1950. The exterior exhibits a variety of styles, with Federal and Italianate elements. The house's original clapboards have been shingled over.

The house was listed on the National Register of Historic Places in 1986.

== See also ==
- National Register of Historic Places listings in Sherborn, Massachusetts
