= Edward's Plain–Dowse's Corner Historic District =

Historic district in Massachusetts, United States

- U.S. National Register of Historic Places
- U.S. Historic district
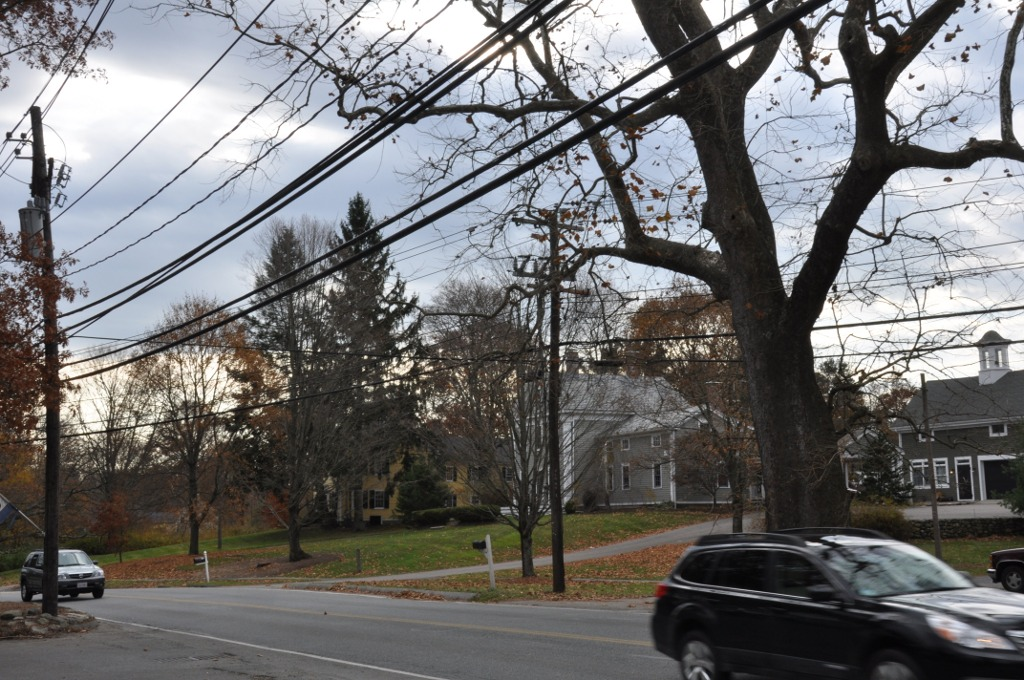
- North Main Street near Dowse's Farm Stand

- Location within Massachusetts Location within the United States
- Location: Sherborn, Massachusetts
- Coordinates: 42°15′11″N 71°22′6″W
- Area: 87 acres (35 ha)
- Architect: Multiple
- Architectural style: Greek Revival, Georgian, Federal
- MPS: Sherborn MRA
- NRHP reference No.: 86000492
- Added to NRHP: January 3, 1986

The Edward's Plain–Dowse's Corner Historic District is a predominantly residential historic district encompassing an area where light industrial activity took place from the late 18th century to the early 20th century. It extends along North Main Street between Eliot and Everett Streets in Sherborn, Massachusetts, and was listed on the National Register of Historic Places in 1986.

Sherborn was a sparsely populated town until the time of the American Revolutionary War. The Edward's Plain area, in the south of the district, was probably named for Edward West, who was appointed the local schoolmaster in 1694. Dowse's Corner, at the north end of the district, is named for Ebenezer Dowse, who settled in Sherborn after fleeing Charlestown before the 1775 Battle of Bunker Hill. Dowse became a significant figure in the local industrial pursuits, establishing an early tannery in the buggy lowlands behind his house. Members of the Dowse family built a number of the houses in the area, predominantly Greek Revival houses built c. 1840-60. Dowse's efforts were the beginning of a cottage industry in shoe-making which persisted into the early 20th century. Most of the buildings associated with this and other small industry have either been lost to fire, been converted to residential uses, or moved out of the area.

One of the more notable industrial buildings to survive is the only stone building in the district. Nathaniel Partridge in 1796 built a stone structure to house a factory for manufacturing edged tools, which still stands at 53-55 North Main Street, adjacent to the Federal-style Harvey Partridge House at 51 North Main. The Plain School (built 1834) at 60 North Street, is the only building in the district that is not now residential in use.

== See also ==
- National Register of Historic Places listings in Sherborn, Massachusetts
