= Ware's Tavern =

Historic tavern in Massachusetts, United States

- U.S. National Register of Historic Places
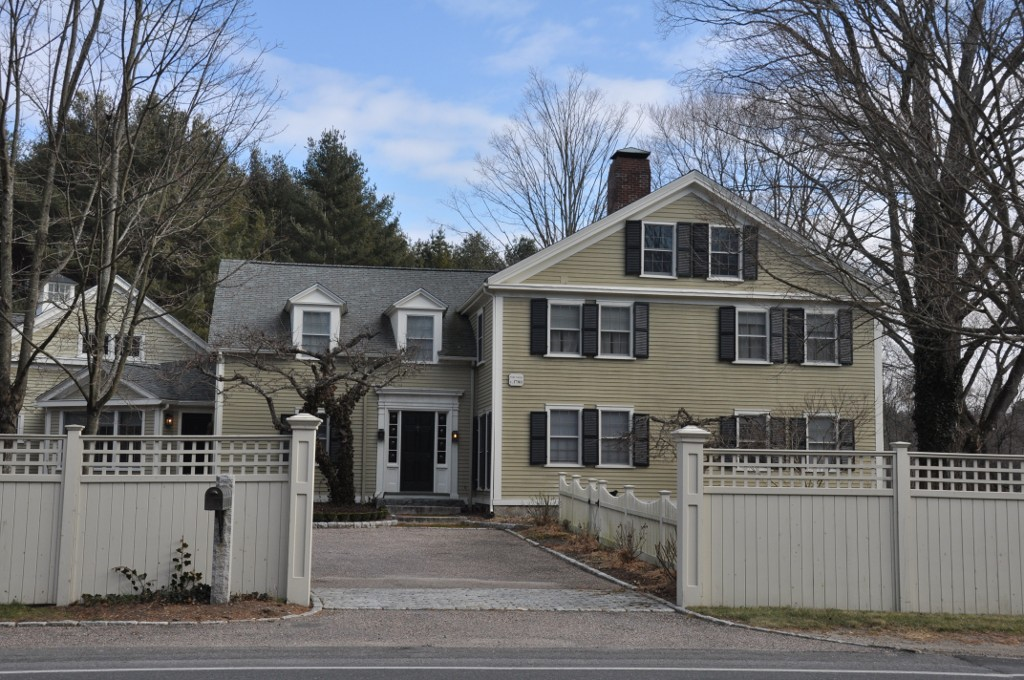

- Location within Massachusetts Location within the United States
- Location: 113 S. Main Street, Sherborn, Massachusetts
- Coordinates: 42°13′39″N 71°21′58″W
- Built: 1780
- Architectural style: Greek Revival, Federal
- MPS: Sherborn MRA
- NRHP reference No.: 86000512
- Added to NRHP: January 3, 1986

Ware's Tavern is a historic tavern (now a private residence) in Sherborn, Massachusetts. The two story wood-frame structure was built c. 1780 by Benjamin Ware as a house for his family. It has a centered entry that is now sheltered by a Colonial Revival (early 20th century) surround. Ware's son Eleazer converted the building into a tavern; it was greatly enlarged with an ell to the rear c. 1840. The building ceased to be used as a tavern by 1889; an ell was removed sometime in the 19th century, and now stands at 109 S. Main Street.

The tavern was listed on the National Register of Historic Places in 1986.

== See also ==
- National Register of Historic Places listings in Sherborn, Massachusetts
