= Morse–Tay–Leland–Hawes House =

Historic house in Massachusetts, United States

- U.S. National Register of Historic Places
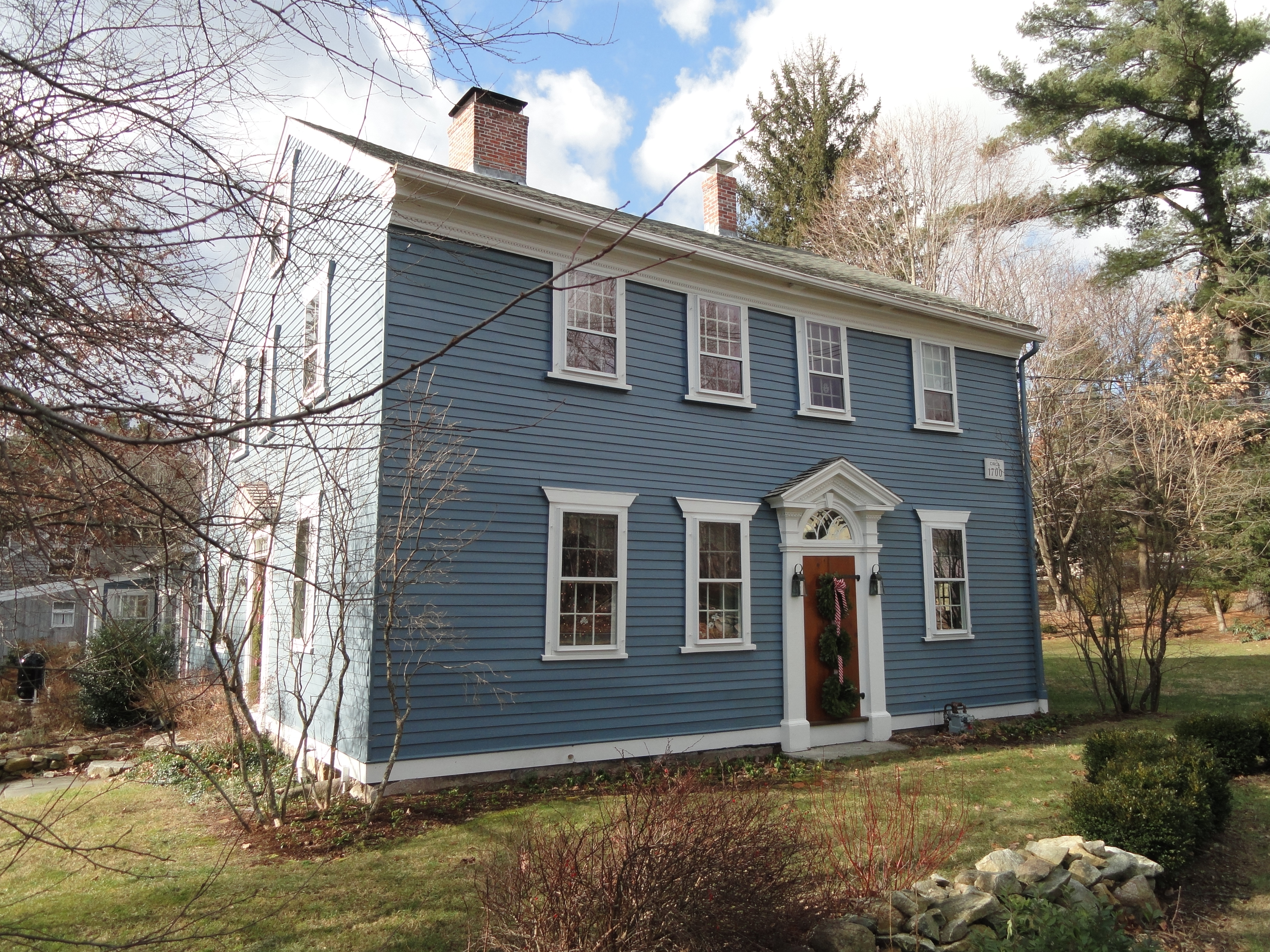

- Location within Massachusetts Location within the United States
- Location: 266 Western Avenue, Sherborn, Massachusetts
- Coordinates: 42°13′24″N 71°24′3″W
- Built: 1700
- Architectural style: Georgian
- MPS: Sherborn MRA
- NRHP reference No.: 86000506
- Added to NRHP: January 3, 1986

The Morse–Tay–Leland–Hawes House is a historic house in Sherborn, Massachusetts.

The farmhouse was built about 1700 by James Morse (born 1686), and added to the National Register of Historic Places in 1986. It consists of a 2 1/2-story main house in 4 bays, with single story rear wing. Surface treatments are late Georgian in style, probably added by Dr. Jonathan Tay in the 1770s or 1780s, and include a semicircular fanlight and narrow Doric pilasters framing the front door.

== See also ==
- National Register of Historic Places listings in Sherborn, Massachusetts
