= Deacon William Leland House =

Historic house in Massachusetts, United States

- U.S. National Register of Historic Places
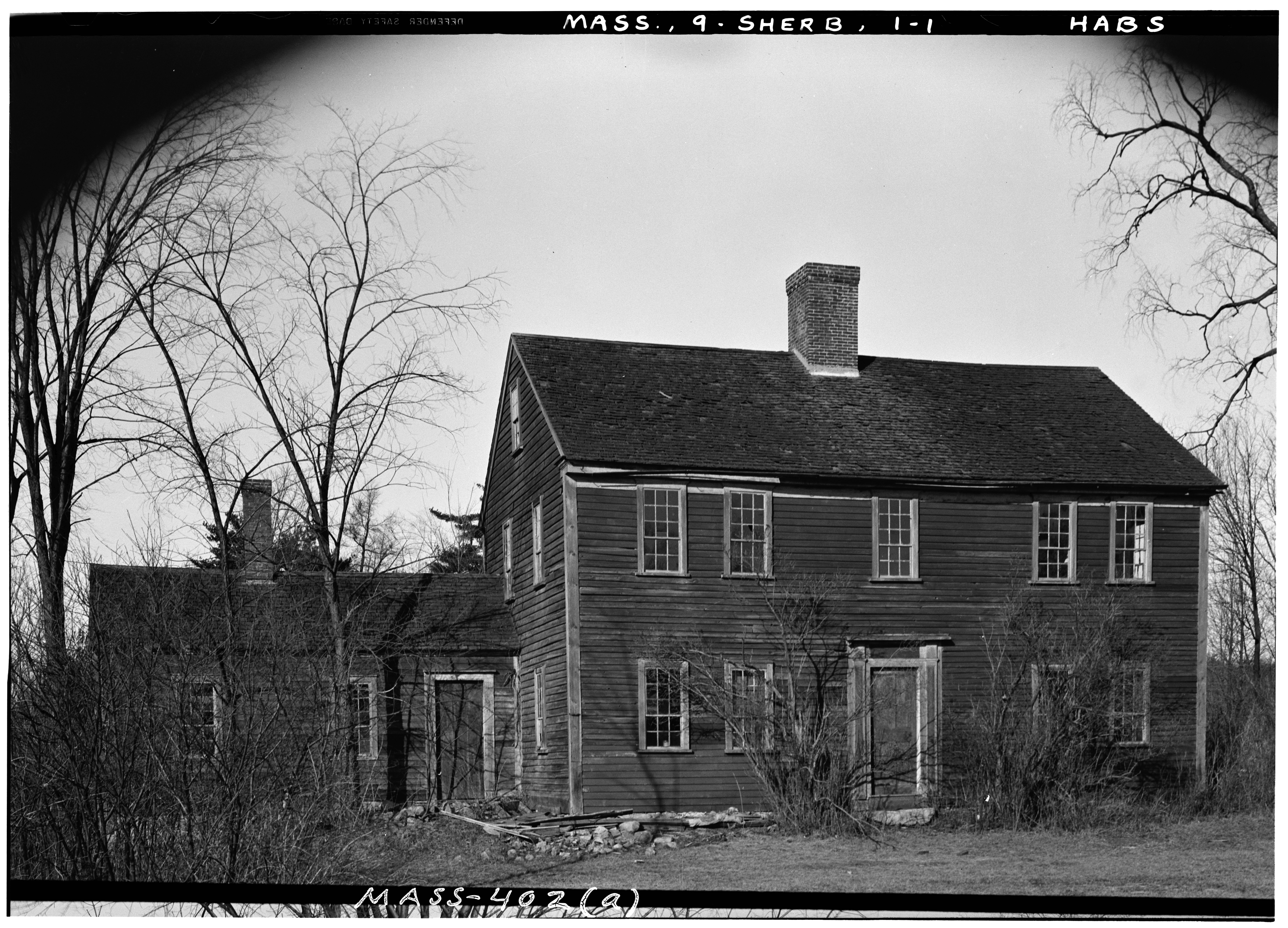
- Deacon William Leland House as of Feb. 24, 1941.

- Location within Massachusetts Location within the United States
- Location: 27 Hollis Street, Sherborn, Massachusetts
- Coordinates: 42°12′29″N 71°23′5″W
- Built: 1717
- Architectural style: Georgian
- MPS: Sherborn MRA
- NRHP reference No.: 86000503
- Added to NRHP: January 3, 1986

The Deacon William Leland House is a historic house in Sherborn, Massachusetts. It is a 2 1/2-story main dwelling, five bays wide, with a small ell to the west. It has a side gable roof with central chimney, and relatively simple trim. The house was built in 1717 for Deacon William Leland, son of one of the area's first settlers, and has seen relatively little exterior alteration, unlike other early houses in the town.

The house was listed on the National Register of Historic Places in 1986.

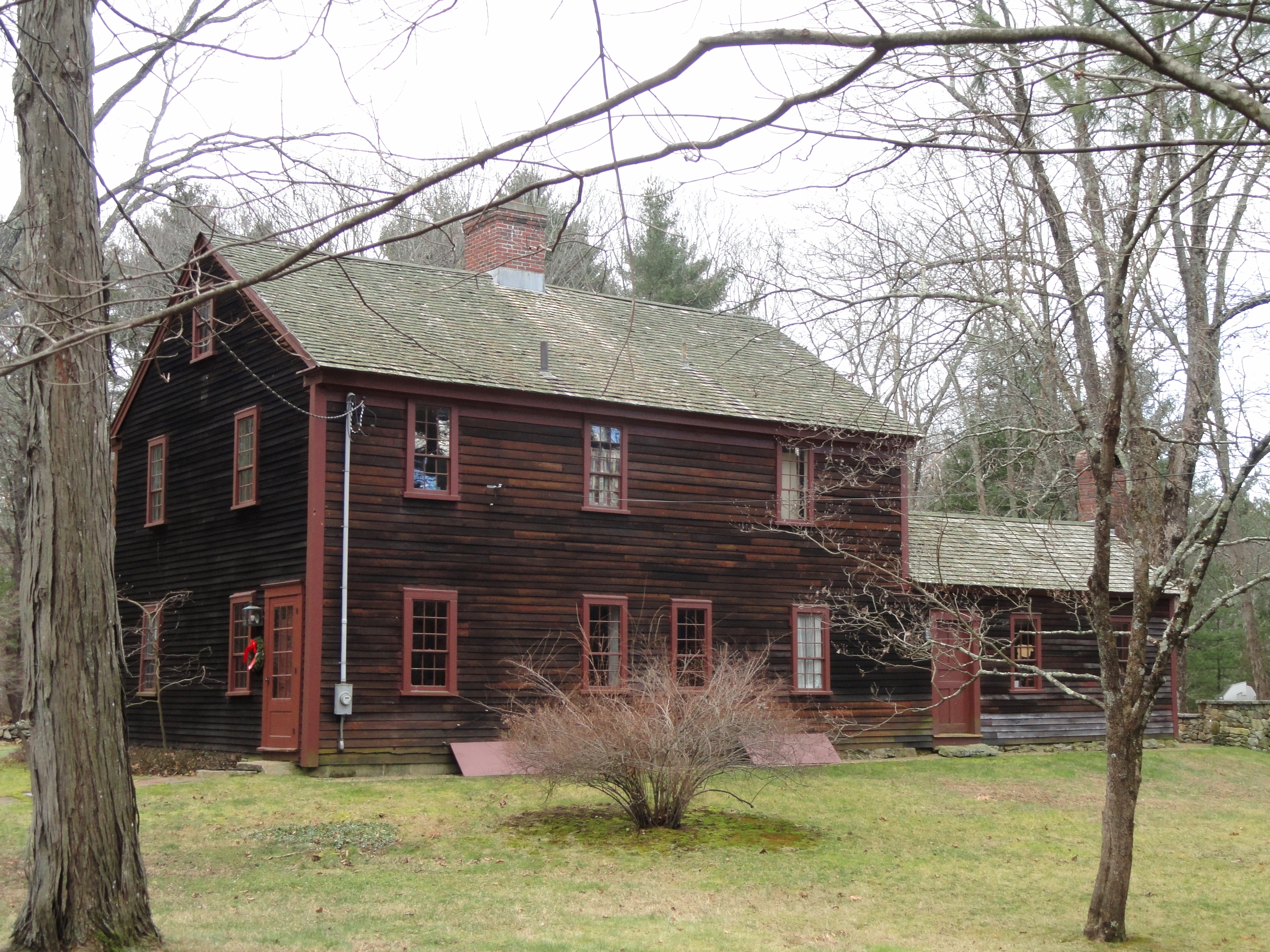
View of the rear of the house

== See also ==
- National Register of Historic Places listings in Sherborn, Massachusetts
