= National Register of Historic Places listings in Sherborn, Massachusetts =

This is a list of properties and historic districts listed on the National Register of Historic Places in Sherborn, Massachusetts, United States. There are 24 listings in all, and one former listing.

The locations of National Register properties and districts (at least for all showing latitude and longitude coordinates below) may be seen in an online map.

This National Park Service list is complete through NPS recent listings posted May 1, 2026.

== Current listings ==
	Name on the Register	Image	Date listed	Location	City or town	Description
1	Assington	Assington	January 3, 1986 (#86000490)	172 Forest St. 42°13′41″N 71°20′30″W		
2	Bullen–Stratton–Cozzen House	Bullen–Stratton–Cozzen House	January 3, 1986 (#86000496)	52 Brush Hill Rd. 42°15′15″N 71°24′06″W		
3	Clark–Northrup House	Clark–Northrup House	January 3, 1986 (#86000497)	93 Maple St. 42°14′19″N 71°23′14″W		
4	Joseph Cleale House	Joseph Cleale House	January 3, 1986 (#86000498)	147 Western Ave. 42°14′21″N 71°24′23″W		
5	Rev. Edmund Dowse House	Rev. Edmund Dowse House	January 3, 1986 (#86000499)	25 Farm Rd. 42°14′19″N 71°21′55″W		
6	Edward's Plain–Dowse's Corner Historic District	Edward's Plain–Dowse's Corner Historic District	January 3, 1986 (#86000492)	N. Main St. between Eliot and Everett Sts. 42°15′11″N 71°22′06″W		
7	Thomas Fleming House	Thomas Fleming House	January 3, 1986 (#86000500)	18 Maple St. 42°14′28″N 71°22′29″W		
8	Addington Gardner House	Addington Gardner House	March 9, 1990 (#90000179)	128 Hollis St. 42°12′58″N 71°23′55″W		
9	Eleazer Goulding House	Eleazer Goulding House	January 3, 1986 (#86000501)	137 Western Ave. 42°14′27″N 71°24′24″W		
10	Charles Holbrook House	Charles Holbrook House	January 3, 1986 (#86000502)	137 S. Main St. 42°13′31″N 71°21′47″W		
11	Deacon William Leland House	Deacon William Leland House	January 3, 1986 (#86000503)	27 Hollis St. 42°12′29″N 71°23′05″W		
12	Charles D. Lewis House	Charles D. Lewis House	January 3, 1986 (#86000504)	81 Hunting Ln. 42°14′58″N 71°23′00″W		
13	Daniel Morse III House	Daniel Morse III House	January 3, 1986 (#86000505)	210 Farm Rd. 42°14′05″N 71°20′13″W		
14	Morse–Barber House	Morse–Barber House	January 3, 1986 (#86000493)	46 Forest St. 42°13′14″N 71°21′23″W		
15	Morse–Tay–Leland–Hawes House	Morse–Tay–Leland–Hawes House	January 3, 1986 (#86000506)	266 Western Ave. 42°13′24″N 71°24′03″W		
16	Asa Sanger House	Asa Sanger House	January 3, 1986 (#86000507)	70 Washington St. 42°14′08″N 71°22′52″W		
17	Richard Sanger III House	Richard Sanger III House	January 3, 1986 (#86000508)	60 Washington St. 42°14′09″N 71°22′48″W		
18	Sawin–Bullen–Bullard House	Sawin–Bullen–Bullard House	January 3, 1986 (#86000509)	60 Brush Hill Rd. 42°15′27″N 71°24′15″W		
19	Sherborn Center Historic District	Sherborn Center Historic District	January 3, 1986 (#86000495)	Roughly bounded by Zion's Ln., Conrail railroad tracks, Farm and Sawin Sts., and Washington and N. Main Sts. 42°14′30″N 71°22′16″W		
20	Sudbury Aqueduct Linear District	Sudbury Aqueduct Linear District	January 18, 1990 (#89002293)	Along Sudbury Aqueduct from Farm Pond at Waverly St. (Framingham) to Chestnut Hill Reservoir (Newton); 42°16′09″N 71°22′56″W		Extends from Framingham to Newton.
21	Joseph Twitchell House	Joseph Twitchell House	January 3, 1986 (#86000510)	32 Pleasant St. 42°13′55″N 71°24′06″W		
22	H. G. Vaughn House	H. G. Vaughn House	January 3, 1986 (#86000511)	5 Sparhawk Rd. 42°12′24″N 71°22′09″W		
23	Ware's Tavern	Ware's Tavern	January 3, 1986 (#86000512)	113 S. Main St. 42°13′39″N 71°21′58″W		
24	Woodland Farm–Leland House	Woodland Farm–Leland House	January 3, 1986 (#86000513)	104 Woodland St. 42°13′19″N 71°22′54″W		

== Former listings ==
	Name on the Register	Image	Date listed	Date removed	Location	City or town	Description
1	Sewall–Ware House		January 3, 1986 (#86000494)	February 12, 2025	100 S. Main St. 42°13′43″N 71°22′02″W		Demolished.
