= Bullen–Stratton–Cozzen House =

Historic house in Massachusetts, United States

- U.S. National Register of Historic Places
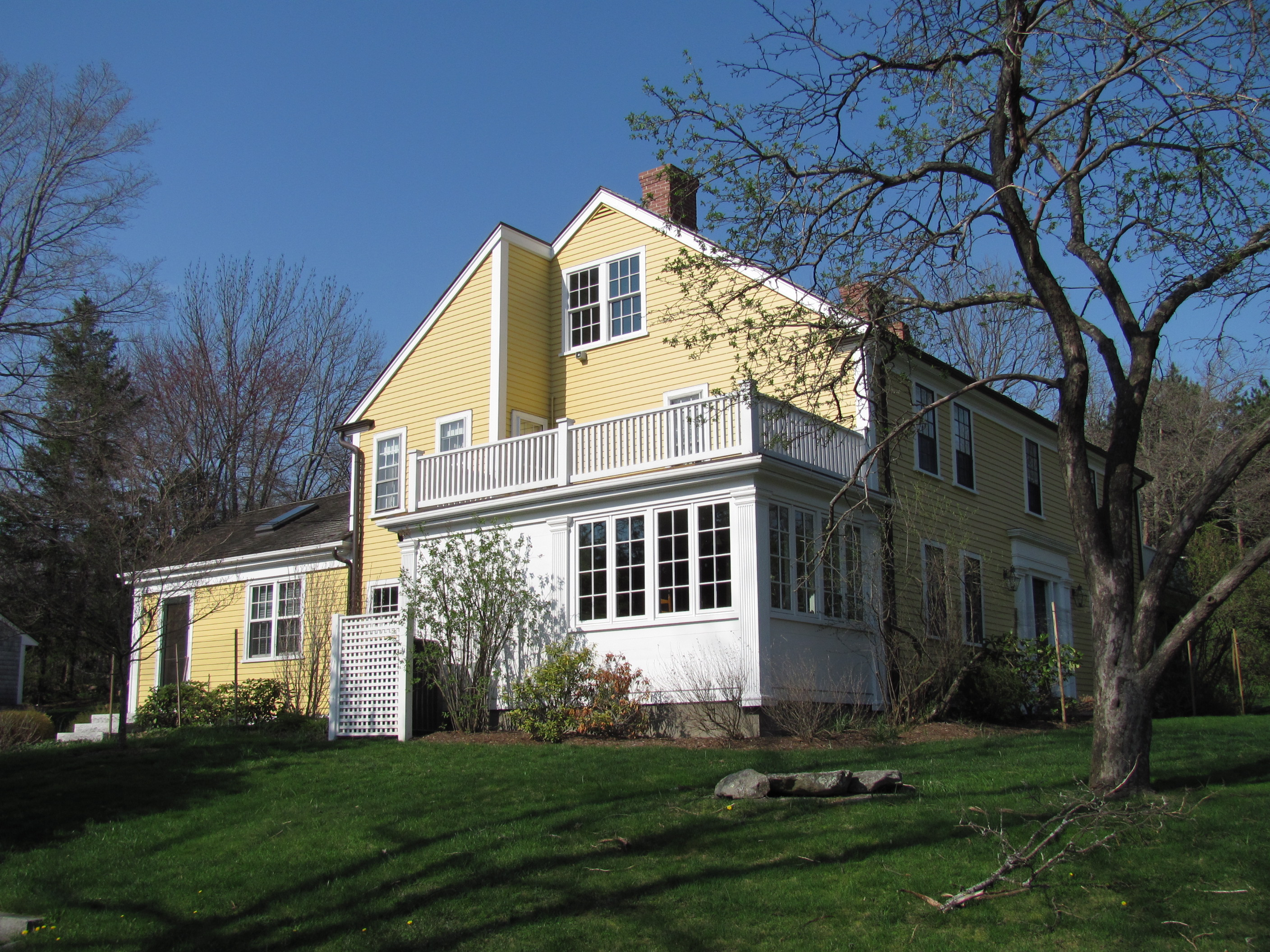
- Bullen–Stratton–Cozzen House

- Location within Massachusetts Location within the United States
- Location: 52 Brush Hill Road, Sherborn, Massachusetts
- Coordinates: 42°15′15″N 71°24′6″W
- Built: c. 1680 (NRHP)
- Architectural style: Georgian
- MPS: Sherborn MRA
- NRHP reference No.: 86000496
- Added to NRHP: January 3, 1986

The Bullen–Stratton–Cozzen House is a historic First Period house in Sherborn, Massachusetts. Its oldest portion is estimated to date to about 1680, and the building reflects changes in taste and use over the intervening centuries. The house was listed on the National Register of Historic Places in 1986.

== Description and history ==
The Bullen–Stratton–Cozzen House is located on the north side of Brush Hill Road, a rural country road in northwestern Sherborn. It is set in bend in the road, and is set facing roughly south, not far from Course Brook, a typical First Period siting. The main block of the house is a 2 1/2-story wood-frame structure, five bays wide, with a side-gable roof, twin interior chimneys and clapboard siding. A leanto section, apparently integral to its early construction, extends to the rear, with a later "Beverly jog" extending the leanto beyond the left side. The central entrance has a Greek Revival surround, that dates to c. 1840. It has narrow sidelights and pilasters with a distinctive Greek key motif that is unusual in the town.

The oldest portion of this house was probably built c. 1680 by Deacon Samuel Bullen, and early settler of the area. The main block was extended to its present size c. 1760 by Nathaniel Stratton, who married into the Bullen family, and was probably also responsible for the added Beverly jog. In the 19th century the house belonged to Isaac Cozzen, who operated a sawmill nearby. The house's Colonial Revival porches were added around 1910, when the property was being used as a vacation house.

== See also ==
- National Register of Historic Places listings in Sherborn, Massachusetts
