= Sewall–Ware House =

Historic house in Massachusetts, United States

- Formerly listed on the U.S. National Register of Historic Places
- Photo c. 1986

- Location within Massachusetts Location within the United States
- Location: Sherborn, Massachusetts
- Coordinates: 42°13′43″N 71°22′2″W
- MPS: Sherborn MRA
- NRHP reference No.: 86000494

Significant dates
- Added to NRHP: January 3, 1986
- Removed from NRHP: February 12, 2025

The Sewall–Ware House was a historic house at 100 S. Main Street in Sherborn, Massachusetts. The house stood on land once belonging to Massachusetts judge Samuel Sewall (best known for his participation in the Salem witch trials). The house may have been constructed by Sewall's instructions for a tenant farmer. In the mid-18th century it was the boyhood home of Harvard College divinity professor Henry Ware, and remained in the Ware family well into the 19th century.

It was added to the National Register of Historic Places in 1986, and was delisted in 2025 because it was relocated without following the procedures required for a property to keep its designation following a move.

== See also ==
- National Register of Historic Places listings in Sherborn, Massachusetts
