= Northrup House =

Northrup House may refer to:

== Buildings ==
United States

- Northrup House (Iola, Kansas)
- Palmer-Northrup House, North Kingstown, Rhode Island
- Clark-Northrup House, Sherborn, Massachusetts
- Northrup-Gilbert House, Phoenix, New York

== See also ==
- Stephen Northup House, listed on the NRHP in North Kingstown, Rhode Island
