= Daniel Morse III House =

Historic house in Massachusetts, United States

- U.S. National Register of Historic Places
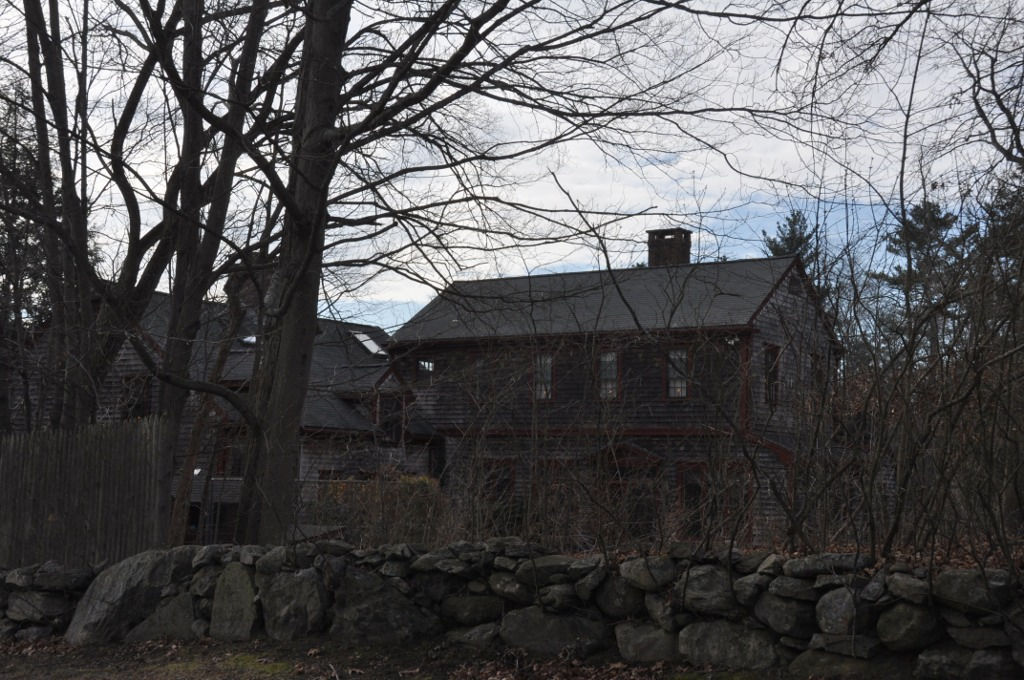

- Location within Massachusetts Location within the United States
- Location: 210 Farm Rd., Sherborn, Massachusetts
- Coordinates: 42°14′5″N 71°20′13″W
- Area: less than one acre
- Built: 1710
- MPS: Sherborn MRA
- NRHP reference No.: 86000505
- Added to NRHP: January 3, 1986

The Daniel Morse III House is a historic First Period house at 210 Farm Road in Sherborn, Massachusetts. With its oldest portion dating to about 1710, it is one of the town's oldest surviving buildings. It was listed on the National Register of Historic Places in 1986.

== Description and history ==
The Daniel Morse III House stands in a rural area of eastern Sherborn, on the west side of Farm Road north of its junction with Forest Road. It is a 2 1/2-story timber-frame structure, with a gabled roof, central chimney, and shingled exterior. At the rear the roof extends to the first floor, giving the house a saltbox profile. The front facade is three bays wide, with a center entrance flanked by pilasters and topped by a transom window and gabled pediment. An ell extends to the rear of the main block. Other buildings on the property include a barn and chicken coop.

The oldest portion of this house was built c. 1710, and is one of a handful of First Period houses in the town. Originally a three-bay structure with off-center chimney, it was extended to its present five-bay configuration with central chimney in the late 18th century. Daniel Morse III, who built the house, was the son of one of Sherborn's first settlers, who acquired 800 acres (320 ha) of surrounding land in 1656. The house was sold out of the Morse family in the late 18th century. The barn, south of the house, was built in 1900 in the Shingle style.

== See also ==
- National Register of Historic Places listings in Sherborn, Massachusetts
