= Joseph Twitchell House =

Historic house in Massachusetts, United States

- U.S. National Register of Historic Places
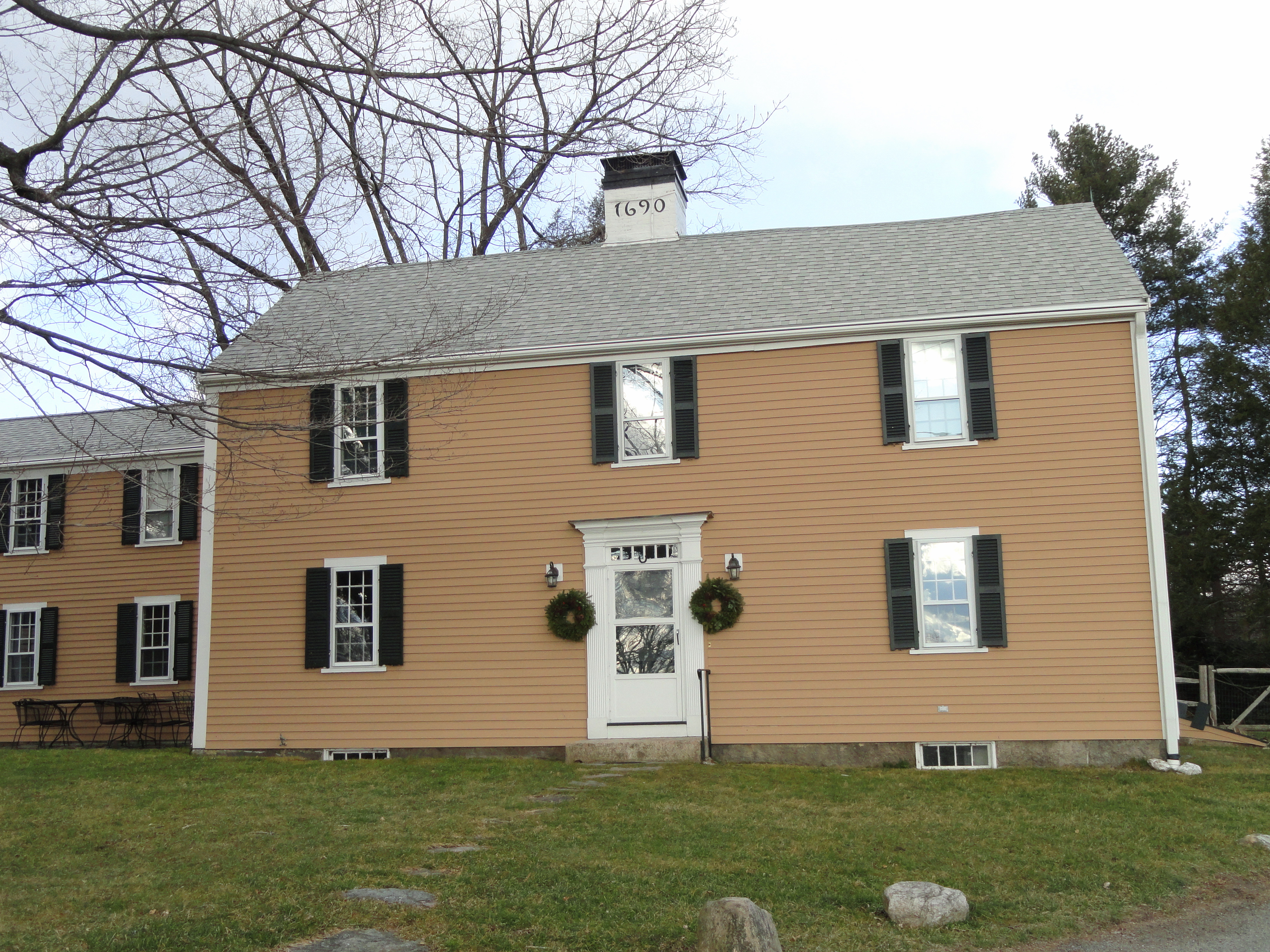

- Location within Massachusetts Location within the United States
- Location: 32 Pleasant St., Sherborn, Massachusetts
- Coordinates: 42°13′55″N 71°24′6″W
- Built: 1710
- MPS: Sherborn MRA
- NRHP reference No.: 86000510
- Added to NRHP: January 3, 1986

The Joseph Twitchell House is a historic house in Sherborn, Massachusetts. It was built circa 1710, or possibly 1690, with a north wing dating from the early 1800s. It is one of a small number of houses in Sherborn that have elements that may date to the 17th century. It is a 2 1/2-story wood-frame saltbox house, 3 wide bays, with a massive central chimney, side-gable roof, and clapboard siding. Inside it is laid out as a central hall, one room on either side, and lean-to at the rear. The Georgian front door is flanked by Doric pilasters and topped by a multi-pane transom and entablature.

The house was listed on the National Register of Historic Places in 1986.

== See also ==
- National Register of Historic Places listings in Sherborn, Massachusetts
