= Broadmoor Wildlife Sanctuary =

Wildlife sanctuary in Massachusetts

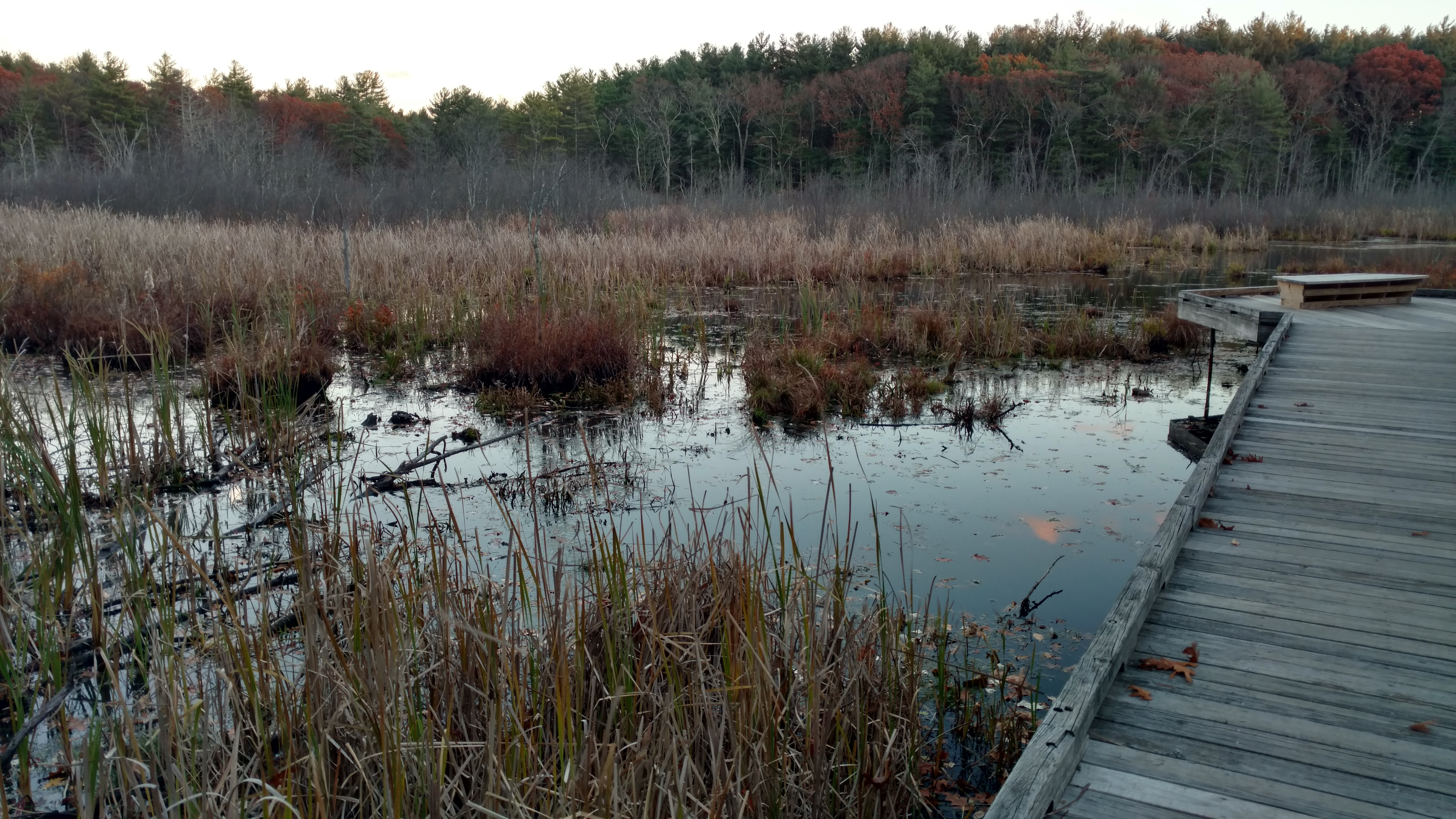

- Location within Massachusetts
- Interactive map of Broadmoor Wildlife Sanctuary
- Type: Wildlife sanctuary, nature center
- Location: 280 Eliot Street; Natick, Massachusetts, USA
- Coordinates: 42°15′22″N 71°20′25″W
- Area: 624 acres (253 ha)
- Operator: Massachusetts Audubon Society
- Hiking trails: 9 miles
- Website: Broadmoor Wildlife Sanctuary

Broadmoor Wildlife Sanctuary is a 624 acres (253 ha) wildlife sanctuary located in Natick, Massachusetts. The sanctuary was created by the Massachusetts Audubon Society after donations of land in 1962 and 1968. Bird watchers have identified more than 175 species on the property.

== History ==
Broadmoor is located on land within the territory of the Massachusett Indigenous nation. Following the arrival of Europeans in the early 17th century, the population of the Massachusett fell by as much as 90% due to epidemics. In 1651, Puritan missionary John Eliot received permission of the Massachusetts General Court to create the town of Natick as one of the Praying Towns. Only Indians who had converted to Christianity were permitted to live in the town. In the 1690s, Thomas Sawin, who lived in a house in nearby Sherborn, was invited by the Natick Indians to build a gristmill and dam on the stream that is now called Indian Brook, creating the Broadmoor Mill Pond. Sawin built a house near the mills, and became the first non-Indian resident of Natick. Around 1720, the Sawin family built a sawmill and a new gristmill.

In 1858, the Sawin family sold the mills to John Andrew Morse, and the mills became known as the Morse Mills. The mills operated into the early 20th century.

Broadmoor was created by a 1962 donation of land at Little Farm Pond by Henry S. Channing. After the Morse Mills closed, the land was sold to Carl S. Stillman, whose family donated the land to Mass Audubon in 1968. Foundations of the mills and several old millstones are visible on the property.

During the 19th century, beavers were eliminated from Massachusetts. But state wildlife officials began reintroducing beavers in the 1980s, and a beaver colony was established in Broadmoor's Indian Brook Swamp in 1989.

== Land and trails ==
Broadmoor's 9 miles of trail pass through woodlands, marshland, ponds, and a glacial drumlin, and along the banks of the Charles River. The sanctuary's wetlands feature wood ducks, painted turtles, great blue herons, and river otters.

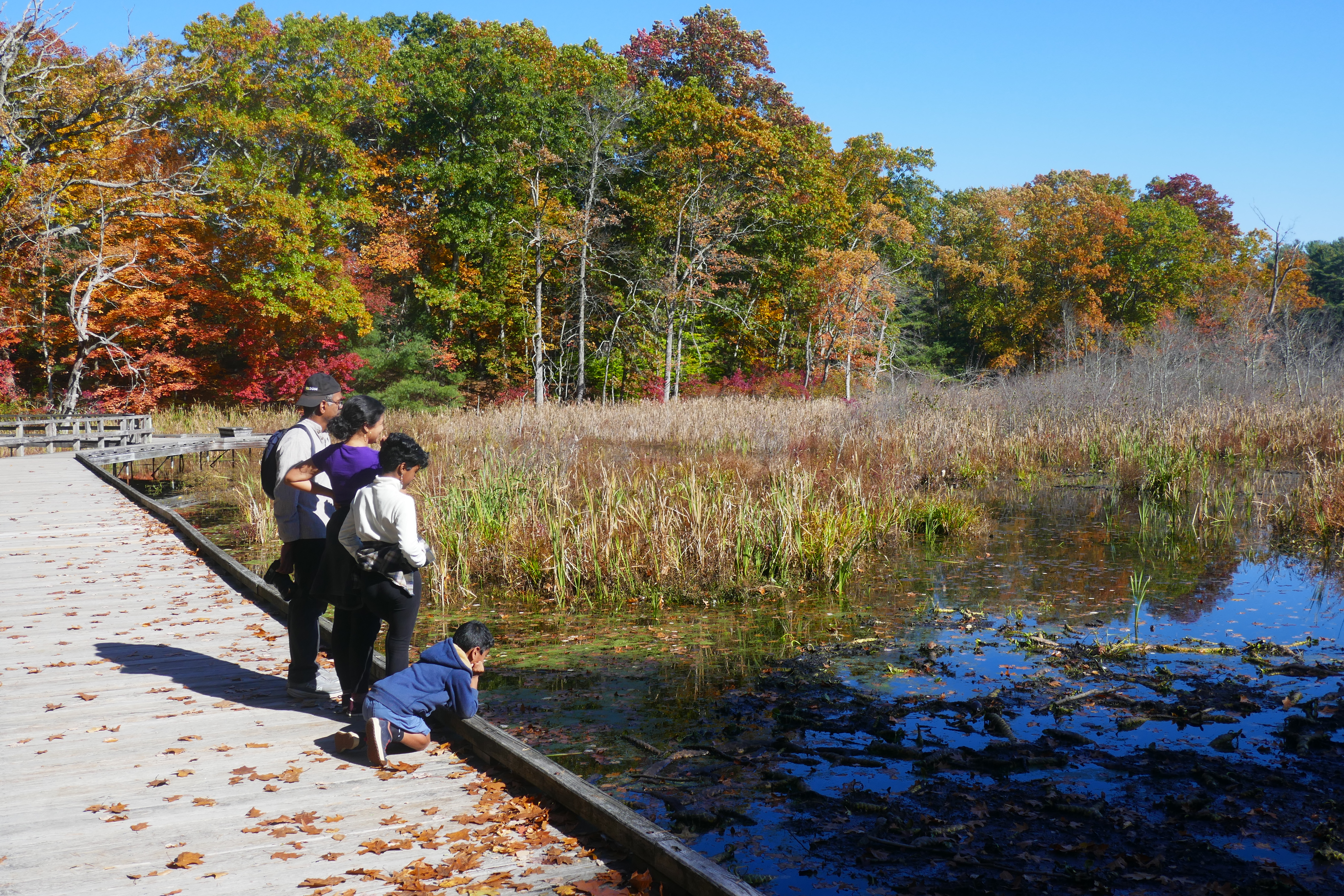
All Persons Trail

In 2021, Prevention Magazine listed Broadmoor's All Persons Trail as one of the "50 Best Walks in America."

The All Persons Trail as well as the Indian Brook Trail and the Marsh Trail are featured in the Appalachian Mountain Club's Massachusetts Trail Guide.

A 3-mile loop on the Indian Brook Trail and the Glacial Hill Trail is described in the AMC's Best Day Hikes Near Boston.

South Street divides the bulk of the sanctuary from a tract along the Charles River. The Charles River Trail is a 1-mile loop that starts at South Street and follows the riverbank. Great horned owls and Pileated woodpeckers have been spotted along the trail.

== Nature center and programs ==
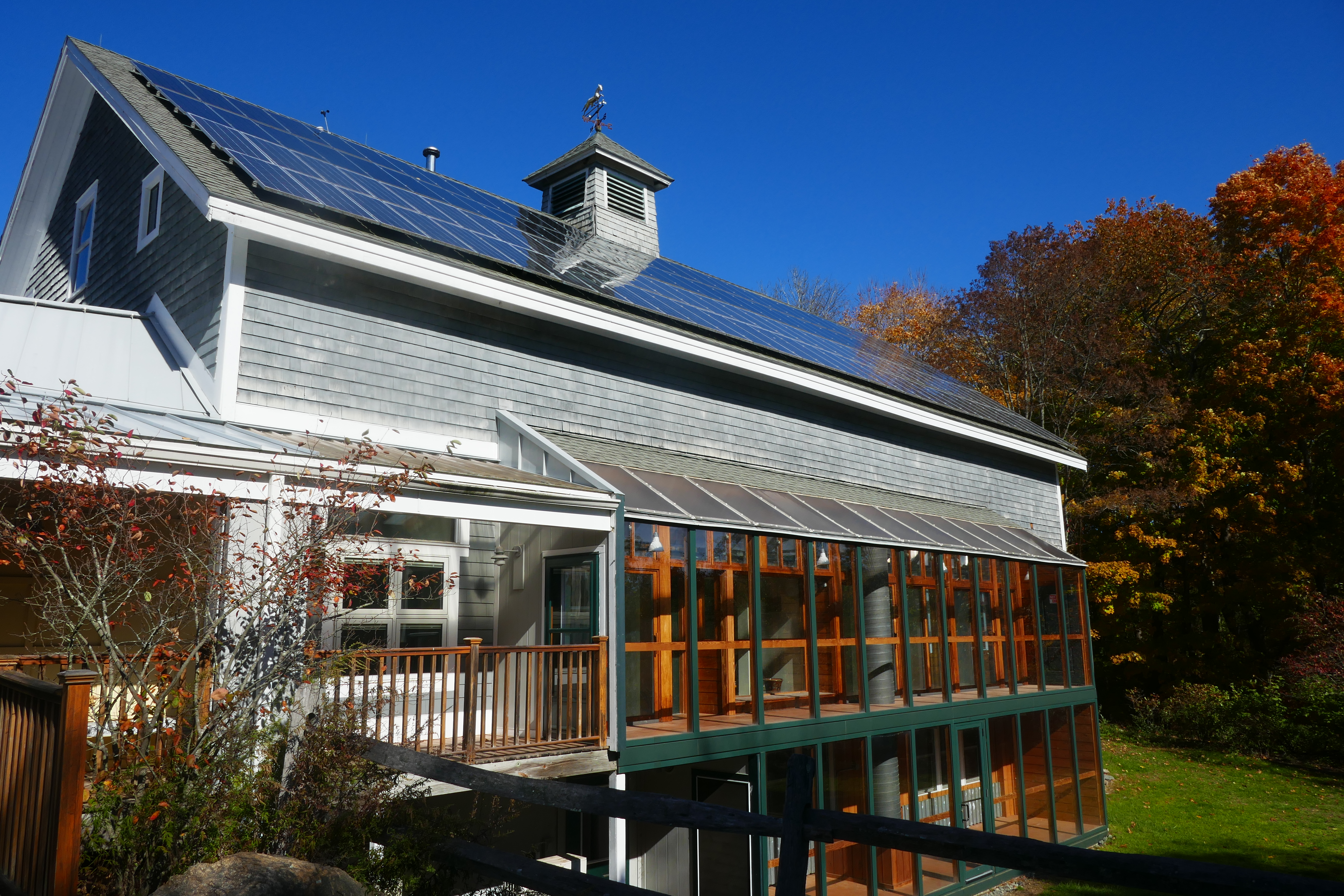

The Broadmoor nature center is a 1911 horse barn that was renovated in 1983 and 2013. Environmental improvements included adding solar collectors on the roof, composting toilets, and rainwater storage. The nature center includes a small shop and a room used for programs and exhibits.

Broadmoor programs include bird-watching, lectures, canoe trips, hiking, and a children's summer camp.

== Gallery ==
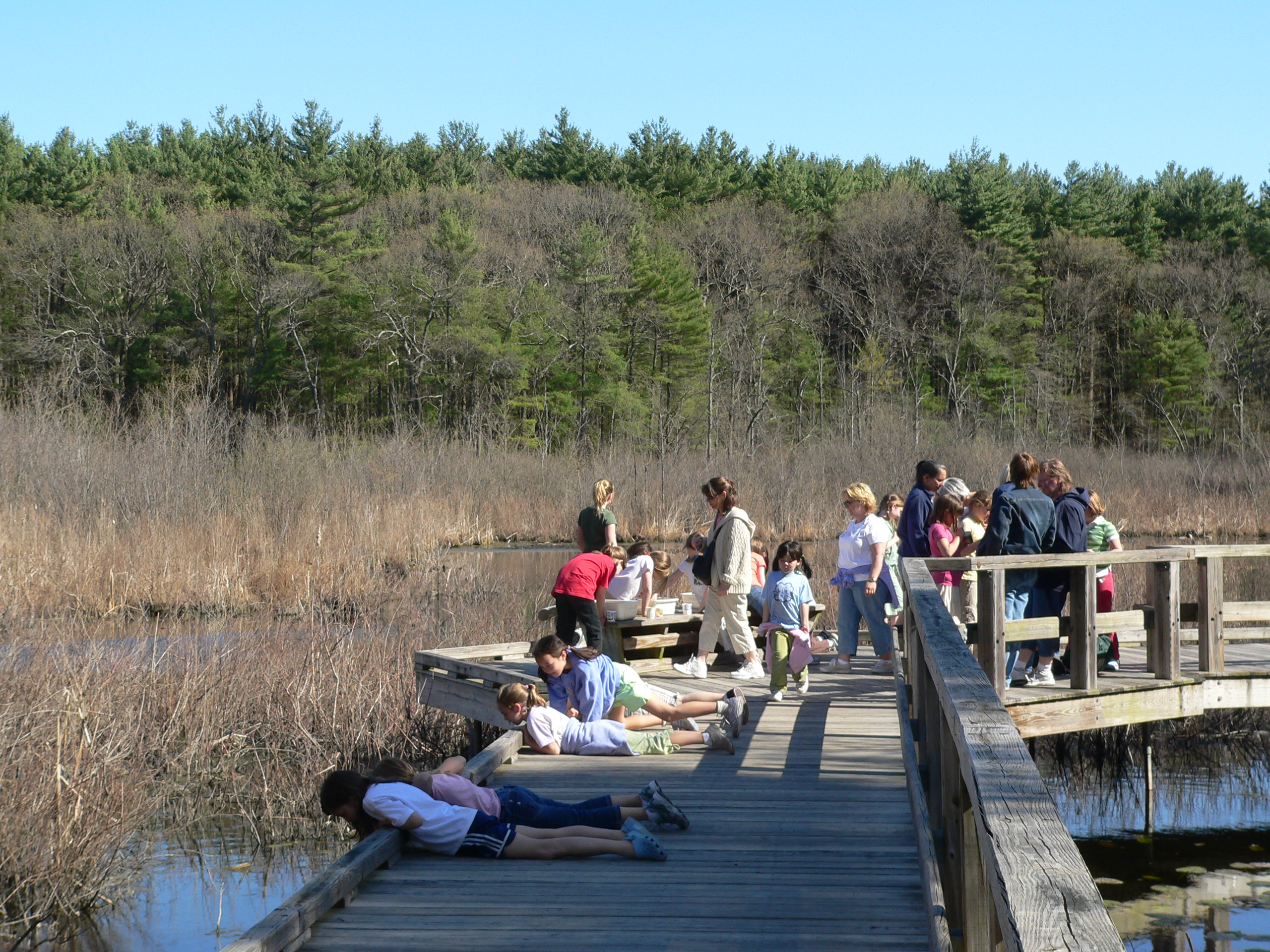
"All Persons Trail" next to the marsh

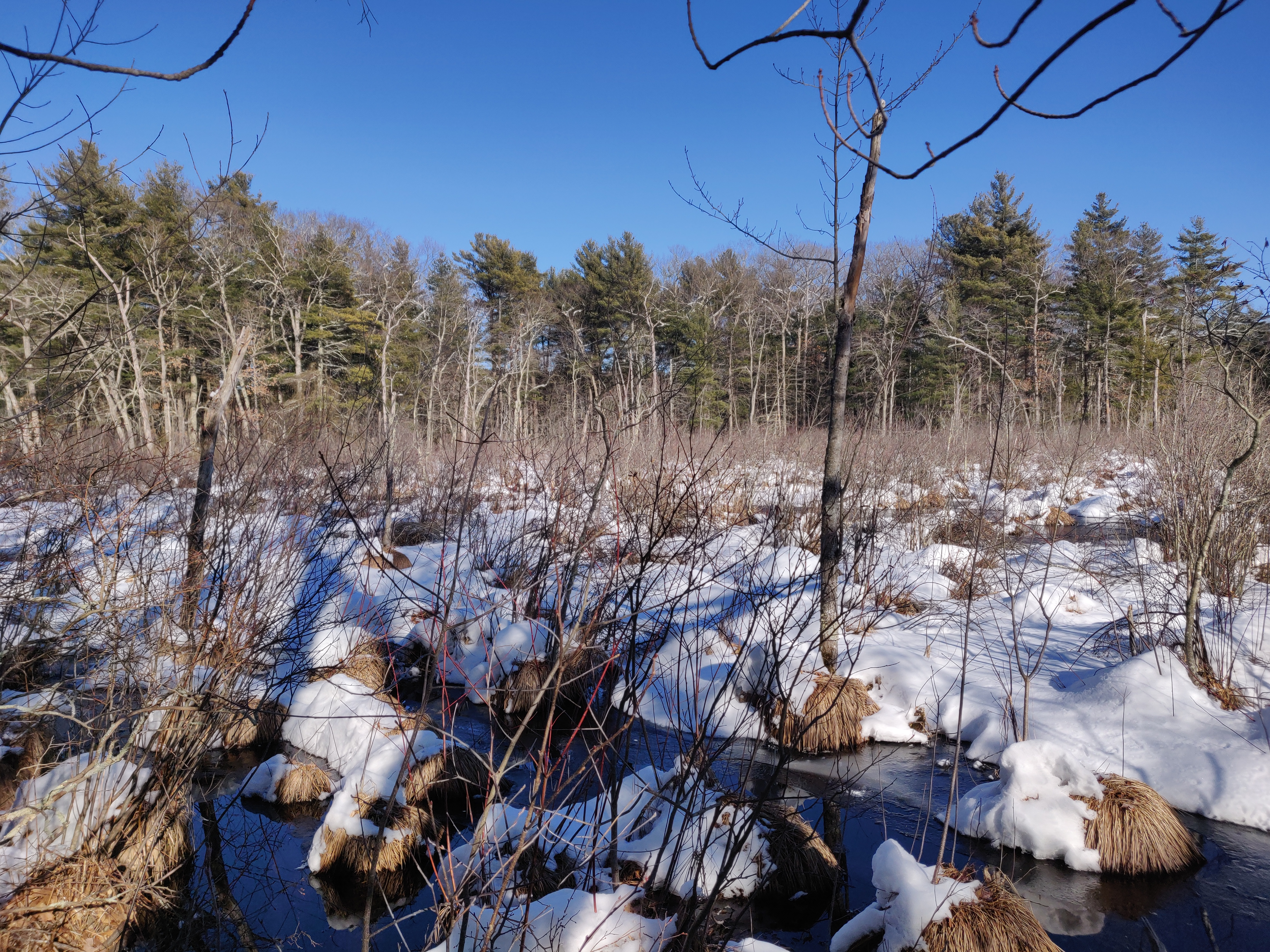

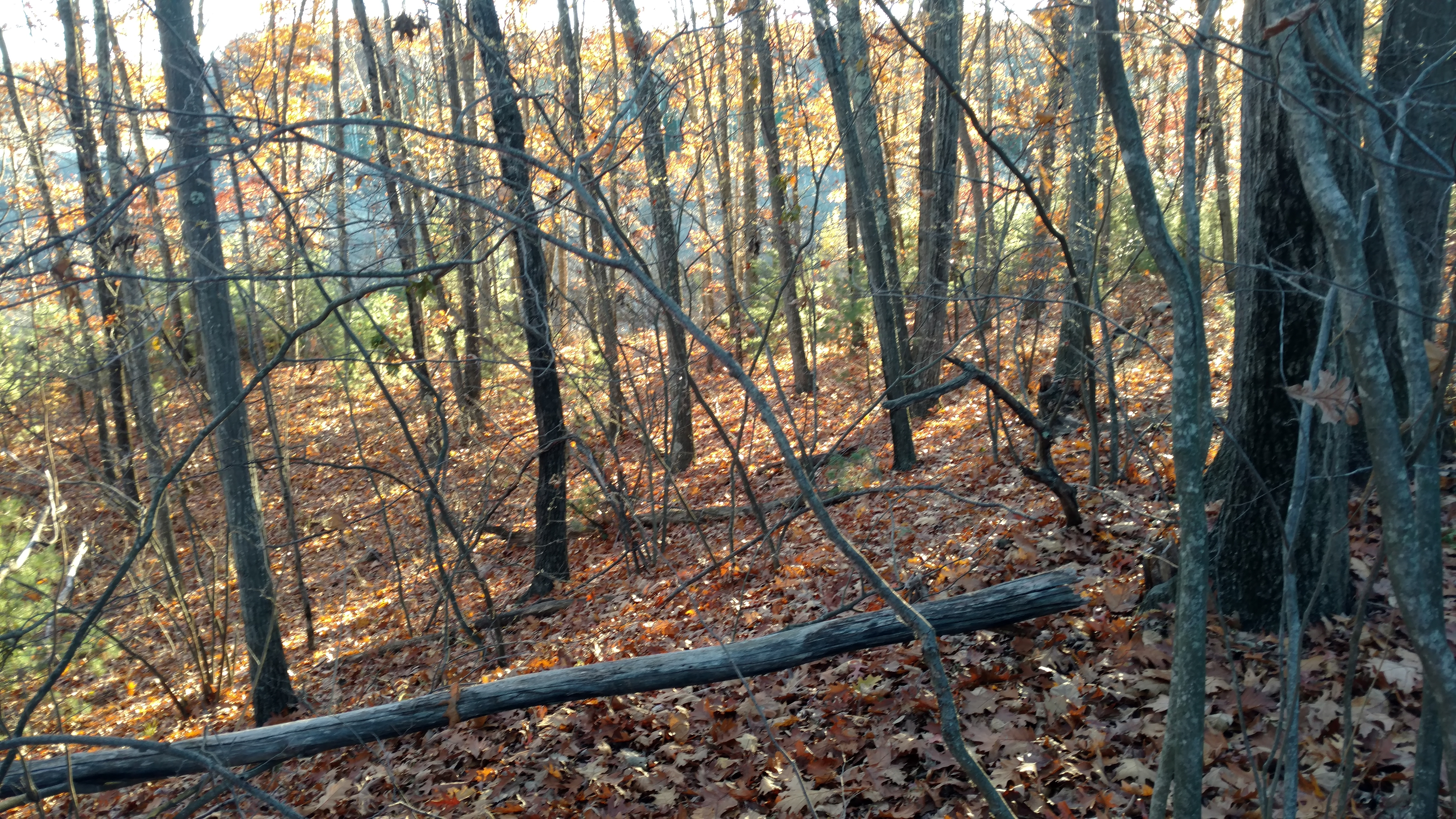

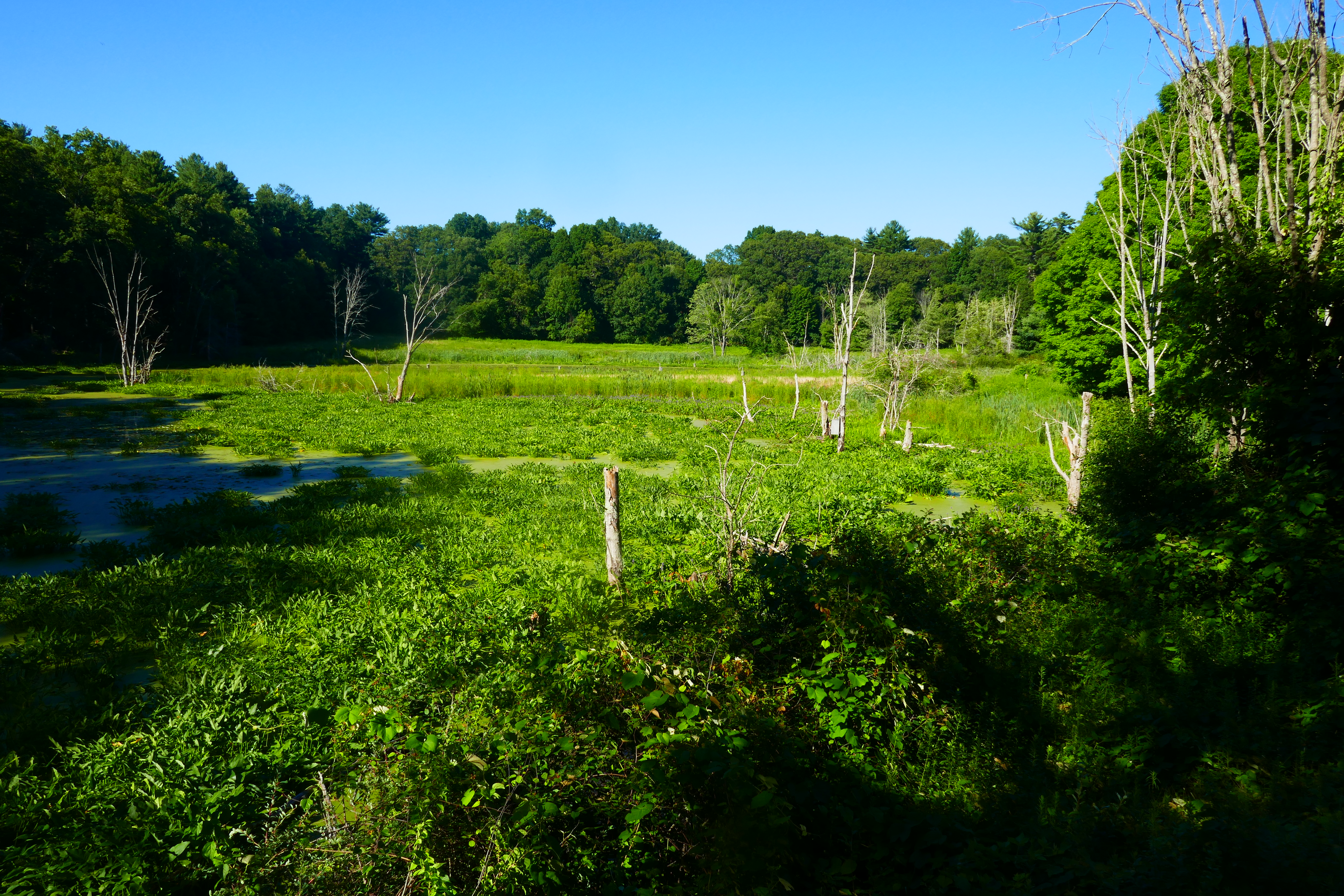

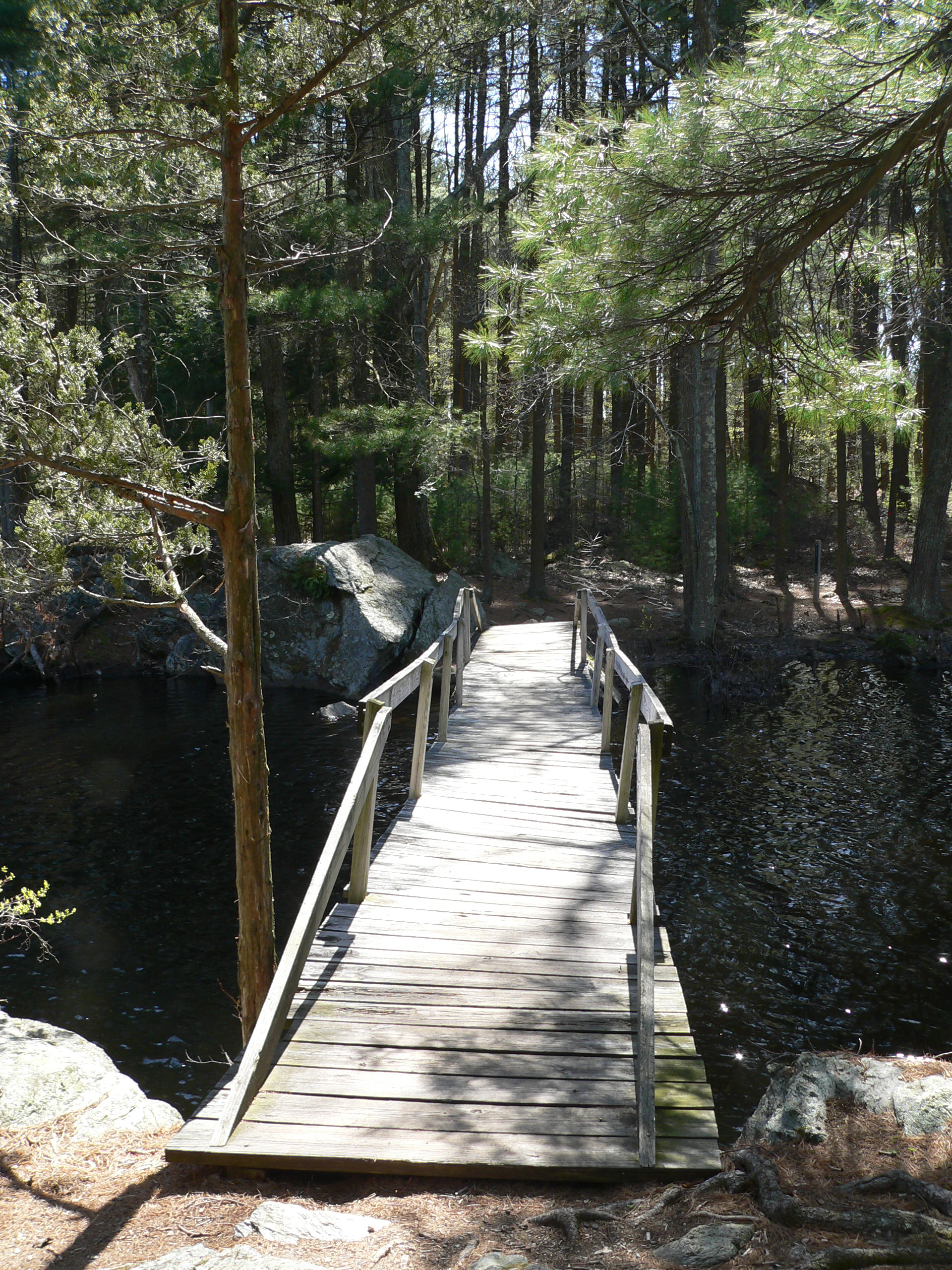
Bridge over Mill Pond was removed early in the 21st century

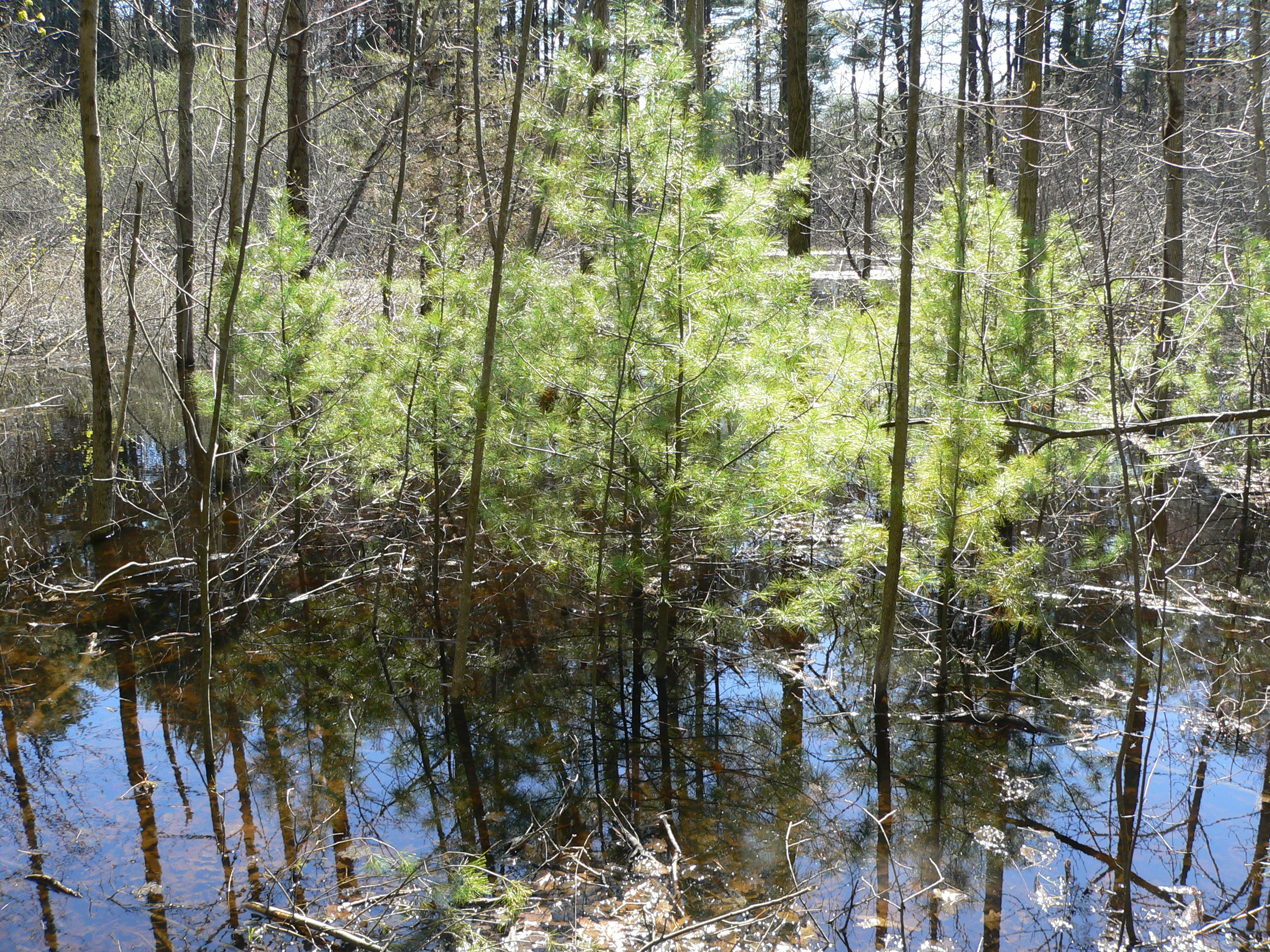

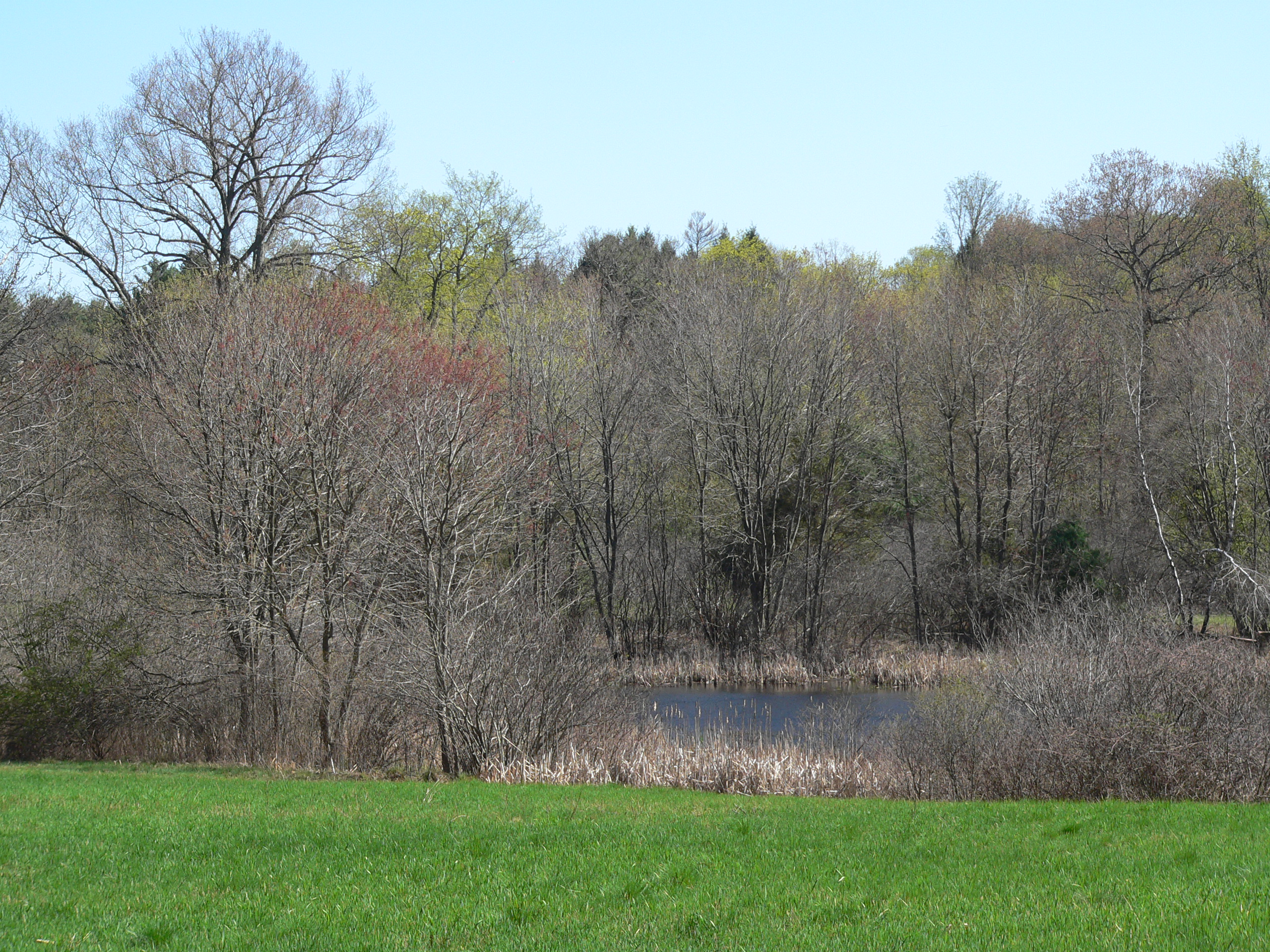
