= Sam Lee =

Sam Lee may refer to:

- Sam Lee (actor) (born 1975), Hong Kong actor
- Sam Lee (tennis) (born 1914 or 1915), American tennis player
- Sam Lee (singer) (born 1973), Taiwanese singer and songwriter
- Sam Lee (folk musician) (born 1980), British folk musician
- Sam Lee (rugby union) (1871–1944), Irish rugby union player
- Sam Lee, independent candidate in the 2021 Hartlepool by-election for the UK parliament

== See also ==
- Sammy Lee (disambiguation)
- Samuel Lee (disambiguation)
