= Clark–Northrup House =

Historic house in Massachusetts, United States

- U.S. National Register of Historic Places
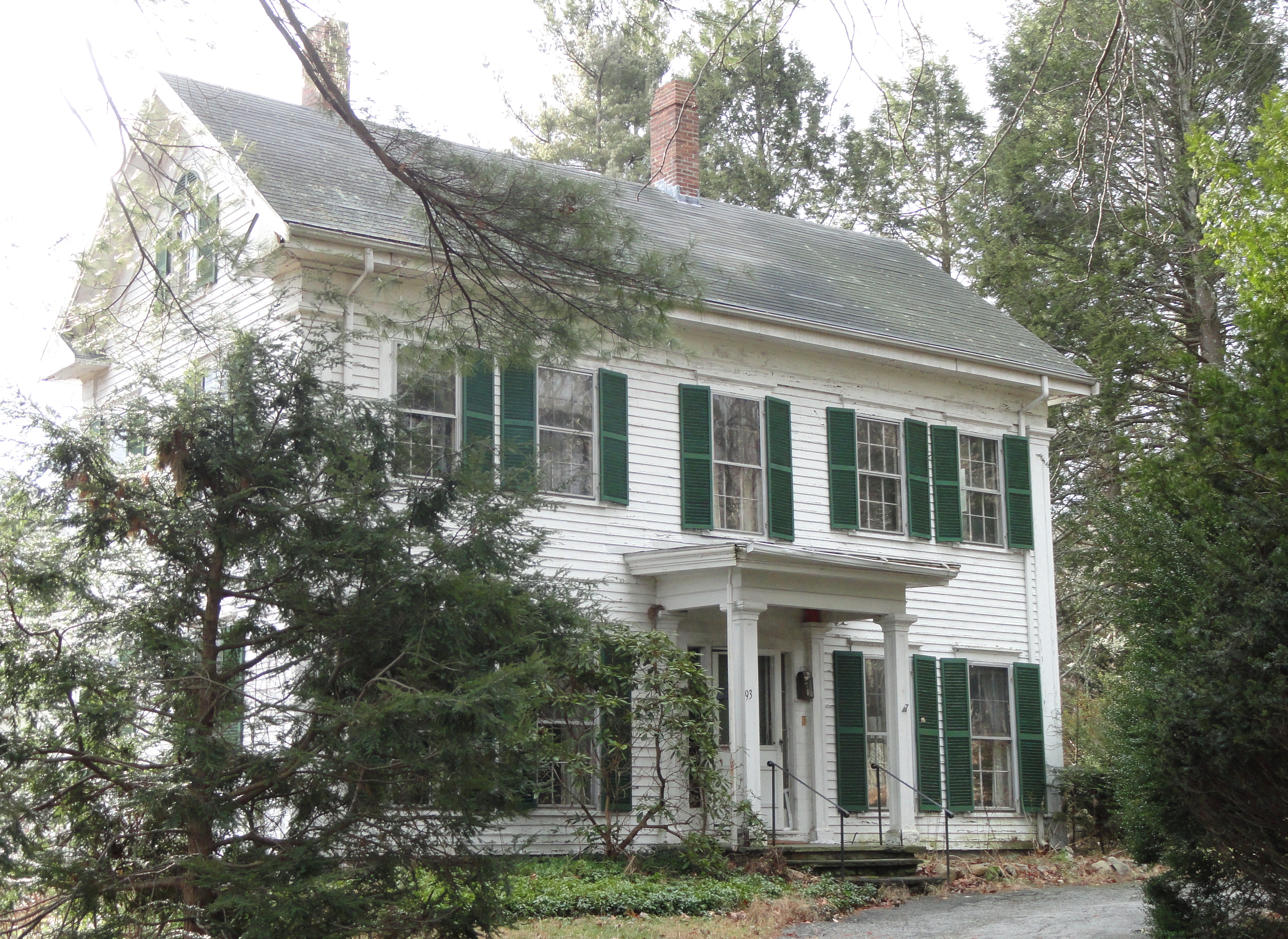

- Location within Massachusetts Location within the United States
- Location: 93 Maple St., Sherborn, Massachusetts
- Coordinates: 42°14′19″N 71°23′14″W
- Area: 5.1 acres (2.1 ha)
- Architectural style: Greek Revival
- MPS: Sherborn MRA
- NRHP reference No.: 86000497
- Added to NRHP: January 3, 1986

The Clark–Northrup House is a historic house in Sherborn, Massachusetts. Built c. 1845–55, it is a locally unusual example of a Greek Revival house with a more traditional Georgian side-gable roof. The house was listed on the National Register of Historic Places in 1986.

== Description and history ==
The Clark–Northrup House is located on the south side of Maple Street, a local through street leading west from Sherborn center. It is screened from the road by trees, and is accessed via a semicircular drive. The house is a 2 1/2-story wood-frame structure, five bays wide, with a side-gable roof, central chimney, clapboard siding, and a granite foundation. The center entry is sheltered by a flat-roof porch, supported by square posts with Doric capitals. Doric pilasters rise at the building corners to a broad entablature. The ground-floor front windows are taller than those of the second floor, and are topped by a shallow projecting cornices.

The house is estimated to have been built c. 1845–55, and was probably around the time of Nathaniel Clark's marriage in 1844. Clark was the son of Rev. Amos Clark, who lived across the street in a 1729 house. The house is locally unusual, as most Greek Revival houses have a front-facing gable and are three bays wide. Nathaniel Clark sold the house to Isaiah Northrup, a farmer, in the late 1860s or early 1870s.

== See also ==
- National Register of Historic Places listings in Sherborn, Massachusetts
