= Samuel Lee (American minister) =

American minister and politician

Samuel Lee (March 18, 1803 – August 27, 1881) was an American minister, author, and state legislator.

== Biography ==
Samuel Lee, only son of Samuel and Sarah (Burnett) Lee, of Kensington parish, in the town of Berlin, Connecticut, was born March 18, 1803. His father died a fortnight later, and in June, 1810, his mother married and removed to Westfield, in Middletown, Connecticut, from which place he entered Yale College, where he graduated in 1827. For three years after graduation he studied in the Yale Divinity School.

On November 4, 1830, he was ordained pastor of the Evangelical Church in Sherborn, Middlesex County, Massachusetts. This charge he resigned, April 27, 1836, to accept a call to the Congregational Church in New Ipswich, New Hampshire, where he was installed on the 5th of the following month. He was dismissed, December 4, 1860, worn out with hard work.

After some years of relaxation, he so far regained his health as to be able to use his pen in the preparation of a volume, entitled The Bible Regained, which appeared in 1874. He had before published several pamphlets, and in 1859 a volume on Eschatology. His writings show marked intellectual ability, and treat the subjects considered with boldness. His theological views provoked much criticism, and the tenacity with which he held them made his second pastorate a stormy one.

In 1848, 1849, and 1862, he represented New Ipswich in the New Hampshire State Legislature.

== Death ==
He died in New Ipswich, of paralysis, August 27, 1881, at the age of 78.

== Personal life ==
He was married, Nov. 3, 1834, to Emily, daughter of Deacon Samuel Fiske, of Natick, Massachusetts, who died March 5, 1843, leaving one daughter. He was next married, Jan. 14, 1846, to Lydia C., daughter of the Hon. Paul Wentworth, of Concord, New Hampshire, and sister of the Hon. John Wentworth, of Chicago; she died March 6, 1855; two of her four sons died in infancy. He was again married, June 3, 1856, to Mary Jane, widow of the Rev. David P. Smith, of Greenfield, New Hampshire, daughter of the Hon. Samuel Chandler, of Bedford, New Hampshire, and sister of the Hon. Zachariah Chandler, of Michigan. She died May 17, 1881.

This article incorporates public domain material from the 1882 Yale Obituary Record.
