= Sammy Lee =

Sammy Lee may refer to:

- Sammy Tak Lee (born 1939), Hong Kong billionaire property developer
- Sammy Lee (scientist) (1958–2012), expert in in vitro fertilisation
- Sammy Lee (diver) (1920–2016), Korean-American diver, physician, and two-time Olympic Games champion
- Sammy Lee (footballer) (born 1959), former Liverpool footballer and former Bolton Wanderers manager
- Sammy Lee (boxer) (born 1999), Welsh boxer
- Satoru Sayama (born 1957), Japanese wrestler advertised as "Sammy Lee" in the United Kingdom
- Sammy Lee (choreographer) (1890–1968), American dance director
- Sammy Lee (producer), see The Upside of Anger
- Sammy Lee, fictional character, protagonist of 1963 film The Small World of Sammy Lee

== See also ==
- Sam Lee (disambiguation)
- Samuel Lee (disambiguation)
