= Samuel Leigh =

Samuel Leigh may refer to:

- Samuel Leigh (bookseller), London
- Samuel Leigh of the Leigh Baronets
- Samuel Leigh (missionary), a Wesleyan missionary active in Australia and New Zealand from 1819 to 1831

== See also ==
- Samuel Lee (disambiguation)
