= Sawin–Bullen–Bullard House =

Historic house in Massachusetts, United States

- U.S. National Register of Historic Places
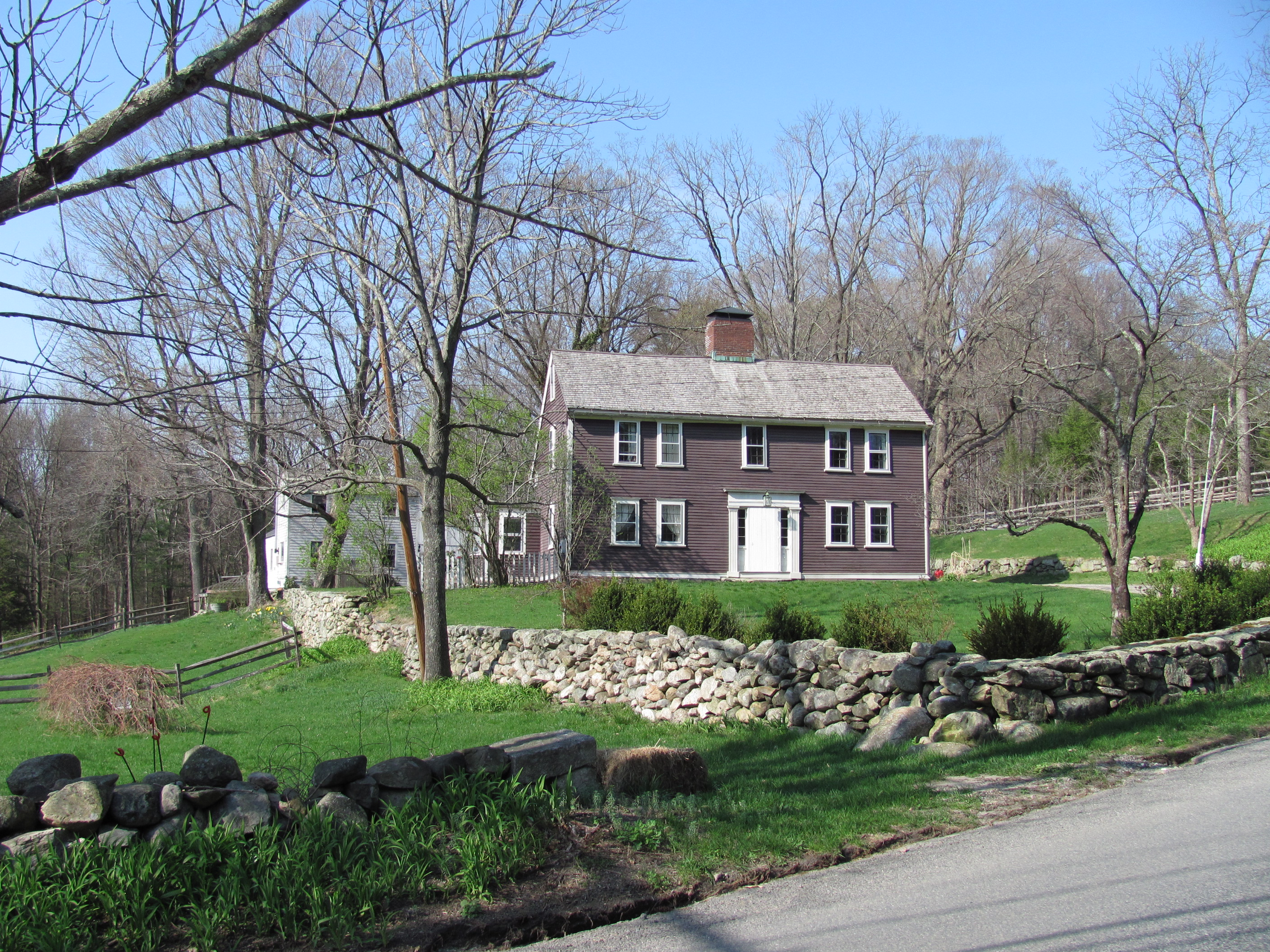
- Sawin–Bullen–Bullard House

- Location within Massachusetts Location within the United States
- Location: 60 Brush Hill Rd., Sherborn, Massachusetts
- Coordinates: 42°15′27″N 71°24′15″W
- MPS: Sherborn MRA
- NRHP reference No.: 86000509
- Added to NRHP: January 3, 1986

The Sawin–Bullen–Bullard House is a historic First Period house in Sherborn, Massachusetts. Of the town's early houses, this one shows its First Period origins the best. It is a 2 1/2-story timber-frame house, was built with an integral leanto section. It is five bays wide, with a central chimney, and a central doorway that has a 19th-century Greek Revival surround. The house's date of construction, however, is uncertain: it may have been built by Thomas Sawin, who established a sawmill on nearby Course Brook in 1679, or it may have been built by the Bullen family, who were the next owners of the land early in the 18th century. It was occupied in the 19th century by Galem Bullard, a stonemason.

The house was listed on the National Register of Historic Places in 1986.
