= Sherborn, Massachusetts =

- Town
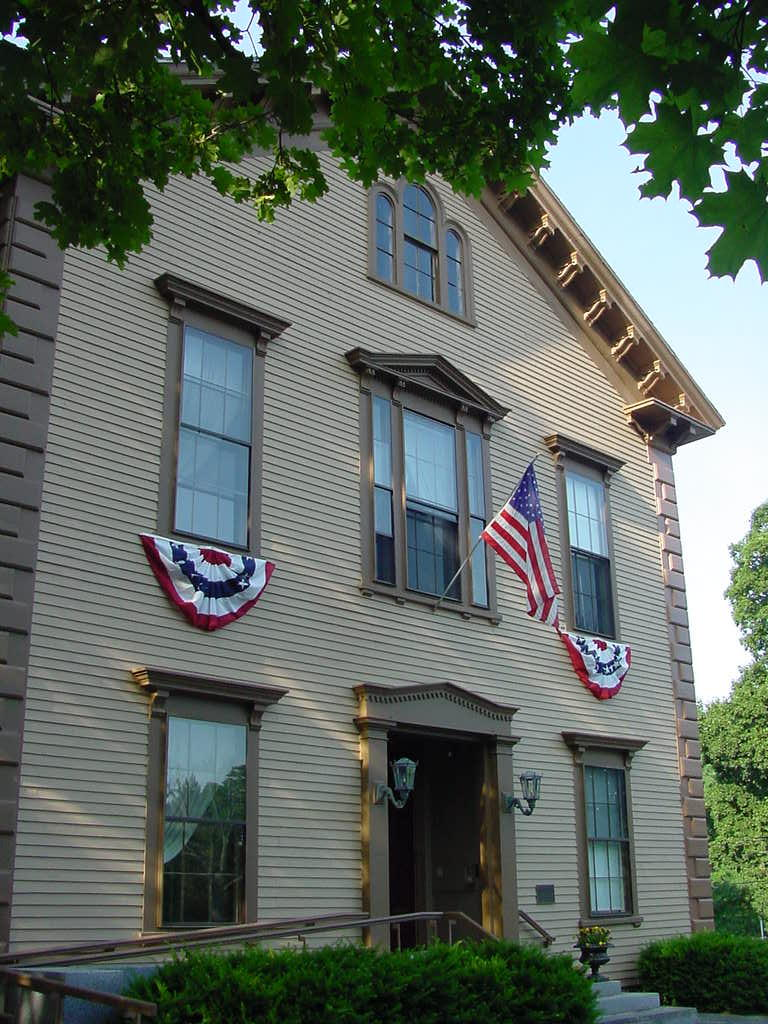
- Sherborn Community Center

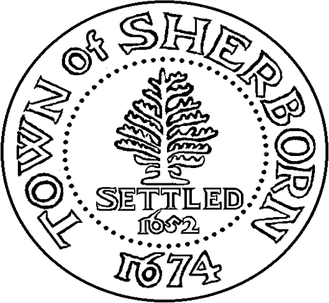
- Seal

- Location in Middlesex County in Massachusetts
- Coordinates: 42°14′20″N 71°22′13″W
- Country: United States
- State: Massachusetts
- County: Middlesex
- Settled: 1652
- Incorporated: 1674

Government
  - Type: Open town meeting
  - Town Administrator: Jeremy Marsette

Area
  - Total: 16.2 sq mi (41.9 km^{2})
  - Land: 15.9 sq mi (41.3 km^{2})
  - Water: 0.23 sq mi (0.6 km^{2})
- Elevation: 174 ft (53 m)

Population (2020)
  - Total: 4,401
  - Density: 276/sq mi (106.6/km^{2})
- Time zone: UTC−5 (Eastern)
  - Summer (DST): UTC−4 (Eastern)
- ZIP Code: 01770
- Area code: 508/774
- FIPS code: 25-61380
- GNIS feature ID: 0618233
- Website: www.sherbornma.org

Sherborn is a town in Middlesex County, Massachusetts, United States. Located in Boston's MetroWest region, the community is within area code 508 and has the ZIP Code 01770. As of the 2020 U.S. census, the town population was 4,401.

Sherborn shares its highly ranked public school system with the town of Dover. In addition to Dover, Sherborn is bordered by the towns of Natick, Framingham, Ashland, Millis, Holliston, and Medfield.

== Geography ==
The town is located 18 miles (29 km) southwest of Boston. According to the United States Census Bureau, the town has a total area of 16.2 square miles (42 km^{2}), of which 16.0 square miles (41 km^{2}) is land and 0.2 square miles (0.52 km^{2}), or 1.36%, is water, with much of that located in Farm Pond.

== Demographics ==
Historical population
Year	Pop.	±%
1850	1,043	—
1790	801	−23.2%
1860	1,129	+40.9%
1870	1,062	−5.9%
1880	1,401	+31.9%
1890	1,381	−1.4%
1900	1,483	+7.4%
1910	1,428	−3.7%
1920	1,558	+9.1%
1930	943	−39.5%
1940	1,022	+8.4%
1950	1,245	+21.8%
1960	1,806	+45.1%
1970	3,309	+83.2%
1980	4,049	+22.4%
1990	3,989	−1.5%
2000	4,200	+5.3%
2010	4,119	−1.9%
2020	4,401	+6.8%
2022*	4,372	−0.7%
* = population estimate. Source: United States census records and Population Estimates Program data.

As of the census of 2000, there were 4,200 people, 1,423 households, and 1,222 families residing in the town. The population density was 263.1 inhabitants per square mile (101.6/km^{2}). There were 1,451 housing units at an average density of 90.9/sq mi (35.1/km^{2}). The racial makeup of the town was 96.50% White, 0.38% African American, 0.05% Native American, 2.40% Asian, 0.26% from other races, and 0.40% from two or more races. Hispanic or Latino of any race were 1.12% of the population.

There were 1,423 households, out of which 46.2% had children under the age of 18 living with them, 77.5% were married couples living together, 6.3% had a female householder with no husband present, and 14.1% were non-families. 12.4% of all households were made up of individuals, and 6.0% had someone living alone who was 65 years of age or older. The average household size was 2.95 and the average family size was 3.22.

In the town, the population was spread out, with 31.9% under the age of 18, 3.2% from 18 to 24, 22.9% from 25 to 44, 30.7% from 45 to 64, and 11.3% who were 65 years of age or older. The median age was 41 years. For every 100 females, there were 93.4 males. For every 100 females age 18 and over, there were 89.6 males.

According to the 2007 U.S. census, the median income for a household in the town was $223,444, and the median income for a family was $164,063. Males had a median income of $181,291 versus $85,909 for females. The per capita income for the town was about $73,420. About 0.7% of families and 2.3% of the population were below the poverty line, including 2.4% of those under age 18 and 5.6% of those age 65 or over.

== Education ==
There is a public elementary school called Pine Hill School. The majority of middle school and high school students in Sherborn attend the Dover-Sherborn Middle School and the Dover-Sherborn High School, respectively, which are both located in Dover, Massachusetts. There are also 2 preschools in Sherborn center, ECDC and Pine Hill preschool.

== Notable people ==
- Cattle Annie, female bandit of the American Old West, worked for a time as a domestic in Sherborn after her release from the corrections facility in Framingham
- Eli Dershwitz, 2023 World Saber Champion, 2015 Under-20 World Saber Champion, and US Olympic saber fencer
- Stephanie Deshpande, contemporary American painter, best known for her portraits and narrative paintings; grew up in Sherborn, graduated from Dover-Sherborn High School in 1993
- John Halamka, physician, technology leader, blogger
- George Anthony Hill, assistant professor at Harvard and author of textbooks, primarily about physics and mathematics
- Dan Itse, engineer and inventor who serves in the New Hampshire House of Representatives, was reared in Sherborn, and graduated in 1976 from Dover-Sherborn High School
- Stan McDonald, jazz clarinetist and recording artist, lived in Sherborn
- Mel Robbins, on-air CNN commentator, television host, life coach, author, motivational speaker, and contributing editor for Success (magazine). Robbins is best known for her coverage of the George Zimmerman trial and as host of A&E's Monster In-Laws
- Jedediah Sanger, born in Sherborn in 1751, and lived there until after the Revolutionary War
- Chad Urmston, lead singer of the band Dispatch and former frontman for State Radio, attended Dover-Sherborn High School

== See also ==
- Greater Boston
- National Register of Historic Places listings in Sherborn, Massachusetts
- Open town meeting
