= Morse (surname) =

Morse is a surname of Flemish origin from old Frisian, and may refer to:

== People ==
- Alan Morse (born 1958), American guitarist
- Albert Pitts Morse (1863–1936), American entomologist
- Alex Morse (born 1989), American politician
- Alice Cordelia Morse (1863–1961), American book designer
- Alina Morse (born 2005), American teenage businessperson
- Allen B. Morse (1837–1921), American jurist
- Alpheus C. Morse (1818–1893), American architect
- Andrew Morse (born 1974), American television news executive
- Andy Morse (born 1958), American professional golfer
- Anson D. Morse (1846–1916), American educator and historian
- Anthony Morse (1911–1984), American mathematician
- Sir Arthur Morse (1892–1967), British banker
- Arthur D. Morse (1920–1971), American historian
- Barry Morse (1918–2008), British-Canadian actor
- Bessie Morse (1869–1948), American educator
- Bobby Morse (born 1965), American football running back
- Brett Morse (born 1989), British discus thrower
- Bryan Morse (1885–1939), American college football, basketball and track coach
- Bud Morse (1904–1987), American baseball second baseman and attorney
- Butch Morse (1910–1995), American football end
- Calvin Randall Morse (1847–1911), American politician
- Carlton E. Morse (1901–1993), American radio producer
- Cathy Morse (born 1955), American professional golfer
- Cecilia Morse (1838–1926), American educator and citrus farmer
- Charles Morse (disambiguation), several people
- Christine Morse (born 1973), American politician
- Christopher Morse (born 1935), American theologian
- Chuck Morse, President of the New Hampshire Senate
- Chuck Morse (journalist) (born 1972), American journalist
- Chuck W. Morse (born 1969), American anarchist
- Colin Morse (born 1955), Australian rules footballer
- Dan Morse, American archaeologist
- David Morse (disambiguation), several people
- Derrick Morse (born 1985), American football player
- Ed Morse, American politician
- Edward Morse (disambiguation), several people
- Elijah A. Morse (1841–1898), American politician
- Elizabeth Morse (Newbury witch trials) (1617–1690), English-born American accused of witchcraft
- Elizabeth Eaton Morse (1864–1955), American mycologist
- Ella Mae Morse (1924–1999), American singer
- Elmer Morse (disambiguation), several people
- Emerante Morse (1918–2018), Haitian singer, dancer and folklorist
- Emily Morse (born 1970), American sex therapist, author, and media personality
- Ephraim Morse (1823–1906), American settler of San Diego
- Eric W. Morse (1904–1986), author and historian
- Erik Morse (born 1979), journalist and rock writer
- Eugene Morse, American internal auditor and whistleblower
- F. Bradford Morse (1921–1994), American politician
- Francis Morse (1818–1886), Church of England priest
- Frank Morse (disambiguation), several people
- Franklin Morse (1873–1929), football player and journalist
- Freeman H. Morse (1807–1891), American politician
- Fuzzbee Morse, American composer, performer, and music producer
- Garry Thomas Morse, Canadian poet and novelist
- George Morse (disambiguation), several people
- Godfrey Morse (1846–1911), German-American lawyer
- H. Gary Morse (1936–2014), American billionaire
- Hap Morse (1886–1974), American baseball shortstop
- Harmon Northrop Morse (1848–1920), US American chemist
- Harold Morse (1860–?), English international footballer
- Harry N. Morse (1835–1912), ("bloodhound of the far west"), an Old West lawman
- Hayward Morse (born 1947), British actor
- Helen Morse (born 1947), Australian actress
- Henry G. Morse (1884–1934), American architect
- Hiram D. Morse (1815–?), American politician
- Horace J. Morse (1838–1930), Adjutant General of the State of Connecticut and businessman
- Hosea Ballou Morse (1855–1934), Canadian-born American British customs official and historian of China
- Saint Henry Morse (1595–1645), English priest
- Isaac Edward Morse (1809–1866), American politician
- James Morse, British Royal Navy officer
- James Shannon Morse (1783–1881), Canadian lawyer and politician
- Jedidiah Morse (1761–1826), American clergyman and geographer, father of Samuel Morse
- Jennifer Morse (disambiguation), several people
- Sir Jeremy Morse (1928–2016), British educator
- Jessica Morse (born 1982), American government official and politician
- Jo Morse (born 1932), American bridge player
- John Morse (disambiguation), several people
- Joshua Morse, American professor
- Josiah Mitchell Morse (1912–2004), American writer
- Karen Morse (water skier), British water skier
- Karen W. Morse, American chemist
- Katherine Morse, American computer scientist
- Ken Morse (born 1949), British cameraman
- Kenneth Morse (born 1946), American businessman
- Laila Morse (born 1945), British actress
- Lee Morse (1897–1954), American singer
- Leopold Morse (1831–1892), American politician
- Luis Morse (born 1940), American politician
- Macy Morse (1921–2019), American activist
- Marston Morse (1892–1977), American mathematician
- Meroë Morse (1923-1969), American photographic scientist
- Mike Morse (born 1982), American baseball player
- Neal Morse (born 1960), American musician
- Nicholas Morse (died 1772), British president of Madras
- Oliver A. Morse (1815–1870), American politician
- Philip M. Morse (1903–1985), American physicist
- Ralph Morse (1917–2014), American photographer
- Rebecca Morse (disambiguation), several people
- Reynolds and Eleanor Morse, a husband and wife team of American industrialists and philanthropists
- Richard Auguste Morse (born 1957), Haitian-American musician
- Richard McGee Morse (1922–2001), American Latin-American scholar
- Robert Morse (1931–2022), American actor
- Roger Morse (1927–2000), American biologist
- Samuel Morse (1791–1872), American inventor and painter; invented the Morse code system
- Scott Morse, American animator
- Sidney Edwards Morse (1794–1871), American inventor
- Stanford Morse (1926–2002), American politician
- Stanton Morse (born 1982), Archaeologist; USMC Combat Veteran
- Stephen Morse (designer), engineer
- Steven Morse (disambiguation), several people
- Theodora Morse (1890–1953), American lyricist
- Theodore F. Morse (1873–1924), American composer
- Tim Morse, interim CEO at Yahoo!
- Toby Morse (born 1970), American singer
- Todd Morse, American guitarist
- Wayne Morse (1900–1974), American politician
- Wesley Morse (1897–1963), American cartoonist

== See also ==
- Morse (disambiguation)
- Justice Morse (disambiguation)
