= Morse House =

Morse House may refer to:

== Hong Kong ==
- Morse House, a former headquarters of the Scout Association of Hong Kong

== United States ==
- Morse-Skinner Ranch House, Lodi, CA, listed on the NRHP in California
- LeGrand Morse House, Point Arena, CA, listed on the NRHP in California
- Charles Copeland Morse House, Santa Clara, CA, listed on the NRHP in California
- Burton Morse House, Twin Falls, ID, listed on the NRHP in Idaho
- Robert Hosmer Morse House, Lake Forest, IL, listed on the NRHP in Illinois
- Dr. Frederic D. Morse House, Lawrence, KS, listed on the NRHP in Kansas
- Morse-Libby Mansion, Portland, ME, listed on the NRHP in Maine
- Amos Morse House, Foxboro, MA, listed on the NRHP in Massachusetts
- Hastings-Morse House, Haverhill, MA, listed on the NRHP in Massachusetts
- Moses Morse House, Methuen, MA, listed on the NRHP in Massachusetts
- Daniel Morse III House, Sherborn, MA, listed on the NRHP in Massachusetts
- Morse-Barber House, Sherborn, MA, listed on the NRHP in Massachusetts
- Morse-Tay-Leland-Hawes House, Sherborn, MA, listed on the NRHP in Massachusetts
- H. Morse House, Southbridge, MA, listed on the NRHP in Massachusetts
- Morse House (Taunton, Massachusetts), listed on the NRHP in Massachusetts
- Henry Morse House, Taunton, MA, listed on the NRHP in Massachusetts
- Timothy Morse House, West Newbury, MA, listed on the NRHP in Massachusetts
- Tisdale-Morse House, Taunton, MA, listed on the NRHP in Massachusetts
- Morse-Scoville House, Constantine, MI, listed on the NRHP in Michigan
- Morse Jr., Elisha and Lizzie, House, Minneapolis, MN, listed on the NRHP in Minnesota
- Morse House (101 Fifth St., Dayton, Oregon), listed on the NRHP in Oregon
- Morse House (409 Oak St., Dayton, Oregon), listed on the NRHP in Oregon
- Robert I. Morse House, Bellingham, WA, listed on the NRHP in Washington
- Morse House (Grandview, Washington), listed on the NRHP in Washington

== See also ==
- Morse Farm (disambiguation)
