= Morse =

Morse may refer to:

== People ==
- Morse (surname)
- Morse Goodman (1917-1993), Anglican Bishop of Calgary, Canada
- Morse Robb (1902–1992), Canadian inventor and entrepreneur

== Geography ==
=== Antarctica ===
- Cape Morse, Wilkes Land
- Mount Morse, Churchill Mountains
- Morse Nunataks
- Morse Spur, Victoria Land

=== Canada ===
- Rural Municipality of Morse No. 165, Saskatchewan
  - Morse, Saskatchewan, a town
- Morse (provincial electoral district), Saskatchewan

=== China ===
- Morse Park, Hong Kong

=== New Zealand ===
- Morse River, New Zealand

=== South Georgia Island ===
- Morse Point, South Georgia Island

=== United States ===
- Morse, Iowa, an unincorporated community
- Morse, Louisiana, a village
- Morse River (Maine)
- Morse Township, Itasca County, Minnesota
- Morse Township, St. Louis County, Minnesota
- Morse, Texas, an unincorporated community and census-designated place
- Morse, Wisconsin, a town
- Morse (community), Wisconsin, an unincorporated community
- Morseman, Iowa, an extinct hamlet in Page County

=== Outer space ===
- Morse (crater), on the Moon
- 8672 Morse, an asteroid

== Arts and entertainment ==
- Inspector Morse, a fictional British detective in books by Colin Dexter and a television series
- Morse, French title for the Swedish horror film Let the Right One In
- Morse (album), by the New Zealand musician Alastair Galbraith, 1993

== Businesses ==
- Morse Diving, an American maker of diving equipment
- Morse Dry Dock and Repair Company, a defunct American company
- C.C. Morse & Co., an American supplier of seeds and part of Ferry-Morse Seed Company
- Morse Theater, Chicago, Illinois, U.S., from 1912 until 1930

== Other uses ==
- Morse College, a residential college at Yale University, Connecticut, U.S.
- Morse High School (disambiguation)
- USS Morse, a ferryboat used by the Union Navy in the American Civil War
- Morse station, a rapid transit station in Chicago, Illinois, U.S.
- Morse Auditorium, Boston University, Massachusetts, U.S.
- Morse House (disambiguation), various buildings
- Sea-lion, in heraldry sometimes called morse
- Morse, an archaic English word for the walrus
  - Morse, an archaic word for walrus ivory
- Morse chain, a chain drive with inverted teeth

== See also ==
- Morse code, a method of coding messages into long and short beeps, invented by Samuel Morse
- Morse potential, a model interatomic potential energy function
- Morse taper, a type of machine taper invented by Stephen A. Morse
- Morse theory, in mathematics
- Morse Farm (disambiguation)
- Morse Field (disambiguation)
- Morsi
