= Whitman County Gazette =

- Type: Weekly newspaper
- Format: Broadsheet
- Owner(s): Free Press Publishing
- Founder(s): Charles B. Hopkins; Lucien E. Kellogg
- Founded: 1877
- Language: English
- Headquarters: Colfax, Washington
- Circulation: 3,802 (as of 2022)
- ISSN: 2157-653X
- OCLC number: 26200048
- Website: wcgazette.com

The Whitman County Gazette is a local newspaper in Colfax, Washington, United States. It was established in 1877 as the Palouse Gazette and merged with other newspapers in the city in the early 20th century, adopting its current name in 1989. The Gazette claims to be the oldest continuously published newspaper in Washington state.

== History ==
The first issue of the Palouse Gazette was published on September 29, 1877, by local residents Charles B. Hopkins and Lucien E. Kellogg of Colfax, then a small town in Washington Territory. The newspaper was established during the Nez Perce War, which brought settlers in the Palouse in conflict with the indigenous tribes of the region. The newspaper expended to a four-page, nine-column layout in 1887, making it the largest in the Washington Territory at the time.

Kellogg sold his interests in the business to editor Ivan Chase in 1887. Later that year Hopkins sold out to W. W. Chapman, who left after two years, leaving Chase as sole owner. In 1891, J. E. Ballaine and H.T. Browne purchased the paper from Chase. Browne withdrew from the business after a year and was replaced as business manager by Howard Bramwell.

In 1893, Charles A. Elmer and W. L. Caldman purchased the paper, which around that time was renamed to the Colfax Gazette. A few months later ownership was reorganized with Caldman exiting. He was replaced by Chase, local merchant M. A. Corner and Howard Bramwell, who later took possession of the printing plant with his brother Charles. In 1897, Elmer and Corner disposed of their interests in a sale to Chase for $3,500. At that time Chase was the paper's business manager. Chase sold the Gazette in 1904 to W. L. Hunter for $5,000, and resumed ownership 18 months later. In 1901, Chase sold the Gazette to the Bramwell brothers for $1.

The Colfax Gazette, a Republican-leaning newspaper, merged with the Democratic-leaning Colfax Commoner in 1932, forming the Colfax Gazette-Commoner. The Commoner had originally been founded in 1885 and began regular publication in 1911. At the time Charles Bramwell owned the Gazette and Allen M. Lacey owned the Commoner. The two operated the new venture together. In 1948, Bill Wilmot purchased the Gazette-Commoner from Lacey, and the combined newspaper's name was reverted to the Colfax Gazette in 1958. Wilmot operated the paper until 1983 when he sold it to Matlock Communications Inc.

Two years later the paper was acquired by A. L. Alford Jr., who owned the Moscow-Pullman Daily News and Lewiston Morning Tribune. Former publisher Gordon Forgey was then installed as publisher. In 1989, the paper's name was changed again to the Whitman County Gazette to reflect its county-wide coverage. Alford sold the Gazette to long-time editor Forgey in 2003. Free Press Publishing acquired the Gazette from Forgey in March 2020 following their purchases of the Colfax Daily Bulletin and Odessa Record. The Gazette moved to a new office in Colfax in July 2020.
