= Gersten (surname) =

Gersten is a surname. Notable people with the surname include:

- Bernard Gersten (1923-2020), American theatrical producer
- Dennis Gersten, American actor and director
- Gerry Gersten (1927-2017), American political caricaturist
- Joe Gersten (born 1947), American politician
- Stephen M. Gersten (born 1940), American mathematician
