= Austin E. Lynch =

American politician

Austin E. Lynch (1885 - 1961) was an American politician. He served two terms in the Montana House of Representatives and two terms in the Montana Senate.

Lynch was the grandfather of filmmaker David Lynch.

Lynch was born in Colfax, Washington in 1885 and died in Boise, Idaho in 1961.
