= David Morse (disambiguation) =

David Morse (born 1953) is an American actor.

Dave Morse or David Morse may also refer to:

- Dave Morse (executive) (1943–2007), the co-founder of Amiga Corporate, New Technology Group, and Crystal Dynamics
- David Morse (writer) (born 1938), British literary author
- David Morse (politician) (born 1954), politician in Nova Scotia, Canada
- David A. Morse (1907–1990), American bureaucrat
- David L. Morse, American geophysicist, eponym of the Antarctic Morse Spur
