= Frank Morse =

Frank Morse may refer to:

- F. Bradford Morse (1921–1994), U.S. congressman from Massachusetts
- Frank Morse (Oregon politician), member of the Oregon State Senate
- Frank Morse (rugby league), New Zealand rugby league player
- Frank C. Morse (1859–?), Washington state pioneer and state official
- Frank Morse (architect), Boston-based marine architect, see Ladies Delight Light
