= Edward Morse =

Edward Morse may refer to:

- Edward Morse (cricketer) (born 1986), English cricketer
- Edward L. Morse (born 1942), American energy economist
- Edward P. Morse (1859–1930), Canadian-American industrialist
- Edward S. Morse (1838–1925), American zoologist and orientalist
- Teddy Morse (fl. 1870–1898), English footballer
