= Alma Stencel =

American pianist and musical prodigy (1888–1933)

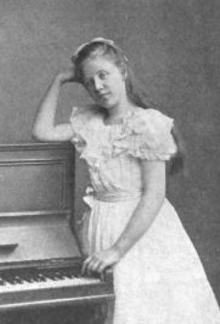
- Alma Stencel, from a 1902 publication
- Born: June 28, 1888; Colfax, Washington
- Died: July 22, 1933 (aged 45); Scarsdale, New York
- Other names: Alma Stencel Weed, Alma Weed
- Occupation: Pianist

Alma Stencel (June 28, 1888 – July 22, 1933) was an American pianist and musical prodigy.

== Early life ==
Stencel was born in Colfax, Washington, and raised in San Francisco, the daughter of Sigmund Stencel and Martha Stencel. She was a piano student of Hugo Mansfeldt, Emil Sauer in Vienna, and Leopold Godowsky in Berlin.

== Career ==
Stencel was considered a child prodigy in San Francisco. She studied in Vienna and Berlin in 1900 and 1901, and made her London debut in 1902, at age 14, at St. James' Hall.

In 1904 she toured in eastern Europe and Russia with Czech violinist Jan Kubelik. She played for Czar Nicholas II, Emperor Franz Josef, King Edward VII, and William Howard Taft during her concert career.

== Personal life ==
Stencel married mining geologist Walter Harvey Weed in 1914. Their wedding took place a few months after Weed's first wife, suffragist Helena Hill, divorced him on grounds of infidelity. They had a daughter, Almita Patricia Weed, born 1919. Alma Stencel Weed died in 1933, in Scarsdale, New York, aged 45 years.
