= Willard Bond =

American painter (1926–2012)

Willard Bond (June 7, 1926 in Colfax, Washington – May 19, 2012 in Yountville, California) was an American painter who was particularly known for his watercolor and oil paintings of yachting life. Raised in Lewiston, Idaho, he served in the United States Navy during World War II before studying art at the Art Institute of Chicago and the Pratt Institute in New York.
