= Steven Morse =

Steven, Stephen, or Steve Morse may refer to:

- A. Stephen Morse (born 1939), American electrical engineering professor
- Stephen Ambrose Morse, inventor of the Morse taper
- Stephen J. Morse, American professor of law
- Stephen P. Morse (born 1940), American computer specialist involved with Intel 8086, author of "One Step" genealogy tools
- Stephen Robert Morse, American documentary film maker
- Stephen S. Morse (born 1951), American scientist on emerging infectious diseases
- Steve Morse (born 1954), American musician
- Steve Morse (American football) (born 1963), American football player
- Steven Morse (politician) (born 1957), American politician

== See also ==
- Morse (surname)
