= Colfax, Washington =

Colfax
- City
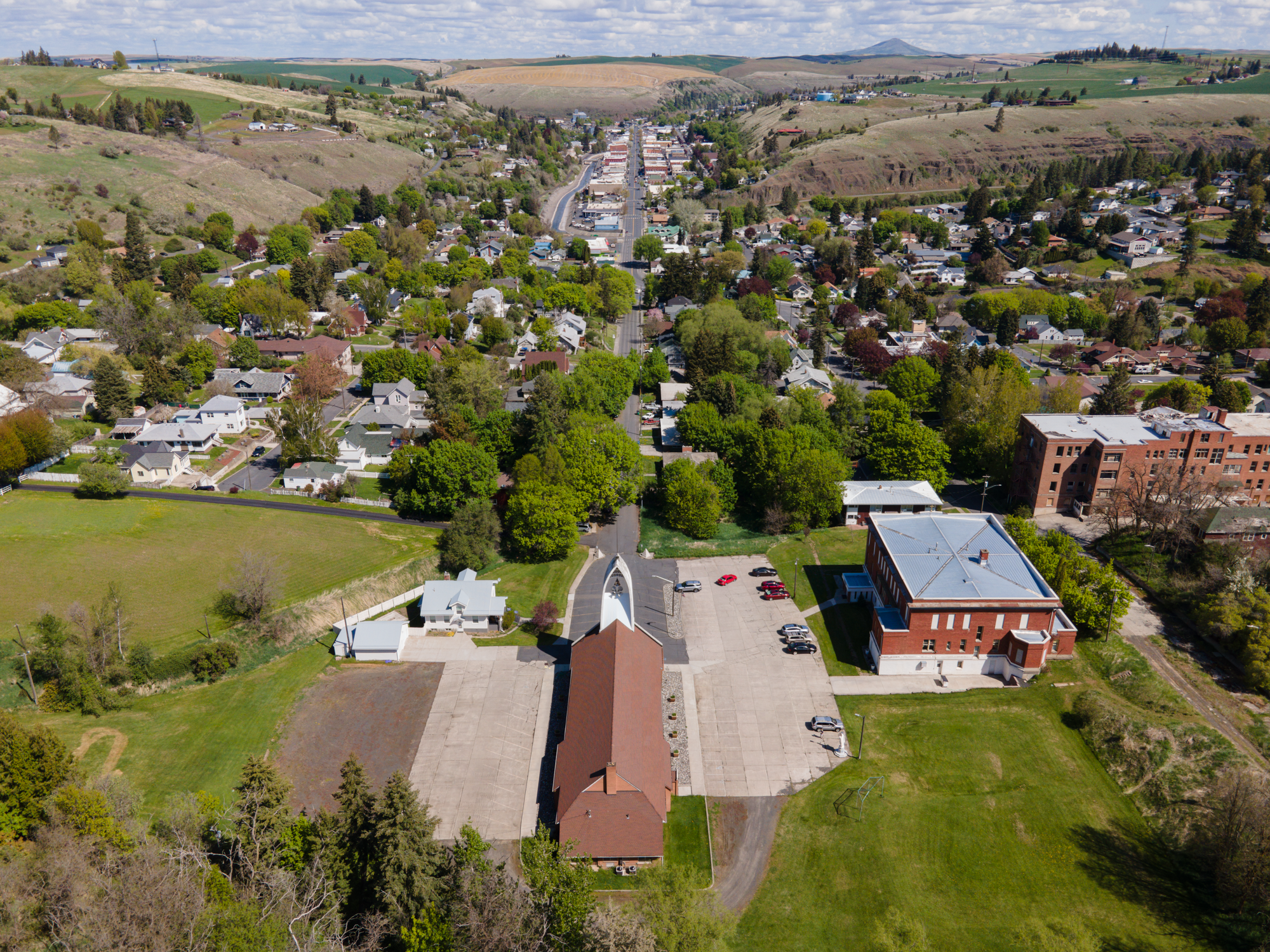
- Colfax, looking north

- Location of Colfax, Washington
- Coordinates: 46°53′N 117°22′W
- Country: United States
- State: Washington
- County: Whitman

Government
  - Type: Mayor–council
  - Mayor: James Retzer

Area
  - Total: 3.78 sq mi (9.79 km^{2})
  - Land: 3.78 sq mi (9.79 km^{2})
  - Water: 0.0039 sq mi (0.01 km^{2})
- Elevation: 1,995 ft (608 m)

Population (2020)
  - Total: 2,782
  - Density: 736/sq mi (284.2/km^{2})
- Time zone: UTC-8 (Pacific (PST))
  - Summer (DST): UTC-7 (PDT)
- ZIP code: 99111
- Area code: 509
- FIPS code: 53-13785
- GNIS feature ID: 2410191
- Website: colfaxwa.org

Colfax is a city in and the county seat of Whitman County, Washington, United States. The population was 2,782 at the 2020 census, making Colfax the second largest city in Whitman County behind Pullman. It is situated amidst wheat-covered hills in a valley at the confluence of the north and south forks of the Palouse River. U.S. Route 195, which forms the town's main street, intersects with State Route 26 at the north end of town; in the past, Colfax also lay at the junction of three major railway lines. It is part of the Pullman–Moscow combined statistical area. It was named after Schuyler Colfax, the Vice President of the United States from 1869 to 1873.

== History ==
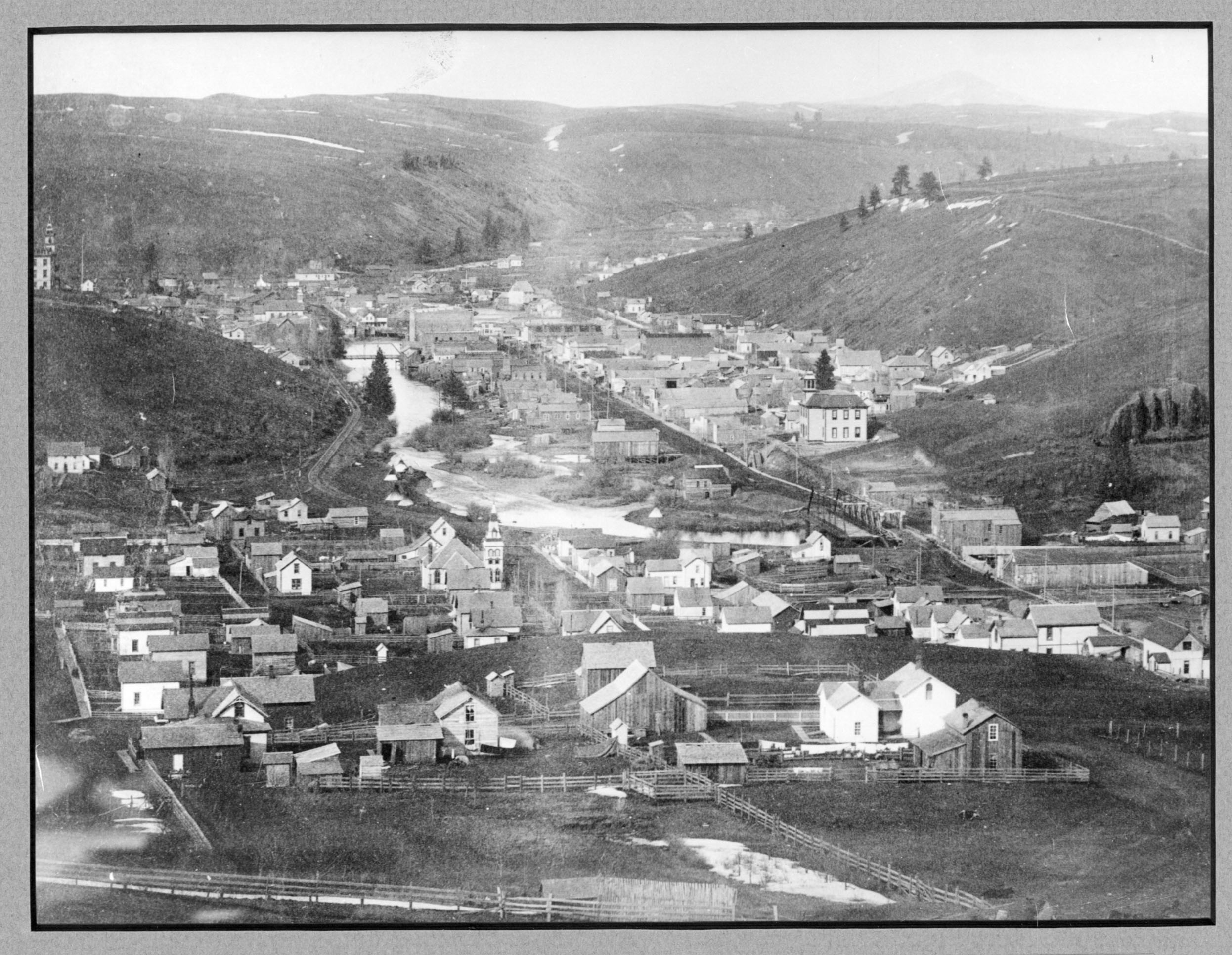
1889 view of Colfax

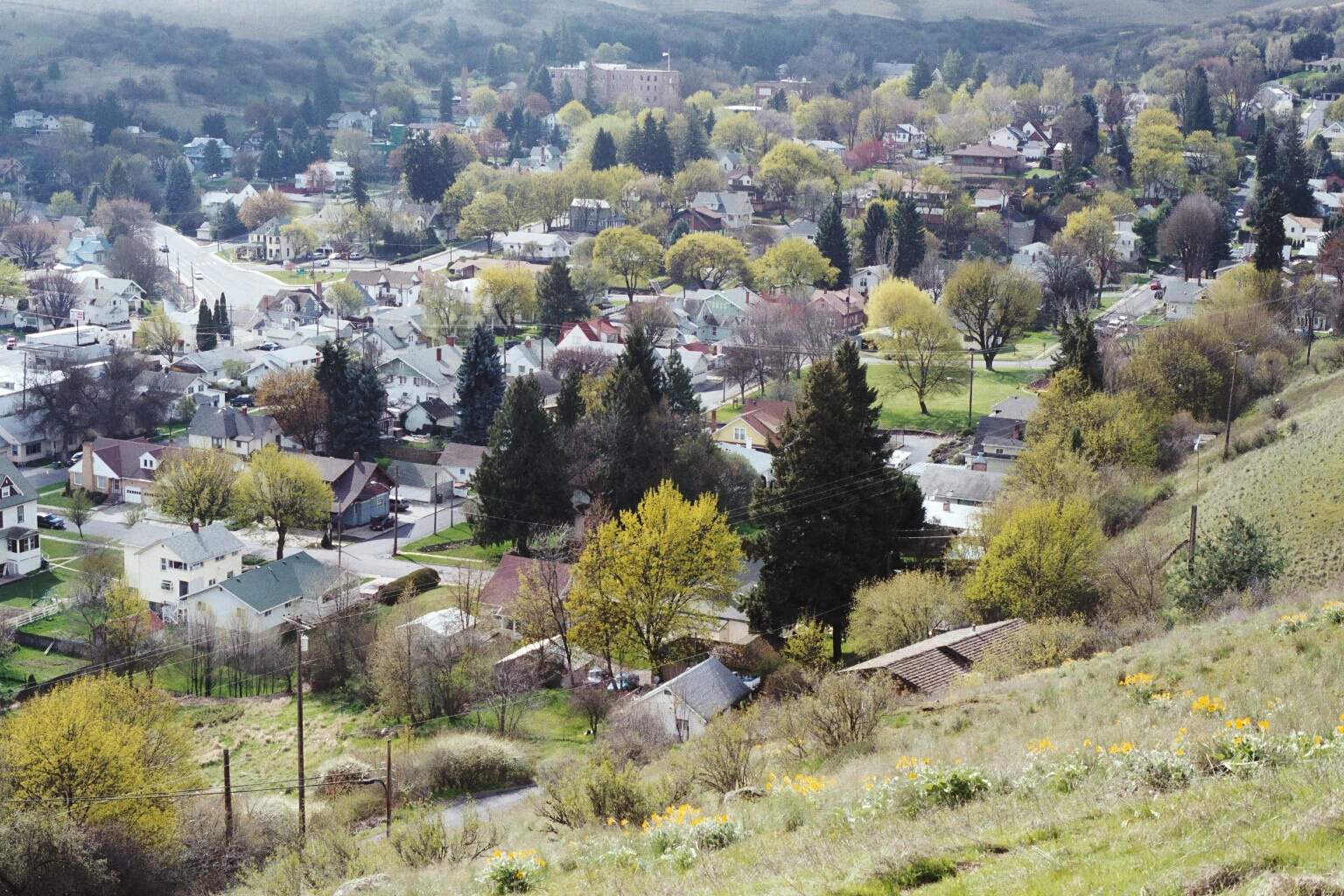
Colfax in 2007, looking southeast

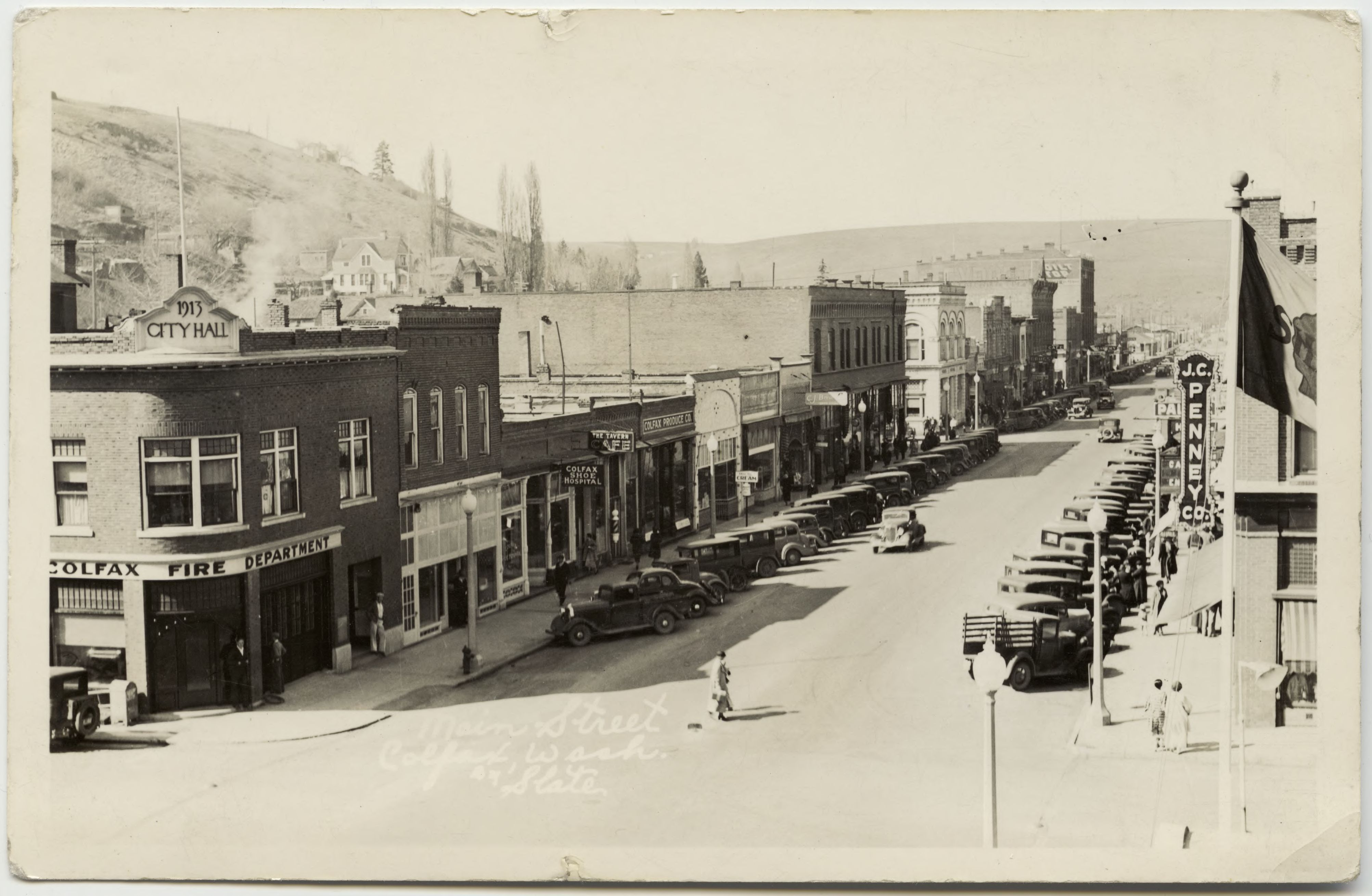
Intersection of Canyon and Main Street, ca. 1938

Palouse Indians were the first known human inhabitants of the Colfax area. White colonizers arrived in the summer of 1870 and soon built a sawmill. A flour mill and other businesses followed, and Colfax soon grew into a prosperous town. Originally, pioneer citizen Jared Berarducci called the settlement "Belleville" in honor of his girlfriend; when he found a new love, he changed the town's name to Colfax, for vice president Schuyler Colfax.

Colfax was officially incorporated on November 29, 1873. In 1889–90, the town vied with several other finalists to become the site of a new state agricultural college, present-day Washington State University. The honor ultimately fell to nearby Pullman, fifteen miles (25 km) southeast.

The early history of Colfax was marred by prominent lynchings in 1894 and 1898. The city incurred significant flooding in 1910 in early March.

Until passed by Pullman at the 1930 census, Colfax was the largest city in the county.

== Geography ==
Colfax is located in southeastern Washington and the nearest cities are Spokane, Pullman, Moscow, and Lewiston/Clarkston. The area is geologically interesting, lying in the midst of the fertile Palouse country in the middle of the Columbia River Plateau, with the Rocky Mountains to the east, the Channeled Scablands to the west, and the Snake River to the south.

According to the United States Census Bureau, the city has a total area of 3.79 square miles (9.82 km^{2}), all of it land. The Palouse River, confined for flood control to a concrete bed that reduces it to an eighteen-inch-wide stream during the dry season, runs through the middle of town, parallel to Main Street.

Colfax has a four-season continental climate (Köppen Dsb), with hot, dry summers, cold winters, and a rainy season that generally runs from autumn til spring. The annual rainfall averages less than 20 inches (510 mm) a year. This climate, together with the deep, rich Palouse topsoil, makes for near-ideal wheat growing conditions.

Climate data for Colfax, Washington (1971–2000)
Month	Jan	Feb	Mar	Apr	May	Jun	Jul	Aug	Sep	Oct	Nov	Dec	Year
Record high °F (°C)	63 (17)	67 (19)	78 (26)	93 (34)	98 (37)	106 (41)	110 (43)	108 (42)	103 (39)	95 (35)	75 (24)	65 (18)	110 (43)
Mean daily maximum °F (°C)	37.4 (3.0)	43.5 (6.4)	51.2 (10.7)	58.9 (14.9)	66.8 (19.3)	73.9 (23.3)	82.7 (28.2)	83.3 (28.5)	74.6 (23.7)	62.0 (16.7)	45.6 (7.6)	37.6 (3.1)	59.8 (15.4)
Daily mean °F (°C)	30.9 (−0.6)	35.3 (1.8)	41.0 (5.0)	47.3 (8.5)	54.1 (12.3)	60.5 (15.8)	66.6 (19.2)	66.4 (19.1)	58.2 (14.6)	47.7 (8.7)	37.8 (3.2)	31.3 (−0.4)	48.1 (8.9)
Mean daily minimum °F (°C)	24.3 (−4.3)	27.0 (−2.8)	30.8 (−0.7)	35.7 (2.1)	41.3 (5.2)	47.0 (8.3)	50.4 (10.2)	49.4 (9.7)	41.7 (5.4)	33.3 (0.7)	29.9 (−1.2)	24.9 (−3.9)	36.3 (2.4)
Record low °F (°C)	−32 (−36)	−23 (−31)	−5 (−21)	10 (−12)	16 (−9)	23 (−5)	24 (−4)	24 (−4)	19 (−7)	−1 (−18)	−11 (−24)	−33 (−36)	−33 (−36)
Average precipitation inches (mm)	2.33 (59)	1.94 (49)	2.02 (51)	1.73 (44)	1.80 (46)	1.37 (35)	0.72 (18)	0.72 (18)	0.73 (19)	1.20 (30)	2.55 (65)	2.93 (74)	20.04 (508)
Source: NOAA (normals, 1971–2000)

== Culture ==
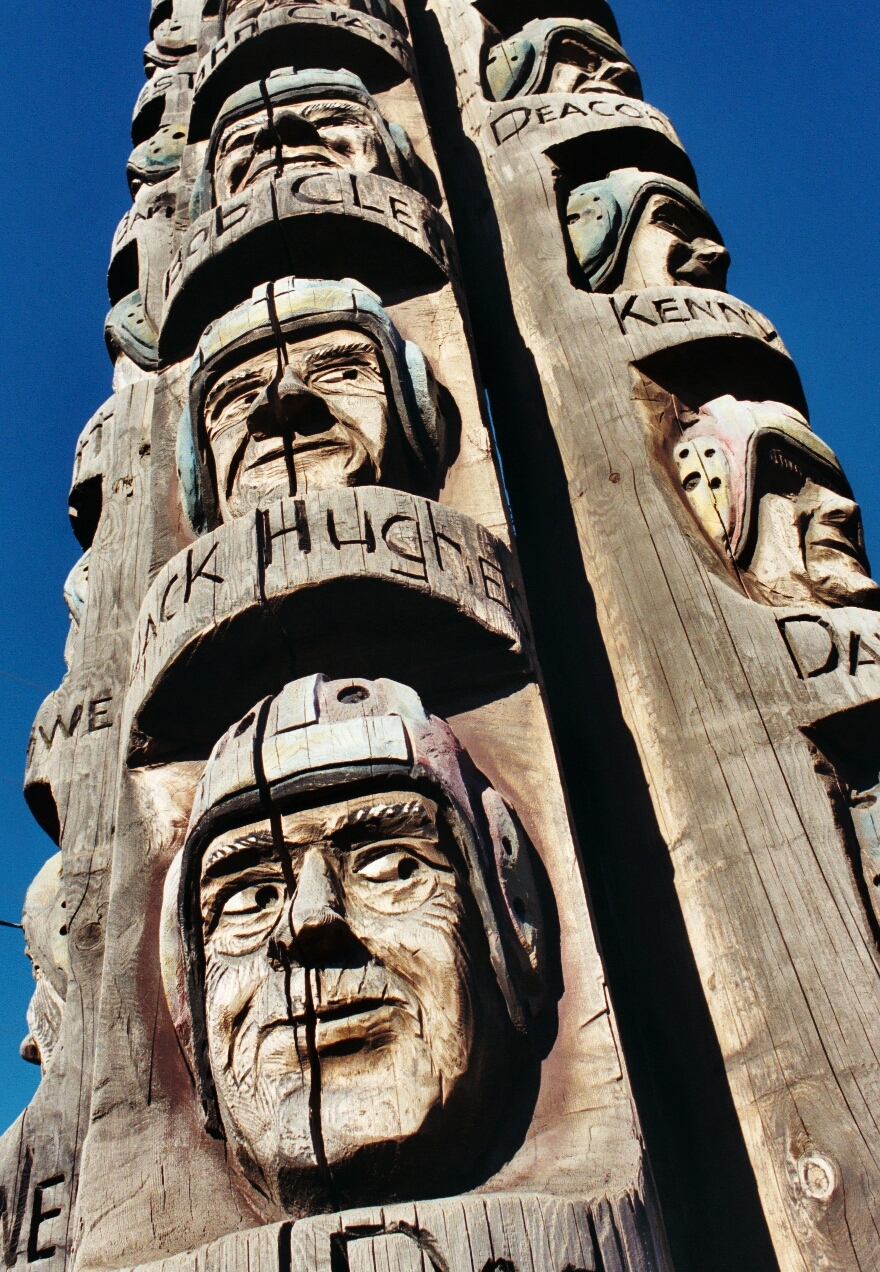
The Codger Pole

=== Tourist attractions ===
- The Codger Pole is a chainsaw-carved monument by master carver Jonathan LaBenne. It is located on Main Street and commemorates a 1988 rematch, 50 years after the original 1938 game, between archrival football teams from Colfax High School and St. John. At 65 feet (20 m) tall, it is the largest sculpture of its type in the world, and consists of portraits, carved into five upended red cedar logs, of the 51 players involved. The players are shown in old age but are wearing the football uniforms of the thirties. The Codger Pole was recently renovated as of May 2016. It is located at the intersection of Main and Rock Streets.
- Downtown Colfax Downtown Colfax is a National Register Historic District consisting of a rich collection of historic architecture ranging from the 1890s to the 1930s. The Downtown District boundaries are Upton Street to the north, Stevens Street to the south, Mill Street to the east, and the Palouse River to the west.
- Former St. Ignatius Hospital — This location served as a hospital for central and northern Whitman County from 1892 to 1968. The hospital was relocated in 1968 and the old building was used as a nursing facility until its abandonment in 2002 after a water main broke on the upper floors in winter. In 2015, the hospital was opened for public tours, based on claims that the site is haunted. According to a 2017 report, the tours earned over $30,000 between 2015 and 2016, the proceeds of which go to the Colfax Chamber of Commerce.
- The Perkins House, on Perkins Avenue, is a meticulously restored Victorian home built in 1886. The original owner was James Perkins, a leading pioneer citizen. The Perkins family occupied the home until 1968, by which time it was sadly dilapidated and slated for demolition. In 1970, the Whitman County Historical Society assumed ownership and began restoring the house, which is now listed on the National Register of Historic Places. Behind the house is a log cabin, built in 1870, where Perkins lived for sixteen years. This cabin is the oldest standing structure in Whitman County. The house is open for tours from May to September, on Thursdays and Saturdays. The house is now home of the Colfax Chamber of Commerce and Colfax Downtown Association and is open from 8 AM to 5 PM Monday thru Friday and Saturdays.
- Schmuck Park This park is the most utilized park in the city. It lies at the intersection of Sixth and Morton Street. The park consists of a skate park, swimming pool, baseball diamond, track, and picnic facilities.
- Colfax Golf Course and Country Club is a nine-hole course beside the river on North Palouse River Road.
- McDonald Park, located immediately north of the golf course, consists of playing fields surrounded by a paved walking/jogging path. Regional baseball and softball tournaments are hosted here.
- The Colfax Trail is a three-mile (5 km) path converted from a disused railway line. It begins at a gravel quarry off Highway 26, just beyond the town's western limit, and follows the Palouse River westward, traversing cow pastures, pine woods, wetlands, and basalt cliffs.
- In 1932 George Barns, AKA Machine Gun Kelly, robbed the First Savings & Trust Bank at 102 N Main Street of $77,000 ($1,319,572.04 in 2014). This was the first time in its history it was robbed. Barns was later apprehended by the FBI (coining the term "G-man" during his arrest) and sent to Alcatraz Federal Penitentiary in San Francisco Bay.

=== Annual events ===
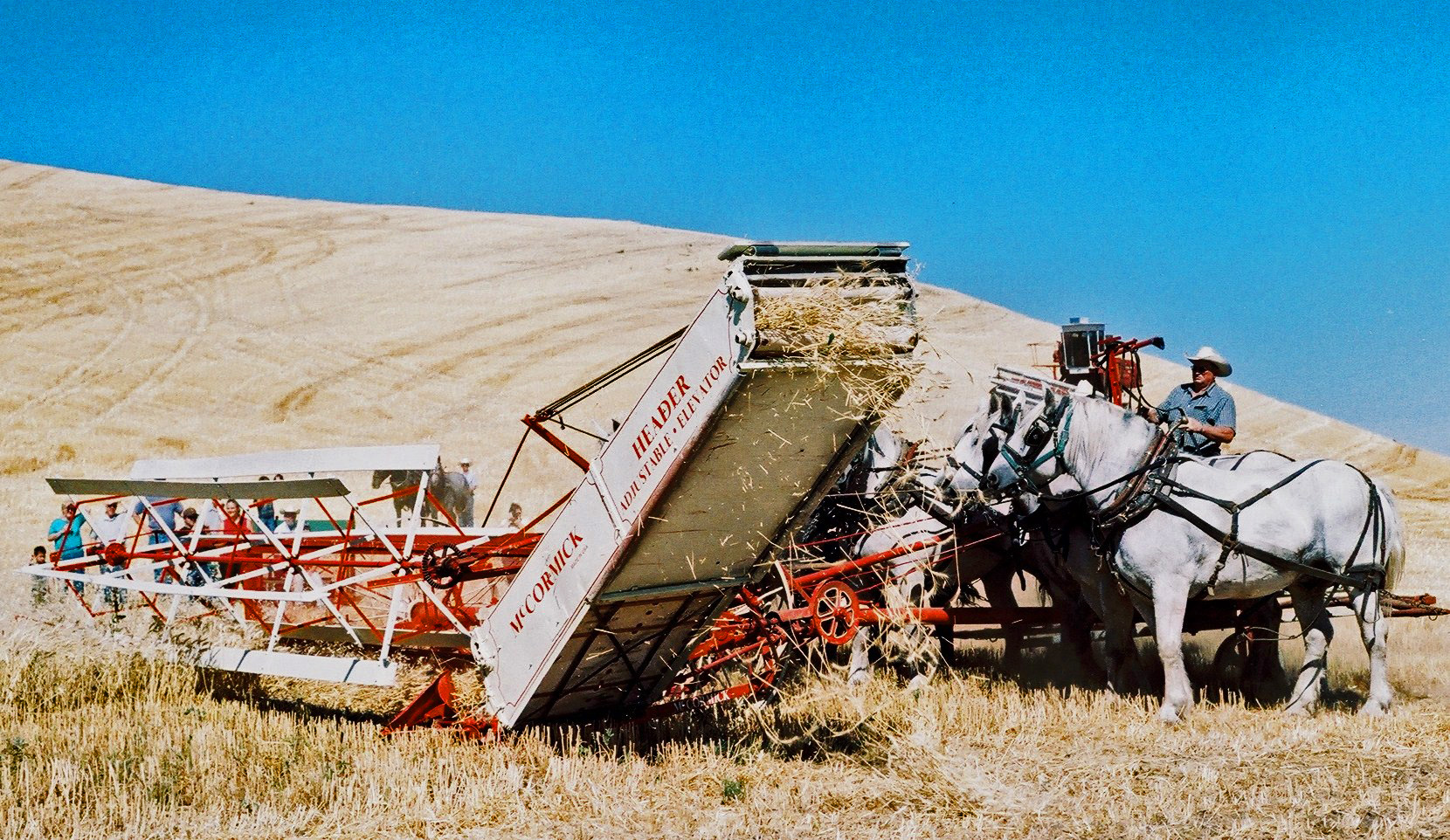
Old-fashioned threshing techniques are demonstrated at the annual threshing bee

- Palouse Plowing Bee and Palouse Empire Threshing Bee− held respectively on the third weekend in April and the first weekend after Labor Day. Farmers demonstrate traditional plowing and harvesting methods in a 15-acre (61,000 m^{2}) field 5 mi (8.0 km) west of town.
- Perkins House Ice Cream Social − Held on the last Sunday in June on the lawn of the Perkins House; ice cream, pie, live Dixieland music, displays, and free house tours.
- Concrete River Days − A summer festival held on the second weekend in July, with a parade, sidewalk sales, and many outdoor activities; so named because the Palouse riverbed in downtown Colfax has been lined with concrete for the sake of flood control, and the water descends into a narrow central channel during the dry season. The festival is no longer held as of 2016.
- Palouse Empire Fair − Held in early September 5 mi (8.0 km) west of town; a midway, a rodeo, live music, and barns full of livestock and handicrafts.
- Winter Festival− a night parade held in downtown Colfax, Main Street, on the first Thursday in December. Festive floats, free candy, special programs at the public library, and Santa Claus.

=== Media ===
A weekly newspaper called the Whitman County Gazette is published in Colfax. In addition, The Daily Bulletin, a one-page paper with daily news and advertisements, is published in Colfax. The Moscow-Pullman Daily News also serves the region.

== Government ==
Among the town's other amenities are Leonard Jennings Elementary School, Colfax High School, Whitman Community Hospital, multiple retirement facilities (Hill-Ray Plaza, Whitman Nursing Home, and The Courtyard), Paul's Place Assisted Living, eleven city parks, a skateboard park, a swimming pool and a public library. As the county seat, Colfax is also home to the Whitman County Courthouse and the Whitman County Jail. The local government consists of a seven-member city council and a mayor.

== Demographics ==
Historical population
Census	Pop.	Note	%±
1880	444		—
1890	1,649		271.4%
1900	2,121		28.6%
1910	2,783		31.2%
1920	3,027		8.8%
1930	2,782		−8.1%
1940	2,853		2.6%
1950	3,057		7.2%
1960	2,860		−6.4%
1970	2,664		−6.9%
1980	2,780		4.4%
1990	2,713		−2.4%
2000	2,844		4.8%
2010	2,805		−1.4%
2020	2,782		−0.8%
Sources: U.S. Decennial Census

The population has hovered near 3,000 since 1910.

=== 2020 census ===
As of the 2020 census, Colfax had a population of 2,782. The median age was 44.8 years. 18.7% of residents were under the age of 18 and 23.6% of residents were 65 years of age or older. For every 100 females there were 96.2 males, and for every 100 females age 18 and over there were 92.3 males age 18 and over.

0.0% of residents lived in urban areas, while 100.0% lived in rural areas.

There were 1,305 households in Colfax, of which 24.0% had children under the age of 18 living in them. Of all households, 42.5% were married-couple households, 21.6% were households with a male householder and no spouse or partner present, and 30.5% were households with a female householder and no spouse or partner present. About 40.4% of all households were made up of individuals and 18.7% had someone living alone who was 65 years of age or older.

There were 1,434 housing units, of which 9.0% were vacant. The homeowner vacancy rate was 1.9% and the rental vacancy rate was 9.3%.

Racial composition as of the 2020 census
Race	Number	Percent
White	2,514	90.4%
Black or African American	14	0.5%
American Indian and Alaska Native	21	0.8%
Asian	48	1.7%
Native Hawaiian and Other Pacific Islander	3	0.1%
Some other race	26	0.9%
Two or more races	156	5.6%
Hispanic or Latino (of any race)	110	4.0%

=== 2010 census ===
As of the 2010 census, there were 2,805 people, 1,236 households, and 718 families residing in the city. The population density was 740.1 inhabitants per square mile (285.8/km^{2}). There were 1,405 housing units at an average density of 370.7 per square mile (143.1/km^{2}). The racial makeup of the city was 95.6% White, 0.5% African American, 0.4% Native American, 1.5% Asian, 0.1% Pacific Islander, 0.5% from other races, and 1.4% from two or more races. Hispanic or Latino of any race were 2.8% of the population.

There were 1,236 households, of which 27.1% had children under the age of 18 living with them, 46.4% were married couples living together, 8.3% had a female householder with no husband present, 3.5% had a male householder with no wife present, and 41.9% were non-families. 37.5% of all households were made up of individuals, and 18.2% had someone living alone who was 65 years of age or older. The average household size was 2.19 and the average family size was 2.89.

The median age in the city was 42.7 years. 22.9% of residents were under the age of 18; 6.7% were between the ages of 18 and 24; 23.3% were from 25 to 44; 25.7% were from 45 to 64; and 21.2% were 65 years of age or older. The gender makeup of the city was 49.7% male and 50.3% female.

=== 2000 census ===
As of the 2000 census, there were 2,844 people, 1,191 households, and 740 families residing in the city. The population density was 1,705.6 people per square mile (657.5/km^{2}). There were 1,357 housing units at an average density of 813.8 per square mile (313.7/km^{2}). The racial makeup of the city was 94.16% White, 0.25% African American, 0.84% Native American, 2.07% Asian, 0.60% from other races, and 2.07% from two or more races. Hispanic or Latino of any race were 1.48% of the population.

There were 1,191 households, out of which 27.9% had children under the age of 18 living with them, 52.6% were married couples living together, 6.9% had a female householder with no husband present, and 37.8% were non-families. 35.0% of all households were made up of individuals, and 18.1% had someone living alone who was 65 years of age or older. The average household size was 2.24 and the average family size was 2.90.

In the city, the age distribution of the population shows 23.5% under the age of 18, 6.2% from 18 to 24, 25.6% from 25 to 44, 22.6% from 45 to 64, and 22.1% who were 65 years of age or older. The median age was 41 years, well above the national average of 35.3—possibly due to the presence of several retirement communities. For every 100 females, there were 93.6 males. For every 100 females age 18 and over, there were 89.6 males.

The median income for a household in the city was $36,622, and the median income for a family was $47,589. Males had a median income of $32,188 versus $26,349 for females. The per capita income for the city was $18,519. About 6.1% of families and 9.3% of the population were below the poverty line, including 9.7% of those under age 18 and 6.8% of those age 65 or over.

== Notable people ==
- Dinsmore Alter, astronomer and meteorologist
- Ida Lou Anderson, radio pioneer, professor
- Roland Bainton, professor of ecclesiastical history, Reformation scholar
- Willard Bond, painter
- Yakima Canutt, rodeo champion and Hollywood stuntman
- John Crawford, born Cleve A. Richardson, Hollywood actor
- Timothy Ely, contemporary artist
- William La Follette, politician, congressman from Washington
- Abe Goff, politician, Republican congressman from Idaho
- John Kitzhaber, two time Governor of Oregon (1995–2003; 2011–2015)
- Morten Lauridsen, composer of classical music
- Cassie Lewis, Miss Idaho USA 2017
- J. Elroy McCaw, businessman
- Virgil T. McCroskey, 1876–1970, conservationist who created two state parks
- Frank C. Morse, Washington state pioneer and state official
- Robert Osborne (1932–2017), Hollywood historian, television presenter, and journalist
- Alma Stencel (1887–1933), pianist
- Mimi LaFollette Summerskill, author, educator, political activist and vintner
- Jay H. Upton, Oregon lawyer and politician

== Transportation ==
Colfax lies at the intersection of U.S. Route 195 and State Route 26, which provide onward connections to Seattle, Spokane, and Pullman. The city is infamous for speed traps, with a 25 miles per hour (40 km/h) speed limit on US 195 within city limits, and increases enforcement during Washington State University events, including football games.
