= Henry Morse House =

Historic house in Massachusetts, United States

- U.S. National Register of Historic Places
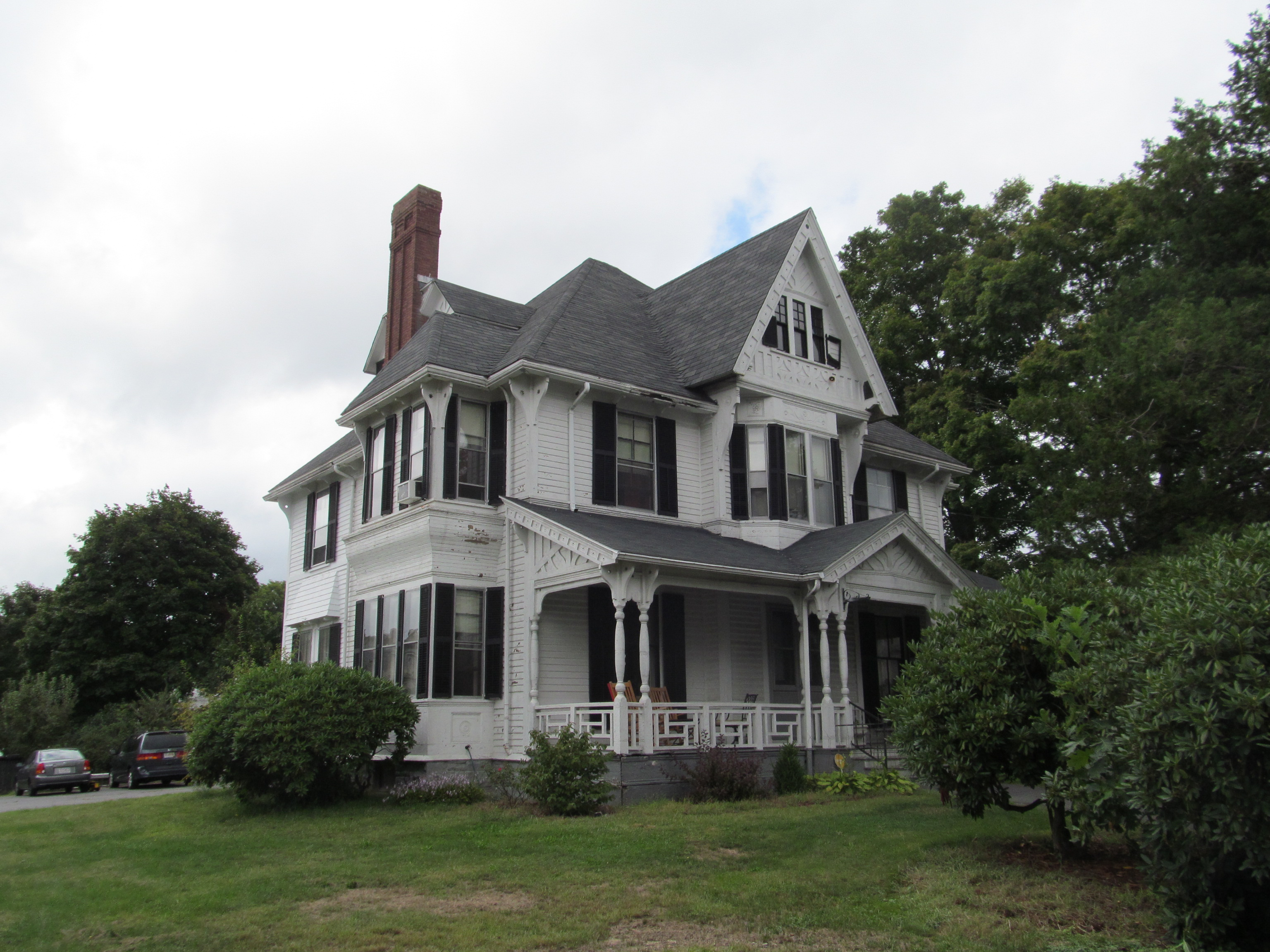
- Henry Morse House, September 2012

- Location within Massachusetts Location within the United States
- Location: 32 Cedar St., Taunton, Massachusetts
- Coordinates: 41°54′13″N 71°5′26″W
- Built: 1882
- Architectural style: Queen Anne
- MPS: Taunton MRA
- NRHP reference No.: 84002183
- Added to NRHP: July 5, 1984

The Henry Morse House is a historic house located at 32 Cedar Street in Taunton, Massachusetts.

== Description and history ==
It is a 2 1/2-story, wood-framed building, with a hipped roof and clapboard siding. Projecting bays are found at the front and side, and the front porch is supported by turned posts. The Queen Anne style house was built in 1882 on land that Henry Morse acquired from his father Lovett's estate after he died in 1880. The house is nearly identical in plan to the W.C. Beattie House in Taunton.

It was added to the National Register of Historic Places on July 5, 1984.

== See also ==
- National Register of Historic Places listings in Taunton, Massachusetts
