= Gerry Gersten =

American cartoonist

Gerry Gersten (October 17, 1927 – January 12, 2017) was a political caricaturist, known for his pencil on vellum technique.

Gersten emerged as a noted caricaturist in the 1960s, for his illustrations books and magazines such as The New York Times, New York, Sports Illustrated, Time, Newsweek, Rolling Stone, and Esquire. Beginning in 1986 he began illustrating features for Mad, illustrating 39 features for that publication until 2001.

Both football player Joe Namath and then-U.S. Vice President George H. W. Bush so liked Gersten's caricatures of them that they each requested personal copies of them, with Bush in particular calling Gersten's rendition of him a "masterpiece", the original of which Gersten gave to Bush as a gift.

== Early life ==
Gerry Gersten was born October 17, 1927, in New York City to Polish Jewish immigrant parents. He and his sister Hedy grew up in The Bronx, New York City. His parents did not agree with his decision to become an illustrator. "I remember once picking up a copy of Life magazine and saying to them, ‘A page in this magazine would cost an advertiser $50,000, of course you can make a living in this field.' But I couldn't convince them. They wanted me to be an accountant." Gersten studied at Cooper Union, graduating in 1950.

== Career ==
Gersten emerged as a noted caricaturist in the 1960s, drawing illustrations in hundreds of books and magazines such as The New York Times, New York, Sports Illustrated, Time, Newsweek, Rolling Stone, and Esquire.

Gersten drew depicted U.S. President Franklin Roosevelt averting his eyes from the Holocaust on the cover of Arthur D. Morse's 1968 book While Six Million Died.

After NFL quarterback Joe Namath led the New York Jets to victory in the 1969 Super Bowl, Gersten produced a caricature of him that Namath liked so much that he requested a copy for himself. Gersten agreed on the condition that Namath autograph a copy for his son.

Nick Meglin interviewed Gersten for his 1973 book The Art of Humorous Illustration.

In 1985 Mad co-editors John Ficarra and Meglin were searching for new artists for the magazine, specifically for craftsmen with unique styles that could expand the boundaries of what was generally thought of as Mad art. Ficarra came across a copy of the New York Times Book Review containing a book club ad featuring Gersten's caricatures of writers such as Ernest Hemingway and Edgar Allan Poe. After Meglin related to Ficarra his positive assessment of Gersten based on his art and his prior interview of him for his 1973 book, the two editors put Gersten in a list of artists to consider. A few weeks later, contributing writer Frank Jacobs submitted a parody President Ronald Reagan composed in the style of the Edgar Allan Poe poem "The Raven" called "The Reagan", which would appear in issue 265 (September 1986). Seeing an opportunity to have Gersten's art appear in Mad and thus effect a new look for the magazine (something they would eventually refer to as an "impact piece"), they hired him to illustrate the feature. Unlike the stanza-by-stanza multi-panel layout that typified the magazine at the time, the entire poem was printed on one page, while the entire opposite page was devoted to Gersten's illustration, which the editors were pleased with. Over the next 23 years, Gersten illustrated 39 articles for Mad, including numerous other impact pieces. He also redefined the recurring feature "The MAD Nasty File". His last piece for Mad was in issue #410 in 2001.

During George H. W. Bush's tenure as the Vice President of the United States, Gersten drew a caricature of him that Bush praised as a "masterpiece", and of which Bush requested a copy. Gersten gave the original to Bush as a gift.

In 2008, shortly before historian and author Rafael Medoff finished the manuscript of his book, Blowing the Whistle on Genocide: Josiah E. DuBois Jr. and the Struggle for a U.S. Response to the Holocaust, he contacted Gersten to request that Gersten provide the cover illustration of Josiah E. DuBois Jr.. Recalling his cover for While Six Million Died forty years earlier, Medoff has explained, "He was the artist who drew that memorable portrait of FDR averting his eyes from the Holocaust-now I wanted him to draw the whistle-blower who forced Roosevelt to stop averting his eyes." Gersten accepted the job, saying, "You don’t get too many opportunities to draw somebody whom you deeply admire. I wasn’t going to miss the chance." DuBois's son Robert called the illustration "a terrific likeness of Dad, and a wonderful tribute to what he did to save people from the Nazis." At the Wyman Institute conference, where the book's launch was held, Medoff praised Gersten while relating to the audience the story behind the book's cover, saying, "This is one of the few times that you really can judge a book by its cover. And I hope you will."

Gersten has collected awards from The Society of Illustrators, The Art Director's Club, and The Society of Publication Designers. His work has been exhibited at the Brooklyn Museum, the Spectrum Gallery, the Daz-marcel Gallery in New York City, various galleries in Connecticut, the Museum of American Illustration, and the Cornell Museum.

== Personal life and death ==
Gersten lived for a period in Weston, Connecticut, before ultimately moving to Ridgefield, Connecticut. He had a son, a daughter, Jill Gersten-Reitman, and two grandchildren.

Gersten died on January 12, 2017, after a long battle with Parkinson's disease. Mad included a tribute to Gersten and his career in issue 545 of that publication. His funeral was held in Hawthorne, New York.
