= Charles Morse =

Charles or Chuck Morse may refer to:

- Charles Copeland Morse (1842–1900), American businessman known as the "American Seed King"
- Charles E. Morse (1841–1920), Civil War soldier and Medal of Honor recipient
- Charles W. Morse (1856–1933), New York businessman, involved in ice, shipping and banking
- Charles Morse (cricketer) (1820–1883), English cricketer
- Chuck Morse (born 1960), President of the New Hampshire Senate
- Chuck Morse (journalist), American conservative journalist
- Chuck W. Morse (born 1969), American anarchist, academic, translator, and writer
- Charles Morse Stotz (1899–1985), American architect and historical preservationist
- Charles Hosmer Morse (1828–1895), founder of Fairbanks-Morse corporation
- Charles Fessenden Morse (1839–1926), lieutenant colonel in the Union Army during the American Civil War
