= Jennifer Morse =

Jennifer Morse may refer to:

- Jennifer Morse (mathematician), American mathematics researcher and professor
- Jennifer Roback Morse (born 1953), American economist and anti-LGBT activist
