= Elmer Morse =

Elmer Morse may refer to:

- Elmer A. Morse (1870–1945), U.S. Representative from Wisconsin
- Elmer D. Morse (1844–?), Wisconsin State Senator
