= Lewiston Morning Tribune =

Newspaper in Lewiston, Idaho, U.S.

Coordinates: 46.4228°N 117.0269°W

- Type: Daily newspaper
- Founder(s): Eugene L. Alford; Albert H. Alford
- Publisher: Nathan Alford
- President: A. L. Alford Jr., president, TPC Holdings
- Editor: Nathan Alford
- Managing editor: Matt Baney
- Metro editor: Jennifer Ladwig
- Opinion editor: Marty Trillhaase
- Photo editor: August Frank
- Founded: 1892; 134 years ago Daily (1898)
- Headquarters: 505 Capital Street; Lewiston, Idaho, U.S.
- City: Lewiston, Idaho
- Country: United States
- Circulation: 24,515 Daily; 26,005 Sunday (as of 2014)
- Sister newspapers: Moscow-Pullman Daily News
- ISSN: 0892-2586
- OCLC number: 232117597
- Website: lmtribune.com

The Lewiston Morning Tribune is an independently owned newspaper in the northwestern United States, located in Lewiston, Idaho. Founded in 1892, it serves eight counties in north-central Idaho and southeastern Washington, the southern portion of the Inland Empire. As of 2017, the Lewiston Tribune has a circulation of 25,000 papers in north-central Idaho and southeastern Washington.

It was the first newspaper in Idaho to publish an electronic edition, which was offered in September 1995.

== Founding and ownership ==
Eugene L. Alford and Albert H. Alford founded the Lewiston Morning Tribune in 1892. It started as a four-page weekly newspaper in 1892 and it went to twice-weekly in 1895. Later it became a morning daily newspaper in 1898. Eugene worked as the publisher and business manager while Albert assumed the position of editor.

After Albert H. Alford died in 1928, his nephew Albert L. Alford (1907–1968) returned to Lewiston from Washington and Lee University in Virginia to assume the position as a managing editor, then became the publisher and editor after his father's death in 1946. Known to his friends as "Bud" Alford, Albert continued to work for the Tribune for 43 years. Following his death in 1968, his son, A.L. Alford Jr., became the third publisher of the Tribune.

Following 89 years of local ownership, two-thirds of the stock was sold in 1981 to Kerns-Tribune. A.L. Alford Jr. repurchased the Tribune from TCI (who had purchased Kerns-Tribune in 1997) in a deal that was finalized March 31, 1998. The transition also introduced an employee ownership component to the business. Nathan Alford became the editor and publisher on October 1, 2008. after the retirement of his father A L Butch Alford, making him the fourth publisher of the Tribune.
