= Morse Theater =

Coordinates: 42°0′29.8″N 87°39′54.1″W

The Morse Theater operated in the East Rogers Park neighborhood of Chicago from 1912 until 1930. Since then, it has operated as the Co-Ed Theater, a synagogue, a cobbler, a jazz club, the Mayne Stage, and most recently in 2022, it reopened as the Rhapsody Theater.

== History ==
Located at 1328 W. Morse Ave. in Chicago, the Morse Theater opened in 1912 as a 600-seat nickelodeon and vaudeville house. From 1930 to 1954 it operated as the Co-Ed Theater, a reference to its proximity to Loyola University. Starting in 1955 the building was used as a synagogue for the Congregation Beth Israel Anshe Yanova. In 1977 the building came under ownership of the Geroulis family and housed their business, Cobblers Mall. The shoe repair shop moved to a smaller location on the same block in 2004.

In 2008 the theater underwent a $6 million renovation to become a jazz club featuring cabaret style seating and a high end audio system, once again operating as the Morse. That same year, the newly renovated Morse was damaged in what officials suspected to be arson motivated by anti-gentrification sentiments. The Morse Theater suffered its next setback when the building owners entered into a dispute with its operators in 2009. It closed when efforts to resolve this dispute failed.

The theater reopened under new management in 2010 as the Mayne Stage, a theater focused on live music and comedy. The new name was a reference to the location of the theatre, on the intersection of Morse Ave and Wayne Ave. The Mayne Stage was viewed as a potential sign of renewal in what had been an economically challenged neighborhood. After six years, owner Jennifer Pritzker and management company Tawani Enterprises closed the Mayne Stage as a public venue for concerts. Between 2016 and 2022, the theater operated as a site for private events.

In June 2022, the venue reopened as the Rhapsody Theater, under the management of Ricardo T. Rosenkranz. The venue currently hosts live performances, including music and magic shows.
