= W. C. Beattie House =

Historic house in Massachusetts, United States

- U.S. National Register of Historic Places
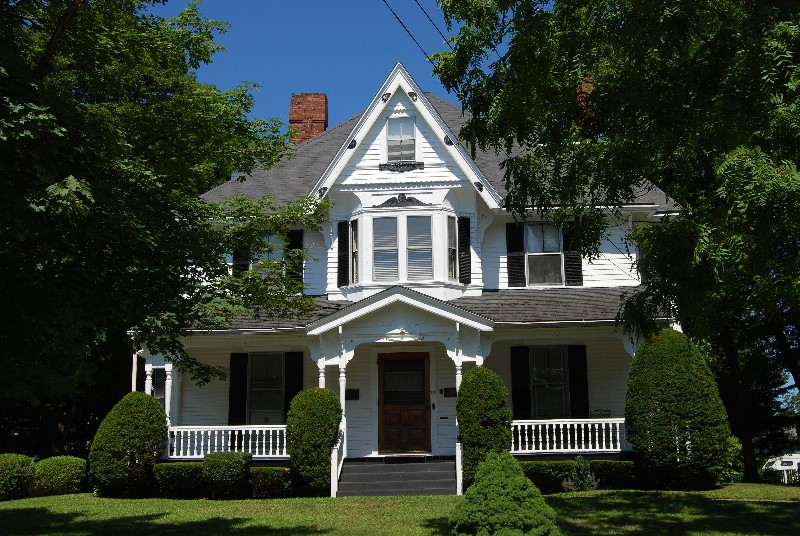
- 289 W. Brittania Street

- Location within Massachusetts Location within the United States
- Location: 289 W. Brittania St., Taunton, Massachusetts
- Coordinates: 41°55′7″N 71°6′24″W
- Built: 1882
- Architectural style: Queen Anne
- MPS: Taunton MRA
- NRHP reference No.: 84002092
- Added to NRHP: July 5, 1984

The W. C. Beattie House is a historic house located at 289 West Brittania Street in Taunton, Massachusetts.

== Description and history ==
The house was built in 1882 for W. C. Beattie, a designer at Reed & Barton. It is among the best extant examples of a large-scale builder-produced Queen Anne residence in the city. The 2 1/2-story building has a hipped-roof projecting, gable sections, and porch with a decorated gabled portico.

The house was added to the National Register of Historic Places on July 5, 1984.

== See also ==
- National Register of Historic Places listings in Taunton, Massachusetts
