= LeGrand Morse House =

- U.S. National Register of Historic Places
- Location within California
- Location: 365 Main St., Point Arena, California
- Coordinates: 38.912047°N 123.692090°W
- Area: less than one acre
- Architectural style: Greek Revival
- MPS: Point Arena MPS
- NRHP reference No.: 90001362
- Added to NRHP: September 13, 1990

The LeGrand Morse House, at 365 Main St. in Point Arena in Mendocino County, California was listed on the National Register of Historic Places in 1990.

It was built in the 1870s for LeGrand Morse, a local teacher, clerk, lawyer and legislator. It has some elements of vernacular Greek Revival style.

It is an east-facing one-story house with a U-shaped plan, with three gable-roofed segments. The front door is inside the U, under a shed-roofed porch. The house, surrounded by a picket fence, is in a residential area north of the town's commercial center.

Its National Register nomination provides this interesting explanation of its importance:

This house is associated with one of Point Arena's founding families and is the only building directly linked with one of its early leading citizens. Dr. J. G. Morse arrived in Point Arena in 1858; his son Le Grand followed a year later. Le Grand Morse had a career of increasing prominence, beginning as a teacher and store clerk, moving into the sales of drugs and general merchandise, and finally becoming a lawyer and state legislator. It is unclear whether he had the house built for himself or moved into it sometime after its construction. In any case, he lived there during the most productive years of his life. His career ended on a sad note when he was arrested and imprisoned for accidentally poisoning his mother in 1898. (He was trying to murder his brother.) Morse, one of the last of the town's original settlers, died in 1907. The house itself is a curious example of residential building in the 1870s. The construction materials all date from that era, but the irregularly shaped U—plan appears as if the elements of the building were somehow pieced together after construction. The house shows that leading citizens of Point Arena did not require pretentious dwellings.
