= Robert Hosmer Morse House =

Historic house in Illinois, United States

- U.S. National Register of Historic Places
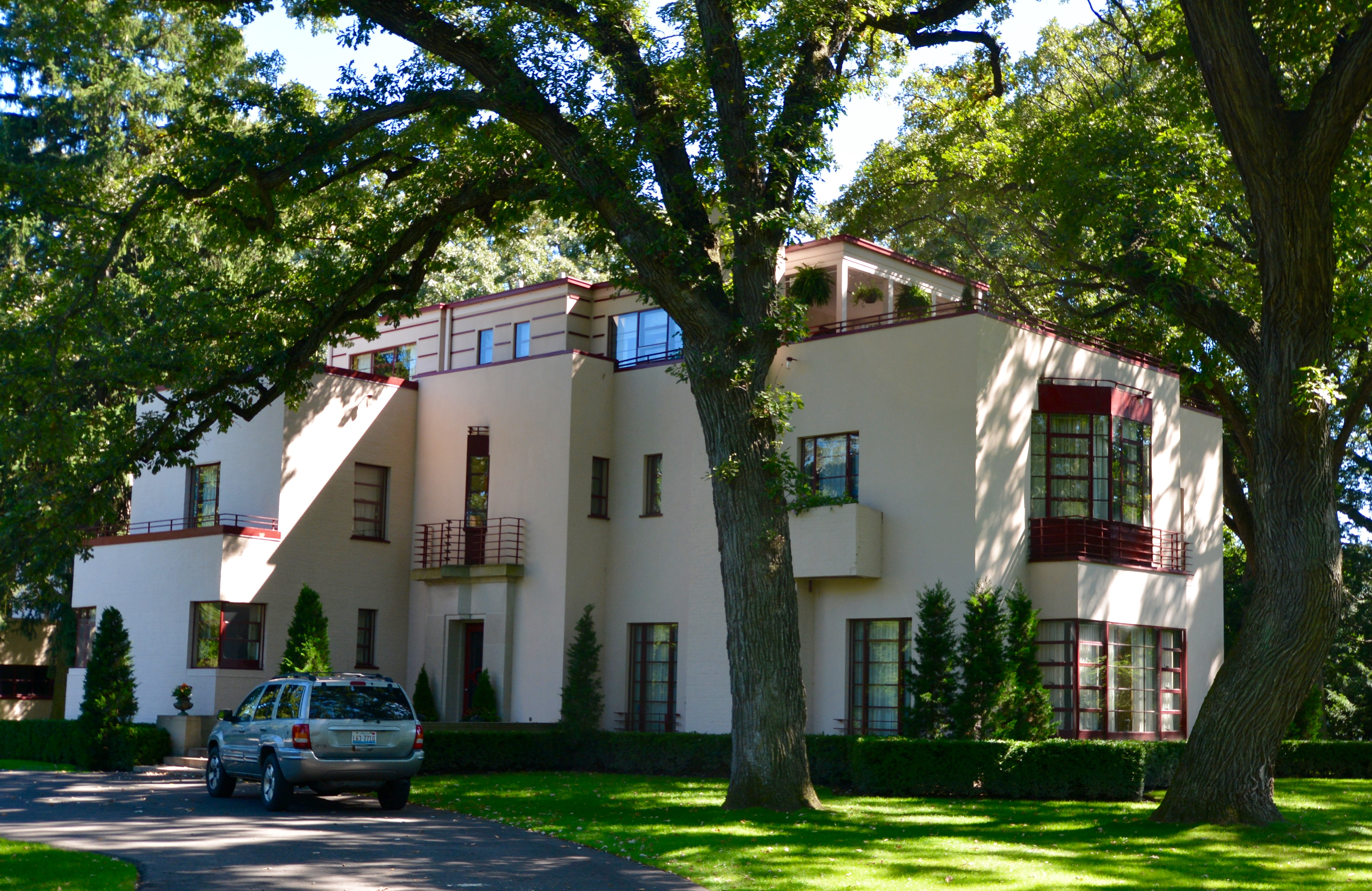

- Location within Chicago metropolitan area Location within Illinois Location within the United States
- Location: 1301 Knollwood Circle, Lake Forest, Illinois
- Coordinates: 42°16′26″N 87°52′44″W
- Area: 2.1 acres (0.85 ha)
- Built: 1932
- Architect: Zimmerman, Saxe & Zimmerman
- Architectural style: Moderne, Art Deco
- NRHP reference No.: 00000947
- Added to NRHP: August 10, 2000

The Robert Hosmer Morse House is a historic house at 1301 Knollwood Circle in Lake Forest, Illinois. Built in 1932, the house served as a summer home for businessman Robert Hosmer Morse and his family. The architectural firm of Zimmerman, Saxe & Zimmerman designed the house, which combined elements of the Moderne and Art Deco styles. As the wealthy residents of Lake Forest typically used traditional designs for their homes, the modern architectural styles were an unusual choice. The house's design features a stucco exterior, a horizontal emphasis throughout, casement windows, decorative limestone around the front entrance, and a recessed third floor.

The house was added to the National Register of Historic Places on August 10, 2000.
