= Justice Morse =

Justice Morse may refer to:

- Allen B. Morse (1837–1921), associate justice of the Michigan Supreme Court
- James L. Morse (1940–2023), associate justice of the Vermont Supreme Court
