= John Morse =

John Morse may refer to:

- John Morse (golfer) (born 1958), American golfer
- John Morse (Colorado politician) (born 1954), former Colorado State Senate president, recalled in 2013
- John Morse (British politician) (born 1951), far right British politician
- John Hollingsworth Morse (1910–1988), film director
- John F. Morse (1801–1884), American politician in Ohio
- John Torrey Morse (1840–1937), American historian and biographer
- John Morse (Massachusetts politician), representative to the Great and General Court
