= Tisdale-Morse House =

Historic house in Massachusetts, United States

- U.S. National Register of Historic Places
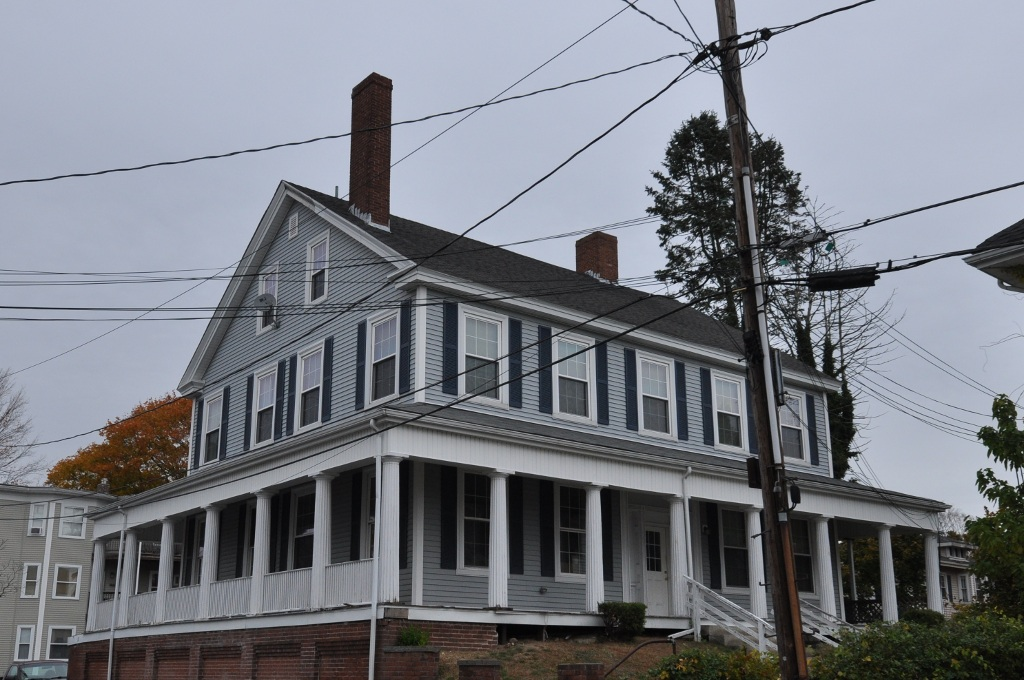

- Location within Massachusetts Location within the United States
- Location: 17 Fayette Pl., Taunton, Massachusetts
- Coordinates: 41°54′15″N 71°5′28″W
- Built: 1835
- Architectural style: Greek Revival
- MPS: Taunton MRA
- NRHP reference No.: 84002231
- Added to NRHP: July 5, 1984

The Tisdale-Morse House is a historic house located at 17 Fayette Place in Taunton, Massachusetts.

== Description and history ==
This large 2 1/2-story, Greek Revival style house was built in 1835 for Samuel Tisdale, and is one of the last surviving estate houses in the city. It originally sat on a large estate, which was held through the 1870s by Lovett Morse, a bank president, before being subdivided for development. The house has a central-hall plan, and is set on a high brick foundation. It has a single-story porch supported by fluted columns, that wraps around two sides. The house has been subdivided into apartments.

The house was listed on the National Register of Historic Places on July 5, 1984.

== See also ==
- National Register of Historic Places listings in Taunton, Massachusetts
