= David Morse (writer) =

David Morse (born 1938) is a British literary author and former lecturer in the School of English and American Studies at the University of Sussex. He was an early authority on Motown but is now best known for his work on Romanticism and the culture and times of the Victorian age. His seminal work, High Victorian Culture, was described by The Times Literary Supplement as ‘an illuminating survey work by a robust and powerful intelligence with an impressive grasp of a great deal of material’.

== Life ==
David Morse was born in 1938 and educated at Bedford Modern School and King's College, Cambridge, where he contributed to Granta, was editor of The Cambridge Review and was awarded an ACLS Fellowship to study American theatre.

Morse became a lecturer in the School of English and American Studies at the University of Sussex. He was an early authority on Motown but is now best known for his work on Romanticism and the culture and times of the Victorian age. His seminal work, High Victorian Culture, was described by The Times Literary Supplement as ‘an illuminating survey work by a robust and powerful intelligence with an impressive grasp of a great deal of material’.

== Selected bibliography ==
- Motown And The Arrival Of Black Music. Published by Macmillan Publishers, New York City, 1971
- Grandfather Rock: The New Poetry And The Old. Published by Delacorte Press, New York City, 1972
- Perspectives On Romanticism: A Transformational Analysis. Published by Barnes & Noble, 1981
- Romanticism: A Structural Analysis. Published by Barnes & Noble, 1982
- American Romanticism. Published by Barnes & Noble, 1987
- American Romanticism. Vol.1, From Cooper To Hawthorne: Excessive America. Published by Macmillan Publishers, London, 1987
- American Romanticism. Vol.2, From Melville To James. Published by Macmillan Publishers, 1987
- England's Time Of Crisis: From Shakespeare To Milton: A Cultural History. Published by St. Martin’s Press, New York City, 1989
- High Victorian Culture. Published by New York University Press, 1993
- The Age Of Virtue: British Culture From The Restoration To Romanticism. Published by St. Martin’s Press, New York City, 2000
