= Amos Morse House =

Historic house in Massachusetts, United States

- U.S. National Register of Historic Places
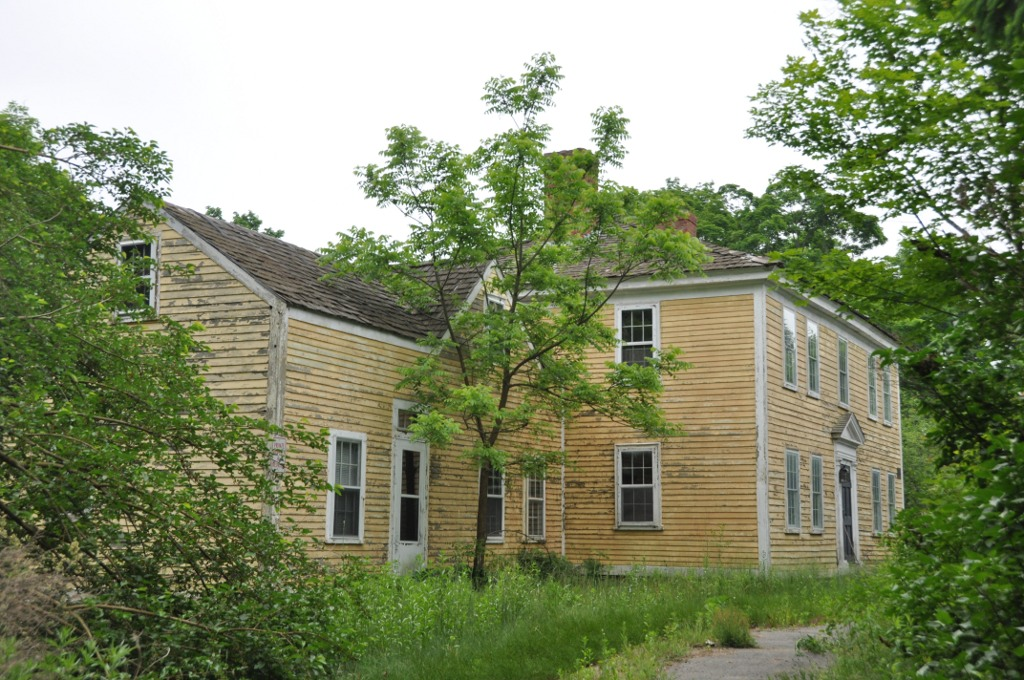

- Location within Massachusetts Location within the United States
- Location: Foxborough, Massachusetts
- Coordinates: 42°5′4″N 71°15′29″W
- Built: 1803
- Architectural style: Federal
- Demolished: December 20, 2019
- NRHP reference No.: 86000027
- Added to NRHP: January 9, 1986

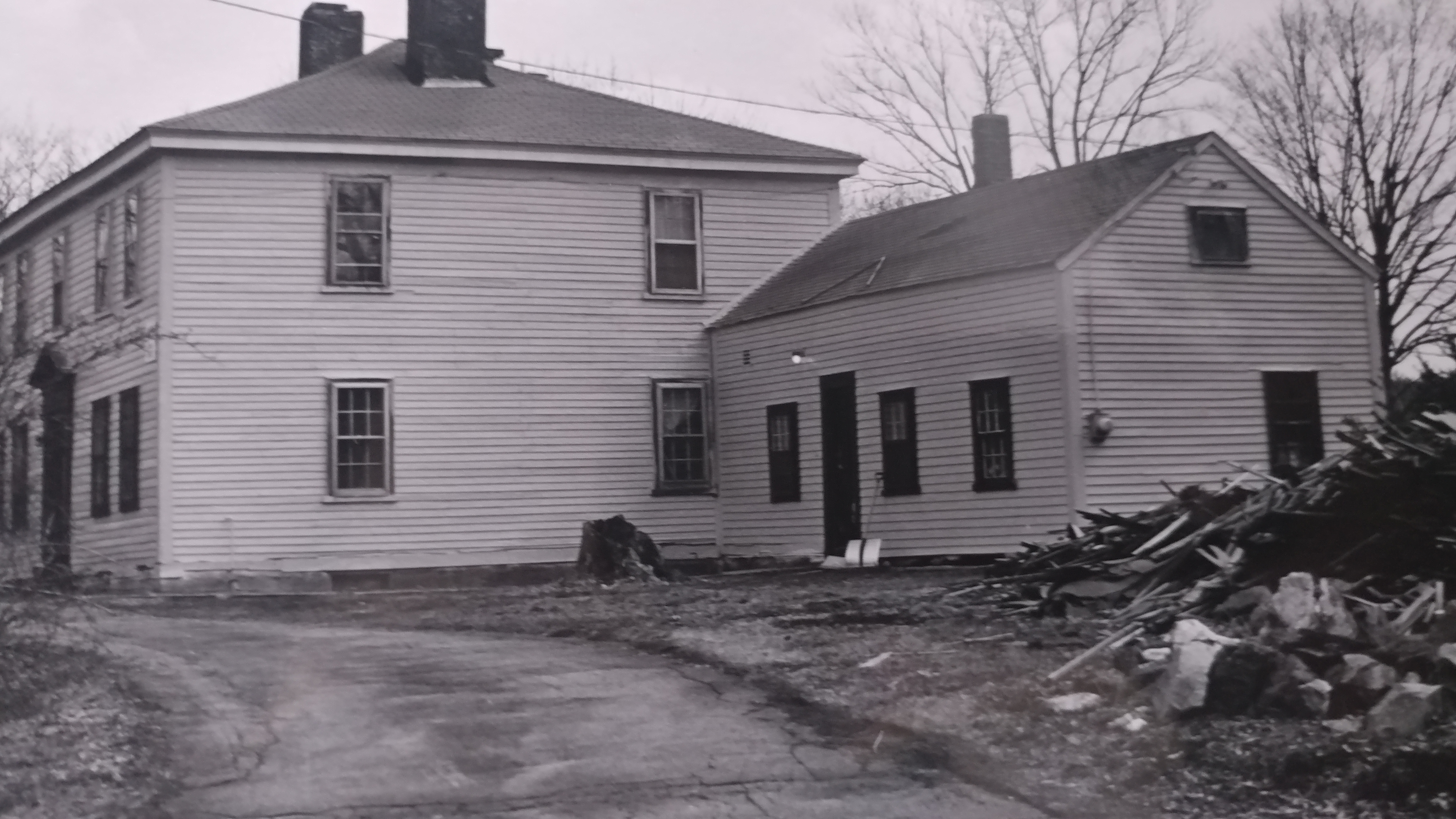
Amos Morse House, as pictured in 1983

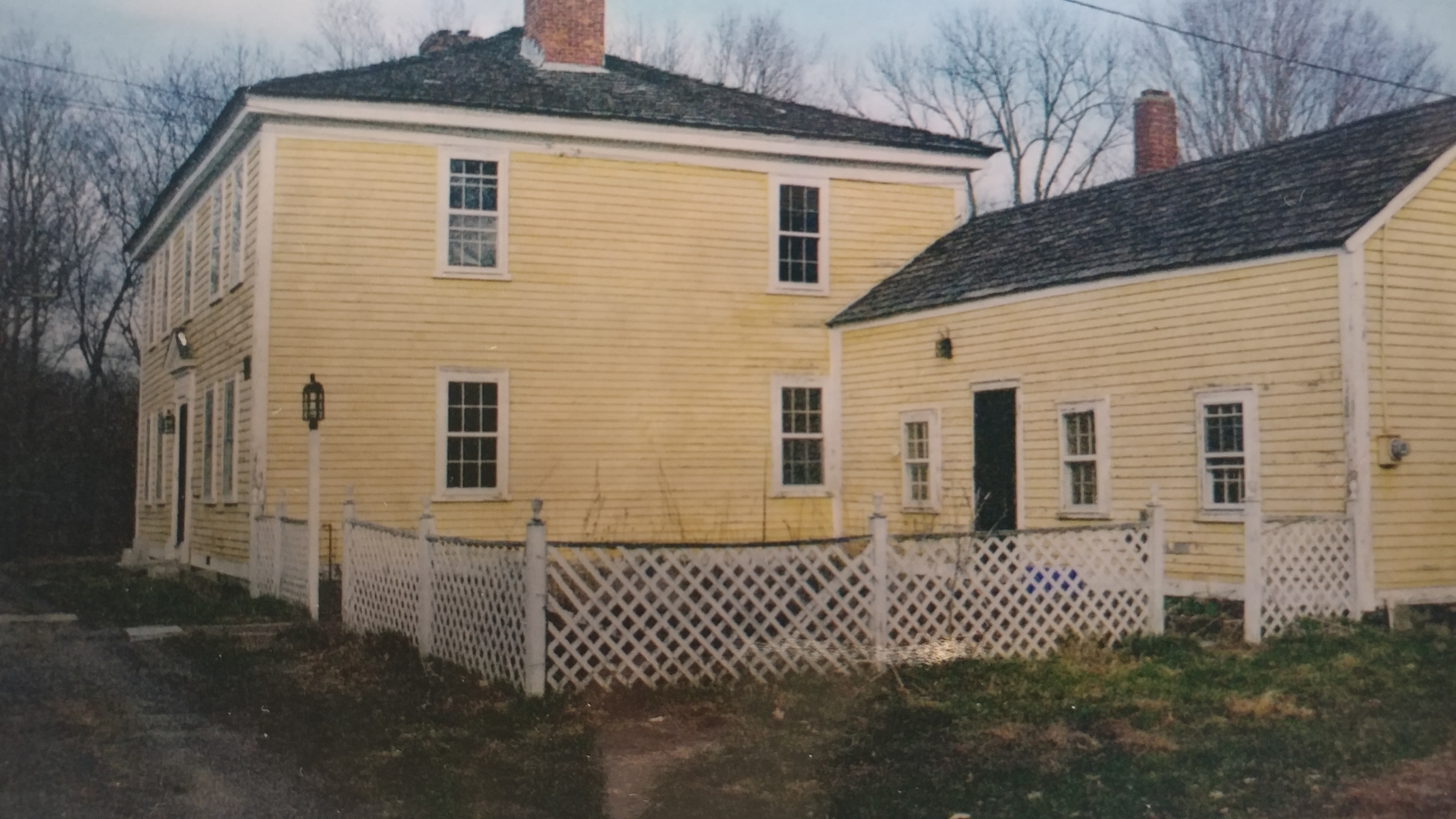
Amos Morse House, west wing, 2003. After being sold to Clinton Recycling.

The Amos Morse House was a historic house at 77 North Street in Foxborough, Massachusetts. It was a two-story wood-frame house, five bays wide, with a hip roof and twin interior chimneys. It was a center entry, Federal Colonial design. It was built circa 1803 by Amos Morse Sr., for his children, Amos Jr. and Sarah. One of its ells was used by the Morses as a shop for producing straw hats, a significant industry in early 19th-century Foxborough.

== Demolition ==
The house was demolished on December 20, 2019. The Kraft Group had purchased the property in 2002 while planning for expansion of the New England Patriots' home stadium. The building fell into disrepair over the years until deemed unsafe by the Kraft Group which announced their intent to demolish the building in late 2018. The town and the Kraft Group sought other alternatives over the years and also during a 6-month moratorium of the demolition, but none was agreed on.

== National Register of Historic Places designation ==
The house was submitted for the National Register of Historic Places in November 1985, by historic preservation consultant Mary Pyne, in conjunction with owners Thomas Deakins and Carol Nathan.

The property description, per the NRHP nomination form:

The Amos Morse house is situated in rural North Foxboro on a partially wooded three-acre site. The house, which faces north, is set back 33 feet from North Street on a low rise. Abutting the lot to the rear (south) is Crack Rock Pond, a man made (1734) pond fed by headwaters of the Neponset River that is today a small part of the Neponset Reservoir system. The tracks of the N.Y., N.H., and Hartford Railroad border the property to the east, while to the west are open fields.

Built circa 1803, the Amos Morse house is an imposing, vernacular example of Federal-period architecture. The building consists of a two-story, hipped roof main block, with symmetrical fenestration, flanked by two asymmetrical 1 1/2 story, gable roofed wings (added circa 1820). A barn and garage, built circa 1848 and 1950, respectively, are located to the south of the house.

Essentially intact, the house retains the integrity of location, design, setting, materials, workmanship, and association. It is one of the few intact Federal-period dwellings of such size and scale in Foxboro, and, with its two prominent linear wings, is an extremely rare building both in Foxboro and in Massachusetts as a whole. The house holds associations with the growth of industry in Foxboro and its evolution from a small, relatively undeveloped agricultural community in the late 18th century to a major regional center for the manufacture of straw goods in the 19th century. The Amos Morse House thus fulfills Criteria A and C of the National Register of Historic Places on the local level.

The house is of wood frame construction, with a clapboard exterior, and rests on a cut granite and fieldstone foundation. Beneath the main block's southwestern corner is a small half cellar.

The five-bay symmetrical facade of the main block is trimmed with plain corner boards and molded cornices. The central entrance has the most important ornamentation on the house and appears to be original: pilasters frame the doorway with a pediment above, and the six-panel door has lights in the top two panels. Simple architrave moldings and window frames enclose double-hung 6/6 sash both on the main elevation and elsewhere throughout the house. Twin interior chimneys pierce the hipped roof: the chimney at the building's western end was rebuilt following a ca. 1880 chimney fire.

The main block's southern elevation has a number of asymmetrically placed windows. There are five simply enframed 6/6 sash windows on the first floor and three on the second, aligned over the first, third, and fourth bays (from left to right). Until the mid 19th century, fenestration was symmetrical, and consisted of only four bays (what is now the fifth bay was at the time empty). At that time, however, the window in the second story's second bay was closed, and a fifth bay was added on the first story. A bulkhead door provides access to the small cellar, which is also lit by a tiny, fixed pane window.

The interior of the house reveals a front-to-back center hallway, double-pile plan. The cornice moldings, fireplace mantels, doors, and hardware confirm the construction date of 1804. Other remaining original features include first and second floor fireplaces, encased corner posts, and wide board floors, The interior of the eastern wing contains an early well which may predate the wing itself.

The structure was built to house two branches of the Morse family. Shortly after the construction of the two wings, the building was remodeled somewhat when the kitchen was moved from the main block to the southwest wing. The ca.1835 alterations are visible in the mantelpiece and panel doors over the beehive oven of the original kitchen.

The vertical board barn, built ca. 1848, is located several feet to the west of the house. It is set into a low rise and rests on a foundation of cut granite.

The house was accepted on the National Register of Historic Places in 1986.

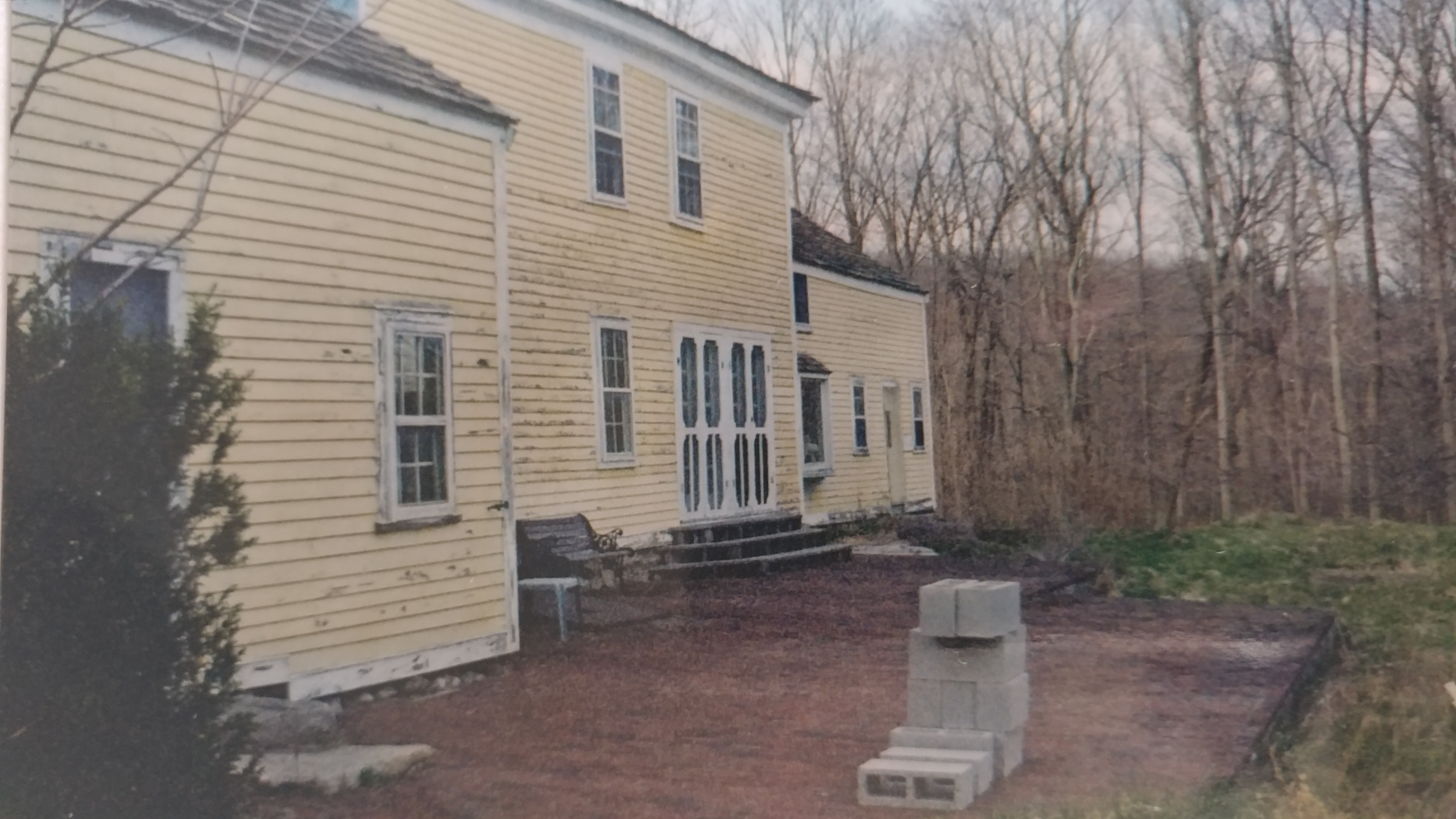
Amos Morse House, 2003. After being sold to Clinton Recycling.

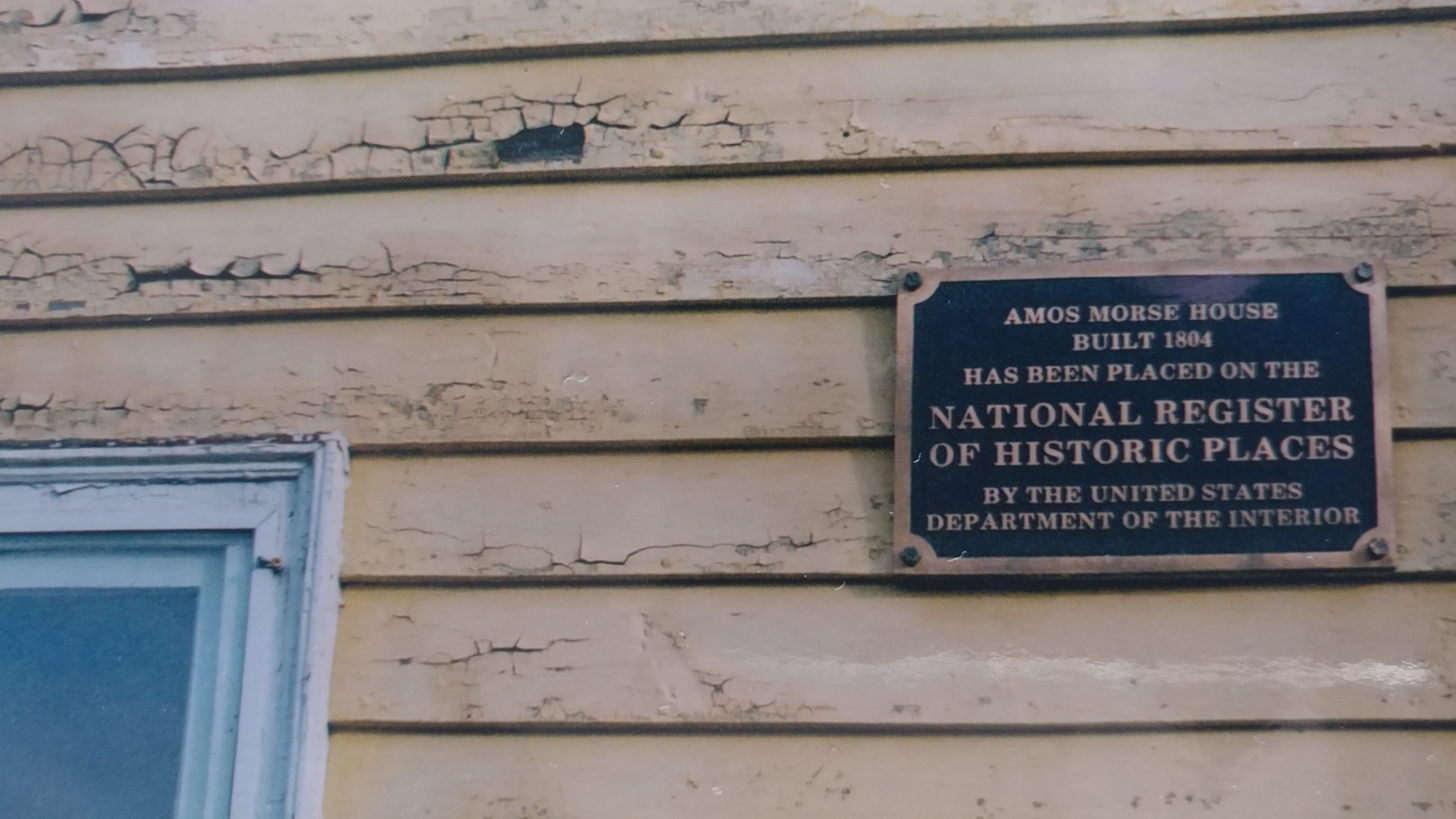
Amos Morse House, 2003. After being sold to Clinton Recycling.

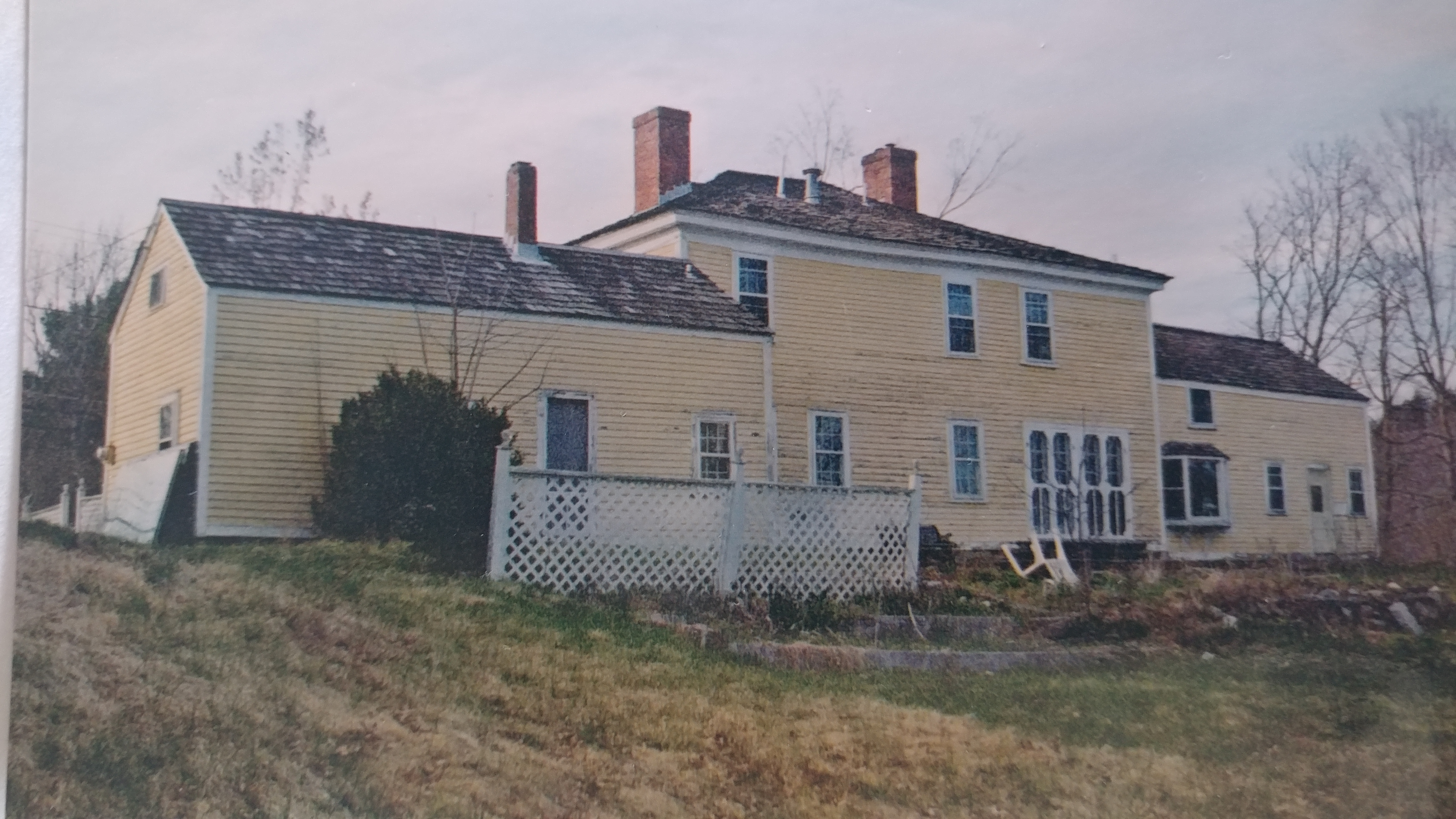
Amos Morse House, 2003. After being sold to Clinton Recycling.

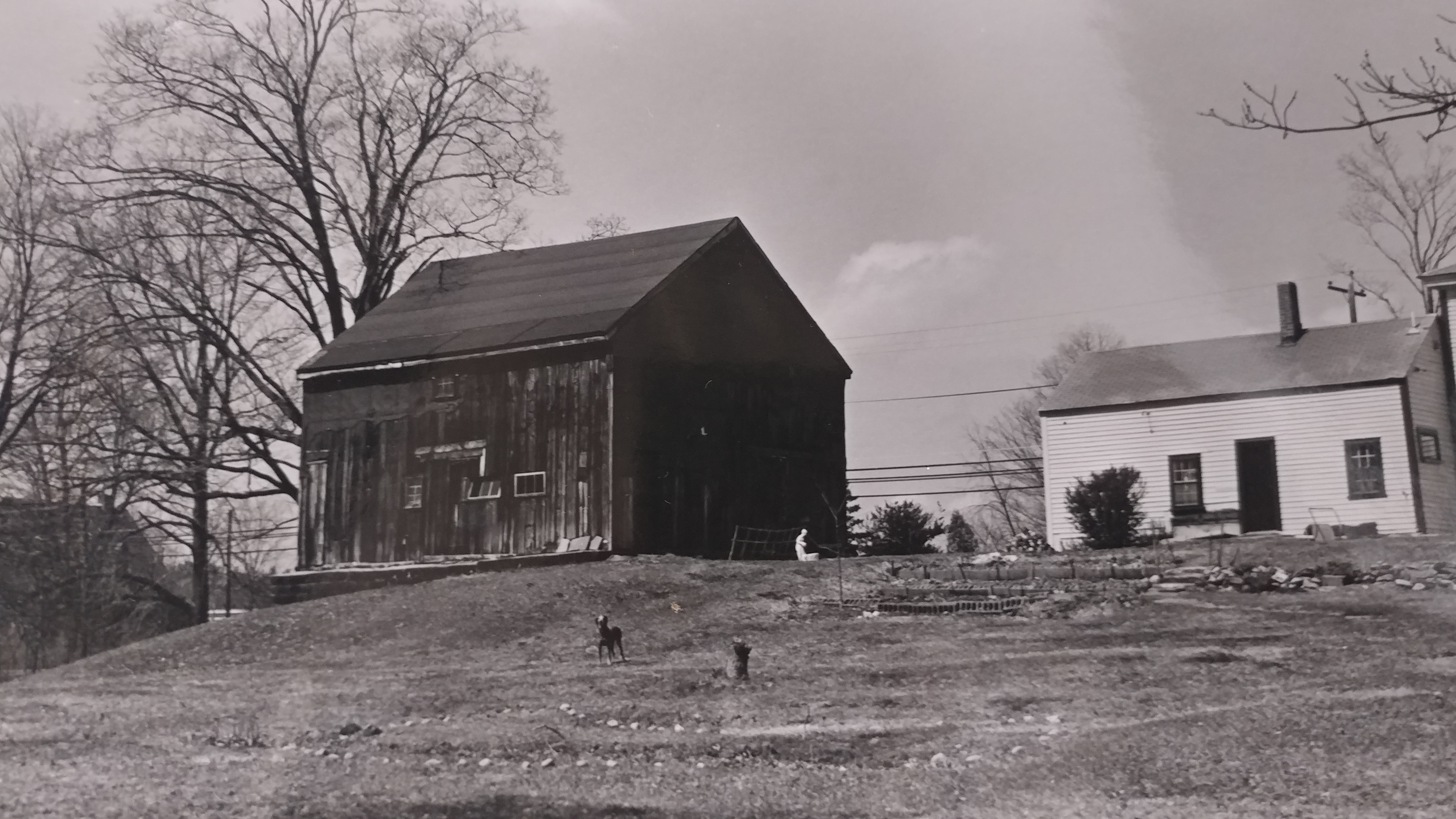
Amos Morse House, west wing and 1848 barn. Original Nat. Reg. photograph.

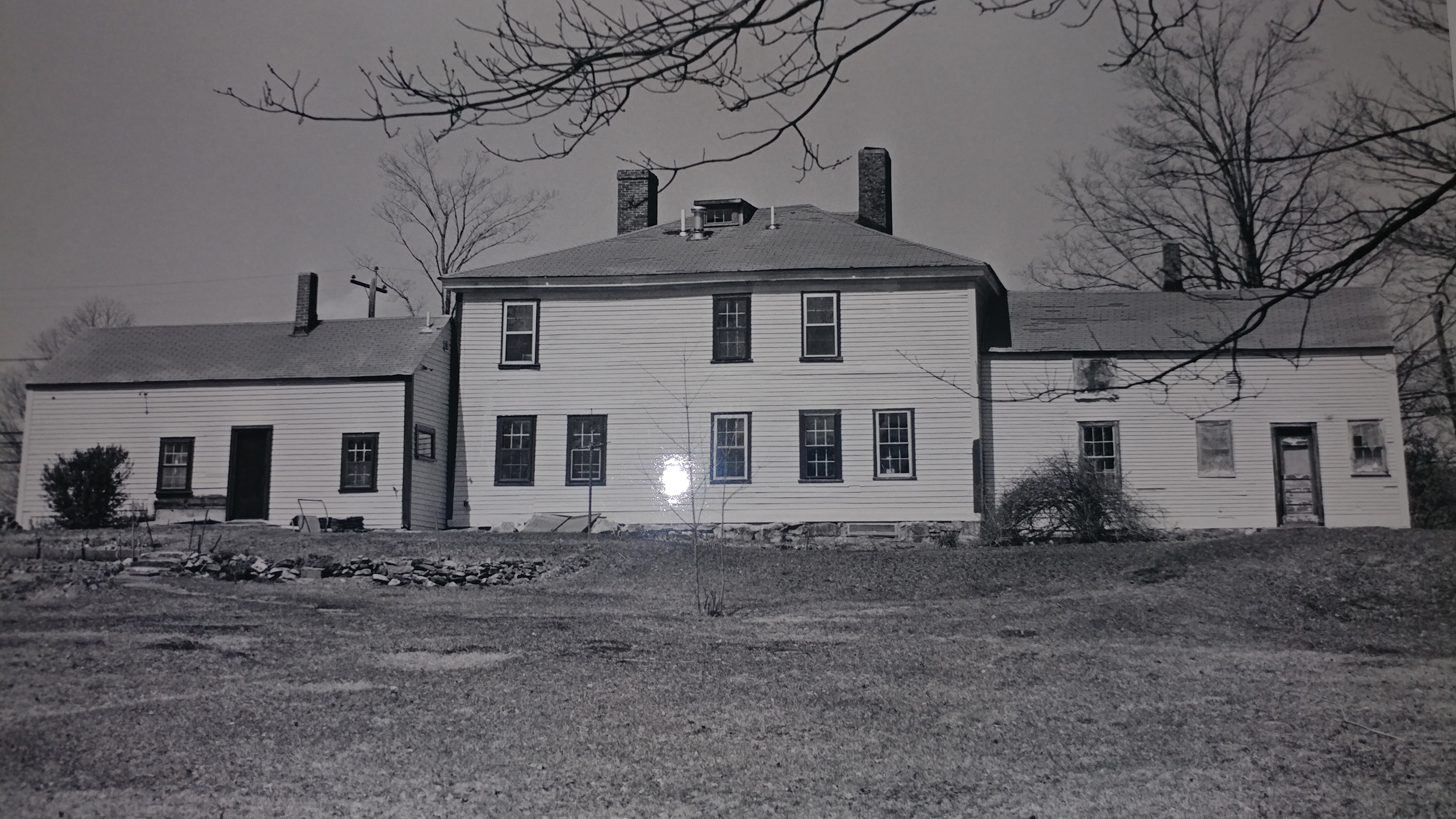
Amos Morse House, rear as pictured in 1983. Original Nat. Reg. photograph.

== See also ==
- National Register of Historic Places listings in Norfolk County, Massachusetts
