= Hastings-Morse House =

Historic house in Massachusetts, United States

- U.S. National Register of Historic Places
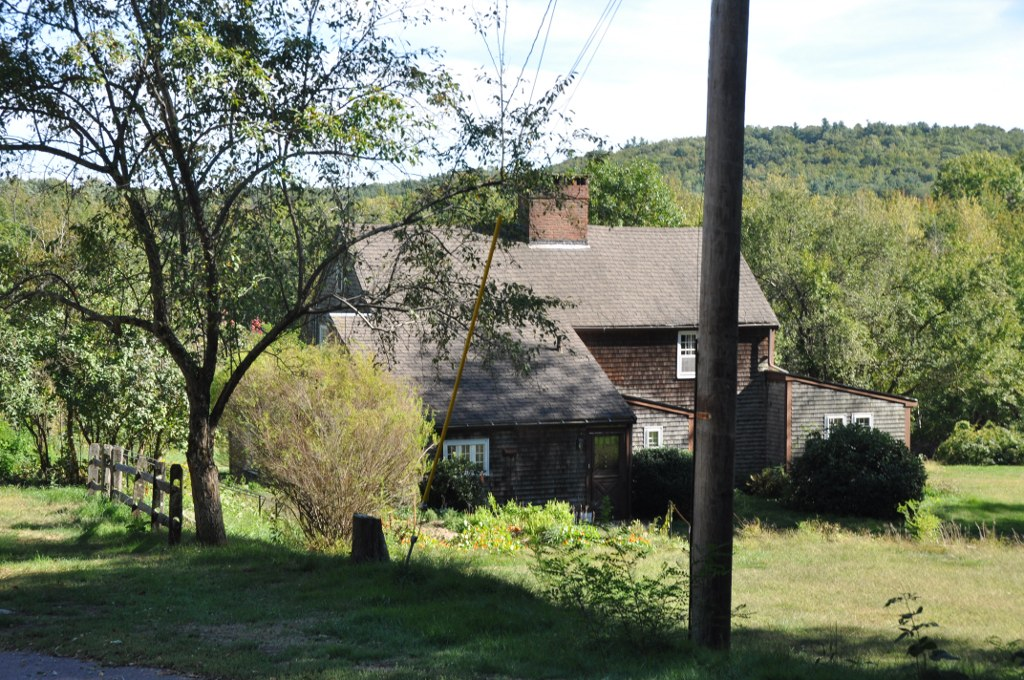
- View of the rear of the house

- Location within Massachusetts Location within the United States
- Location: 595 E. Broadway, Haverhill, Massachusetts
- Coordinates: 42°47′51″N 71°1′4″W
- Built: 1706
- Architectural style: Colonial
- MPS: First Period Buildings of Eastern Massachusetts TR
- NRHP reference No.: 90000225
- Added to NRHP: March 14, 1991

The Hastings-Morse House is a historic First Period house in Haverhill, Massachusetts. The oldest portion of the 2 1/2-story wood-frame house, its central chimney and right-side rooms, were probably built c. 1706 by a man named Hastings. Left-side rooms and a partial leanto section on the back of the house were added during the 18th century. The house underwent a major restoration in the late 1957, which included raising the roof on the leanto section. Another 20th-century addition is the sunroom on the left (west) side of the house. Evidence of the building's First Period origins is still visible in the right front room.

The house was added to the National Register of Historic Places in 1991.

== See also ==
- National Register of Historic Places listings in Essex County, Massachusetts
