= Morse High School =

Morse High School is the name of several high schools:

- Morse High School (California) San Diego, California
- Morse High School (Maine) Bath, Maine
