= Morse Farm =

Morse Farm may refer to:

- Asa Morse Farm, a historic farmstead in Dublin, New Hampshire
- Eli Morse Farm, a historic farm in Dublin, New Hampshire
- Morse Farm (Moravia, New York), a historic farm in Moravia, New York
- Capt. Thomas Morse Farm, a farmhouse in Dublin, New Hampshire
- Wayne Morse Family Farm, a park and former home of former senator Wayne Morse in Eugene, Oregon
