= Colin Morse =

Australian rules footballer

Personal information
- Full name: Colin Morse
- Born: 29 June 1955 (age 71)
- Original team: Latrobe (NWFU)

Playing career^{1}
Years	Club	Games (Goals)
1973–74	Collingwood	4 (0)
- ^{1} Playing statistics correct to the end of 1974.

Colin Morse (born 29 June 1955) is a former Australian rules footballer who played with Collingwood in the Victorian Football League (VFL).
