= Frank C. Morse =

American politician

- Born: April 8, 1859; Mare Island, in California
- Died: after 1923
- Education: St. Augustine College, Benicia, California (1874 – 1877)
- Occupations: Postmaster of Colfax, Washington; Washington state bookkeeper; state tax commission secretary; assistant commissioner of public lands; state board of control member; deportation agent in Fort Steilacoom
- Known for: A Washington State pioneer who lived and contributed to the cities of Colfax, Tacoma and Olympia. Over the years, occupied multiple official positions such as Colfax postmaster, Washington state bookkeeper, and tax commission secretary. Was a member of the State Board of Control.
- Political party: Republican
- Spouse: Mary Isabelle Sullivan(married in 1887)
- Children: 1
- Parents: Charles A. Morse (father); Caroline M. Sawyer (mother)

Frank C. Morse (April 8, 1859–after 1923) was a Washington state pioneer and state official. Morse was one of the first inhabitants of Colfax, Washington, coming to the small village in 1879 or 1880. He worked in the Lippitt Brothers trade company for ten years, but later changed his career path to occupy a number of official positions. He was appointed as postmaster of Colfax by President Harrison, and spent a few years as an assistant postmaster in Tacoma.

Morse lived in Olympia for many years. In Olympia, he served as the state bookkeeper, secretary of the state tax commission, assistant state commissioner of public lands, and a member of the management board for the Monroe State Reformatory. In 1913 he became the only Republican member of the State Board of Control. He served at the position from 1913 to 1916, resigning before his term expired. From 1919 until at least 1923, he worked in Fort Steilacoom as a deportation agent for non-resident insane, and was state asylums inspector.

== Early life, family, and education ==
Frank Morse was born on April 8, 1859, on Mare Island in California, where the Navy shipyard was located. He spent all his life in the Western United States. Growing up at the Navy yard, Morse witnessed preparation for war and the troop homecomings.

Morse's father, Charles A. Morse, came to San Francisco in 1856, appointed by President Lincoln to work as a Naval storekeeper on the Navy yard. Charles married Caroline M. Sawyer from Haverhill, Massachusetts. Charles died in San Francisco in 1889, and Carilone died in Alameda, California in 1901. Several generations of the family lived in America, but their earlier ancestors were from England and Ireland.

Frank Morse attended St. Augustine College in Benicia, California. He studied there from 1874 to 1877.

== Career ==
Morse's first job was with Californian agency for the Centemerie kid gloves, made in Paris. He worked at the agency for a little over a year.

=== States of Oregon and Washington ===
In 1879, Morse moved to Portland, Oregon, where he lived for seven months. Later, he relocated to Colfax, Washington, a recently founded village. In Colfax, Morse worked for the Lippitt Brothers merchants for ten years.

In May 1889, Morse was appointed postmaster of Colfax by President Harrison. He worked at the position for five years. Afterwards, Morse became state bookkeeper, placed in the position by State Auditor Grimes under the management of Governor McGraw. Upon acquiring the position, Morse moved to Olympia and served there for three years.

In 1897, Morse moved to Tacoma. On September 17, 1899, he became assistant postmaster, working for John B. Cromwell.

=== Olympia ===
By 1908, Morse was back to Olympia, working as the secretary of the state tax commission. That year, he was offered a position of assistant state commissioner of public lands, and worked there under Commissioner E. W. Ross until 1913.

During the State Board of Control reorganization in 1913, Morse succeeded A. E. Cagwin to the Republican membership. He became the only Republican member of the board; the law required that the board was bipartisan and that the minority party was represented by one member. Morse began the position on June 11, 1913. The same year, he was a member of the management board for the Monroe State Reformatory.

Morse resigned from the State Board of Control before his term expired. He left the office on December 31, 1916 and was succeeded by George Dowe McQuesten.

=== State deportation agency ===
In 1919, Morse was appointed to another state position: a deportation agent working with cases of non-resident insane. After World War I, state government planned to "enter upon a vigorous policy" of sending people back to their native countries. Morse worked as a state deportation agent in Fort Steilacoom until at least 1923. He was also an inspector for state asylums at the time.

Over the years in multiple official positions, Morse was known as a "very competent" specialist.

== Personal life ==
In 1887, Morse married Mary Isabelle Sullivanin in Lewiston, Idaho. She was a sister of Judge Sullivan from Spokane and of Hon. P. C. Sullivan, a politician who was once a candidate for the position of Washington State governor.

The Morses had one child, who died at the age of two. The family lived in their home in Tacoma until their move to Olympia.

== See also ==
- Mare Island Naval Shipyard
- Colfax, Washington
- Fort Steilacoom

== Literature cited ==
- "All over the great state", Spokane Chronicle, Spokane: Cowles Company, p. 18, November 27, 1908, LCCN sn86072020, OCLC 14374699
- Scripps, Edward, ed. (April 13, 1910), "Morse denies land fraud charge", The Tacoma Times, Tacoma: E. W. Scripps Company, p. 6, ISSN 2158-4729, LCCN sn88085187, OCLC 17347623
- "Morse named on board of control", Spokane Chronicle, Spokane: Cowles Company, p. 21, May 30, 1913, LCCN sn86072020, OCLC 14374699
- "Washington brieflets", Lynden Tribune, vol. 5, no. 50, Lynden: Tribune Pub. Co., p. 5, June 5, 1913, ISSN 2328-3963, LCCN sn88085445, OCLC 17398139
- Murphy, John Miller, ed. (June 6, 1913), "More new appointees", The Washington Standard, Olympia: McClatchy, p. 1, ISSN 2379-7339, LCCN sn84022770, OCLC 10580261
- "Pete's missing relatives found", Seattle Daily Times, Seattle: The Seattle Times Company, p. 16, September 1, 1916, ISSN 2639-4898, LCCN sn86072007, OCLC 1765328
- Scripps, Edward, ed. (December 28, 1916), "Morse quits", The Tacoma Times, Tacoma: E. W. Scripps Company, p. 5, ISSN 2158-4729, LCCN sn88085187, OCLC 17347623
- "Tacoma man succeeds Morse", The Spokesman-Review, Spokane: Cowles Company, p. 1, December 31, 1916, ISSN 1064-7317, LCCN sn84024754, OCLC 11102610
- Murphy, John Miller, ed. (March 30, 1917), "Governor appoints woman regent of university", The Washington Standard, Olympia: McClatchy, p. 5, ISSN 2379-7339, LCCN sn84022770, OCLC 10580261
- Murphy, John Miller, ed. (August 22, 1919), "Morse deportation agent", The Washington Standard, Olympia: McClatchy, p. 3, ISSN 2379-7339, LCCN sn84022770, OCLC 10580261
- "Views state hospitals; Morse leaves for coast", Spokane Chronicle, Spokane: Cowles Company, p. 17, March 29, 1923, LCCN sn86072020, OCLC 14374699
- "State deports nineteen patients in asylums", Seattle Daily Times, Seattle: The Seattle Times Company, p. 17, May 20, 1923, ISSN 2639-4898, LCCN sn86072007, OCLC 1765328
- Durham, Nelson Wayne (1912), History of the City of Spokane and Spokane Country, Washington: From its earliest settlement to the present time, Library of American civilization, Chicago: The S. J. Clarke publishing company, LCCN 14013593, OCLC 11041789
- Prosser, William Farrand (1903), Lewis, Edward Gardner (ed.), A history of the Puget Sound country, its resources, its commerce and its people, New York City: Edward Gardner Lewis, LCCN 05013767
