= Asa Morse Farm =

Historic house in New Hampshire, United States

- U.S. National Register of Historic Places
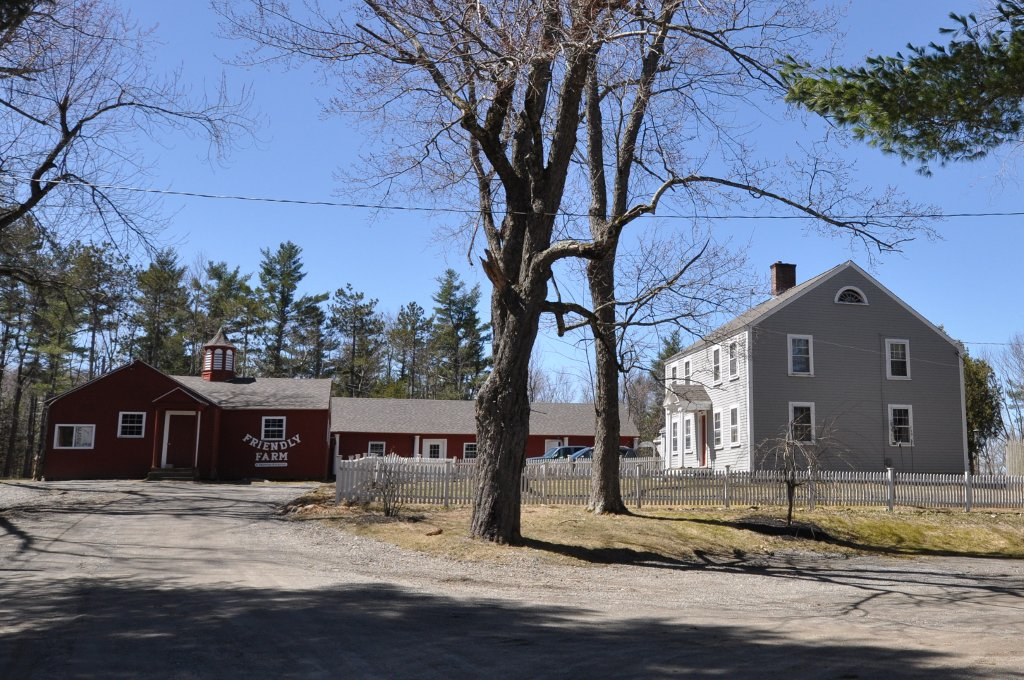

- Location within New Hampshire Location within the United States
- Location: NH 101, Dublin, New Hampshire
- Coordinates: 42°54′47″N 72°5′39″W
- Area: 4.3 acres (1.7 ha)
- Built: 1926
- Architect: Norton & Townsend
- Architectural style: Colonial Revival
- MPS: Dublin MRA
- NRHP reference No.: 83004054
- Added to NRHP: December 15, 1983

The Asa Morse Farm, also known as the Friendly Farm, is a historic farmstead on New Hampshire Route 101 in Dublin, New Hampshire. The main farmhouse, built in 1926 on the foundations of an early 19th-century house, is a good example of Colonial Revival architecture, built during Dublin's heyday as a summer retreat. The farmstead was listed on the National Register of Historic Places in 1983.

== Description and history ==
The Asa Morse Farm is located a short way west of Dublin Pond, on the south side of NH 101 east of its junction with MacVeagh Road. The farm complex includes the main house, barn, and cottage. All three buildings were constructed in 1926, the house upon the foundation of the early 19th-century farmhouse of Asa Morse. It was built for Frederick Brewster as part of his summer estate and gentleman's farm, which he had established on a farm-estate property first developed as a summer estate in 1889. The property was revived as an agricultural property in the 1960s; the cottage now serves as a chicken house.

The farmhouse is a modest but well-executed example of Colonial Revival architecture. It is a 2 1/2-story wood-frame structure, with a gabled roof and clapboarded exterior. It has a central chimney, and its main facade is five bays wide with a center entrance. The entrance is sheltered by a gabled portico supported by paired Federal-style columns.

== See also ==
- National Register of Historic Places listings in Cheshire County, New Hampshire
