= Edward Morse (cricketer) =

English cricketer

Personal information
- Full name: Edward James Morse
- Born: 30 January 1986 (age 40); Stevenage, Hertfordshire, England
- Batting: Right-handed
- Bowling: Right-arm fast-medium

Domestic team information
- Years: Team
- 2004–2005: Hertfordshire
- 2005–2008: Oxford UCCE
- 2005–2008: Oxford University

Career statistics
Competition	First-class
Matches	12
Runs scored	69
Batting average	8.62
100s/50s	–/–
Top score	36
Balls bowled	1,758
Wickets	29
Bowling average	26.37
5 wickets in innings	2
10 wickets in match	–
Best bowling	6/102
Catches/stumpings	4/–
- Source: Cricinfo, 1 July 2019

Edward James Morse (born 30 January 1986) is an English former first-class cricketer.

Morse was born at Stevenage in January 1986. While studying at St Edmund Hall, he made his debut in first-class cricket for Oxford UCCE against Lancashire at Oxford in 2005. He played seven further first-class matches for Oxford UCCE, the last coming in 2008. He also played in four University Matches for Oxford University against Cambridge University between 2005–08. With his right-arm fast-medium bowling, he took 29 wickets at an average of 36.37, with best figures of 6 for 102. One of two five wicket hauls he took, these figures came for Oxford University against Cambridge University in 2008. In addition to playing first-class, Morse also played minor counties cricket for Hertfordshire, making two appearances in the Minor Counties Championship in 2004 and 2005.
