= Morse Field =

Morse Field may refer to:

- Morse Field, the field at Alfond Stadium (University of Maine)
- Morse Field (Hawaii), a former military airfield near Naʻālehu, Hawaii
