= Moscow-Pullman Daily News =

American newspaper

Coordinates: 46.7313°N 116.9993°W

- Type: Daily newspaper
- Format: Broadsheet
- Owner: TPC Publishing/A. L. Alford Jr.
- Publisher: Nathan Alford
- Editor: Nathan Alford
- Managing editor: Matt Baney
- Founded: 1911, 1882
- Language: English
- Headquarters: 220 East Fifth Street; Suite 314; Moscow, Idaho, U.S.
- Circulation: 5,100
- Sister newspapers: Lewiston Tribune
- ISSN: 1061-8597
- OCLC number: 1526508548
- Website: dnews.com

The Moscow-Pullman Daily News is a daily newspaper in the northwestern United States, serving the Moscow, Idaho, and Pullman, Washington, metropolitan area. The two cities on the Palouse are the homes of the two states' land grant universities, the University of Idaho and Washington State University.

== History ==
The newspaper has been published continuously in Moscow for 115 years, since September 28, 1911. It began as the Daily Star-Mirror, which started as the Moscow Mirror in 1882 and the North Idaho Star in 1887, with a merger in 1905. A final intracity competitor was gained with the arrival of Frank B. Robinson's Moscow News Review, which began in 1933 and went to daily publication in September 1935. The two papers merged in November 1939 and ran briefly under a lengthy combined name, then became the Daily Idahonian.

The Palouse Empire News for Whitman County was added in 1984 and later became the Daily News. Later in the 1980s the paper was acquired by Kerns-Tribune of Salt Lake City, Utah. The Idahonian and the Daily News were merged in late 1991 and became the Moscow-Pullman Daily News. Kerns-Tribune was acquired by TCI in 1997; all the company's papers except The Salt Lake Tribune were acquired by A.L. Alford Jr. the following year.

For decades the newspaper's facilities were at 409 South Jackson Street. After printing operations moved south to Lewiston, it downsized its headquarters in Moscow in 2013 and moved three blocks east, to the federal building. In 2023, the Moscow office was closed

In 2020, the newspaper eliminated its Monday print edition. In 2024, the newspaper reduced the number of print editions to two a week, Thursdays and Saturdays. The paper also switched from carrier to postal delivery.

== Notable employees ==
The first editor of the Moscow Mirror was Willis Sweet (1856–1925), Idaho's first elected congressman following statehood in 1890. He had come to Moscow after learning the printer's trade in Nebraska; he was later an attorney, judge, and territorial supreme court justice. Sweet was instrumental in obtaining the University of Idaho for Moscow and was the first president of its board of regents (1889–1893).

Tom McCall (1913–1983), governor of Oregon (1967–1975), was a young reporter in Moscow for five years (1937–1942) for the News-Review and the Daily Idahonian.
