= Arthur D. Morse =

American author and journalist (1920–1971)

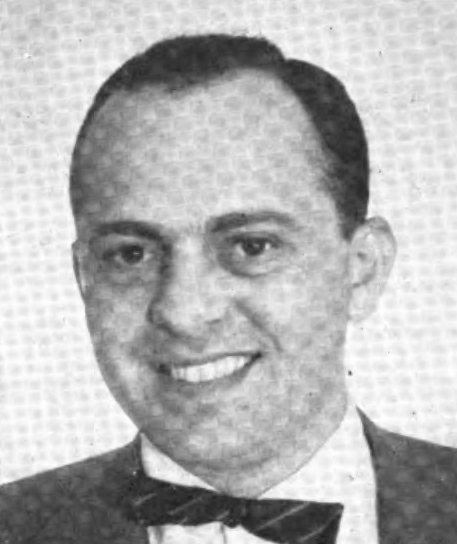
Morse c. 1954

Arthur David Morse (December 27, 1920 – June 1, 1971) was an American author and television producer for the Columbia Broadcasting System (CBS) and a World War II historian. As a journalist, he worked both in print and television and concerned himself with investigating the social issues of his day. As an author, he is best known for While Six Million Died: A Chronicle of American Apathy (1968), his book concerning the inaction and disregard of the United States government, especially the State Department, for the genocide of the Jews of Europe during the Second World War.

== Early life and education ==
Morse was born in Brooklyn, New York, the son of Frank and Henrietta Moskowitz. He was educated at the University of Virginia. During the Second World War, he served as an officer in the United States Navy, reaching the rank of lieutenant.

== Career ==
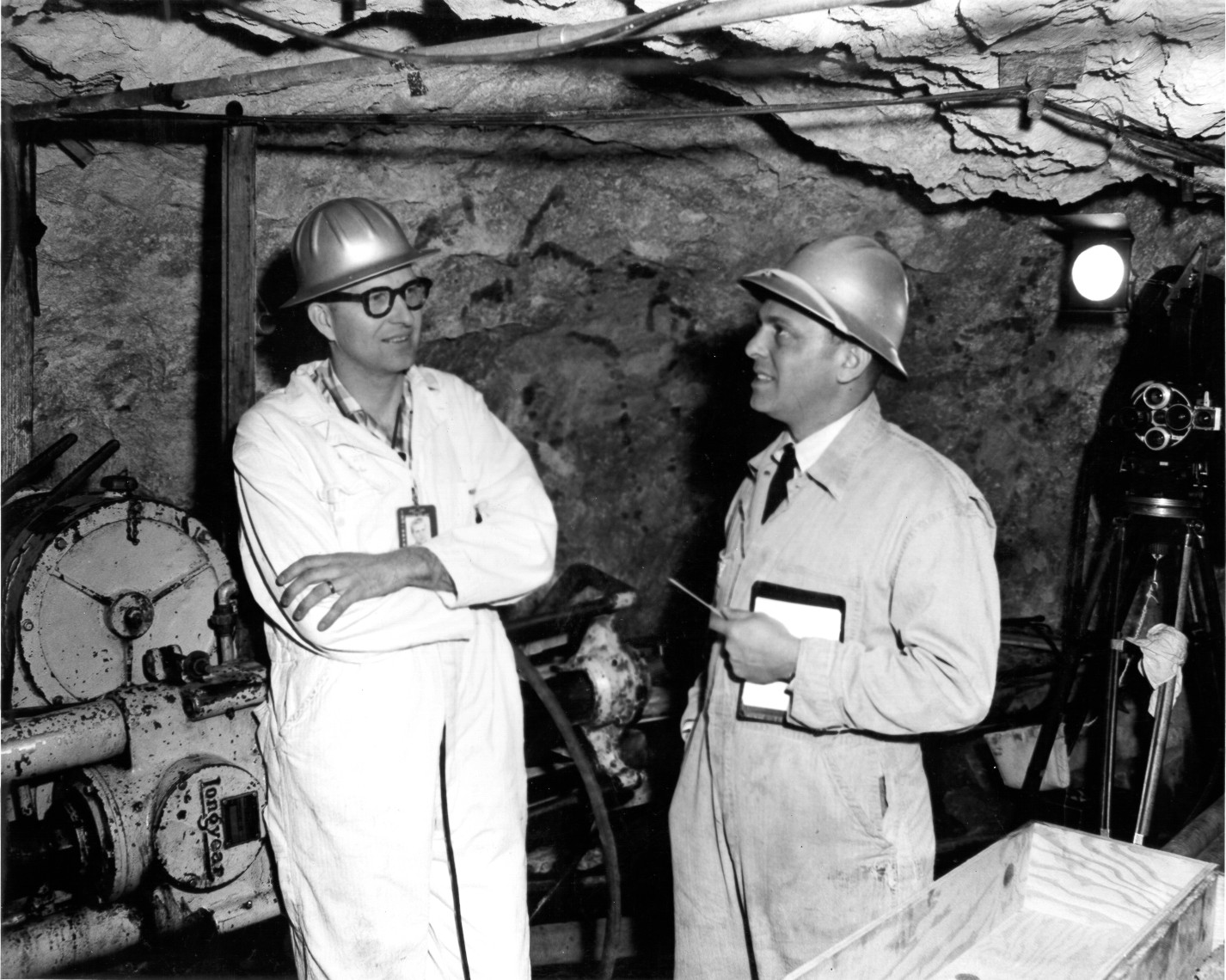
Arthur D. Morse (right) in 1957 conducting an interview for the CBS Program See It Now.

Morse began his career as a freelance writer for national magazines, such as Harper's Bazaar and he won recognition in this field, including the Sigma Delta Chi's annual award for "distinguished public service journalism".

In 1953, he joined CBS News and became a reporter- director for Edward R. Murrow's See It Now television series. He was a producer-writer for CBS television documentaries on major American social issues during the 1950s and 1960s, such as the first presentation of the cigarette-lung cancer connection and public school desegregation.

His work as a series writer, producer or executive producer included "CBS Reports", "Who Speaks for the South", "Clinton and the Law", and others. "The Lost Class of '59" directed by Morse and presented by Edward R. Murrow surveyed the civil rights issues involved in educating children and examined more closely the issues of integration in Norfolk, Virginia. His documentaries won recognition such as the Peabody awards.

Morse resigned from CBS in 1965 to write While Six Million Died, which was published in 1968. In 1969, he helped found the International Broadcast Institute (IBI), headquartered in Rome, and served as its executive director.

== Published works ==
Morse was the author of several books on the social issues of his time, such as Schools of Tomorrow — Today published by Doubleday in 1960 and covering diverse topics such as team teaching and summer programs for gifted students.

Morse's best selling book, While Six Million Died: A Chronicle of American Apathy, published in 1968 by Random House, concerns the controversy over the United States and Allied response to the Holocaust during the Second World War. Morse indicts the Roosevelt administration, and particularly the US State Department and certain officials in it responsible for refugee and Jewish affairs, for failing to act when there was a possibility of rescuing substantial numbers of Jews from annihilation by the Nazis during the Holocaust.

In this book, Morse details the events leading to the submission of a report to President Roosevelt by Secretary of the Treasury Henry Morgenthau Jr., originally titled "Acquiescence of this Government in the Murder of the Jews", which criticized the State Department for having delayed for five months a proposal to negotiate with the Nazis for the release of thousands of Jews in France and Romania. The report finally motivated Roosevelt to approve the creation of a War Refugee Board to aid civilian victims of the Nazi and Axis powers.

Morse drew on his background as an investigative journalist to conduct research and obtain extension documentation from recently declassified and unpublished official papers, diplomatic and personal correspondence in the National Archives and archives in several countries, and interview participants to substantiate the contentions of his book.

Morse contended that Secretary of State Cordell Hull and several State Department officials, including Assistant Secretary Breckinridge Long, and Foreign Service officer Robert Borden Reams, in charge of the so-called "Jewish question" in the State Department's Division of European Affairs, consistently delayed, obstructed or opposed efforts to save Jews from the Nazis in Europe, or to admit them as refugees into the United States. As one example, he cites that as early as August 1942, Gerhart Riegner, a representative of the World Jewish Congress in Geneva received information from a reliable German source that Hitler had ordered the extermination of all the Jews in Europe, and reported it to the U.S. Consulate in Geneva. The State Department did not act upon this information or transmit the message to American Jewish leaders as Riegner had requested.

Morse further criticized President Roosevelt for abdicating moral leadership on the issue until Morgenthau's report forced his hand in 1944. He also criticized the British for supporting the rescue of European Jews while keeping Mandatory Palestine closed to refugees, and Pope Pius XII for his public silence in the face of the information about the genocide taking place that was made known to him too.

== Death and legacy ==
Morse died June 1, 1971, as a result of a motor vehicle accident in which he was a passenger, while attending a conference in Yugoslavia on "The New Frontiers of Television."

His personal papers are archived at the New York Public Library and cover the topics that concerned his television and writing career, including education, nutrition, public health, and the Holocaust, particularly in regards to Jewish refugees and the United States War Refugee Board.
