= Emma Huntington Nason =

American poet (1845–1921)

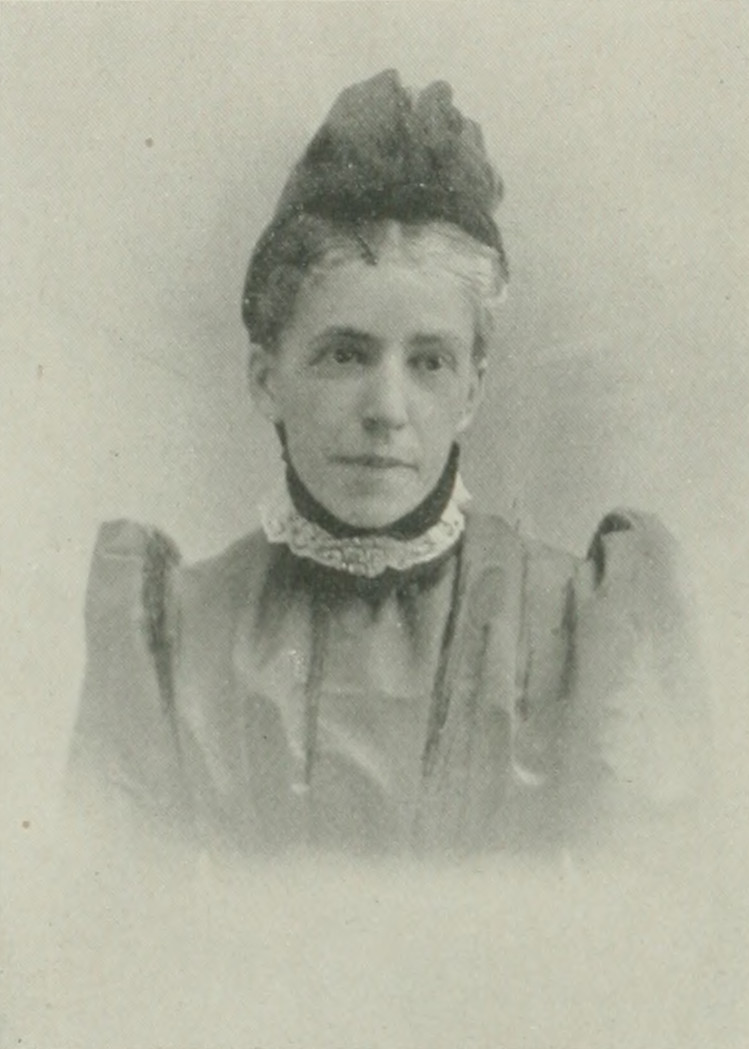
- Photo in A Woman of the Century
- Born: August 6, 1845; Hallowell, Maine, U.S.
- Died: January 11, 1921 (aged 75); Augusta, Maine, U.S.
- Resting place: Hallowell Village Cemetery, Hallowell, Maine, U.S.
- Education: Maine Wesleyan Seminary (now Kents Hill School)
- Occupations: poet; author; musical composer
- Spouse: Charles H. Nason (m. 1870; died 1918)
- Children: Arthur Huntington Nason
- Parents: Samuel W. Huntington; Sally Mayo
- Relatives: John Mayo
- Writing career
- Pen name: John G. Andrews

Emma Huntington Nason (née, Huntington; pen name, John G. Andrews; August 6, 1845 – January 11, 1921) was an American poet, author, and musical composer. When only twelve years old, she began to write in verse. She devoted much time to literature, art and music, in each of which she excelled. Her works included, My Ancestors; Address and poem at the dedication of the Hallowell library, March 9, 1880 with historical sketch ..., 1880; Songs of the orient, 1892; The Tower, with Legends and Lyrics, 1895; Augusta centennial souvenir., 1897; Old colonial houses in Maine built prior to 1776, 1908; and Old Hallowell on the Kennebee, 1909.

== Early life and education ==
Emma Caroline Huntington was born in Hallowell, Maine, August 6, 1845. She was the daughter of Samuel W. Huntington, whose ancestors came from Norwich, England, to Massachusetts in 1633. The Huntington family in the United States, to which her father belonged, was first represented in New England by the widow Margaret Huntington, who came from England with her children (her husband having died on the voyage) in 1633, as certified by the church records of Roxbury, Massachusetts. This family counted among its members many distinguished men: one was a signer of the Declaration of Independence; another, one of General George Washington's staff; and in later generations, some of them were well known as artists, writers, lawyers, and divines.

Her mother was Sally Mayo. Nason's maternal grandfather was a direct descendant of Rev. John Mayo, the Puritan divine, who was one of the founders of the town of Barnstable, Cape Cod, and the first pastor of the Second Church in Boston. Nason was also descended in several lines from Mayflower Pilgrims and other ancestors who bore their part in early colonial history.

Nason's early days were passed in Hallowed Academy, where she distinguished herself as a student, excelling in mathematics and the languages. In 1865, she was graduated from the collegiate course of the Maine Wesleyan Seminary (now Kents Hill School), in Kents Hill, Maine, that institution being then the only one in New England which offered a regular college course for women.

== Career ==
For the first two years following graduation, she taught French and mathematics.

She began at an early age to write verses. For several years she wrote under the pen name of "John G. Andrews". Her first published writings appeared in the Portland Transcript, and consisted of short stories, translations from the German, and verses. In 1875, she gave the commencement poem before the literary societies of her alma mater, and on March 9, 1880, she read an original poem at the dedication of the building, which was the gift of the citizens of Hallowell to its old and honored institution, the Hallowell Social Library. The poem, with the oration delivered at the same time, was published in a souvenir volume.

Her first poem published under her own name was "The Tower," which appeared in the Atlantic Monthly, May, 1874, and won ready recognition. Since then, she was a frequent contributor to The Independent, The Churchman, and The Commonwealth. Her writing focused chiefly for some years with songs of child life, which appeared at intervals in such magazines as St. Nicholas, Wide Awake, and Our Little Ones. In 1888, these were collected in a volume called White Sails. These verses were familiar in school-rooms throughout the country. One in particular, "The Bravest Boy in Town," tells an incident of the American Civil War, and was a favorite in the U.S. "The Mission Tea Party" gives a pathetic incident in the siege of Lucknow. "The Bishop's Visit," "A Little Girl Lost," "Unter den Linden," "Saint Olga's Bell," and the "Battle Song" were widely copied and used as recitations. Before the publication of her volume, White Sails, she was chosen one of ten poets whose ballads appeared in a volume entitled, Children's Ballads from History and Folk Lore.

Nason wrote a series of articles on "Ancient Art for Young People." She also wrote many household articles, as well as short stories and translations from the German. Her verses entitled "Body and Soul," which appeared in The Century Magazine for July, 1892, were ranked among the best poems published in the United States at that time. The verses "Body and Soul" and "Two Faces" were pronounced "two of the most remarkable poems published in this country in recent years." The former was selected by Mr. Warner for his World's Best Literature and "A Child's Question" was chosen by Mr. Stedman for his American Anthology. Nason did much work for the literary clubs of Maine, having prepared papers on "The Folk-lore of Russia," "The Abenaki Indians," "The Early Balladists and Troubadours of France," and a course of lectures on the "Genius and Love-life of the German Poets." She was an enthusiastic student of German literature, and published a number of magazine articles on the German poets. At Augusta's centennial celebration in 1897 she delivered a poem entitled "Ancient Koussinoc," into which was woven much of the historical and legendary lore of the valley of the Kennebec.

Nason was a musical composer, and was active in the musical circles of Augusta. She was also interested in drawing and painting. Her studies in oil had much merit, and she sketched effectively in charcoal from nature.

== Personal life ==
Nason was a member of the Society of the Mayflower Descendants and of the Order of the Descendants of Colonial Governors. She served as Regent of the Koussinoc Chapter of the Daughters of the American Revolution in Augusta and Vice-Regent of the Maine State Council, D. A. R.

In 1870, she married Charles H. Nason (1845–1918), a businessman of Augusta, Maine, and they resided in that city. The Nason's had one son, Arthur Huntington Nason.

Emma Huntington Nason died January 11, 1921, in Augusta, and was buried at Hallowell Village Cemetery in Hallowell, Maine.

== Selected works ==
- My Ancestors, n.d.
- Address and poem at the dedication of the Hallowell library, March 9, 1880 with historical sketch ..., 1880
- Songs of the orient, 1892
- The Tower, with Legends and Lyrics, 1895, Houghton, Mifflin & Co.
- Augusta centennial souvenir., 1897
- Old colonial houses in Maine built prior to 1776, 1908
- Old Hallowell on the Kennebee, 1909
