= Kents Hill =

Kents Hill is the name of more than one location:

- Kents Hill, Milton Keynes, a district in Milton Keynes, Buckinghamshire, England
- Kents Hill, Maine, an area in the state of Maine, United States

== See also ==
- Kents Hill School, Maine
