= Chandler Robbins (minister) =

American Unitarian minister (1810–1882)

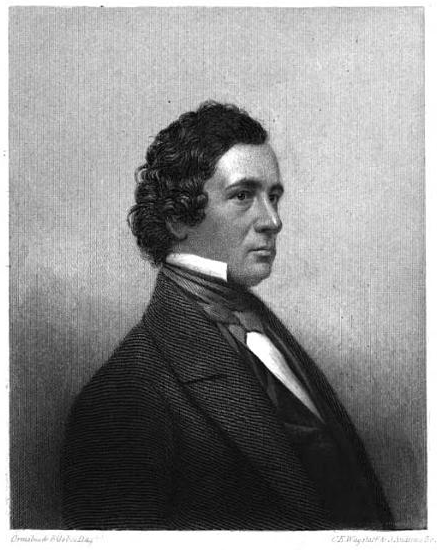
- Born: February 14, 1810; Lynn, Massachusetts, US
- Died: September 11, 1882 (aged 72); Weston, Massachusetts, US
- Resting place: Mount Auburn Cemetery
- Education: Harvard Divinity School; Harvard College
- Occupation: Minister
- Organization: Second Church, Boston
- Movement: Unitarianism

Chandler Robbins (February 14, 1810 – September 11, 1882) was an American Unitarian minister and pastor of the Second Church, Boston, a historic congregation where he succeeded Ralph Waldo Emerson as pastor. He graduated from Harvard College and Harvard Divinity School and was active in Boston intellectual circles.

== Early life and education ==
Robbins was born in Lynn, Massachusetts, on February 14, 1810. His parents were Peter Gilman Robbins, a physician, and Abba Dowse, a schoolteacher. His grandfather was Chandler Robbins, D.D., minister of the First Parish Church in Plymouth, and his great-grandfather was Philemon Robbins, pastor at Branford, Connecticut. Chandler and his younger brother, Samuel Dowse Robbins, both became Unitarian pastors.

In childhood, Robbins received private schooling, including tutelage from Edward Bliss Emerson in Roxbury. He graduated from Harvard College in 1829 and briefly attended Harvard Divinity School before dropping out to spend a year teaching at the Boston Latin School. He then returned to Harvard Divinity School, graduating in 1833.

== Career ==
Robbins was ordained December 4, 1833, as pastor of the Second Church, Boston, succeeding Ralph Waldo Emerson in this office. Robbins held this pastorate for 41 years, retiring in December 1874. He received the degree of Doctor of Divinity from Harvard in 1855. He served as chaplain of the Massachusetts Senate in 1834 and chaplain of the Massachusetts House of Representatives in 1836. He edited The Christian Register, the leading Unitarian weekly, from January 1837 to April 1839, concurrently serving on the executive committee of the American Unitarian Association. He also served as president of the Benevolent Fraternity of Churches from 1862 to 1872.

Robbins was active in the Massachusetts Historical Society, serving in various society offices and producing articles and lectures on colonial-era Massachusetts and other historical topics. He became a member of the Massachusetts Historical Society in 1845, a member of the American Antiquarian Society in 1857, and a fellow of the American Academy of Arts and Sciences in 1858.

Robbins participated in at least five meetings of the Transcendental Club, together with other liberal Unitarian ministers such as Ralph Waldo Emerson, Frederic Henry Hedge, and Theodore Parker. He hosted at least one meeting at his house in January 1839.

Robbins researched and published A History of the Second Church in Boston (John Wilson & Son, 1852). He edited the works of Henry Ware Jr., published in four volumes in 1846–47. He compiled The Social Hymn Book (James Munroe & Company, 1843) and Hymn Book for Christian Worship (Walker, Wise, & Company, 1864). He also printed many of his sermons and lectures.

== Personal life ==
Days after his ordination in December 1833, Robbins married Mary Eliza Frothingham (1812–1870), a woman from Boston. The couple had seven children. Mary Robbins died during the summer of 1870 after a prolonged illness. In June 1874, Robbins remarried to Sarah Ripley (Fiske) Willard (1839–1905), a widow some 30 years his junior, and had three more children with her.

In 1870, Robbins accidentally struck his head against the corner of an open door, causing progressive total blindness in both eyes. He died in Weston, Massachusetts, on September 11, 1882, at the age of 72. He was buried at Mount Auburn Cemetery.
