= George Ives =

George Ives may refer to:

- George Burnham Ives (1856–1930), American bibliographer, editor, and translator
- George Cecil Ives (1867–1950), German-British poet, writer, penal reformer and early gay rights campaigner
- George Edward Ives (1845–1894), American musician and father of Charles Ives
- George Frederick Ives (1881–1993), Canadian, last surviving veteran of the Second Boer War
- George Homer Ives (1836–1863), American bandit and villain
- George Ives (actor) (1926–2013), American actor

== See also ==
- Ives, a surname
