= Powder Town =

1942 film by Rowland V. Lee

- Film poster
- Directed by: Rowland V. Lee
- Written by: Vicki Baum; Max Brand; John Twist; David Boehm; Grace Norton
- Produced by: Cliff Reid
- Starring: Edmond O'Brien; Victor McLaglen
- Cinematography: Frank Redman
- Music by: Roy Webb
- Distributed by: RKO
- Release date: June 19, 1942
- Running time: 79 minutes
- Country: United States
- Language: English

Powder Town is a 1942 comedy about an eccentric scientist thrust into danger and romance. Max Brand worked on the screenplay and published a novelisation under his own name.

== Plot ==
Young J. Quincy Pennant is a brilliant but absent-minded scientist who is experimenting with an explosive method which directs a shock wave past obstructions to impact a distant target. He is sent to a rapidly growing "powder town" being developed around an arsenal and munitions factory where population growth has attracted criminals, foreign spies and saboteurs.

Pennant is placed in a boarding house where he is the only male sharing with five female entertainers who work at a local casino run by gangsters. The rambunctious and physically imposing Jeems O'Shea, head of the powder monkeys at the factory, and his sycophant Billy arrive at the house. O'Shea plays rough with the ladies, chasing them around the boarding house and playfully molesting them. Pennant gives O'Shea a casual punch, putting him off-balance and tumbling down the stairwell—knocking him out cold, to everyone's amazement.

When Pennant reports to the factory, he formally meets O'Shea who at first is surprised that Pennant is not the giant he thought he was. He attempts to intimidate Pennant who is too absent-minded to understand the threats. O'Shea perceives this as nonchalant courage, a highly respected quality among munitions workers. As Pennant develops his shock-wave explosive concept, he is given his own pistol and assigned O'Shea as a bodyguard.

Pennant falls in love with Sally Dean who also lives at the boarding house. Unknown to him, she has been paid by the gangster boss, Oliver Lindsay, to steal the explosive formula.

Things come to a head when O'Shea takes the naive Pennant out for a night on the town. The muddleheaded scientist is oblivious to several assassination and abduction attempts by enemy agents. O'Shea takes this as a display of coolness. Pennant is introduced to his first alcoholic drink, after which he breaks the bank at the casino, winning $900 and the admiration of all the women. The gangsters start a brawl in order to attack Pennant and retrieve their money but O'Shea demolishes both them and the casino.

Dr Wayne, who runs the munitions factory, threatens to fire Pennant when he finds out that Pennant has been gambling and involved with the "gay" women at the casino but Pennant insists he wants to at least continue to see Sally, to whom he has given the secret formula to for safe-keeping.

During this time the enemy agents as well as Lindsay continue efforts to obtain Pennant's formula. The gangsters go looking for Pennant at the factory but find O'Shea in the way. They attempt to blow up the factory and set a 5-minute timer with explosives on a cart inside the dynamite room after they bind O'Shea and Pennant. They flee on the arrival of Dr Wayne, the guards and the girls. O'Shea and Pennant are released in time to push the explosives cart down the hill, where it collides with and destroys the getaway car.

The two heroes then return to Dr Wayne and the girls who embrace their men, and the movie ends with them kissing. Dr Wayne is shown the coded formula written on a wall in the office of the factory.

== Cast ==
- Victor McLaglen as Jeems O'Shea
- Edmond O'Brien as J. Quincy 'Penji' Pennant
- June Havoc as Dolly Smythe
- Dorothy Lovett as Sally Dean
- Eddie Foy Jr. as Billy Meeker
- Damian O'Flynn as Oliver Lindsay
- Marten Lamont as Chick Parker
- Roy Gordon as Dr. Wayne
- Marion Martin as Sue
- Mary Gordon as Mrs. Douglas
- Frances E. Neal as Carol
- Julie Warren as Betty
- Jane Woodworth as Helen
- George Cleveland as Gus the Janitor
