= Henry P. Torsey =

American politician

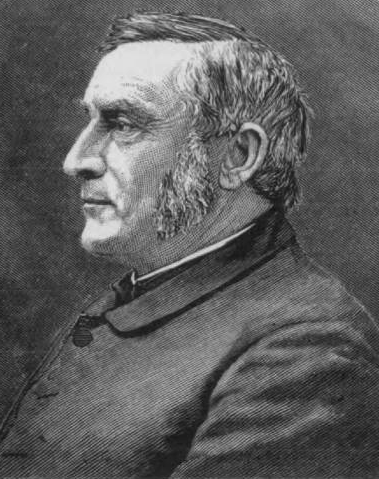

Member of the Maine State Senate
- In office 1855–1856

Personal details
- Born: Henry Pierson Torsey; August 7, 1819 Monmouth, Maine, U.S.
- Died: September 16, 1892 (aged 73) Kents Hill, Maine, U.S.
- Education: Kent's Hill Academy
- Occupation: Educator, politician

Henry Pierson Torsey (August 7, 1819 – September 16, 1892) was an American Methodist Episcopal educator and politician.

== Biography ==
Born in Monmouth, Maine, Torsey studied at Kent's Hill Academy in the Maine Wesleyan Seminary. In 1841 he taught school in East Greenwich, Rhode Island, and in 1842 he became a teacher at Maine Wesleyan Seminary and then principal of the seminary. In 1855 and 1856, he served in the Maine State Senate and was an Independent. In 1864, President Abraham Lincoln nominated Torsey to the office of secretary of Montana Territory, but Torsey declined the nomination. Torsey retired in 1882 because of ill health and died at Kent's Hill.
