= Andrews Norton =

American theologian (1786–1853)

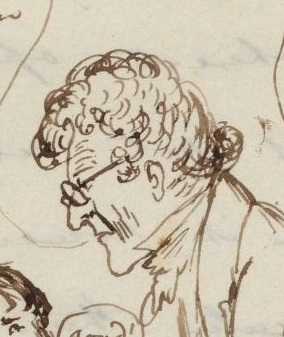
- Born: December 31, 1786; Hingham
- Died: September 18, 1853 (aged 66); Newport
- Alma mater: Harvard University
- Occupation: Librarian; theologian
- Employer: Bowdoin College; Harvard University
- Spouse(s): Catherine Eliot
- Children: Charles Eliot Norton, Grace Norton, Catherine Jane Norton, William Eliot Norton, Louisa Norton, Mary Eliot Norton
- Parent(s): Samuel Norton; Jane Andrews
- Family: Jane Norton

Andrews Norton (December 31, 1786 – September 18, 1853) was an American preacher and theologian. Along with William Ellery Channing, he was the leader of mainstream Unitarianism of the early and middle 19th century, and was known as the "Unitarian Pope". He was the father of writer Charles Eliot Norton.

== Biography ==
In his early career, Andrews Norton helped to establish liberal Unitarianism in New England, and stridently opposed harshly conservative Calvinism and Trinitarianism. Nevertheless, later in life, he became the chief conservative Unitarian opponent of Transcendentalism. As a vocal and well-published theologian, he earned from some the joking title of "the Unitarian Pope".

He was born in Hingham, Massachusetts, son of Samuel Norton. Norton graduated from Harvard University in 1804 and continued as a graduate student and lecturer there and at Bowdoin College. He was elected a Fellow of the American Academy of Arts and Sciences in 1815. He was named Dexter Lecturer on Biblical Criticism in 1813, and in 1819, Harvard made him the first Dexter Professor of Sacred Literature, a position he held until 1830; he also served as Harvard College Librarian from 1813 to 1821.

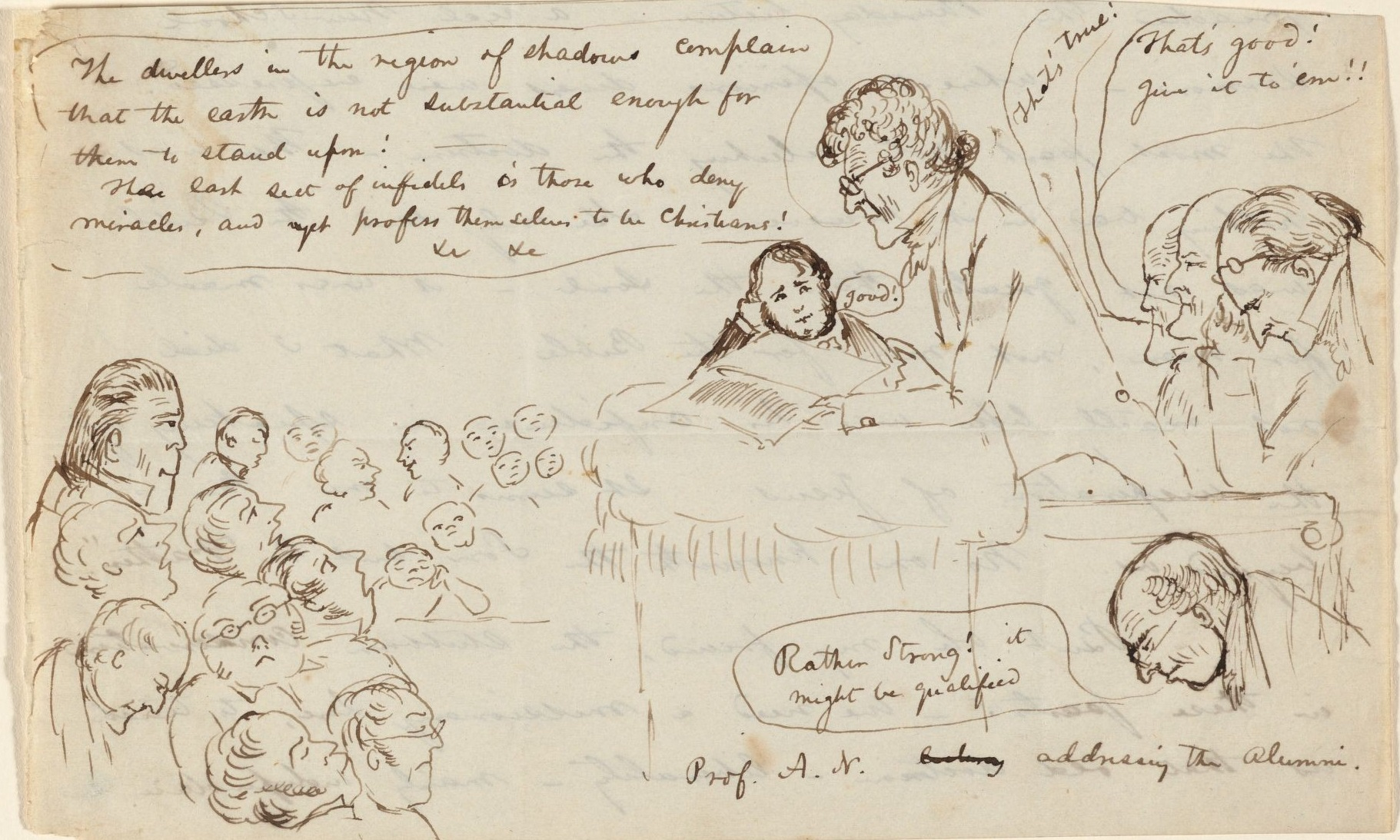
Andrews Norton attacks Transcendentalism in a caricature by Christopher Pearse Cranch, c. 1836–1838

Norton engaged in vigorous debates with George Ripley in 1836 and Ralph Waldo Emerson in 1838 (over Emerson's Divinity School Address). He opposed himself to the rise of Transcendentalism and insisted on the truth of some of the Biblical miracles, while rejecting "most of those in the Old Testament, and a few in the new", including rejecting the virgin birth. In rejecting the virgin birth he went beyond William Ellery Channing.

He died in 1853 in Newport, Rhode Island.
