= Ethel Bailey Higgins =

American botanist (1866–1963)

- Botanist Ethel Bailey Higgins, aboard the San Agustin II, 1962. San Diego Natural History Museum Belvedere Expedition, Gulf of California. (Photo: San Diego Natural History Museum Research Library)
- Born: August 10, 1866; Vassalboro, Maine, United States
- Died: March 9, 1963 (aged 96); San Diego, California, United States
- Scientific career
- Fields: Botany
- Institutions: San Diego Natural History Museum

Ethel Bailey Higgins (August 10, 1866 – March 9, 1963) was an American botanist and the curator of botany at the San Diego Natural History Museum from 1943 to 1957; she continued to serve as associate curator from 1957 to 1963. Higgins authored Our Native Cacti (1931), and other popular works on plants of the southwestern United States and northern Mexico.

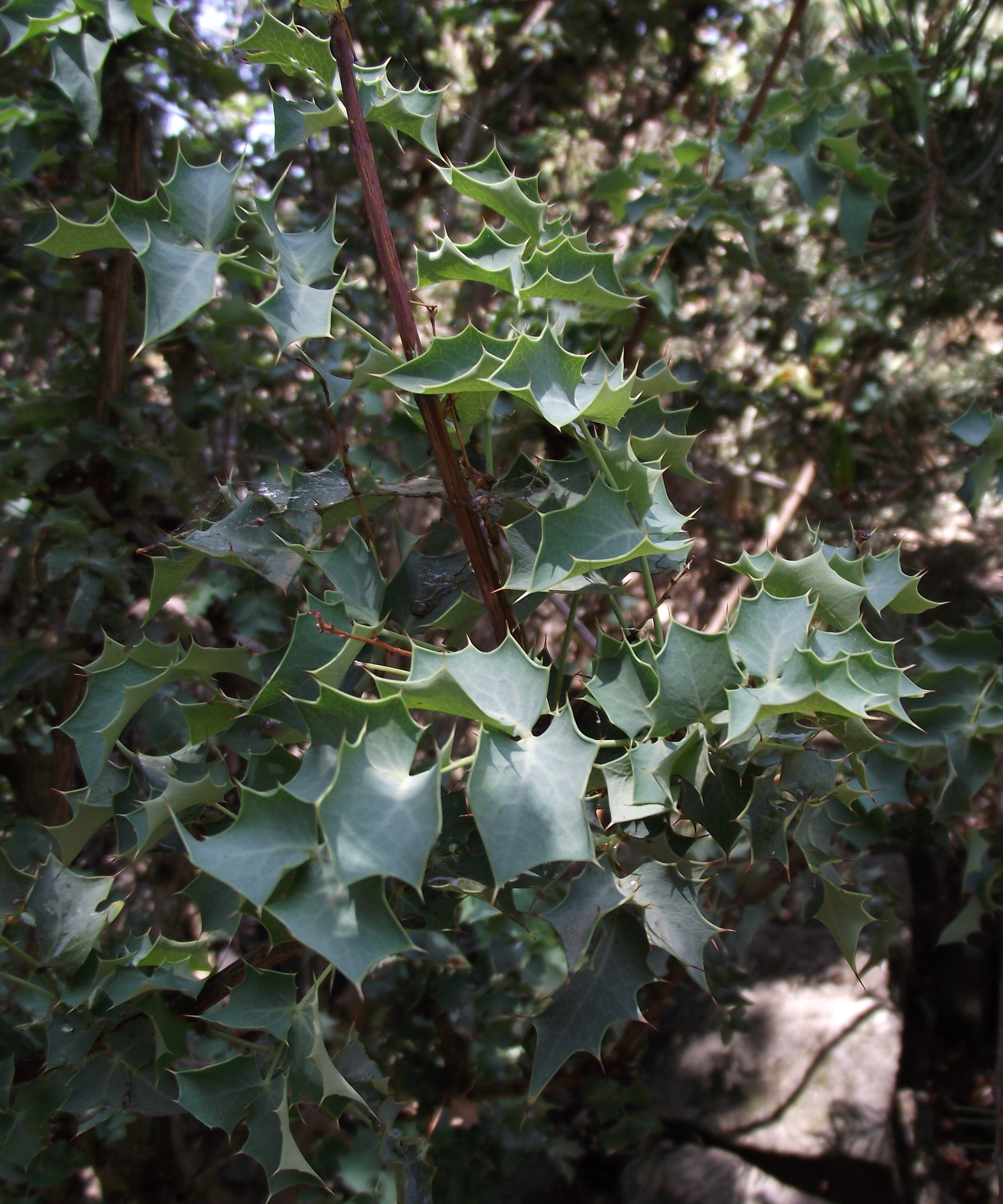
species:Berberis higginsiae (Munz) (syn. of Mahonia higginsiae (Munz) Ahrendt). Barberry

== Early life and education ==
Born Ethel Phoebe Bailey on May 10, 1866, in Vassalboro, Maine, to Mary E. Pearson and George L. Bailey, Higgins was educated at the Wesleyan Seminary and Female College (now Kents Hill School) in Readfield, Maine. In 1900, she moved to Los Angeles, California with her parents and worked as a photographer, first in the studio of Frank G. Shumacher, then setting up in her own studio, specializing in botanical subjects. In 1914, she married John C. Higgins; the next year, the couple moved to San Diego.

== Career ==
During her career as a photographer, Higgins produced a series of 300 plant portraits, taking up the study of botany to properly identify her subjects. Higgins exhibited hand-tinted photographs of wild flowers during the 1915 Panama–California Exposition in Balboa Park. In 1931, Higgins authored Our Native Cacti; she joined the staff of the San Diego Natural History Museum in 1933, becoming curator of botany in 1943 upon the retirement of Frank Gander. Higgins compiled the first checklists of San Diego County plants, publishing “Annotated Distributional List of the Ferns and Flowering Plants of San Diego County, California,” in 1949 and “Type Localities of Vascular Plants in San Diego County, California” in 1959. Higgins's surveys have been updated, first in 1986 by R. Mitchel Beauchamp's A Flora of San Diego County, California and more recently by Jon P. Rebman and Michael G. Simpson's Checklist of the Vascular Plants of San Diego County (2014, 5th ed.), which includes new species and revised nomenclature.

During the 1950s and early 1960s, Higgins participated in several of the museum's research expeditions, collecting plant specimens in Baja California and on islands in the Gulf of California. As associate curator (working with her successor as curator of botany, Reid Moran), she helped build the herbarium's specimen collection. She wrote a series of interpretative guides to southern Californian plants and trees and continued collecting specimens in Baja California, Mexico, into her mid-90s.

Higgins died on March 9, 1963, in San Diego, California.

== Selected bibliography ==
- Higgins, Ethel Bailey (1931). Our native cacti. New York: A.T. De La Mare Co.
- —— (1949). Annotated distributional list of the ferns and flowering plants of San Diego County, California (Occasional papers of the San Diego Society of Natural History series no. 8). San Diego, Calif.: San Diego Society of Natural History.
- —— (n.d.). Pines and palms of Balboa Park. San Diego, Calif.: San Diego Society of Natural History.
- ——; Jones, Wyatt W. (1951). Chaparral (Trails series). San Diego, Calif.: San Diego Society of Natural History.
- —— (1952). Native food plants (Trails series no. 3. San Diego, Calif.): San Diego Society of Natural History.
- ——; Bancroft, Sally (1952). Native trees of San Diego county (Trails series). San Diego, Calif.: San Diego Society of Natural History.
- —— (1954). San Diego desert flowers (Trails series). San Diego, Calif.: San Diego Society of Natural History.
- —— (1955). Plants of the foothills and mountains of San Diego county (Trails series). San Diego, Calif.: San Diego Society of Natural History.
- —— (1956). Coastal plants of San Diego (Trails series). San Diego, Calif.: San Diego Society of Natural History.
- —— (1959). "Type localities of vascular plants in San Diego county, California". Transactions of the San Diego Society of Natural History. 12 (22): 347–406.
