= Kents Hill School =

Private school in Kents Hill, Maine, US

Location
- 1614 Main Street; Kents Hill, Maine 04349; United States; 44°24′16″N 70°00′08″W

Information
- Type: Private, Boarding
- Motto: One person of principle can always make a difference.
- Religious affiliations: Presently secular, historically Methodist
- Established: 1824; 202 years ago
- Head of school: Dr. Molly T. MacKean
- Grades: 9–12, Academic Gap Year
- Enrollment: 225
- Student to teacher ratio: 6:1
- Campus size: 400 acres (160 ha)
- Campus type: Township
- Colors: Red and Grey
- Mascot: Husky
- Website: www.kentshill.org
- Kent's Hill School Historic District
- U.S. National Register of Historic Places
- U.S. Historic district
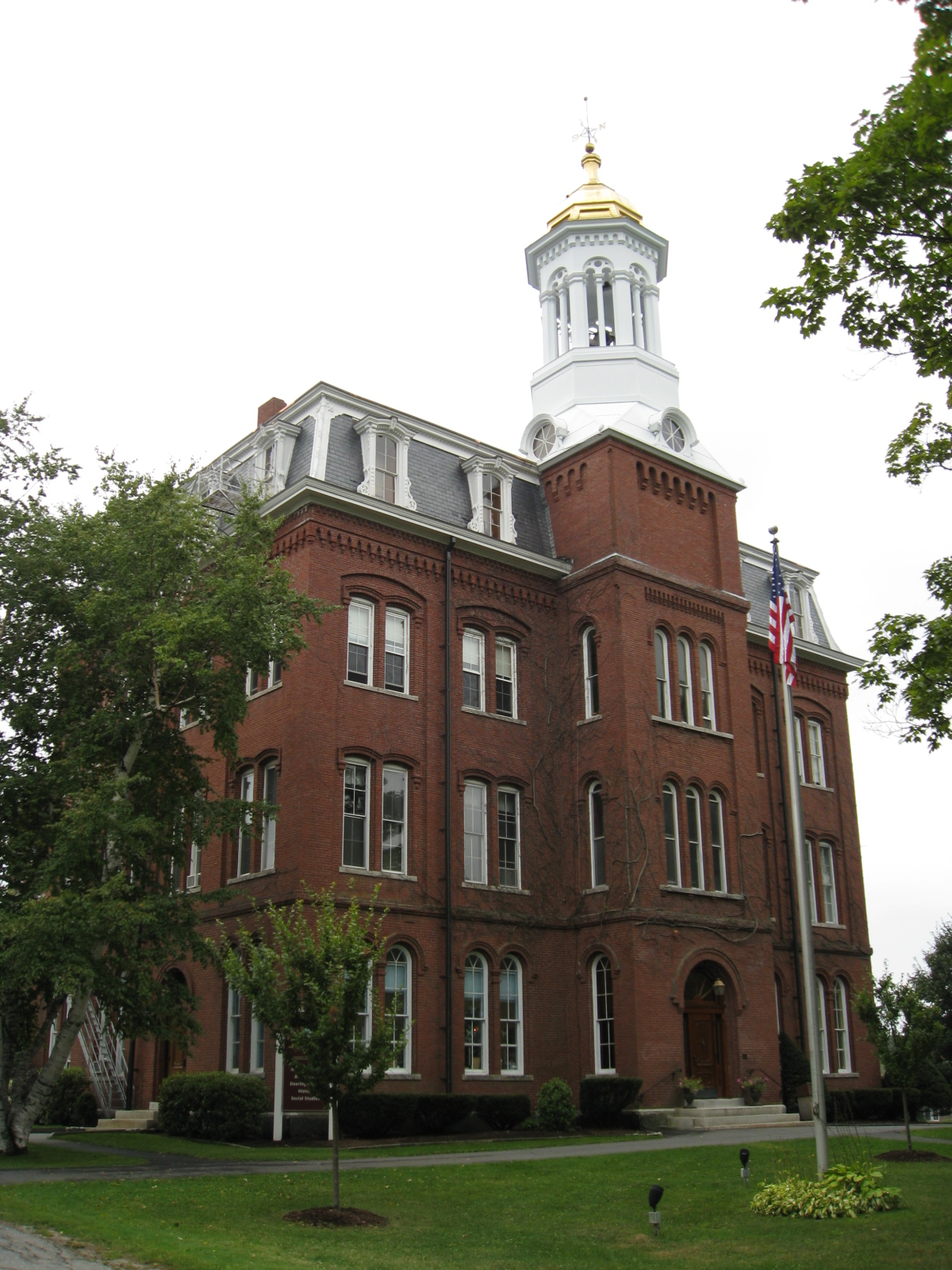
- Bearce Hall
- Area: 8 acres (3.2 ha)
- Built: 1873
- Architect: Francis H. Fassett
- Architectural style: Italianate, Queen Anne, Colonial Revival
- NRHP reference No.: 79000149
- Added to NRHP: April 26, 1979

Kents Hill School (also known as Kents Hill or KHS) is a co-educational, independent college-preparatory school for boarding and day students. Kents Hill is located in Kents Hill, Maine, 12 miles west of the state capital of Augusta. It is the 30th oldest boarding school in the United States and one of the oldest continuously operating co-educational college preparatory schools. One of the three oldest Methodist academies in the United States (with Cazenovia Seminary and Wilbraham Academy), the school is now a member of the Association of Independent Schools in New England (AISNE) and accredited by the New England Association of Schools and Colleges (NEASC).

== History ==
=== Origins ===
Kents Hill was founded in 1824 as the Maine Wesleyan Seminary by Luther Sampson, a Duxbury, Massachusetts native and a veteran of the American Revolution. According to an early publication of the Kents Hill Breeze, a defunct school periodical, Luther "was of the fifth generation in lineal descent from Henry Sampson, one of the Pilgrim band that landed on Plymouth Rock, December 22, 1620." A carpenter who had not had a formal education, Sampson wanted to use the wealth he had earned in his profession and the government-granted assignment of land he earned as a Colonial soldier to benefit society and to glorify God. Sampson, his wife Abigail Ford, and their children lived in Duxbury and, later, Marshfield, before relocating to over two hundred acres in Readfield, Maine, around the turn of the century. In 1821, Sampson incorporated there the "Readfield Religious and Charitable Society", whose original charter contained no mention of a school, but rather laid a plan to support area Methodist belief and practice. Sampson deeded the society over one hundred acres of land on Kents Hill.

Original building of Maine Wesleyan Seminary with 1836 addition

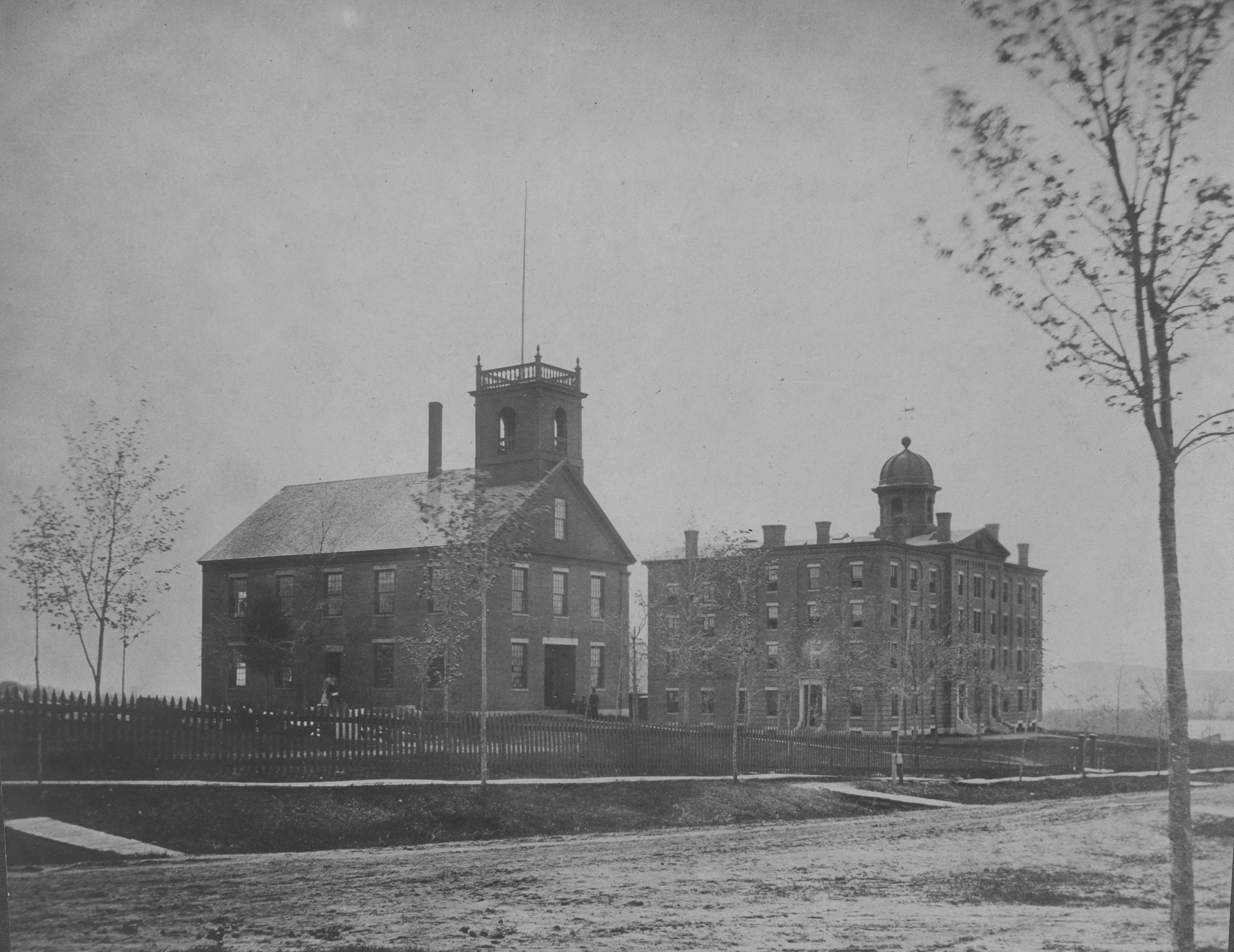
An image of Sampson Hall and the building which preceded Bearce Hall. Taken between 1860 and 1873.

Failing financially and seeking a more efficacious means of performing his mission, by 1823 Sampson had begun to explore the possibility of changing the society's identity into one rooted in the education of youths. Together with Elihu Robinson, a carpenter-schoolmaster in the nearby city of Augusta, and his wife, they opened the Seminary in order to better society through education. Boys and girls appeared on the school's roster from the day the school opened in 1825. It was originally founded as a manual labor school, part of a school movement in which academics were paired with mechanical and agricultural labor.

=== Developments ===
Later headmaster, Henry P. Torsey, oversaw the construction of Sampson Hall which was opened in 1860 and is still serving students today. Dr. Torsey also opened a female collegiate institute - the "Female College" - one of the first of its kind to offer degrees to women at the time. Dr. Torsey is also credited with introducing baseball to the school in 1861.

Early school seal depicting Luther Sampson's journey to Readfield and school motto, Deus viam indicavit

During the Second World War, Headmaster Bill Dunn inaugurated a ski program next to nearby Torsey Lake. The students cleared the land, and Kents Hill established an alpine racing program that endures to this day. The O'Conner Alpine Center boasts alpine racing and snowboarding facilities, complete with digital timing, night lights, snow-making equipment, and a ski lodge.

In the fall of 2008 the school opened the Harold Alfond Turf Fields, one of the largest turf field complexes in New England.

==== Historic register ====
The school was added to the National Register of Historic Places in 1979. Five buildings were included: Newton Gymnasium (1932), Blethen Hall (1883–84), Bearce Hall (1873), Ricker Hall (1893–94), and Sampson Hall (1858–60). Francis H. Fassett, Maine's leading architect in the middle of the 19th century and an important figure in the rebuilding of Portland after the 1886 fire, designed Bearce and Ricker halls.

== Academics ==
The student-to-faculty ratio at Kents Hill School is 6:1, with an average class size of 11. 85% of the faculty live on campus.

Kents Hill offers a college-preparatory curriculum on a semester schedule. Curricular offerings include 14 Advanced Placement courses and honors-level courses available in most academic disciplines. Kents Hill offers independent study options for direct-guided coursework outside of its course prospectus offerings. Kents Hill also provides a three-level ESL curriculum for non-native English speakers.

The school currently offers exchange programs with four international schools: Kent College Pembury, Tunbridge Wells, England; Montaigne School, France; Colegio Estudio, Spain; and Bishops Diocesan College, Cape Town, South Africa.

=== Recognition ===
Kents Hill School was voted "Best Private School in Maine" in 2013 and 2014 by Down East, The Magazine of Maine. In 2003, the school received the Siemens Foundation Award for Advanced Placement programs in math and science. In 2007, social studies teacher, David Pearson, was awarded a Harvard Singer Prize for Excellence in Secondary School Teaching.

== Campus facilities ==
=== Academic facilities ===
- Akin Learning Center (1979, re-housed in 2012), formerly the Waters Learning Center, is home to the Learning Skills Program.
- Bearce Hall (1873) is Kents Hill's iconic bell-tower structure. It is home to school Administration (Head of School, Assistant Head of School, Director of Studies, and dean of students), Admissions, and Communications, as well as the Social Studies Department, several classrooms, and Deering Chapel.
- Dunn Science Center (1966) houses Science, Environmental Studies, Mathematics, and Modern Languages Departments.
- Ricker Hall (1893) houses the English and Performing Arts Departments. Historic Ricker Theater is located on the third floor and the KHS Bookstore and Student Center are on the first floor.
- Sampson Hall (1860) houses the James R. Cochrane Library, Bass Visual Arts Center and KHS Art Department, and the Technology Department (IT), in addition to student residences and faculty housing.
- Williams Woodworking Studio

=== Athletic facilities ===
- The Alfond Athletics Center (2001) contains the Bonnefond Ice Arena (dedicated 2011), the Hawley Gymnasium, a fitness center, and locker room facilities, in addition to housing the Athletics Department.
- The Harold Alfond Athletic Complex (2008) is a single major, divisible turf field including area designations for football, soccer, field hockey, baseball, and softball.
- The O'Connor Alpine Training Center offers on-campus alpine racing and snowboarding facilities, complete with lights, snow-making equipment, and digital timing.
- The Liz Cross Mellon Lodge (1998) sits atop the ski hill.
- In addition to grass playing fields and tennis courts, acres of woods contain maintained cross-country running, mountain biking, and Nordic skiing/snow-showing trails. All these facilities are not only used by the Kents Hill students but support many clubs and youth athletic teams from surrounding communities.

=== Performance and Leisure facilities ===
- Bibby and Harold Alfond Dining Commons (2016) — Dining hall; Gruss-Bard Art Gallery
- Newton Hall (1932), formerly Newton Gymnasium, is home to the Bodman Performing Arts Center, including an auditorium, recording studio, school band practice room, and offices.

=== Dormitories ===
- Davis Hall — Senior and Postgraduate Boys' Residence Hall, with faculty housing
- Maine Hall (1982) — Freshmen and Sophomore Girls' Residence Hall, with faculty housing
- Reed Hall (2007) — Junior, Senior, and Postgraduate Girls' Residence Hall, with faculty housing
- Sampson Hall (1860) — Freshman, Sophomore, and Junior Boys’ Residence Hall, with faculty housing
- Wesleyan Hall — Senior and Postgraduate Boys' Residence Hall, with faculty housing

=== Historic houses ===
- 1821 House (1821) - Faculty family Housing
- Blethen House (1883) - Residence of the Head of School
- Jollity Manse - Faculty family housing
- Maxim House - Faculty family housing
- Weld House - Faculty family housing

== Notable alumni ==
- Harold Alfond, billionaire American businessman and philanthropist
- Ted Alfond, billionaire investor and philanthropist
- William H. Allen, President of Girard College
- David Hartley Armstrong, member of the Maine House of Representatives; United States Senator from Missouri
- Leon Leonwood Bean, inventor, founder of L.L.Bean Company
- Alden J. Blethen, co-owner and editor-in-chief of Seattle Daily Times
- Del Bissonette, Major League Baseball first baseman, manager, and coach
- Dorothy Donnell Calhoun, author, scriptwriter, and editor of Motion Picture Magazine and Motion Picture Classic
- Joseph Cummings Chase (1878–1965), American portraitist
- Charles Collins, President of Dickinson College
- Joseph Cummings, President of Genesee College (now Syracuse University), Wesleyan University, and Northwestern University
- Aaron S. Daggett, last surviving general of the American Civil War
- Daniel F. Davis, 37th Governor of Maine
- James R. Day, Chancellor of Syracuse University
- Charles Deering, American businessman and philanthropist
- Annie Hamilton Donnell, American author
- Ray Eliot, American football and baseball player, former football coach of University of Illinois at Urbana-Champaign
- Charles H. Fernald, entomologist, naturalist, first professor of economic entomology
- Maria Elizabeth Smith Fernald, entomologist
- Ethel Bailey Higgins, botanist, author, and former curator of botany at the San Diego Natural History Museum
- Timothy Howe, United States Senator from Wisconsin and Postmaster General of the United States
- John Huard, National Football League player and Canadian Football League coach
- Blair Lent, illustrator and author of children's books; wrote often under the name 'Ernest Small'
- Hudson Maxim, inventor of smokeless gunpowder
- Emma Huntington Nason (1845–1921), poet, author, and musical composer
- John Orville Newton, principal
- Jay Pattee, college football and basketball coach
- Ephraim K. Smart, United States Representative from Maine
- John L. Stevens, United States Minister to Hawaii during the Overthrow of the Hawaiian Kingdom
- Mary Richardson Walker, missionary and one of first six white women to cross the Rocky Mountains
- Elihu B. Washburne, United States Representative from Illinois, Secretary of State under Ulysses S. Grant, and Minister to France
- Hempstead Washburne, Mayor of Chicago 1891–1892
- Stephanie Welsh, 1996 Pulitzer Prize winner in Feature Photography
- Horace Wilson, member of the Japanese Baseball Hall of Fame, credited with introducing the sport of baseball to Japan.

== See also ==
- Education in Maine
