= Greene, Maine =

Town in Maine, United States

- Town
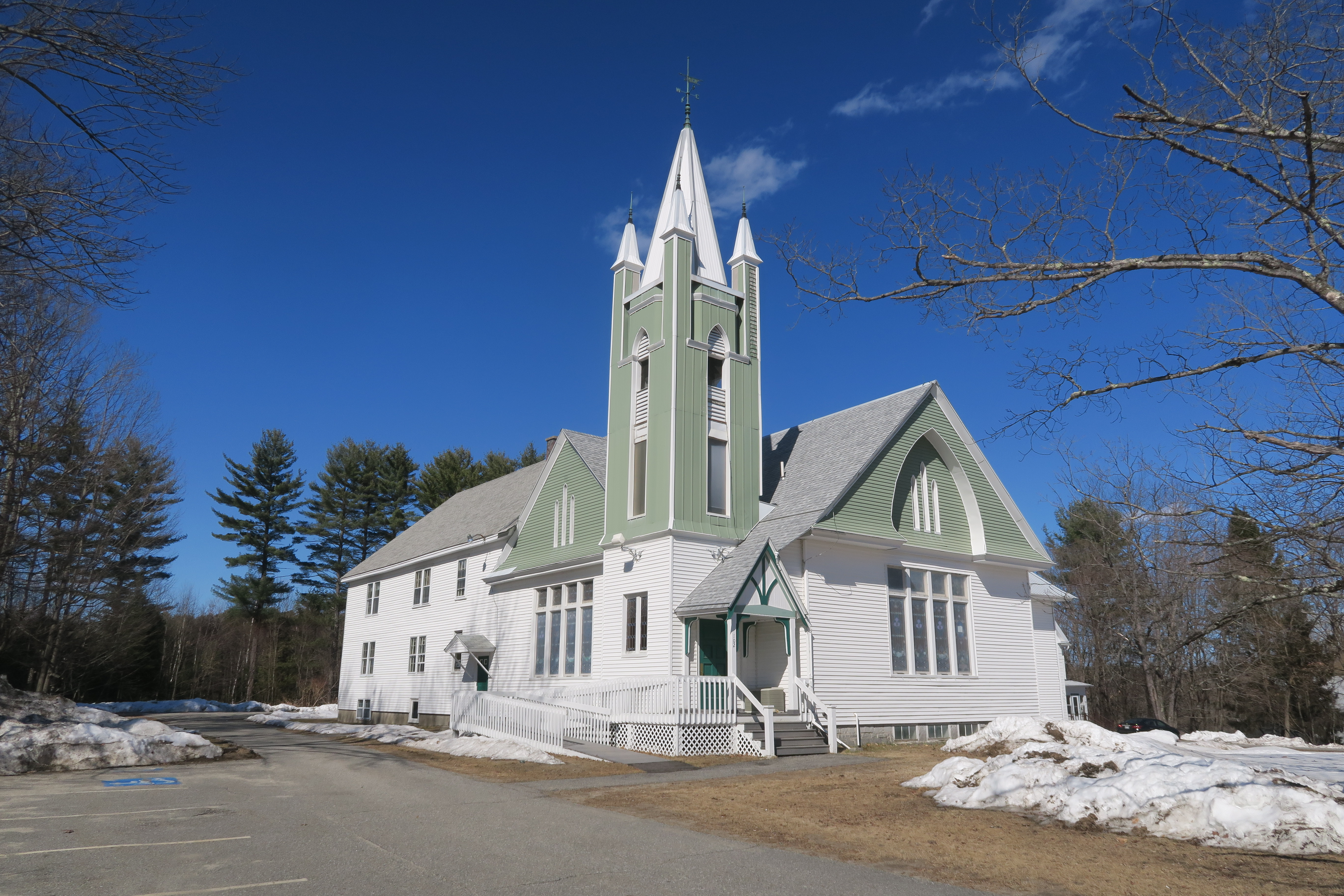
- Greene Baptist Church

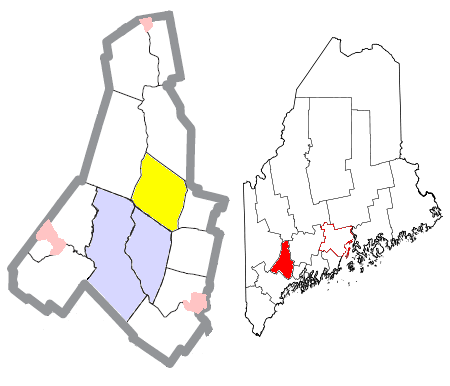
- Location of Greene (in yellow) in Androscoggin County and the state of Maine
- Coordinates: 44°12′50″N 70°8′20″W
- Country: United States
- State: Maine
- County: Androscoggin
- Incorporated: March 25, 1788
- Villages: Greene; Greene Corner; Nason Beach

Area
  - Total: 35.19 sq mi (91.14 km^{2})
  - Land: 32.28 sq mi (83.60 km^{2})
  - Water: 2.91 sq mi (7.54 km^{2})
- Elevation: 328 ft (100 m)

Population (2020)
  - Total: 4,376
  - Density: 135/sq mi (52.3/km^{2})
- Time zone: UTC-5 (Eastern (EST))
  - Summer (DST): UTC-4 (EDT)
- ZIP code: 04236
- Area code: 207
- FIPS code: 23-29255
- GNIS feature ID: 582500
- Website: www.townofgreene.net

Greene is a town in Androscoggin County, Maine, United States. The population was 4,376 at the 2020 census. It is included in both the Lewiston-Auburn, Maine Metropolitan Statistical Area and the Lewiston-Auburn, Maine Metropolitan New England City and Town Area. The central village in the town comprises the Greene census-designated place.

== History ==
Greene is named for Nathanael Greene. The town was incorporated in 1788. Land was given off to Lewiston in 1852 and to Webster (present day Sabattus) in 1895. The last surviving American Civil War Union Army brevet general, and general of any grade, Aaron Daggett was born in Greene in 1837.

== Geography ==
According to the United States Census Bureau, the town has a total area of 35.19 square miles (91.14 km^{2}), of which 32.28 square miles (83.60 km^{2}) is land and 2.91 square miles (7.54 km^{2}) is water.

== Demographics ==
Historical population
Census	Pop.	Note	%±
1790	375		—
1800	933		148.8%
1810	1,277		36.9%
1820	1,309		2.5%
1830	1,324		1.1%
1840	1,406		6.2%
1850	1,348		−4.1%
1860	1,224		−9.2%
1870	1,094		−10.6%
1880	999		−8.7%
1890	885		−11.4%
1900	826		−6.7%
1910	773		−6.4%
1920	670		−13.3%
1930	784		17.0%
1940	865		10.3%
1950	974		12.6%
1960	1,226		25.9%
1970	1,772		44.5%
1980	3,037		71.4%
1990	3,661		20.5%
2000	4,076		11.3%
2010	4,350		6.7%
2020	4,376		0.6%
U.S. Decennial Census

=== 2010 census ===
As of the census of 2010, there were 4,350 people, 1,676 households, and 1,246 families living in the town. The population density was 134.8 inhabitants per square mile (52.0/km^{2}). There were 1,880 housing units at an average density of 58.2 per square mile (22.5/km^{2}). The racial makeup of the town was 97.6% White, 0.4% African American, 0.2% Native American, 0.2% Asian, 0.2% from other races, and 1.4% from two or more races. Hispanic or Latino of any race were 0.7% of the population.

There were 1,676 households, of which 33.5% had children under the age of 18 living with them, 59.4% were married couples living together, 9.7% had a female householder with no husband present, 5.3% had a male householder with no wife present, and 25.7% were non-families. 18.1% of all households were made up of individuals, and 7.2% had someone living alone who was 65 years of age or older. The average household size was 2.59 and the average family size was 2.91.

The median age in the town was 42.6 years. 22.6% of residents were under the age of 18; 6.2% were between the ages of 18 and 24; 25% were from 25 to 44; 34% were from 45 to 64; and 12.2% were 65 years of age or older. The gender makeup of the town was 50.8% male and 49.2% female.

=== 2000 census ===
As of the census of 2000, there were 4,076 people, 1,494 households, and 1,186 families living in the town. The population density was 125.8 inhabitants per square mile (48.6/km^{2}). There were 1,680 housing units at an average density of 51.9 per square mile (20.0/km^{2}). The racial makeup of the town was 98.48% White, 0.47% African American, 0.10% Native American, 0.29% Asian, 0.07% from other races, and 0.59% from two or more races. Hispanic or Latino of any race were 0.71% of the population. 43% of the population are of French and French-Canadian ancestry, 15% English, 9% Irish, and 4% German.

There were 1,494 households, out of which 39.1% had children under the age of 18 living with them, 66.2% were married couples living together, 7.8% had a female householder with no husband present, and 20.6% were non-families. 15.3% of all households were made up of individuals, and 5.0% had someone living alone who was 65 years of age or older. The average household size was 2.71 and the average family size was 2.99.

In the town, the population was spread out, with 26.6% under the age of 18, 6.0% from 18 to 24, 33.2% from 25 to 44, 25.3% from 45 to 64, and 8.9% who were 65 years of age or older. The median age was 37 years. For every 100 females, there were 100.6 males. For every 100 females age 18 and over, there were 99.3 males.

The median income for a household in the town was $48,017, and the median income for a family was $52,857. Males had a median income of $33,894 versus $23,006 for females. The per capita income for the town was $19,452. About 5.0% of families and 6.5% of the population were below the poverty line, including 6.9% of those under age 18 and 5.5% of those age 65 or over.

Voter registration

Voter Registration and Party Enrollment as of January 2015
Party	Total Voters	Percentage
Unenrolled	1,266	39.1%
Republican	892	27.5%
Democratic	887	27.4%
Green Independent	194	6.0%
Total	3,239	100%

== Government ==
Greene is in Maine's 2nd congressional district, Maine Senate District 17, and Maine House of Representatives District 57.

== Education ==
Greene is part of Maine School Administrative District 52. (MSAD 52)

Schools in the district include Turner Primary School, Turner Elementary School, Tripp Middle School, Leavitt Area High School, Greene Central School and Leeds Central School.
