= Greene (CDP), Maine =

Greene, Maine
- Census-designated place
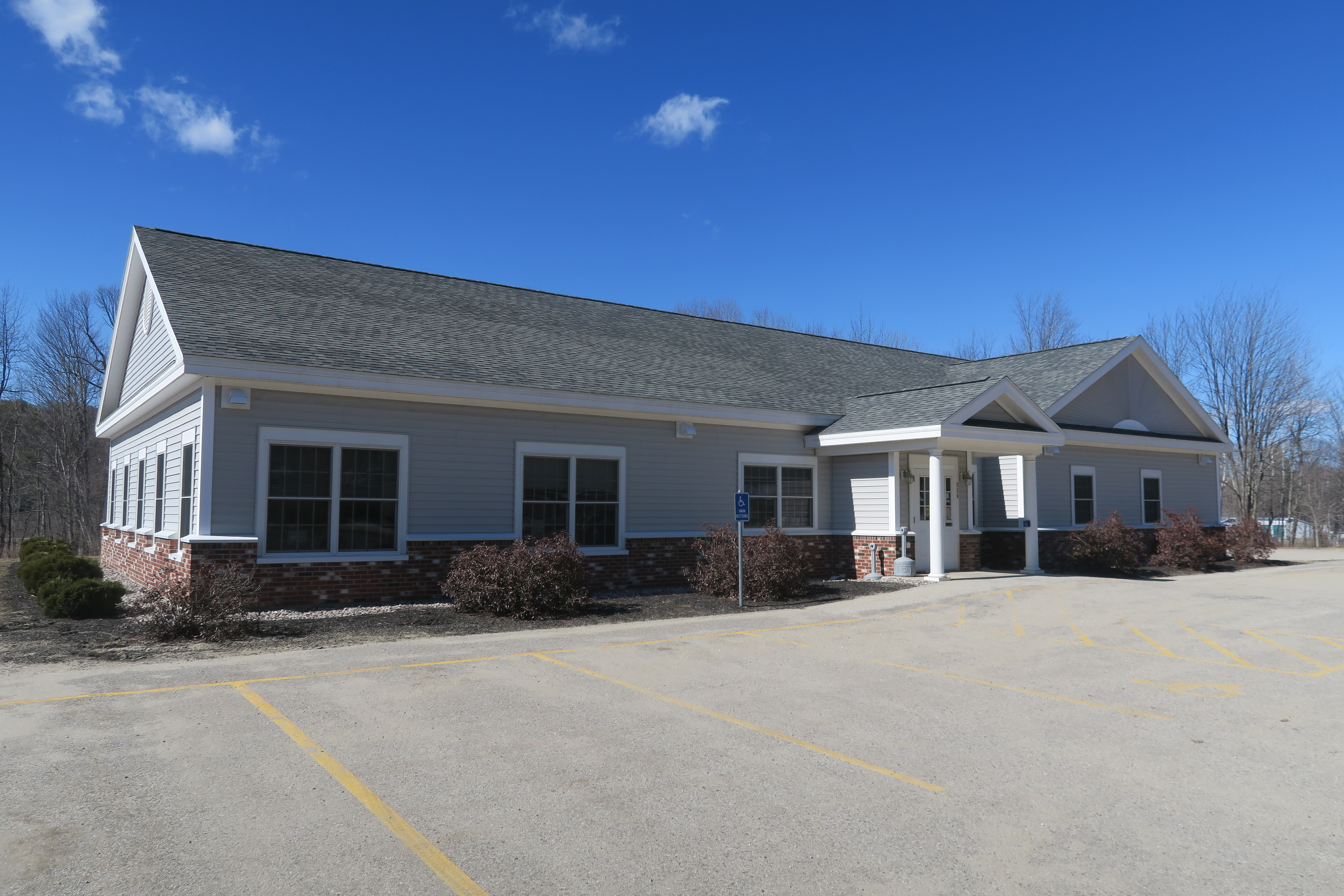
- Greene Town Office

- Location within Maine Location within the United States
- Coordinates: 44°11′27″N 70°07′42″W
- Country: United States
- State: Maine
- County: Androscoggin
- Town: Greene

Area
  - Total: 2.59 sq mi (6.72 km^{2})
  - Land: 2.59 sq mi (6.71 km^{2})
  - Water: 0.0039 sq mi (0.01 km^{2})
- Elevation: 322 ft (98 m)

Population (2020)
  - Total: 750
  - Density: 289.3/sq mi (111.71/km^{2})
- Time zone: UTC-5 (Eastern (EST))
  - Summer (DST): UTC-4 (EDT)
- ZIP Code: 04236
- Area code: 207
- FIPS code: 23-29220
- GNIS feature ID: 2806272

Greene is a census-designated place (CDP) and the primary village in the town of Greene, Androscoggin County, Maine, United States. It is northeast of the center of the county, and in the center of the town of Greene. U.S. Route 202 passes through the village, leading southwest 7 miles (11 km) to the center of Lewiston and northeast 22 miles (35 km) to Augusta, the state capital.

Greene was first listed as a CDP prior to the 2020 census.

== Demographics ==
Historical population
Census	Pop.	Note	%±
2020	750		—
U.S. Decennial Census
