= Maine School Administrative District 52 =

School district in Androscoggin County, Maine, United States

Location
- Coordinates: 44°15′N 70°11′W

Other information
- Website: www.rsu52.us

Maine School Administrative District 52 (MSAD 52, SAD 52, or RSU 52) is a school district containing the towns of Turner, Greene, and Leeds, Maine.

The school district is composed of the following schools:

- Greene Central School
- Leeds Central School
- Turner Primary School
- Turner Elementary School
- Tripp Middle School
- Leavitt Area High School
