= The Personality of the Deity =

1838 sermon by Henry Ware Jr.

"The Personality of the Deity" is a sermon written and delivered by Henry Ware Jr.

== Background ==
Ware presented the sermon on September 23, 1838, in the chapel of Harvard University. He intended it as a response to Ralph Waldo Emerson's Divinity School Address, delivered a few months earlier. Because of the wide circulation of Emerson's address among non-Divinity students, Ware found it necessary, after a lengthy exchange of letters with Emerson, to present his response to the entire University community during the next term.

The sermon refuted some of Emerson's pantheist ideas and reasserted, as the title suggests, the willful personality of God. The sermon is generally regarded as one of Ware's best works and marks a turning point in the perceptions of true Unitarianism. Where it had previously been portrayed as liberal or even radical by the Trinitarians who had just fifty years before controlled the University, the departure of the Trinitarians and the rise of both transcendentalism and secular humanism now made Unitarianism the conservative position.

Although widely condemned by University faculty, Emerson's address was very popular among students, many of whom, as Unitarian ministers, led their congregations towards Emerson's ideology. Accordingly, Ware's sermon never received the wide attention and study that Emerson's address did.
