= Leavitt Area High School =

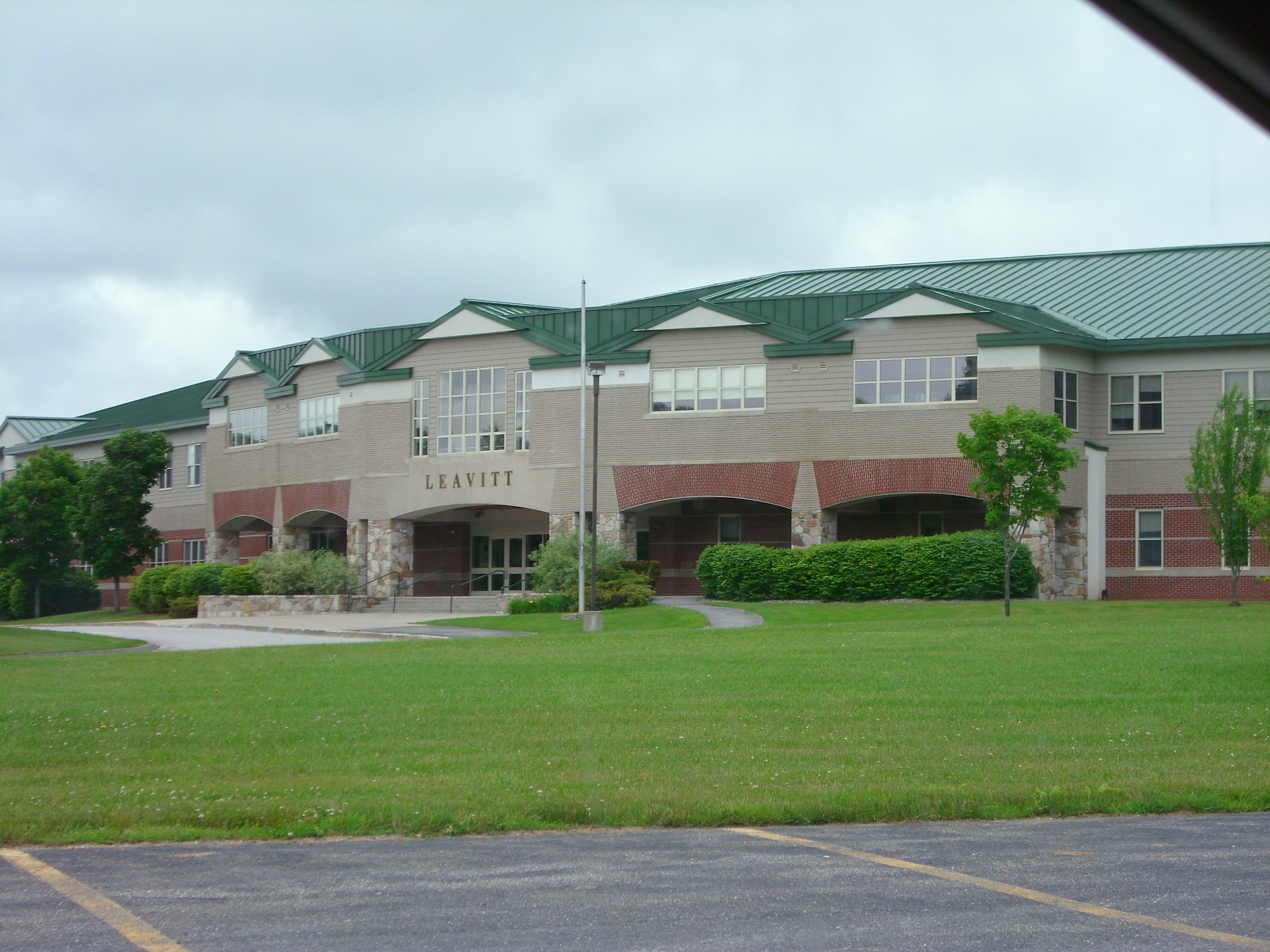

Location
- 21 Matthews Way; Turner, Maine 04282; United States; 44°16′02″N 70°13′41″W

Information
- School type: Public, high school
- School district: MSAD 52
- Principal: Eben Shaw
- Teaching staff: 47.70 (FTE)
- Grades: 9–12
- Gender: Coed
- Student to teacher ratio: 11.84
- Hours in school day: 07
- Campus size: Medium
- Campus type: Rural
- Colors: Green and white
- Song: Sweet Caroline
- Athletics conference: KVAC
- Mascot: Hornet
- Accreditation: NEASC
- Newspaper: The Buzz
- Yearbook: Angelus
- Communities served: Turner, Leeds, & Greene
- Feeder schools: Tripp Middle School
- Website: https://lahs.msad52.org/en-US

Leavitt Area High School is a public secondary school that serves grades 9–12 in Turner, Maine, United States. It is a regional high school and serves the communities of Turner, Leeds, and Greene and is run by Maine School Administrative District 52.

== History ==
The school takes its name from an 1895 gift by James Madison Leavitt, a Turner native who became a wealthy New York City manufacturer of umbrellas and parasols. Leavitt donated $10,000 to the town of Turner to build a preparatory school. The school opened on Jan. 20, 1897, and was dedicated to Leavitt. In 1899 the first class of eight students graduated.

The school later outgrew the initial building, which now houses the Turner Historical Museum and the Turner Public Library. The last class graduated from the Leavitt Institute facility in 1966. In 1967 the school's name was changed to Leavitt High School, and in 1969 when the school district was consolidated, the school's name was changed to Leavitt Area High School, now located nearby the old Leavitt Institute Building.

== Notable alumni ==
- Jared Golden (born 1982), Marine veteran and U.S. representative for Maine
