= Second Church in Boston =

Historic church in Massachusetts, United States

- U.S. National Register of Historic Places
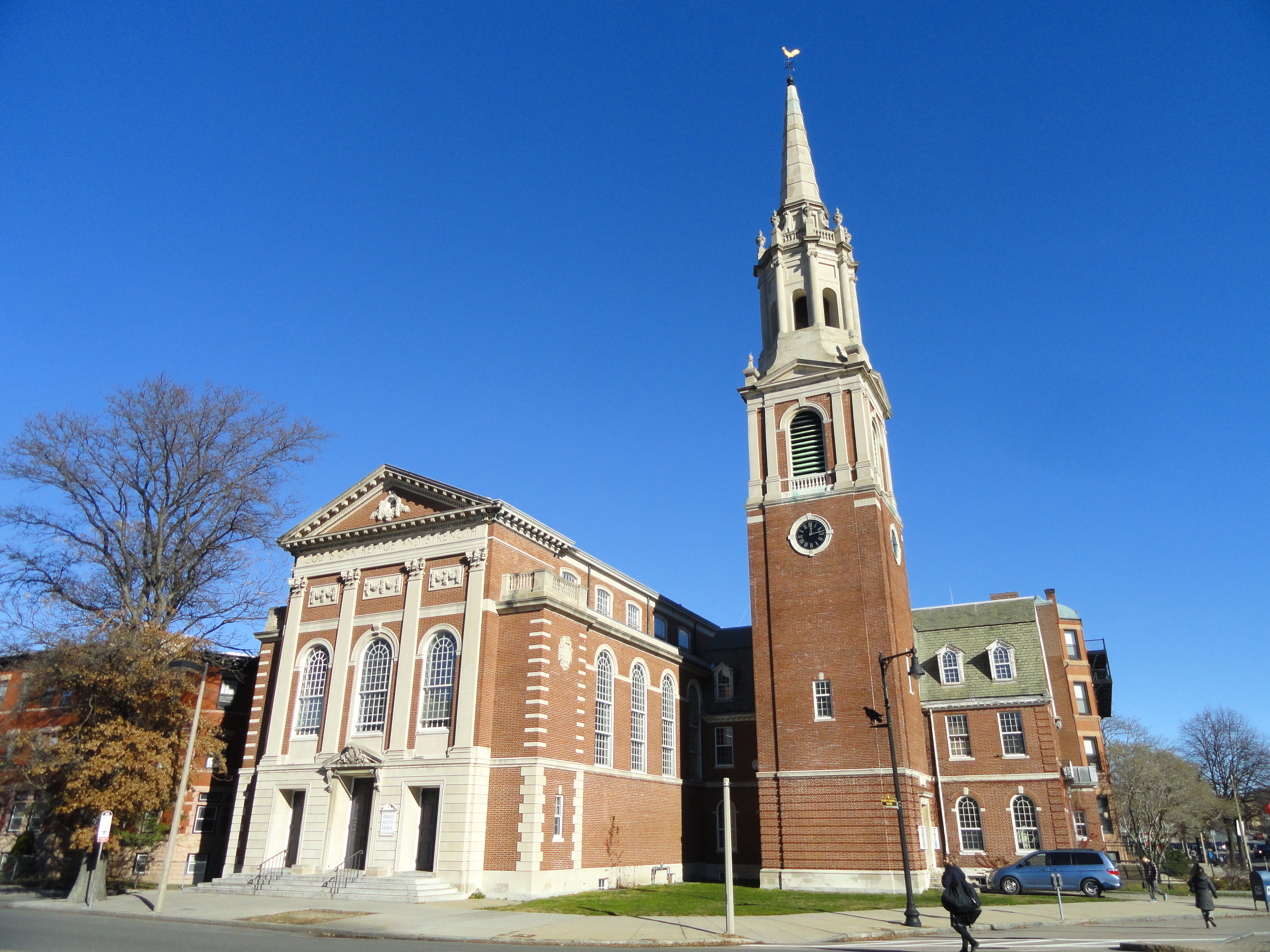

- Location within Massachusetts Location within the United States
- Location: 874, 876, 880 Beacon St, Boston, Massachusetts
- Coordinates: 42°20′49.5″N 71°6′18.0″W
- Area: less than one acre
- Built: 1914
- Architect: Ralph Adams Cram
- Architectural style: Colonial Revival
- NRHP reference No.: 10000391
- Added to NRHP: June 24, 2010

The Second Church in Boston (also known as the Ruggles Baptist Church) is a historic church building at 874 Beacon Street in Boston, Massachusetts. It was built in 1914 in Colonial Revival style to designs by the firm of architect Ralph Adams Cram.

== History ==
The Second Church, Boston congregation was founded in 1649, as the second Congregational church in Boston. In 1802, the congregation adopted a Unitarian theology. After moving to several meeting houses, the congregation constructed the Beacon Street building in 1914. In 1970 the Second Church congregation merged with First Church in Boston, and the Ruggles Baptist Church, an American Baptist Churches USA congregation, acquired the Beacon Street building. The church building was added to the National Register of Historic Places on June 24, 2010.

== See also ==
- National Register of Historic Places listings in southern Boston, Massachusetts
