= Aaron Daggett =

United States Army general and last surviving Union Civil War general (1837–1938)

Aaron Simon Daggett
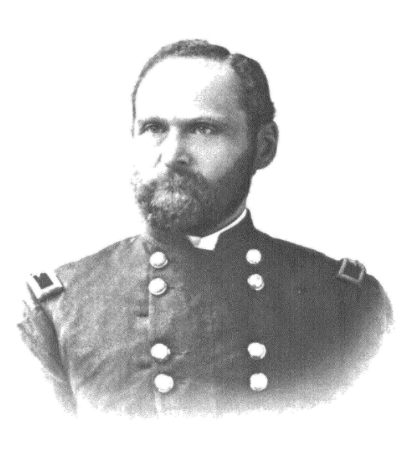
- Daggett's official portrait by Mathew Brady
- Nickname: "Danger Daggett"
- Born: Aaron Simon Daggett; June 14, 1837; Greene, Maine, U.S.
- Died: May 14, 1938 (aged 100) West Roxbury, Massachusetts, U.S.
- Allegiance: United States of America; Union
- Branch: United States Army; Union Army
- Service years: 1861–1901; 1904–1905
- Rank: Brigadier General
- Service number: 0-13005
- Commands: 14th U.S. Infantry Regiment
- Conflicts: American Civil War; First Battle of Bull Run; Battle of Gaines' Mill; Battle of Golding's Farm; Battle of White Oak Swamp; Battle of Salem Church; Battle of South Mountain; Battle of Antietam; First Battle of Rappahannock Station; Battle of Fredericksburg; Battle of Gettysburg; Battle of Mine Run; Battle of the Wilderness; Battle of Cold Harbor; Indian Wars; Spanish–American War; Battle of San Juan Hill; Boxer Rebellion
- Awards: Purple Heart with Oak Leaf Cluster; Silver Star with Oak Leaf Cluster
- Education: Bates College

Aaron Simon Daggett (June 14, 1837 – May 14, 1938) was a career United States Army officer and a Union Army general during the American Civil War. He was the last surviving brevet general of the Union Army and the last surviving general of any grade who served during the Civil War, dying in 1938 at the age of 100.

Daggett was nominated for appointment to the brevet grade of brigadier general, to rank from March 13, 1865, by President Andrew Johnson and was confirmed by the United States Senate in 1866. He subsequently served in the American Indian Wars, the Spanish–American War, and the Boxer Rebellion. He was promoted to brigadier general in the Regular Army (United States) shortly before his retirement in 1901.

== Early life and education ==
Coat of Arms of Aaron Daggett

Daggett was born in Greene, Maine, on June 14, 1837. He was the son of Yankee parents, whose Puritan ancestors came to New England as part of the Puritan migration from England in 1630. Both of Daggett's grandfathers served in the Revolutionary War.

Daggett attended Bates College (then called the Maine State Seminary) in Lewiston, Maine, in 1860. He also attended the Monmouth Academy and Maine Wesleyan Academy.

== Military career ==
=== Civil War ===
Daggett enlisted as a private in the 5th Maine Volunteer Infantry Regiment in April 1861, and became a second lieutenant in May 1861. He was appointed first lieutenant, June 24, 1861. He fought at the First Battle of Bull Run. He was appointed a captain, August 15, 1861.

Daggett became a major of the 5th Maine Infantry Regiment to rank from April 14, 1863. He fought at Second Fredericksburg, Gettysburg, Mine Run, the Wilderness, and Cold Harbor where he was wounded on May 30, 1864.

Daggett was mustered out of the volunteers on July 24, 1864. On January 23, 1865, he was appointed lieutenant colonel of the 5th United States Veteran Volunteer Infantry Regiment. He was appointed brevet colonel, March 3, 1865. He had brevet appointments as a major in the Regular Army for gallant and meritorious services at Rappahannock Station and as lieutenant colonel for services at the Wilderness, both to rank from March 3, 1865. He was again mustered out of the volunteers, May 10, 1865.

On February 21, 1866, President Andrew Johnson nominated Daggett for appointment to the grade of brevet brigadier general of volunteers, to rank from March 13, 1865, and the United States Senate confirmed the appointment on April 10, 1866.

Daggett believed in the abolition of slavery and fought alongside African-American soldiers during the Civil War while serving with the 5th Maine Infantry Regiment. He was also a strong supporter of the temperance movement and gave public lectures on the topic. Daggett was a member of the Presbyterian church.

=== Subsequent military career ===
On July 28, 1866, Daggett became a captain in the 16th U.S. Infantry Regiment. He was transferred to the 2nd U.S. Infantry Regiment on April 17, 1869. He was appointed major in the 13th U.S. Infantry Regiment on February 2, 1892. He was appointed lieutenant colonel in the 25th U.S. Infantry Regiment on October 1, 1895.

In his military career after the Civil War, Aaron Daggett went on to fight in the Indian Wars.

During the Spanish–American War, Daggett was temporarily appointed to the brigadier general grade to rank from September 1, 1898, and was mustered out of the volunteers on November 30, 1898. He was present at the Battle of San Juan Hill. Daggett also served in the Boxer Rebellion, and was awarded the silver star with oak leaf cluster for his gallantry against Boxer forces at Tangsun China in 1900 while he was a colonel of the 11th United States infantry. On February 21, 1900, Daggett became a brigadier general of the regular U.S. Army. He retired on March 2, 1901, to Auburn, Maine.

== Death and legacy ==
Aaron S. Daggett died at the age of 100 at his home in West Roxbury, Massachusetts, on May 14, 1938, making him the last surviving brevet or full, substantive rank Union general of the Civil War. He was buried at Old Valley Cemetery, Greene Corner, Maine.

Daggett Terrace (Veterans Village Subdivision) in New Port Richey, Florida is named after Aaron Daggett.

== See also ==
- List of American Civil War brevet generals (Union)
- Last surviving United States war veterans
- List of Bates College people
- Adelbert Ames, another Maine native, the last surviving General Officer of the Regular U.S. Army at his death in 1933
- Henry R. Gibson (1837–1938), Union veteran and Tennessee Governor (1895–1905). Born 6 months after Daggett and died 11 days later at 100
