= Montana Territory =

Organized incorporated territory of the United States from 1864 to 1889

Coordinates: 46.78°N 109.37°W

Territory of Montana
- Organized incorporated territory of the United States
- 1864–1889
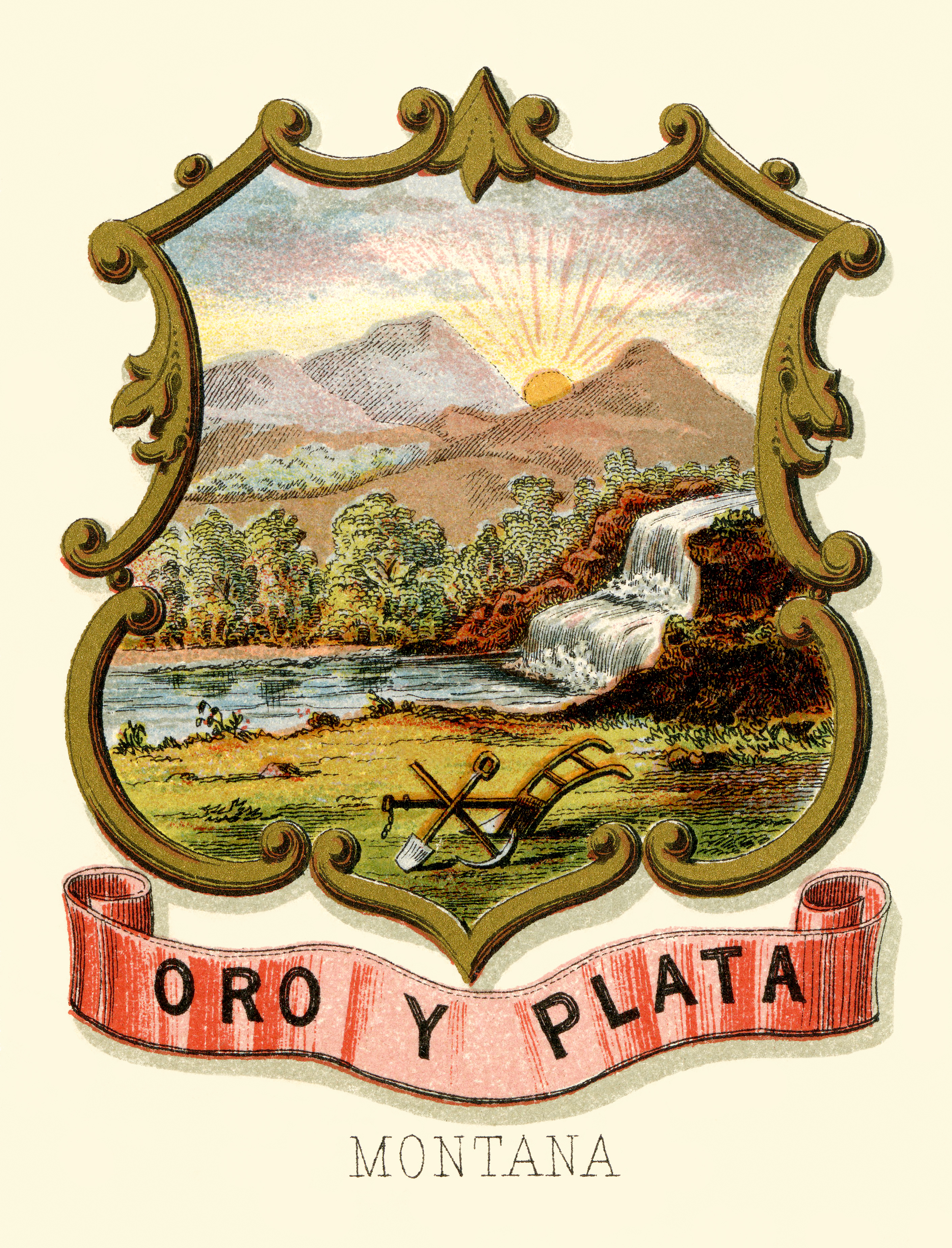
- Coat of arms

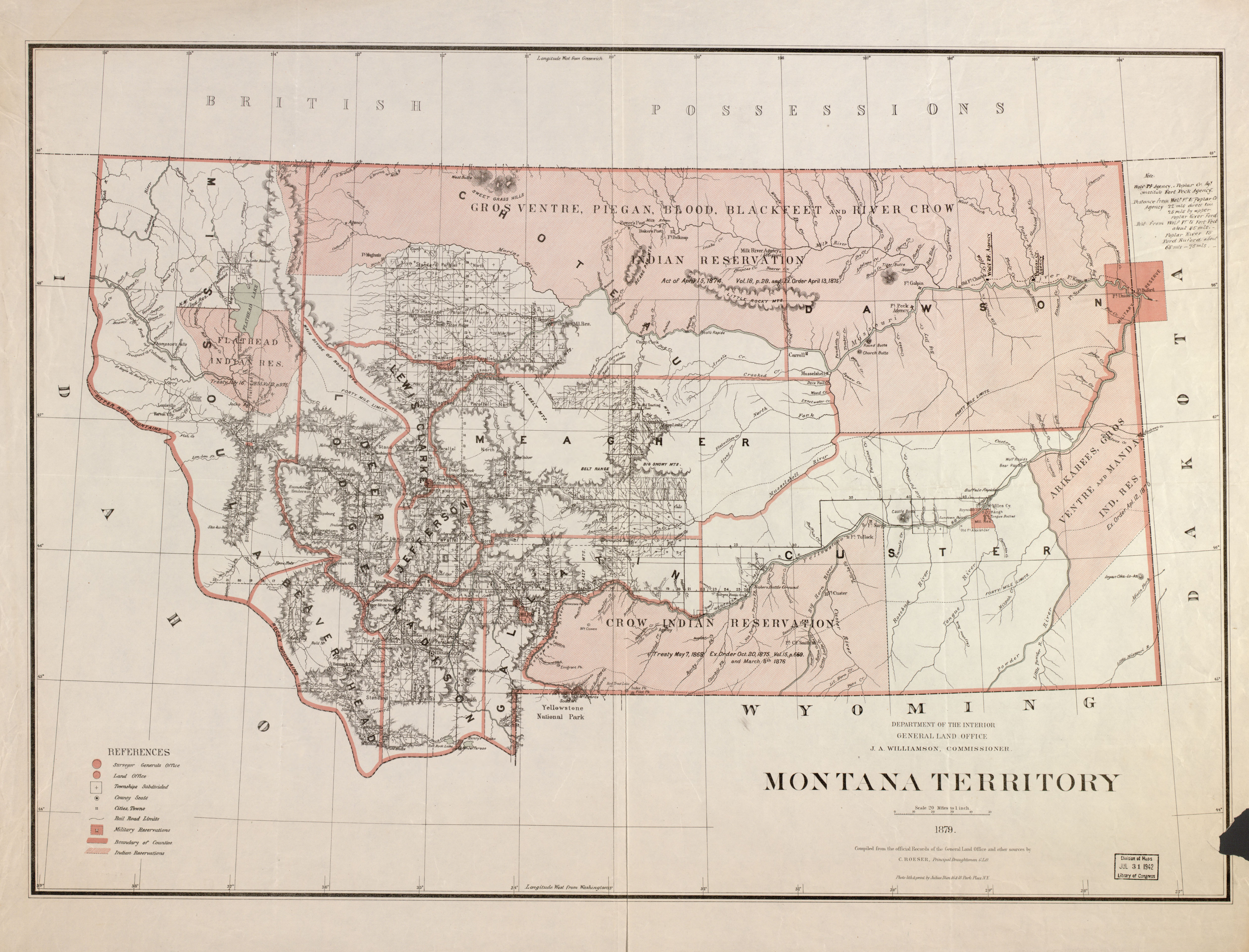
- Map of the Montana Territory, 1879
- Capital: Bannack (May 28, 1864–February 6, 1865); Virginia City (February 7, 1865–1875); Helena (1875–1889)
- Government
  - Type: Organized incorporated territory
- History
  - Split from Idaho Territory: May 26 1864
  - Statehood: November 8 1889
Preceded by	Succeeded by
Idaho Territory	Montana

The Territory of Montana was an organized incorporated territory of the United States that existed from May 26, 1864, until November 8, 1889, when it was admitted as the 41st state in the Union as the state of Montana.

== Original boundaries ==
Historical population
Year	Pop.	±%
1870	20,595	—
1880	40,440	+96.4%
Source: 1870–1880;

Montana Territory was organized out of the existing Idaho Territory by Act of Congress and signed into law by President Abraham Lincoln on May 26, 1864. The areas east of the Continental Divide had been previously part of the Nebraska Territory and Dakota Territory and had been acquired by the United States in the Louisiana Purchase.

The territory also included a portion of the Idaho Territory west of the continental divide and east of the Bitterroot Range, which had been acquired by the United States in the Oregon Treaty, and originally included in the Oregon Territory. The part of the Oregon Territory that became part of Montana had been split off as part of the Washington Territory.

The boundary between the Washington Territory and Dakota Territory was the Continental Divide (as shown on the 1861 map); however, the boundary between the Idaho Territory and the Montana Territory followed the Bitterroot Range north of 46°30′ north (as shown on the 1864 map). This change was due in part to Congress unifying the area with the creation of Idaho Territory in 1863, coupled with the subsequent political maneuvering of Sidney Edgerton, soon to be the first Territorial Governor of Montana, and his allies in the Congress. They successfully implemented the boundary change that won the Flathead and Bitterroot valleys for Montana Territory. The Organic Act of the Territory of Montana defines the boundary as extending from the modern intersection of Montana, Idaho, and Wyoming at:

The forty-fourth degree and thirty minutes of north latitude; thence due west along said forty-fourth degree and thirty minutes of north latitude to a point formed by its intersection with the crest of the Rocky Mountains; thence following the crest of the Rocky Mountains northward till its intersection with the Bitter Root Mountains; thence northward along the crest of the Bitter Root Mountains to its intersection with the thirty-ninth degree of longitude west from Washington; thence along said thirty-ninth degree of longitude northward to the boundary line of British possessions.

Upon the establishment of the Wyoming Territory in 1868, an enclave of Dakota Territory known as Lost Dakota was accidentally created. This error was overlooked by the federal government until 1873, when it was annexed and thereby incorporated into Gallatin County, Montana. The Montana Territory was admitted to the Union as the State of Montana on November 8, 1889.

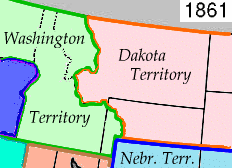

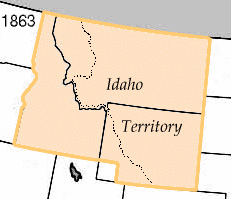

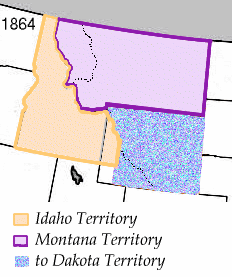

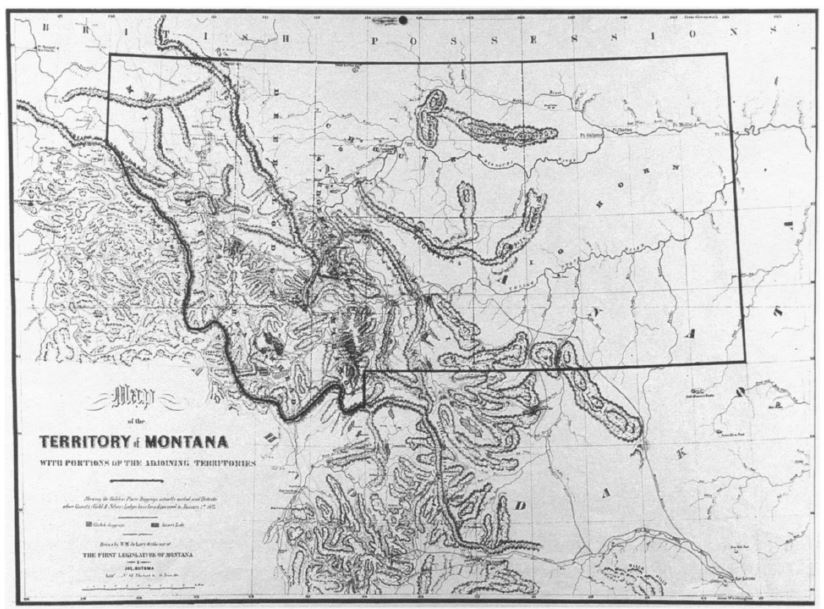
de Lacy's 1865 map of the Montana Territory

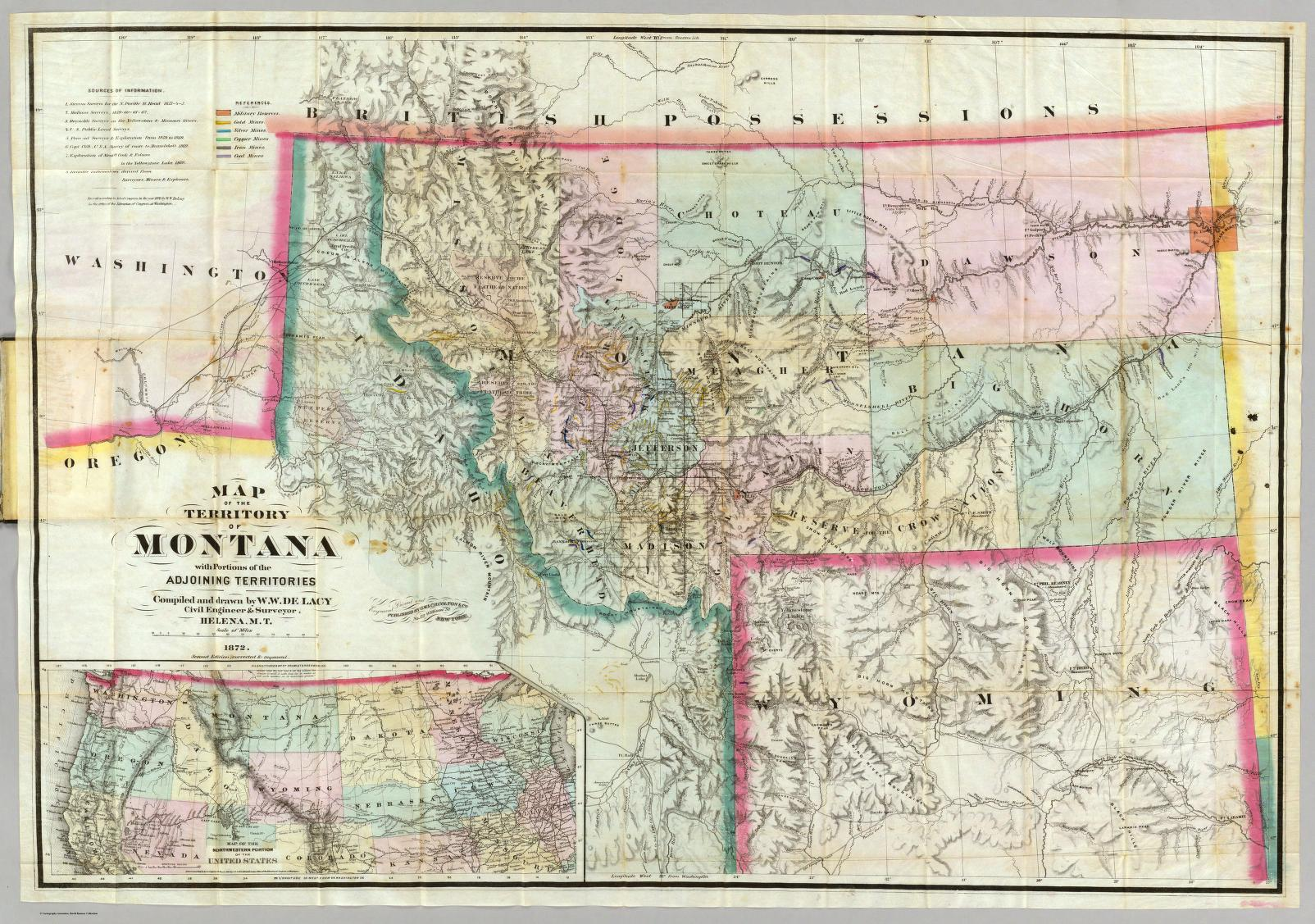
de Lacy's 1872 map of the Montana Territory

== Government ==
The act of Congress of 1864 creating Montana, known as the Organic Act, prescribed a somewhat standard organization for the territorial government of Montana. It established executive, judicial, and legislative branches of government, however, the federal government held a dominant role in administering the new territory. Particularly, the Congress reserved the right to nullify any laws passed by the citizen-elected territorial legislature. The President of the United States appointed the most powerful positions in the territory, including a governor, secretary of the territory, and three members of the territorial supreme court, with the advice and consent of the U.S. Senate. The citizens of the territory elected a legislative assembly, consisting of a Council and House of Representatives, which together created the laws for the territory. Citizens also elected a lone delegate to Congress as strictly an advisor to the U.S. House of Representatives; a territorial delegate was not permitted to vote. The territorial government was meant to provide a training ground for a future move to statehood, allowing time for an area's institutions to mature and populations to grow.

=== Executive ===
==== Governor ====
The governor served a four-year term, unless removed by the President. Duties of the office included 1) the faithful execution of the laws, 2) to serve as the commander-in-chief of the militia, and 3) to serve as the superintendent of Indian affairs. The governor also had to approve or veto laws within three days of passage by the territorial legislative assembly.

Parties

Dem Democratic Rep Republican

Governors of Montana Territory
#	Governor	Party	Term start	Term end	Appointed by	Notes
1	Sidney Edgerton	Rep	June 22, 1864	July 12, 1866	Abraham Lincoln	Did not find out he had been appointed right away; left Montana in September 1865 and did not return for 25 years
2	Green Clay Smith	Dem	July 13, 1866	April 9, 1869	Andrew Johnson	Did not assume office until October 1866; stopped functioning as governor in summer 1868
3	James Mitchell Ashley	Rep	April 9, 1869	July 12, 1870	Ulysses S. Grant	Removed from office by President Ulysses S. Grant in mid-December 1869 for unclear reasons.
4	Benjamin F. Potts	Rep	July 13, 1870	January 14, 1883	Ulysses S. Grant	
5	John Schuyler Crosby	Rep	January 15, 1883	December 15, 1884	Chester A. Arthur	
6	B. Platt Carpenter	Rep	December 16, 1884	July 13, 1885	Chester A. Arthur	
7	Samuel Thomas Hauser	Dem	July 14, 1885	February 7, 1887	Grover Cleveland	
8	Preston Hopkins Leslie	Dem	February 8, 1887	April 8, 1889	Grover Cleveland	
9	Benjamin F. White	Rep	April 9, 1889	November 8, 1889	Benjamin Harrison	

==== Secretary of the territory ====
Warrant of the Territory of Montana, issued 1 June 1868, signed by James Tufts as the Secretary of the Territory.

The secretary of the territory served a four-year term, unless removed by the President. Duties of the office included 1) the recording of all laws and proceedings of the legislative assembly and the acts of the governor, 2) the transmission of copies of the laws and journals of the legislative assembly to the President and the leaders of Congress, and 3) the transmission of executive proceedings and correspondence twice a year to the President. Importantly, the secretary also served as acting governor in case of the death, removal, resignation, or absence of the governor from the territory.

Parties

Dem Democratic Rep Republican

Secretaries of Montana Territory
#	Secretary	Party	Commissioned	Appointed by	Notes
1	Henry P. Torsey	Rep	June 22, 1864	Abraham Lincoln	Declined appointment due to poor health.
2	John Coburn	Rep	March 3, 1865	Abraham Lincoln	Did not assume office as he resigned almost immediately upon being appointed; later in 1884 appointed a justice to the Supreme Court of Montana Territory
3	Thomas Francis Meagher	Dem	August 4, 1865	Andrew Johnson	He served as acting governor from Sep. 1865, when Gov. Edgerton left the territory, until Oct. 1866, when Gov. Smith arrived. He served again as acting governor from early 1867, when Gov. Smith went to Washington D.C., until Meagher's death on July 1, 1867.
4	James Tufts	Rep	March 28, 1867	Andrew Johnson	He served as acting governor from the summer of 1868, when Gov. Smith left the territory, until the summer of 1869 when his replacement arrived.
5	Wiley S. Scribner	Rep	April 20, 1869	Ulysses S. Grant	He served as acting governor from mid-December 1869, when Ashley was removed, until the end of August 1870, when Gov. Potts arrived in Virginia City.
6	Addison Hiatt Sanders	Rep	July 19, 1870	Ulysses S. Grant	Withdrew before taking office since he took another appointment as register of the Land Office in Montana.
7	James E. Callaway	Rep	January 27, 1871	Ulysses S. Grant	He did not arrive in Montana until mid-April 1871 to take up his duties; he was the longest serving secretary of the territory.
8	James Hamilton Mills	Rep	May 10, 1877	Rutherford B. Hayes	
9	Isaac D. McCutcheon	Rep	May 28, 1882	Chester A. Arthur	date is given as the date he arrived in Helena; he resigned under scandal in Sep. 1883
10	John S. Tooker	Rep	1883	Chester A. Arthur	He appears to have been commissioned sometime during the last three months of 1883 after McCutcheon's resignation, though one source reports him being appointed in Jan. 1884, and another on April 21, 1884.
11	William B. Webb	Dem	October 23, 1885	Grover Cleveland	One source has Webb appointed in 1886.
12	Louis A. Walker	Rep	April 15, 1889	Benjamin Harrison	

=== Congressional delegation ===
The eligible citizens of Montana Territory voted for a delegate to Congress, electing them to a two-year term. The territorial delegate had a seat in the House of Representatives and, as any other representative, participated in debates, yet they did not have the right to vote. During the time Montana was a territory, some delegates to Congress were allowed to sit on select committees and even standing committees of the House, yet as on the floor of the House, they were not permitted to vote.

Parties

Dem Democratic Rep Republican

Delegates to Congress from Montana Territory
#	Delegate	Party	Term start	Term end	Congress	Notes
1	Samuel McLean	Dem	January 6, 1865	March 3, 1867	38th, 39th	
2	James M. Cavanaugh	Dem	March 4, 1867	March 3, 1871	40th, 41st	
3	William H. Clagett	Rep	March 4, 1871	March 3, 1873	42nd	
4	Martin Maginnis	Dem	March 4, 1873	March 3, 1885	43rd, 44th, 45th, 46th, 47th, 48th	
5	Joseph Toole	Dem	March 4, 1885	March 3, 1889	49th, 50th	
6	Thomas H. Carter	Rep	March 4, 1889	November 8, 1889	51st	After statehood, became Montana's first U.S. Representative

== See also ==
- History of Montana
  - Bibliography of Montana history
  - Historical outline of Montana
  - List of people in Montana history
  - Montana in the American Civil War
  - State of Montana
  - Territorial evolution of Montana
  - Timeline of Montana history
    - Timeline of pre-statehood Montana history
    - Timeline of Billings, Montana
