= Henry Ware Jr. =

American theologian

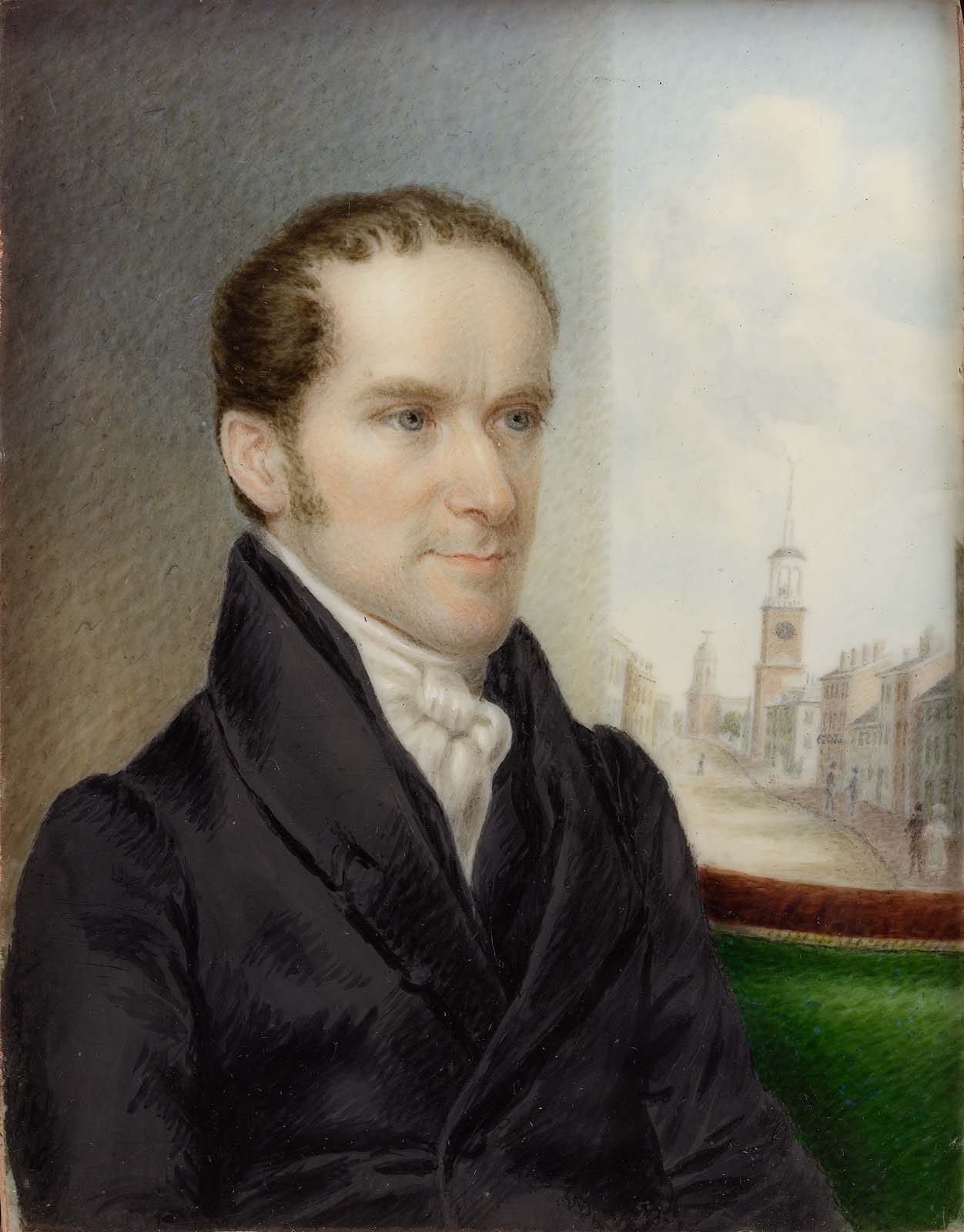
- portrait by Sarah Goodridge
- Born: April 21, 1794
- Died: September 22, 1843
- Occupation: Writer
- Children: William Robert Ware, Charles Pickard Ware
- Mother: Mary Clark Ware

Henry Ware Jr. (April 21, 1794 – September 22, 1843) was an influential Unitarian theologian, early member of the faculty of Harvard Divinity School, and first president of the Harvard Musical Association. He was a mentor of Ralph Waldo Emerson when Emerson studied for the ministry in the 1820s.

The son of Henry Ware, he was born in Hingham, Massachusetts. After attending Phillips Academy in Andover, Massachusetts, and completing his Harvard A.B. in 1812, Ware was minister of the Unitarian Second Church in Boston beginning in 1817. In 1830 Ware left the Second Church's pulpit, with Emerson replacing him there, and moved to Harvard Divinity School. In 1831 he published On the Formation of the Christian Character, a manual on morality and his best-known work. After Emerson's "Divinity School Address" in 1838, whose radical and unorthodox ideas greatly displeased many of the University faculty, Ware became more distant from his former student and friend, delivering the sermon "The Personality of the Deity" as a rebuttal of Emerson's views in the same year.

In 1846 a biographical memoir of Henry Ware Jr. was published by his brother John Ware.
