= Grace Norton =

American scholar and lecturer

Grace Norton (1834 – May 5, 1926) was an American scholar and lecturer.

She was born in Cambridge, Massachusetts, to parents Andrew Norton and Catherine Eliot Norton.[]

She was the younger sister of Charles Eliot Norton. Educated in Cambridge, she read extensively about the literature of France; she focused especially on French Renaissance writers, chief among them Michel de Montaigne. An expert on Montaigne and other contemporary authors, Norton lectured and wrote about them, traveling extensively. She was the author of several books, including Studies in Montaigne (1904) and Montaigne: His Personal Relations to Some of His Contemporaries, and His Literary Relations to Some Later Writers (1908), and she wrote the introduction to George Burnham Ives's 1925 translation of Montaigne, along with detailed comments on each of the essays. Her many articles appeared in World Literature Today, The Nation, and other publications.

She was a correspondent with Henry James, and worked with Pierre Villey.
