= John Mayo (minister) =

John Mayo (died 1676) was an English-born Puritan minister in colonial Boston, a century before the American Revolution. He was the first minister of the Old North Meeting House for the Second Church congregation in Boston's North End.

== Biography ==
Mayo was born in England and educated at Magdalen College, Oxford. While in England he was banned by the authorities from preaching publicly and was employed as a chaplain by William Fiennes, 1st Viscount Saye and Sele. He married his wife, Tamisen Brike, in England and had five children: Samuel, Hannah, Elizabeth, Nathaniel and John.

Mayo and his family came to New England in 1638 or 1639. He became a teacher at a church at Barnstable in Plymouth Colony, and was admitted a freeman on March 3, 1639/40, (Note: See dual dating) by the General Court in Plymouth. He moved to Eastham, Plymouth Colony, around 1644, becoming the minister at a church that was gathered in that town. He remained there until 1655, when he was called to become pastor of the Old North Meeting House in Boston.

Reverend Mayo was installed as pastor for the Second Church congregation at the Old North Meeting House (Note: Mayo was pastor at the original Old North Meeting House, which was destroyed by fire, as were many other area buildings, on November 27, 1676. The meeting house was rebuilt soon afterwards.) on November 9, 1655. He preached the election sermon before the General Court of Massachusetts in 1658. He also served as an Overseer of Harvard College and the Boston Latin School. Already well advanced in years when he assumed the pastorate, Mayo grew very infirm later in his service, and the congregation had difficulty hearing his sermons. He served until 1673, when Increase Mather took over. Mayo lived in a brick house on Hanover Street which was later occupied by Cotton Mather.

After retiring, Mayo went to his daughter's home and died in 1676 in Yarmouth. His widow died on February 3, 1682.

== Notable descendants ==
- George H. W. Bush - 41st President of the United States
- George W. Bush - 43rd President of the United States
