= Dorothy Donnell Calhoun =

American writer and editor

- Born: Maine, U.S.
- Died: 2 December 1963
- Education: Smith College
- Occupations: Writer, magazine editor
- Spouse: Harold Calhoun
- Writing career
- Language: English
- Period: Early to mid-20th century
- Genres: Short stories, children's literature, plays
- Notable works: Blue Gingham Folks, A Modern Slavery, When Great Folks Were Little Folks

Dorothy Donnell Calhoun (died December 2, 1963) was a writer and a magazine editor.

Born in Maine, her parents were magazine writers and her sister Rachel became a medical doctor. Calhoun graduated from Smith College and later married Harold Calhoun, a New York City lawyer.

Calhoun was the West Coast editor for Motion Picture Magazine and its sister publication Motion Picture Classic from 1927 to 1935. Later, she worked as an assistant to Frances Perkins, the Secretary of Labor under President Franklin Roosevelt, where she produced radio programs. As a writer, Calhoun wrote short stories, including the collection titled "Blue Gingham Folks". She also wrote children's stories and plays and published letters about her travels. She was also involved in the film world writing for publications and selling her work to be adapted to film. She worked on a screenplay for Richard Krebs and was a writer for "Sh Don't Wake the Baby", the 1915 film starring Dorothy Phillips.

== Bibliography ==
- "A Modern Slavery" (1909)
- When Great Folks Were Little Folks (1913)
- The Book of Brave Adventures (1915)
- Blue gingham folks (1915)
- Little folks of the Bible (1915)
- Little folks in art (1915)
- Princess of Let's Pretend (1916)
- Little folks in history (1917)
- Afraidof Bis Shadow (1917)
- Cupid's column; a farce in one act (1917)
- 100 per cent American (1918)
- The parlor patriots; a comedy in one act for girls (1918)

== Filmography ==
- Sh! Don't Wake the Baby (1915), writer
