= Second Church, Boston =

Congregation in Boston, Massachusetts

The Second Church was a congregation active during 1649–1970 which occupied a number of locations around Boston, Massachusetts, United States. It was first a Congregational church, and then beginning in 1802, a Unitarian church. In 1970, it merged with Boston's First Church.

Its locations in Boston included North Square, Hanover Street, Copley Square, and the Fenway. Its ministers included Michael Powell, Increase Mather, Cotton Mather, and Ralph Waldo Emerson.

== History ==
First Church in Boston was founded in 1630 by John Winthrop's original Puritan settlement.

Second Church, also known as the "Church of the Mathers", was founded in 1649 when Boston's population spread to the North End and justified an additional congregation sited closer to those individuals' homes. From 1664 to 1741, its clergy consisted of Increase Mather, Cotton Mather, and Samuel Mather.

Both churches were, later in their histories, examples of the westward movement of Boston churches from the crowded, older downtown area to the newer, more fashionable Back Bay. This area was developed for residential use after lowlands were filled in during the late 19th and early 20th centuries.

Following a disastrous fire at First Church's building in 1968, First Church and Second Church merged in 1970 and constructed a new building at 66 Marlborough Street, which was completed in 1972.

=== Buildings ===
Through its long history, the Second Church had some eight church buildings successively, located in various parts of Boston:

- North Square (1649–1776). The original building was destroyed by fire in 1676; a replacement was built in 1677. The newer "Old North Meeting House" was destroyed by the British army in 1776.
- Hanover Street (1779–1849). In 1779, the Second Church merged with the New Brick Church, and moved into the New Brick's building on Hanover Street. In 1845, a new building replaced the old.
- Bedford Street (1854–1872)
- Copley Square (1874–1914), on Boylston Street, between Dartmouth and Clarendon. Building designed by N.J. Bradlee, in the gothic revival style.
- 874 Beacon Street, at Park Drive (1914–1970). Building designed by Ralph Adams Cram. Listed on the National Register of Historic Places as Second Church in Boston; now home to Ruggles Baptist Church.

==== Gallery ====
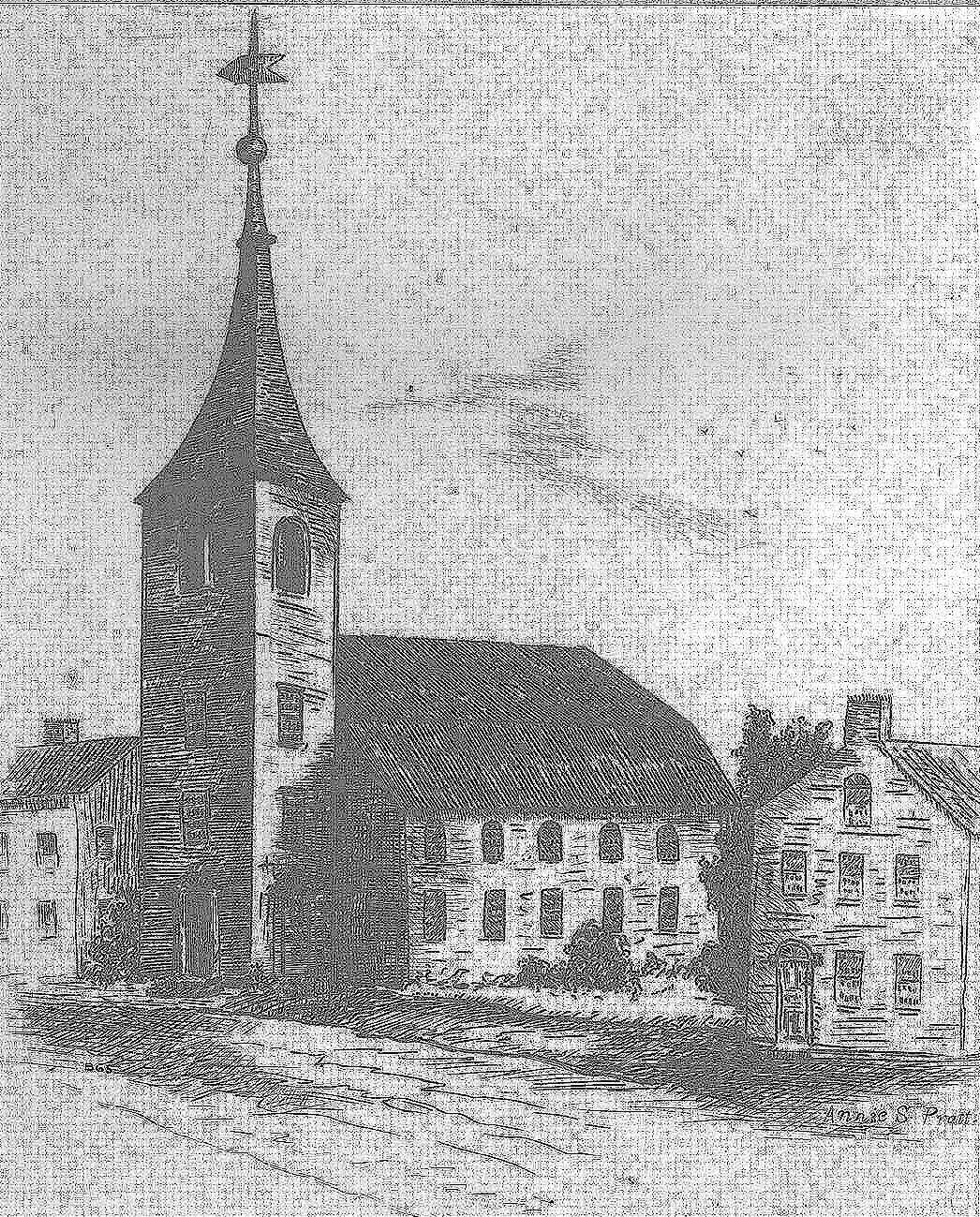
Old North Meeting House (built 1677), in North Square

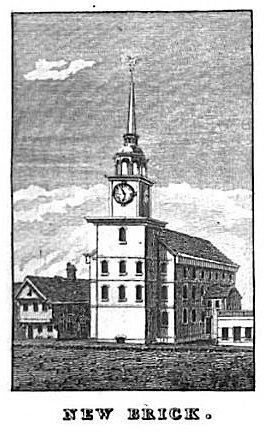
New Brick Church, Hanover Street, c. 1838

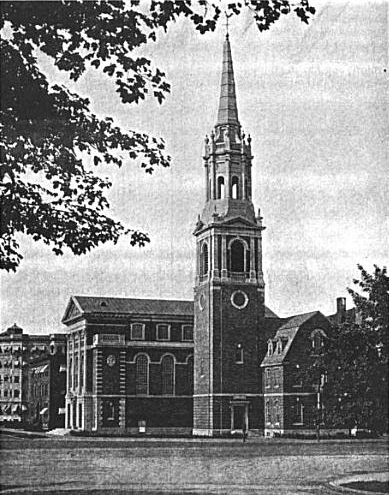
Second Church, Audubon Circle, Beacon Street, c. 1916

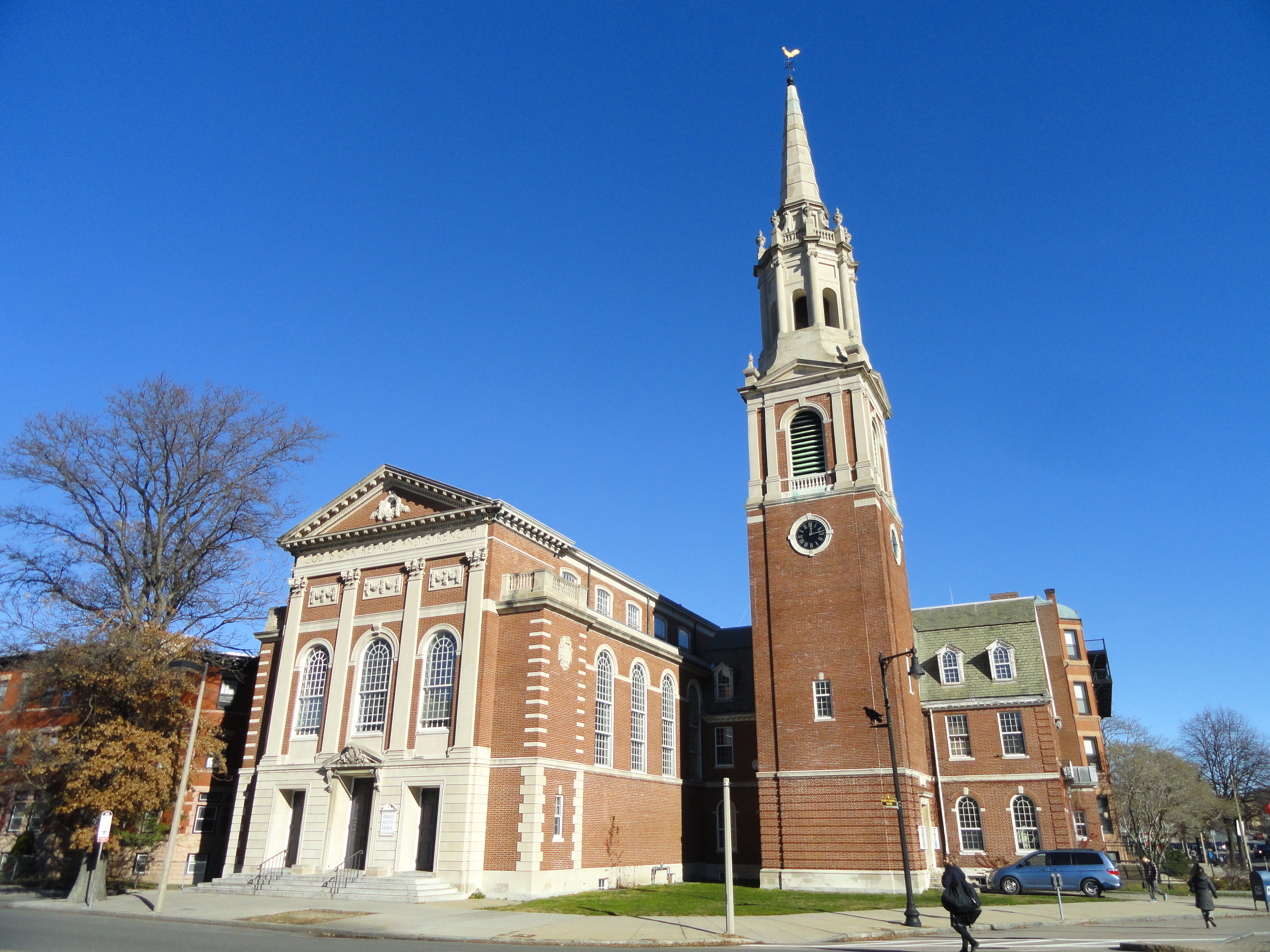
The present-day Ruggles Baptist Church building, used by the Second Church congregation during 1914–1970

=== Ministers ===
17th–18th centuries

- John Mayo (minister 1655–1673)
- Increase Mather (minister 1664–1723)
- Cotton Mather (minister 1685–1728)
- Joshua Gee (minister 1723–1748)
- Samuel Mather (minister 1732–1741)
- Samuel Checkley Jr. (minister 1747–1768)
- John Lathrop (minister 1768–1816)

19th century

- Henry Ware Jr. (minister 1817–1830)
- Ralph Waldo Emerson (junior minister 1829–1832)
- Chandler Robbins (1810–1882; minister 1833–1874)
- Robert Laird Collier (minister 1876–1878)
- Edward Augustus Horton (minister 1880–1892)
- Thomas Van Ness (minister 1893–1913)

20th century

- Samuel Raymond Maxwell (minister 1914–1919)
- Eugene Rodman Shippen (minister 1920–1929)
- Dudley Hays Ferrell (minister 1931–1932)
- DuBois LeFevre (minister 1933–1940)
- Walton E. Cole (minister 1941–1945)
- G. Ernest Lynch Jr. (minister 1947–1949)
- Clayton Brooks Hale (minister 1950–1957)
- John Nicholls Booth (minister 1958–1964)
- John K. Hammon (minister 1964–1970)

==== Gallery ====
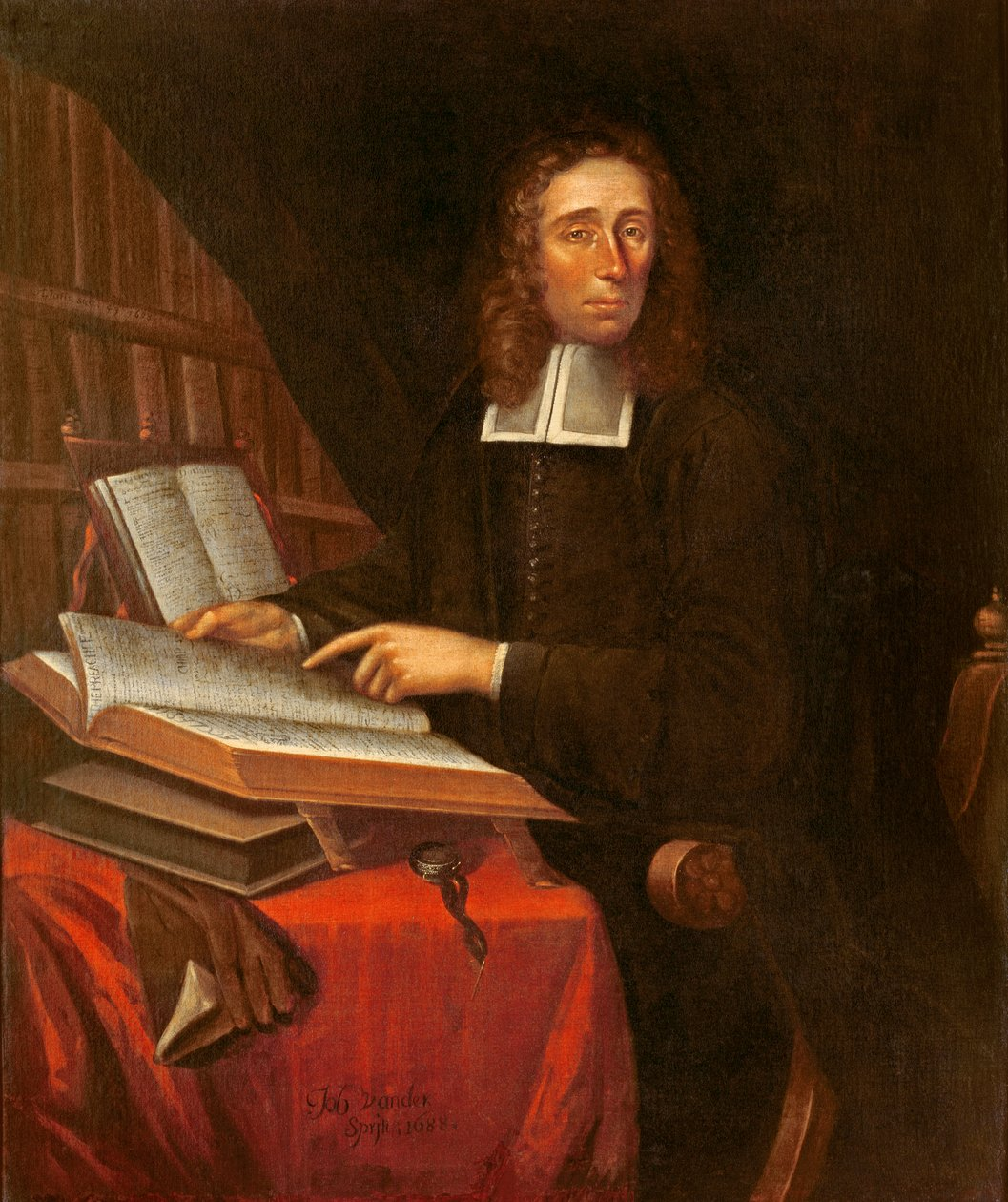
Increase Mather

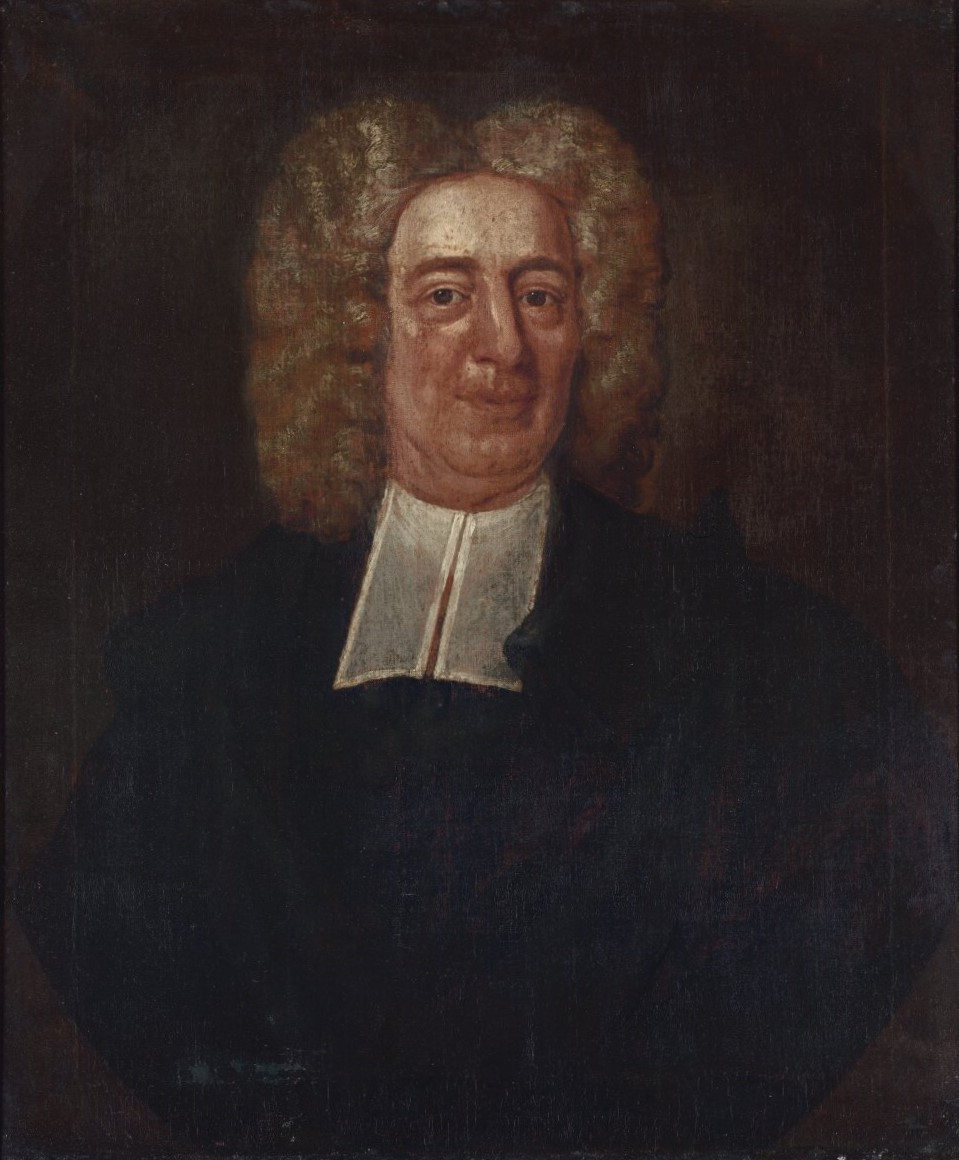
Cotton Mather

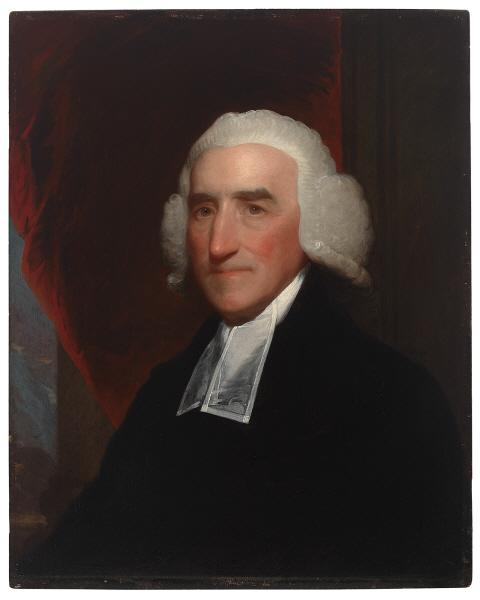
John Lathrop

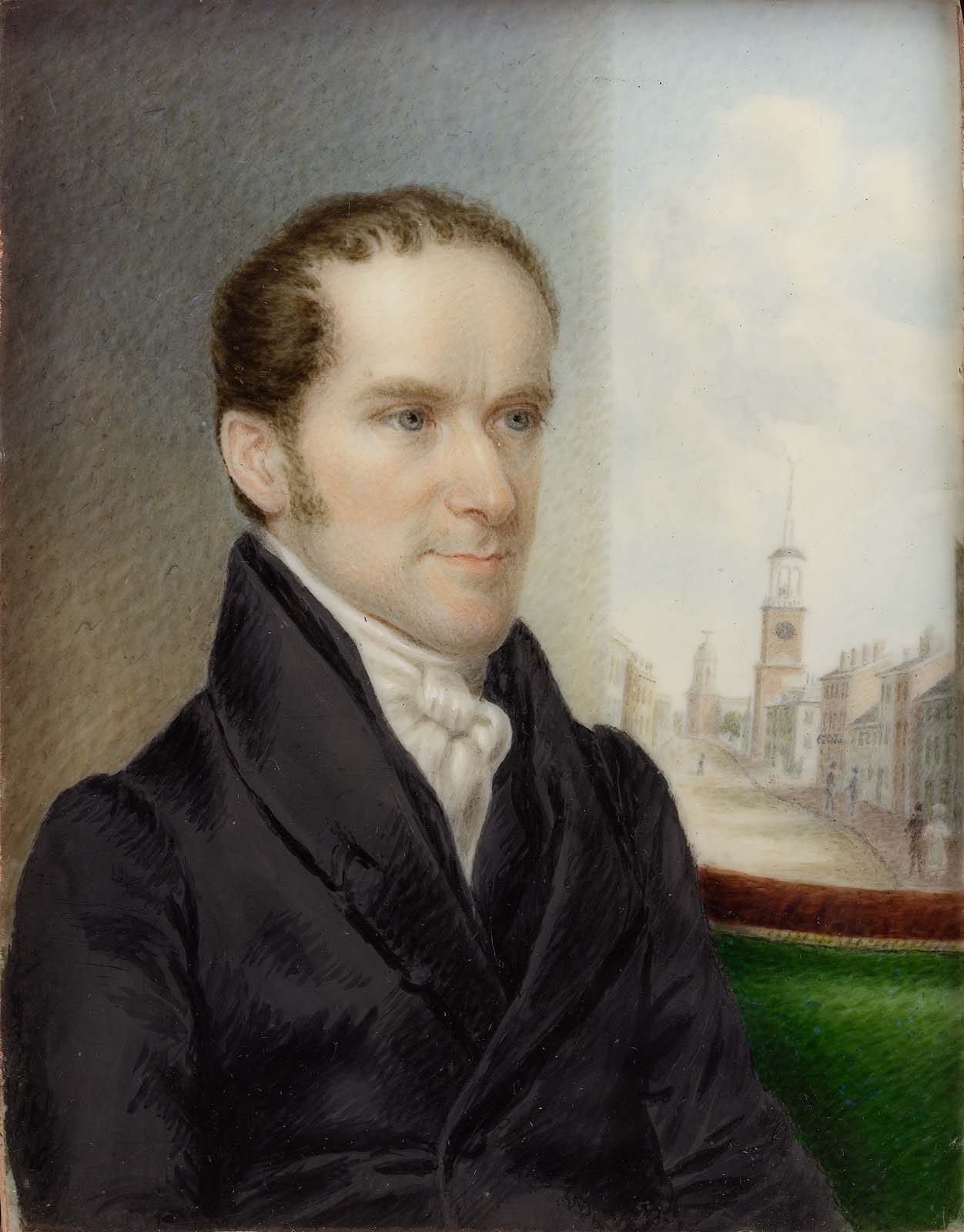
Henry Ware Jr.

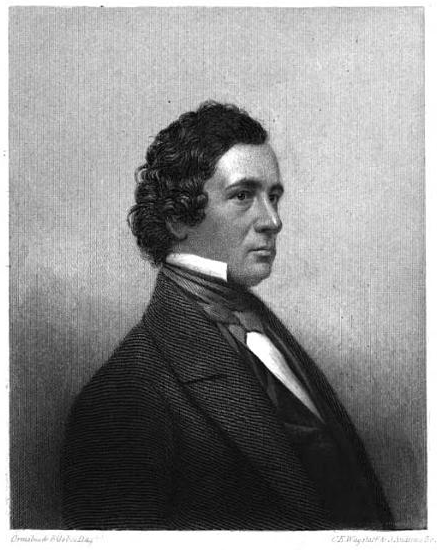
Chandler Robbins
