= George Burnham Ives =

American bibliographer, editor, and translator (1856–1930)

George Burnham Ives (1856-1930) was an American bibliographer, editor, and translator.

== Early life ==
He was a member of Salem's Pickering family. Ives was a summa cum laude graduate of Harvard Law School.

== Career ==
He became the Assistant District Attorney of Essex County. On May 12, 1890, Ives pleaded guilty to charges of embezzlement and forgery, having been caught misappropriating tens of thousands of dollars from various trust funds as well as squandering his wife's inheritance. He was sentenced to 8 1/2 years in Charlestown Prison and was disbarred.

While in prison, Ives developed a second career as a translator. After his release, he became a distinguished and prolific literary translator, translating works by Balzac, Daudet, Gautier, Hugo, Maupassant, Mérimée, Sand and others into English. He edited an edition of the essays of Montaigne (the infamous "fig leaf" edition). In later life, Ives produced the first comprehensive bibliography of the works of Oliver Wendell Holmes and worked as an editor at The Atlantic Monthly.

== Works ==
=== Author ===
1921 Text, Type and Style: A Compendium of Atlantic Usage

=== Bibliographer ===
1907 A Bibliography of Oliver Wendell Holmes
