= Kents Hill, Maine =

Coordinates: 44°24′18″N 70°00′03″W

Kents Hill is an unincorporated village in the northwestern corner of the town of Readfield in Kennebec County, Maine, United States, east of the town of Fayette, with which the village shares a zip code (04349).

The village's name comes from the farmer who owned the land before Luther Sampson bought it to start Kents Hill School.

The village is home to the Kents Hill School.
