= Winter Street School =

- U.S. National Register of Historic Places
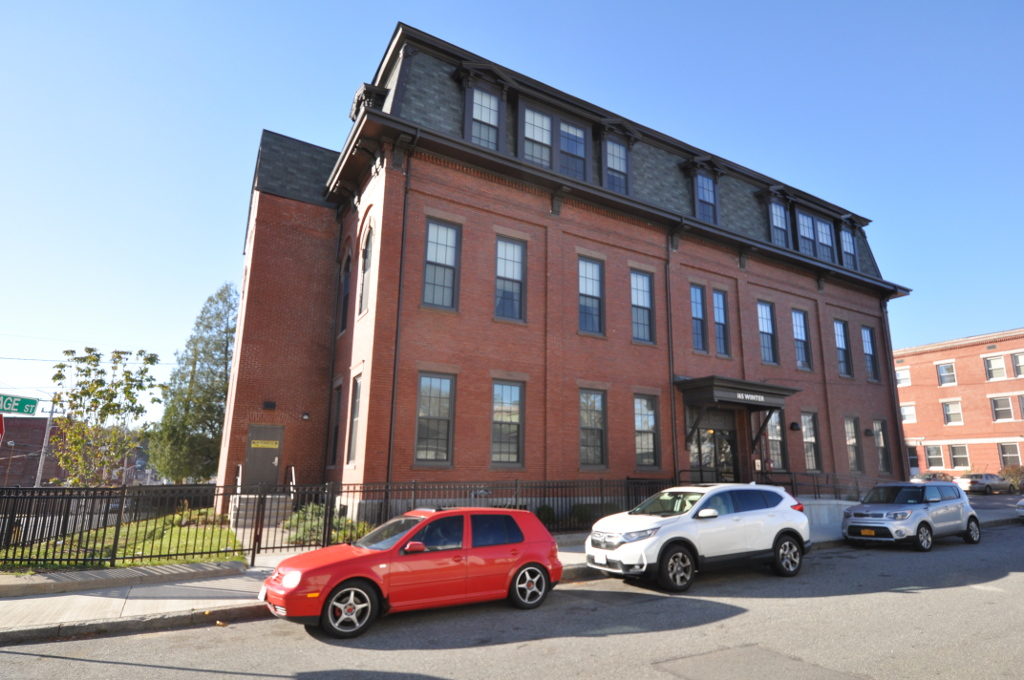

- Location within Massachusetts Location within the United States
- Location: 165 Winter St., Haverhill, Massachusetts
- Coordinates: 42°46′40″N 71°5′2″W
- Area: less than one acre
- Built: 1856
- Architectural style: Second Empire
- NRHP reference No.: 100000849
- Added to NRHP: April 10, 2017

The Winter Street School is a historic school building at 165 Winter Street in Haverhill, Massachusetts. Built in 1856, it is one of the city's oldest surviving school buildings, and a good local example of Second Empire/Italianate architecture. The building was listed on the National Register of Historic Places in 1986. The building has been converted into apartments.

== Description and history ==
The Winter Street School is located on the north side of Winter Street, north of downtown Haverhill, at the northwest corner with Cottage Street. It is a three-story rectangular masonry structure, built out of red brick set on a granite stone foundation. The third floor is under a mansard roof, with heavy paired brackets under the eaves. The main facade faces Cottage Street, and is ten bays wide. Bays are broken up in pairs by brick pilasters, with window bays rectangular with stone sills and lintels. The main entrance occupies the center two bays, sheltered by a hood supported by angle brackets and featuring an entablature and projecting cornice. The side elevations each have a projecting stairwell at the center, with second-floor windows set in round-arch openings in recessed round-arch panels.

The school was built in 1856, in order to consolidate two smaller area schools and accommodate Haverhill's growing population. It is one of two schools built by the city that year that is still standing; the other is the School Street School. Both are among the oldest of the city's surviving school buildings. This one was formally dedicated by George S. Boutwell, then the state's Secretary of the Board of Education. Originally two stories in height, the mansard roof was added about 1873, in response to continued growth and overcrowding. The school was closed in the 1970s and converted to a community center for people with disabilities. The city sold the building in 2014, after which it underwent conversion to apartments.

== See also ==
- National Register of Historic Places listings in Essex County, Massachusetts
