= Southwick House (Peabody, Massachusetts) =

Historic house in Massachusetts, United States

- U.S. National Register of Historic Places
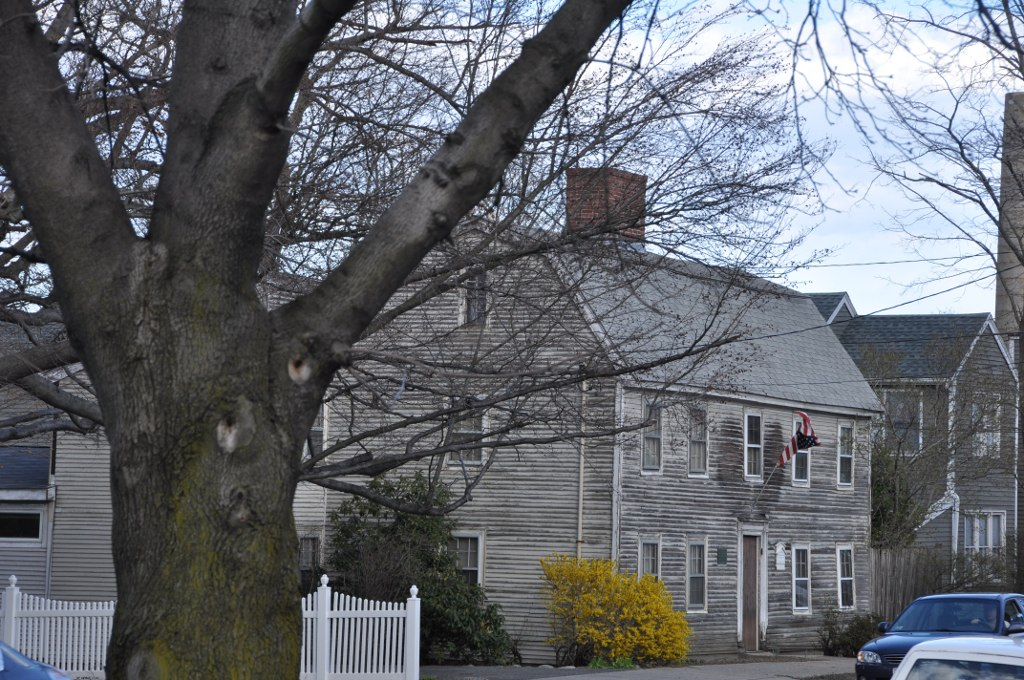

- Location within Massachusetts Location within the United States
- Location: 151 Lowell St., Peabody, Massachusetts
- Coordinates: 42°31′50″N 70°56′12″W
- Area: 1 acre (0.40 ha)
- Built: 1750
- Architectural style: Georgian
- NRHP reference No.: 83003974
- Added to NRHP: November 29, 1983

The Southwick House is a historic house in Peabody, Massachusetts. Probably built about 1750, it is one of the city's oldest surviving structures, and has a long association with a prominent local family. The house was listed on the National Register of Historic Places in 1983.

== Description and history ==
The Southwick House is located west of downtown Peabody, on the north side of Lowell Street just west of its junction with Southwick Road. It is a 2 1/2-story wood-frame structure, with a gambrel roof, central chimney, and clapboarded exterior. Its main facade is five bays wide but slightly asymmetrical, with a center entrance framed by simply moulded corner boards with rosette blocks at the tops. An ell, built soon after the main block, extends along the rear, giving the house a saltbox profile, and extending beyond the sides of the main block by one bay in what is locally known as a "Beverly jog". The interior follows a typical center chimney plan, with parlors on either side of the chimney, and the kitchen behind. There are many original period finishes on the interior, including floorboards, paneling, and trim.

The house was traditionally claimed to be built about 1660, but was more likely built about 1750, possibly on the side of an earlier building. The land was first settled by John Southwick, a persecuted Quaker who had been banished from Danvers for his beliefs. The Southwick family became a significant presence in what is now Peabody, operating a tavern and becoming one of its largest landowners. In the 19th century they became involved in the manufacture of pottery, and in the tanning business. This house remained in the family until 1816.

== See also ==
- National Register of Historic Places listings in Essex County, Massachusetts
