= Seaside Park (Marblehead, Massachusetts) =

- U.S. National Register of Historic Places
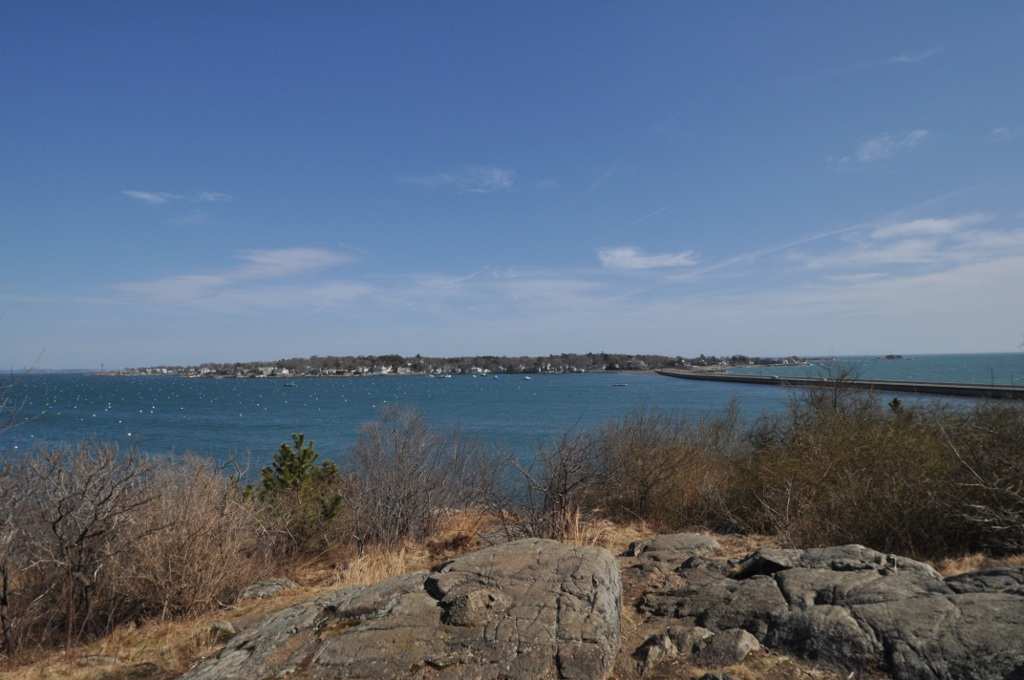

- Location within Massachusetts
- Location: Marblehead, Massachusetts
- Coordinates: 42°29′46″N 70°51′30″W
- NRHP reference No.: 11000333
- Added to NRHP: June 8, 2011

Seaside Park is a coastal park located in Marblehead, Massachusetts. At a little over 14 acres (5.7 ha), it is the largest of Marblehead's four public parks, and includes an early 20th century grandstand overlooking the baseball field. At its eastern edge, it provides fine views of Marblehead Harbor and Marblehead Neck. The park was listed on the National Register of Historic Places on June 8, 2011.

== Setting ==
Seaside Park is located on the east side of Marblehead, occupying a parcel of land bounded on the west by Atlantic Avenue, the north by Chestnut Street, the east by Harbor View Lane and Ladys Cove, and on the south by Wyman Lane. Its principal points of access are from Atlantic Avenue, with the other roads lined by mainly residential properties. The portion of the park nearest Atlantic Avenue is flat, and has developed athletic facilities, including a paved basketball court, and a baseball diamond whose outfield area is large enough for use as a football or soccer field. Behind the diamond is the Roundy Grandstand, and tennis courts and a playground extend north, behind the adjacent Our Lady Star of the Sea church complex. Behind the grandstand and tennis courts the land rises into a wooded area, through which trails circulate and lead toward the shore. Views of Ladys Cove and Marblehead Neck are only obtained from the easternmost part of the park, the higher rocky outcrops having been obscured by trees.

== History ==
Marblehead's first three parks, Crocker Park, Bailey's Headland, and Fort Sewall, were established between 1886 and 1890. The first land for Seaside Park was acquired in 1895, with the plan to develop it as a site for athletic activities. The inland portion, eventually increased by further acquisitions, was levelled and seeded, and improvements began to be added in the 1910s. The grandstand was built in 1916, in part at the request of a local semi-pro baseball league. The park was visited by President Calvin Coolidge when he summered at Marblehead in 1925. The first tennis courts were added in the 1930s, as was an ice skating rink, whose space has since taken over by more tennis courts. Lucille Ball landed on the baseball field in a helicopter. The grandstand underwent a major restoration in 1990. Pickleball courts were added in 2022.

== See also ==
- National Register of Historic Places listings in Essex County, Massachusetts
