= Henfield House =

Historic house in Massachusetts, United States

- U.S. National Register of Historic Places
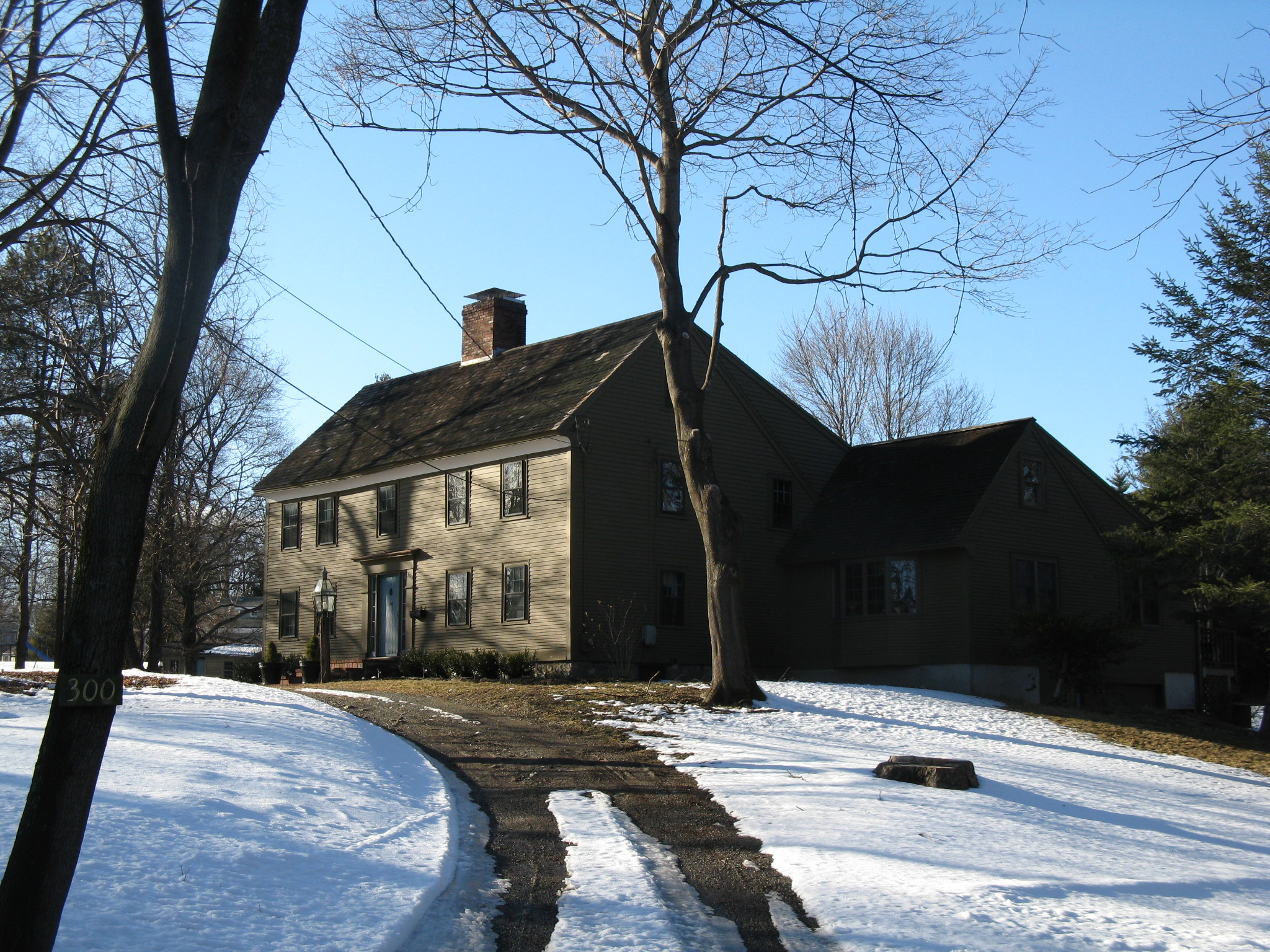
- Henfield House

- Location within Massachusetts Location within the United States
- Location: 300 Main Street, Lynnfield, Massachusetts
- Coordinates: 42°32′6″N 71°3′34″W
- Built: 1700
- Architectural style: Colonial
- MPS: First Period Buildings of Eastern Massachusetts TR
- NRHP reference No.: 90000240
- Added to NRHP: March 4, 1991

The Henfield House is a historic First Period house located in Lynnfield, Massachusetts. The oldest portion of this 2.5-story saltbox colonial was built c. 1700; this consisted of the right side of the house (including the shed section to its rear) and the central chimney. The left side was built early in the 18th century. The only other major modification was the addition of a shed dormer in the early 20th century, and some single story extensions at the rear of the house on the east side. The house is named after the Henfield family, who owned it for much of the 18th century.

The house was listed on the National Register of Historic Places in 1991.

== See also ==
- National Register of Historic Places listings in Essex County, Massachusetts
