= Fish Flake Hill Historic District =

Historic district in Massachusetts, United States

- U.S. National Register of Historic Places
- U.S. Historic district
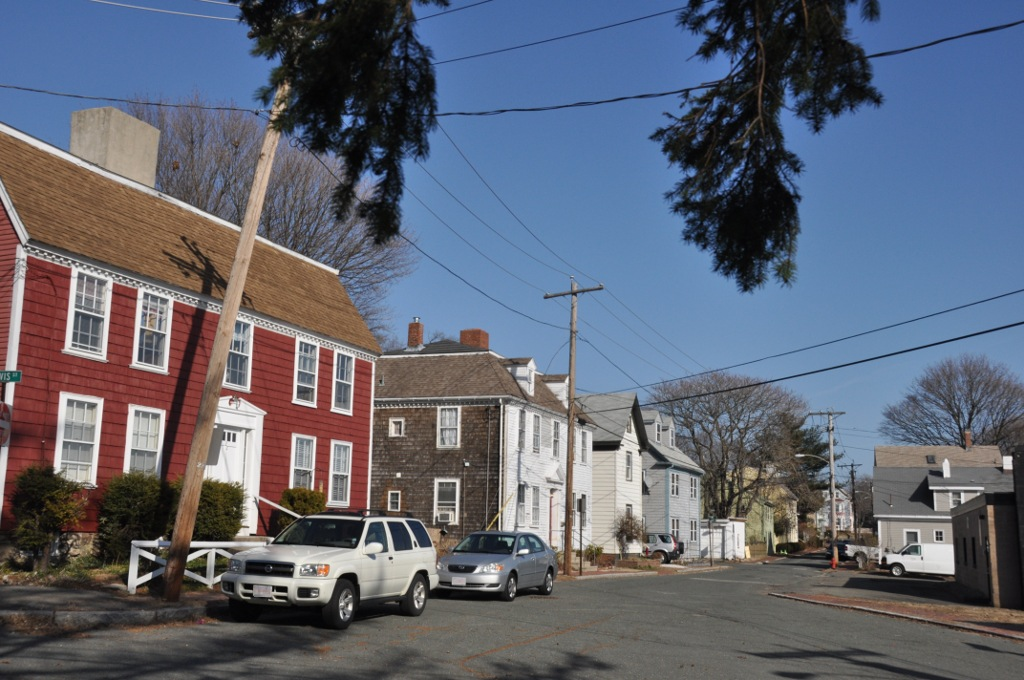
- Front Street

- Location within Massachusetts Location within the United States
- Location: Beverly, Massachusetts
- Coordinates: 42°32′29″N 70°53′2″W
- Built: 1641
- Architectural style: Colonial, Federal
- NRHP reference No.: 71000082 (original); 86001375 (increase)

Significant dates
- Added to NRHP: October 26, 1971
- Boundary increase: June 26, 1986

The Fish Flake Hill Historic District encompasses a section of Front Street in Beverly, Massachusetts that includes a remarkable concentration of colonial buildings, and which was notable for its importance in the American Revolutionary War. The district, which was listed on the National Register of Historic Places in 1971, includes properties on both sides of Front Street between Cabot and Bartlett Streets. It includes houses dating to the middle 18th century, sixteen of which have been documented as being associated with ship captains active in the American Revolutionary War. The port area of Beverly was one of the most active during the war, and was one of the places where many captured ships were brought.

== History ==
The district is the oldest neighborhood in Beverly, founded in 1626 when Roger Conant led a group of settlers from Salem. The name of the district comes "from the 'flakes' or fish drying tables of the fish drying yards, which were found here until the late 19th century." The city created the district in 1971 and contains 152 properties on 35 acres.,

== See also ==
- National Register of Historic Places listings in Essex County, Massachusetts
