= Sutton Block =

- U.S. National Register of Historic Places
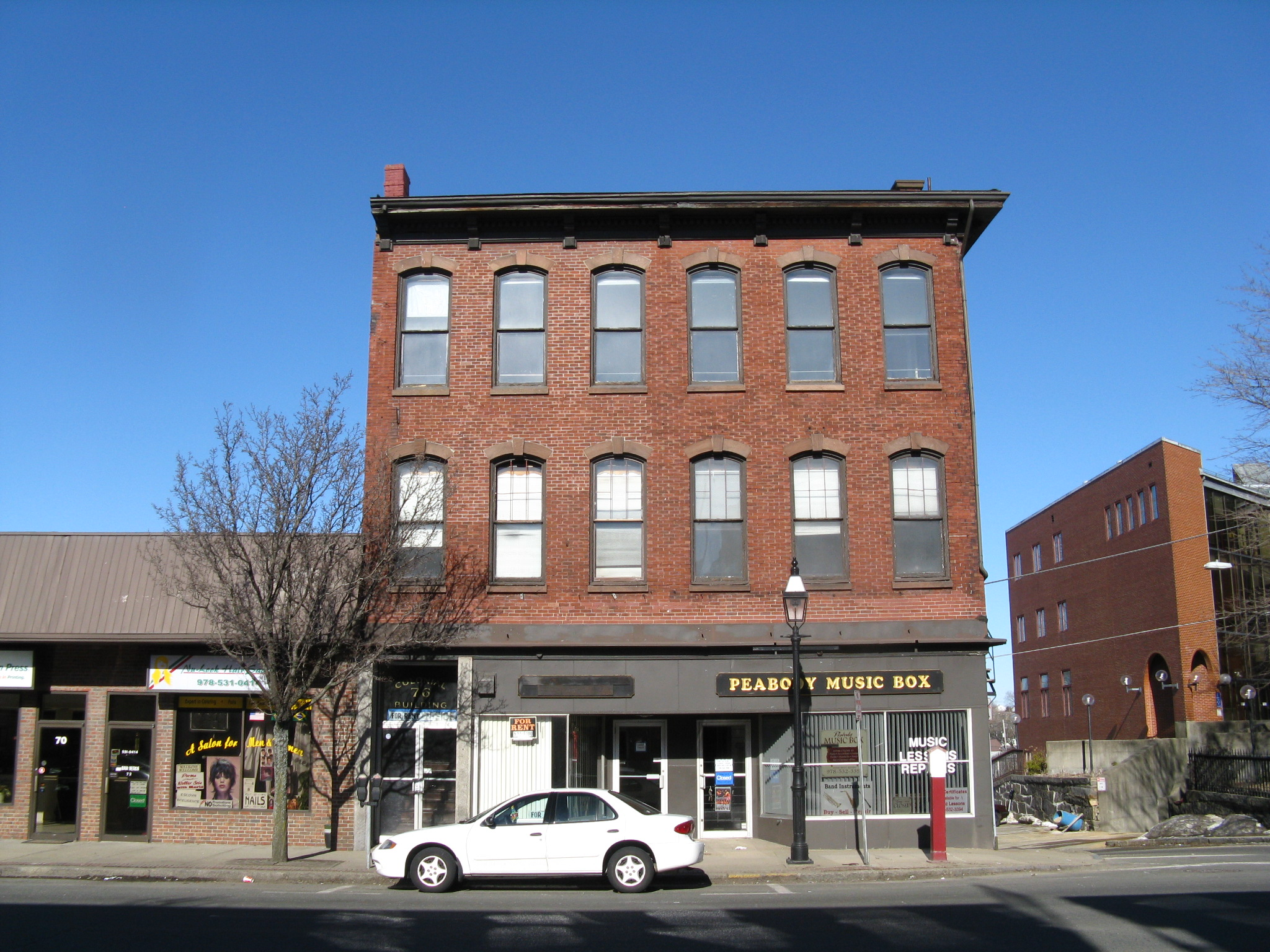
- Sutton Block

- Location within Massachusetts Location within the United States
- Location: 76–78 Main Street, Peabody, Massachusetts
- Coordinates: 42°31′30″N 70°55′32″W
- Built: 1859
- Architectural style: Italianate
- NRHP reference No.: 85002012
- Added to NRHP: September 5, 1985

The Sutton Block is a historic commercial building in Peabody, Massachusetts. Built in 1859, this three story brick building is the only Italianate commercial building in Peabody. It was built by Ebenezer Sutton, a local textile manufacturer. The building originally had a steeply pitched roof, but this was removed sometime after 1877. Its first floor facade may also have been compromised by retail-related alterations, but original details may survive under the current finish. The building was designed to house retail spaces on the ground floor, offices on the second floor, and a social venue (at first the Knights of Pythias) on the third floor.

The building was listed on the National Register of Historic Places in 1985.

== See also ==
- National Register of Historic Places listings in Essex County, Massachusetts
