= Hazadiah Smith House =

Historic house in Massachusetts, United States

- U.S. National Register of Historic Places
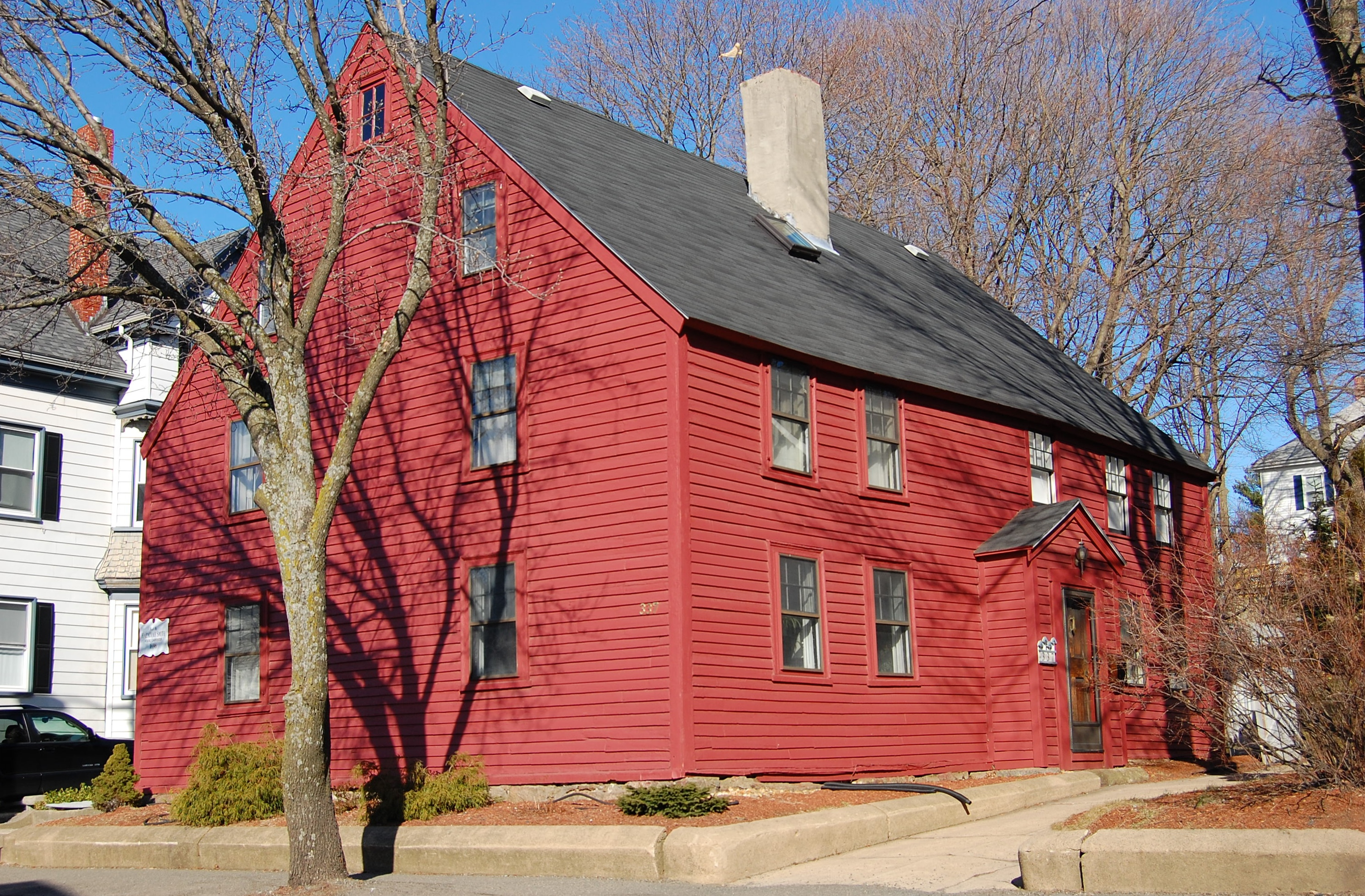
- Hazadiah Smith House

- Location within Massachusetts Location within the United States
- Location: 337 Cabot Street, Beverly, Massachusetts
- Coordinates: 42°33′16″N 70°52′43″W
- Built: 1686
- Architectural style: Colonial
- MPS: First Period Buildings of Eastern Massachusetts TR
- NRHP reference No.: 90000200
- Added to NRHP: March 9, 1990

The Hazadiah Smith House is a historic First Period house in Beverly, Massachusetts. The 2.5-story wood-frame house was built c. 1686, probably by Hazadiah Smith, whose profession is frequently listed in contemporary records as a builder or housewright. It is possible that he was responsible for a number of surviving First Period houses that survive in Beverly. This particular house, which he is believed to have lived in, was built with a two cell center chimney plan, and then extended to the rear at a later date, replacing the roof and leaving the chimney protruding from the front roof slope.

The house was listed on the National Register of Historic Places in 1990.

== See also ==
- List of the oldest buildings in Massachusetts
- National Register of Historic Places listings in Essex County, Massachusetts
