= Rockport Downtown Main Street Historic District =

Historic district in Massachusetts, United States

- U.S. National Register of Historic Places
- U.S. Historic district
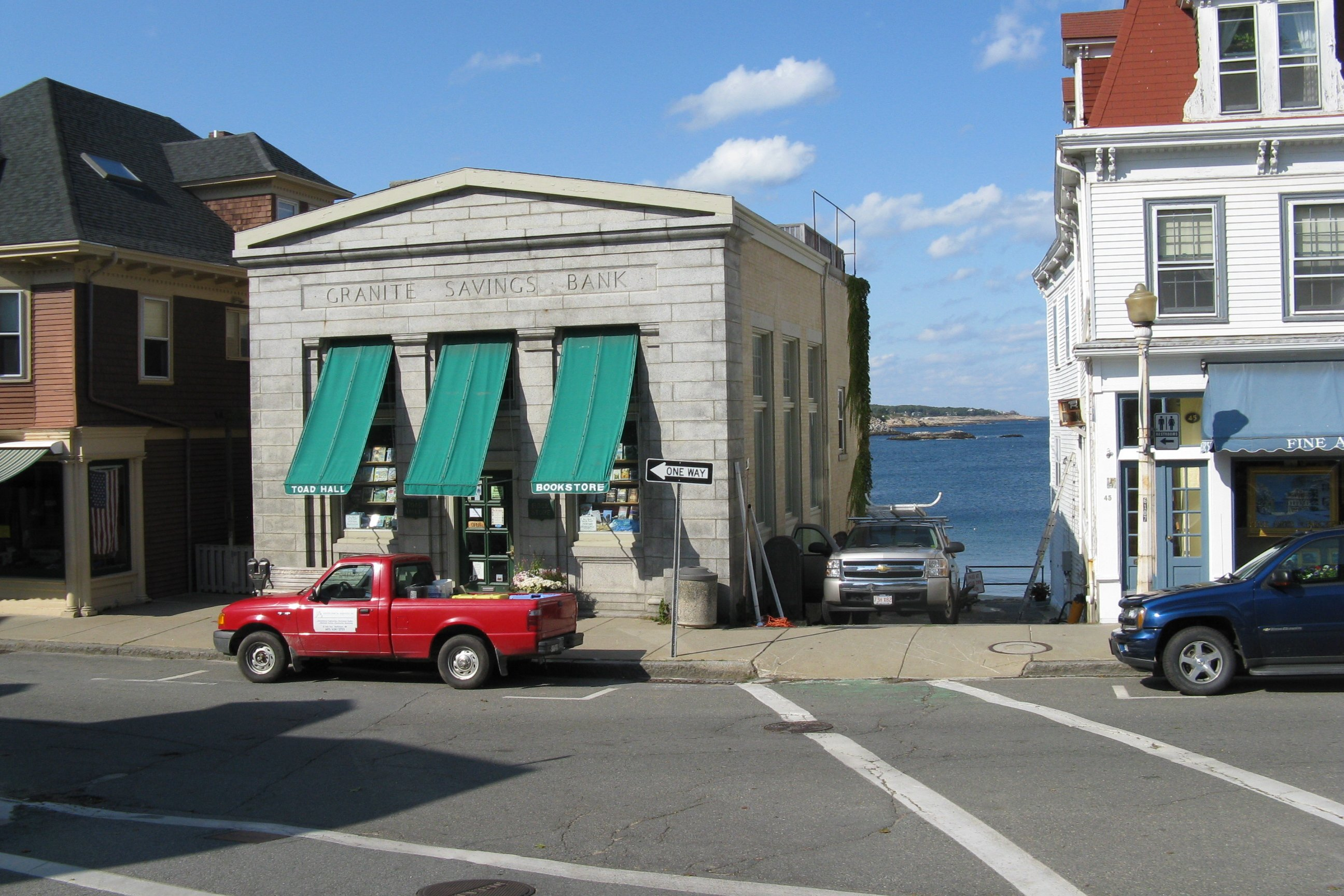
- Granite Savings Bank

- Location within Massachusetts Location within the United States
- Location: Rockport, Massachusetts
- Coordinates: 42°39′29″N 70°37′11″W
- Built: 1753
- Architectural style: Italianate, Romanesque, Federal
- NRHP reference No.: 76000288
- Added to NRHP: May 28, 1976

The Rockport Downtown Main Street Historic District encompasses part of the historic center of Rockport, Massachusetts. The district extends along Main Street, from its junction with Beach Street in the west to just east of its junction with School Street. The area is just west of Rockport's noted Bearskin Neck area. Most of the 28 properties in the district are commercial buildings; there are also three churches, a library, and a number of residences. Only a few of these properties front on the side streets adjacent to Main Street; all abut Main Street. The central focal point of the district is the First Congregational Church, built 1803, and the adjacent Federal style Jewett House, a pastor's residence built in 1806. Most of the commercial buildings are modest in scale (two or three stories), and are in a variety of building styles popular in the 19th century.

The district was listed on the National Register of Historic Places in 1976.

== See also ==
- National Register of Historic Places listings in Essex County, Massachusetts
