= Story Grammar School =

- U.S. National Register of Historic Places
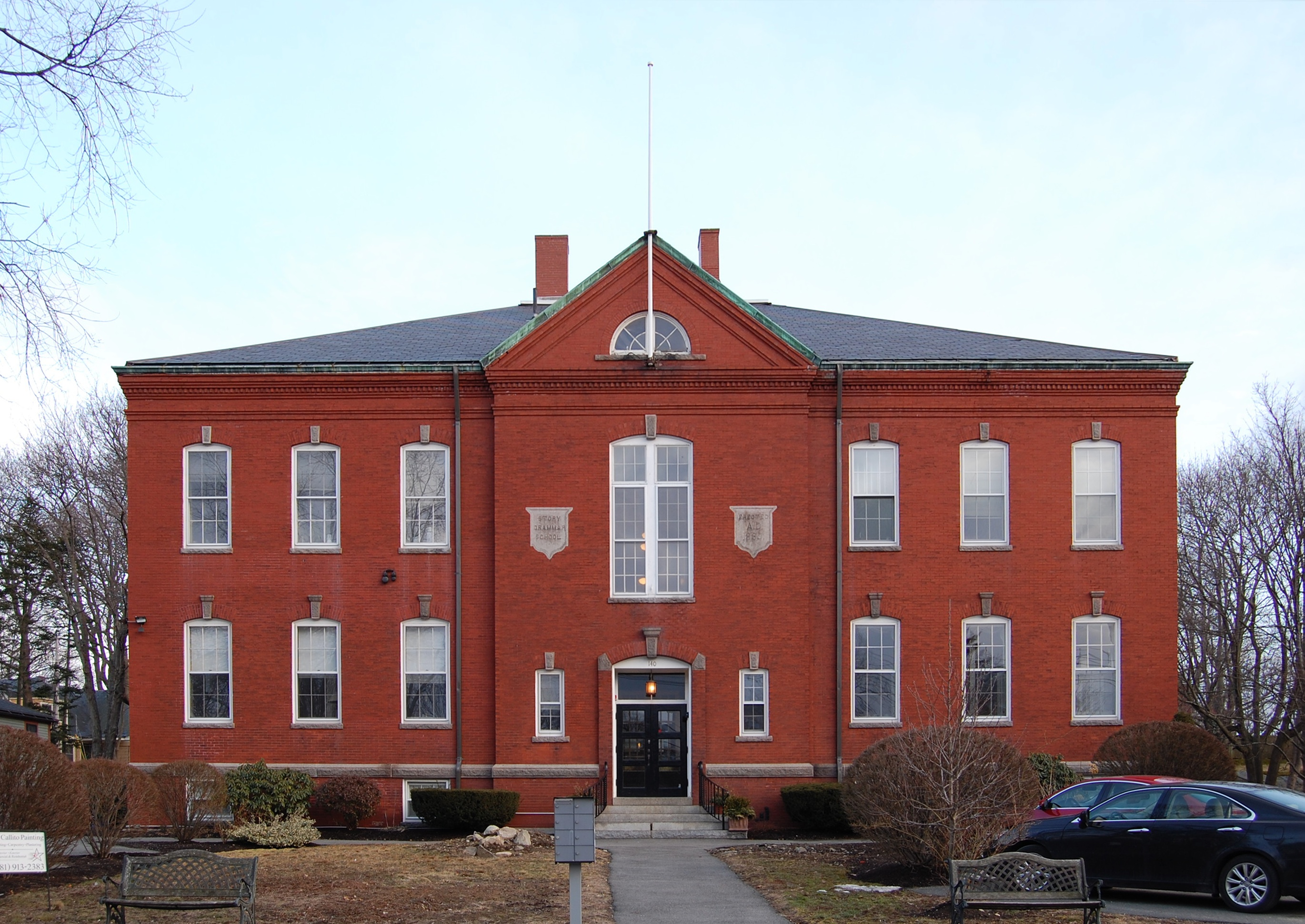
- Story Grammar School on Elm Street, est. 1880

- Location within Massachusetts Location within the United States
- Location: 140 Elm St., Marblehead, Massachusetts
- Coordinates: 42°30′16″N 70°51′19″W
- Built: 1880
- Architectural style: Colonial Revival
- NRHP reference No.: 86000378
- Added to NRHP: March 13, 1986

The Story Grammar School is a historic school building at 140 Elm Street in Marblehead, Massachusetts. Built in 1880, it was the town's first modern graded school, and is a prominent local example of Colonial Revival architecture. It was named for a native son, United States Supreme Court Justice Joseph Story, and served as a public school until 1978. It is now in residential use. it was listed on the National Register of Historic Places in 1986.

== Description and history ==
The former Story School is located north of downtown Marblehead, on the southeast side of Elm Street opposite its junction with Curtis Street. Now predominantly residential, the area was until an 1877 fire an industrial area with many small shoe factories. It is a two-story red brick building, with a hip roof and Colonial Revival styling. Windows are set in segmented-arch openings with keystones at the tops, and there is a gabled pedimented in the roof above the main entrance, in a section that projects slightly. The entrance, a double door, is also set in a segmented-arch opening, with a large single-pane transom window. Above the entrance is a tall doubled three-sash window. The rear facade is similar to the front, but with simpler detailing and lacking the projecting center section.

Early education in Marblehead was largely conducted in private homes of teachers or other such facilities, with college preparation typically taking place at the private Marblehead Academy, founded in 1789 by Dr. Elisha Story and others. In the first half of the 19th century, the town established a series of district schools, including one at the site of this building. In the 1870s, the town's population surged, buoyed by local shoe manufacturing industry, increasing pressure on the town to improve its educational infrastructure. This building, completed in 1880, was the first brick school built by the town, and its first major investment in improved education. It was named for Joseph Story, the son of Dr. Elisha Story and a noted associate justice of the United States Supreme Court. The school served the town until 1978, and was then converted into residential units.

== See also ==
- National Register of Historic Places listings in Essex County, Massachusetts
