= Samuel Frye House =

Historic house in Massachusetts, United States

- U.S. National Register of Historic Places
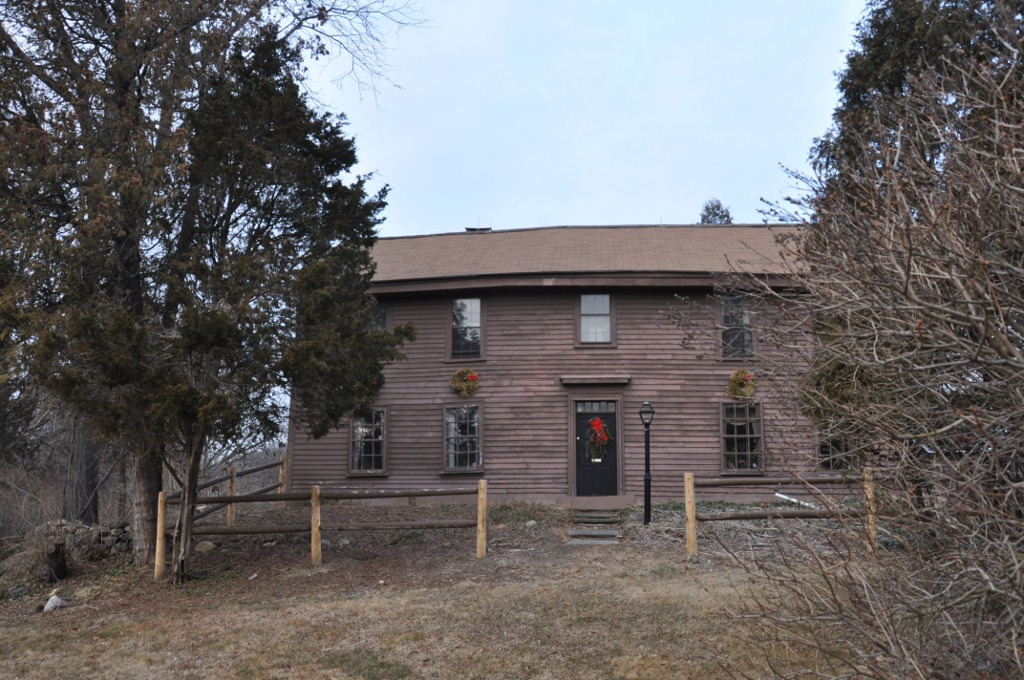

- Location within Massachusetts Location within the United States
- Location: 920 Turnpike Street, North Andover, Massachusetts
- Coordinates: 42°39′25″N 71°6′14″W
- Built: 1711
- Architectural style: Colonial
- MPS: First Period Buildings of Eastern Massachusetts TR
- NRHP reference No.: 90000252
- Added to NRHP: March 9, 1990

Samuel Frye (or Frie) House is a historic First Period house in North Andover, Massachusetts. Tradition places its construction between 1711, when a previous house on the site burned down, and 1719, when Frye gave the property, with house, to his son. The house was in the Frye family until 1880. It is a 2 1/2-story wood-frame house, one room deep and five bays wide, with a rear leanto section that was added in the 19th century. The house is notable for its retention of a tradition two room form despite the removal of its central chimney during Federal period renovations.

The property was listed on the National Register of Historic Places in 1990.

== See also ==
- National Register of Historic Places listings in Essex County, Massachusetts
- List of the oldest buildings in Massachusetts
