= Beverly Grammar School =

- U.S. National Register of Historic Places
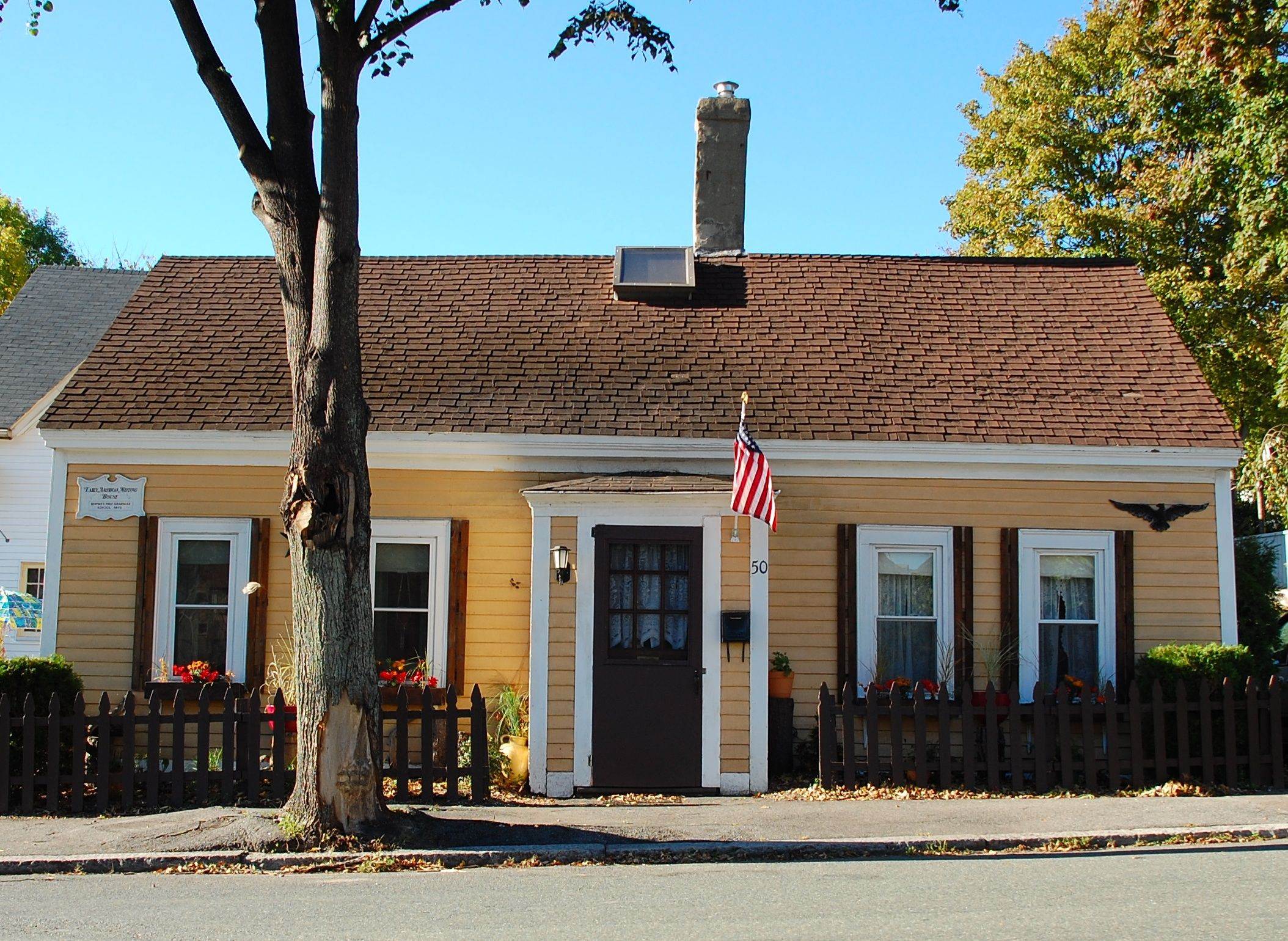
- Beverly Grammar School at 50 Essex

- Location within Massachusetts Location within the United States
- Location: 50 Essex St., Beverly, Massachusetts
- Coordinates: 42°33′6″N 70°52′34″W
- Built: 1716
- Architectural style: Colonial
- MPS: First Period Buildings of Eastern Massachusetts TR
- NRHP reference No.: 90000198
- Added to NRHP: March 9, 1990

The Beverly Grammar School is a rare historic First Period schoolhouse in Beverly, Massachusetts, USA. The building, now a modest private residence, contains internal evidence that part of it was built c. 1716 for use as a schoolhouse. It was listed on the National Register of Historic Places in 1990.

== Description and history ==
The former Beverly Grammar School building is located in a mainly residential area just north of downtown Beverly, on the west side of Essex Street between Charnock and Monroe Streets. It is a small single-story wood-frame structure, with a side gable roof, central chimney, and clapboarded exterior. It has a five-bay front facade, with narrow one-over-one sash windows in the outer bays, and a projecting entry vestibule at the center. The interior consists of two chambers, a larger one on the left and a smaller one to the right.

The building's internal structure is consistent with documentary evidence that its left side was built about 1716 as a schoolhouse. It has no evidence that it was built with a chimney (the present one was added in the 19th century for a stove), and the right-side chamber is a later 18th-century addition. Portions of the lath on the right side are decorated with what appear to be drawings by children, a suggestion that they were originally part of pupils' desks.

== See also ==
- National Register of Historic Places listings in Essex County, Massachusetts
