= Union Congregational Church (Amesbury, Massachusetts) =

Historic church in Massachusetts, United States

- U.S. National Register of Historic Places
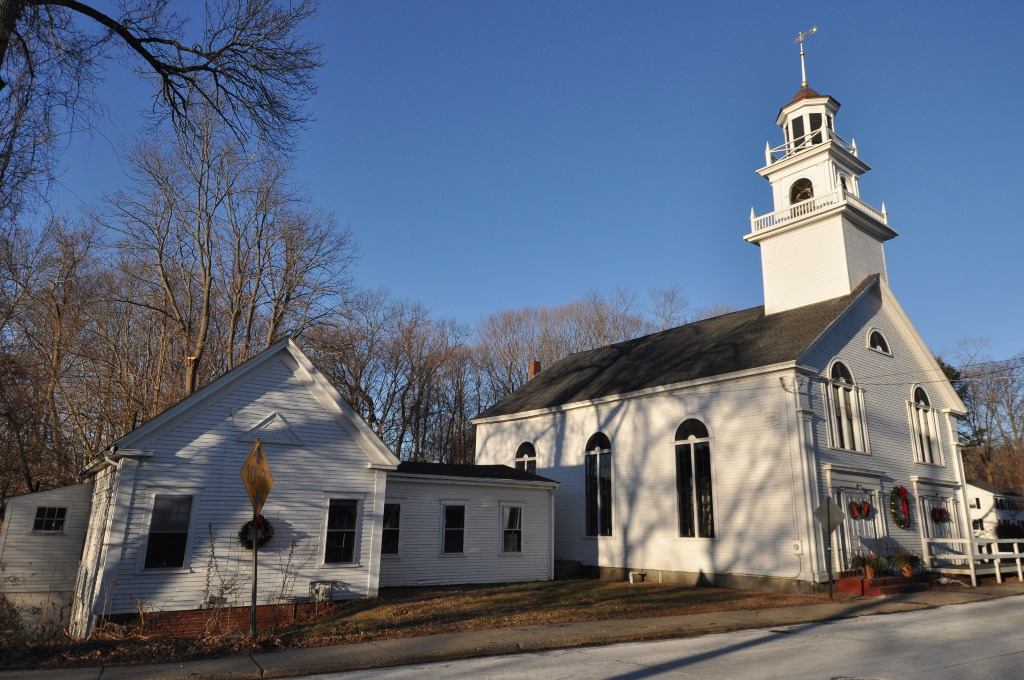

- Location within Massachusetts Location within the United States
- Location: Amesbury, Massachusetts
- Coordinates: 42°50′30″N 70°55′26″W
- Built: 1835
- Architectural style: Greek Revival
- NRHP reference No.: 14000894
- Added to NRHP: November 5, 2014

The Union Congregational Church is a historic church facility at 350-354 Main Street in the Salisbury Point section of Amesbury, Massachusetts. It is a two-story structure, set on a granite foundation, with a gable roof and a tower. The main facade has two symmetrically placed entrances, each flanked by sidelight windows and pilasters, and topped by an entablature. Palladian windows are located above each entry on the second level, and there is a small lunette in the gable end. The tower rises in stepped stages, starting with a square section, followed by an open belfry with round-arch openings and pilastered supports. Above the belfry is an octagonal section topped by a rounded cupola. The building, built in 1835, supposedly by local shipwrights, is an excellent local example of Greek Revival style. To its west is a vestry building, constructed in 1854, which was joined to the church in 1892 by adapting an old horse shed as a connector.

The building was added to the National Register of Historic Places in 2014.

== See also ==
- National Register of Historic Places listings in Essex County, Massachusetts
