= Bradford Burial Ground =

Historic site in Essex County, Massachusetts, US

- U.S. National Register of Historic Places
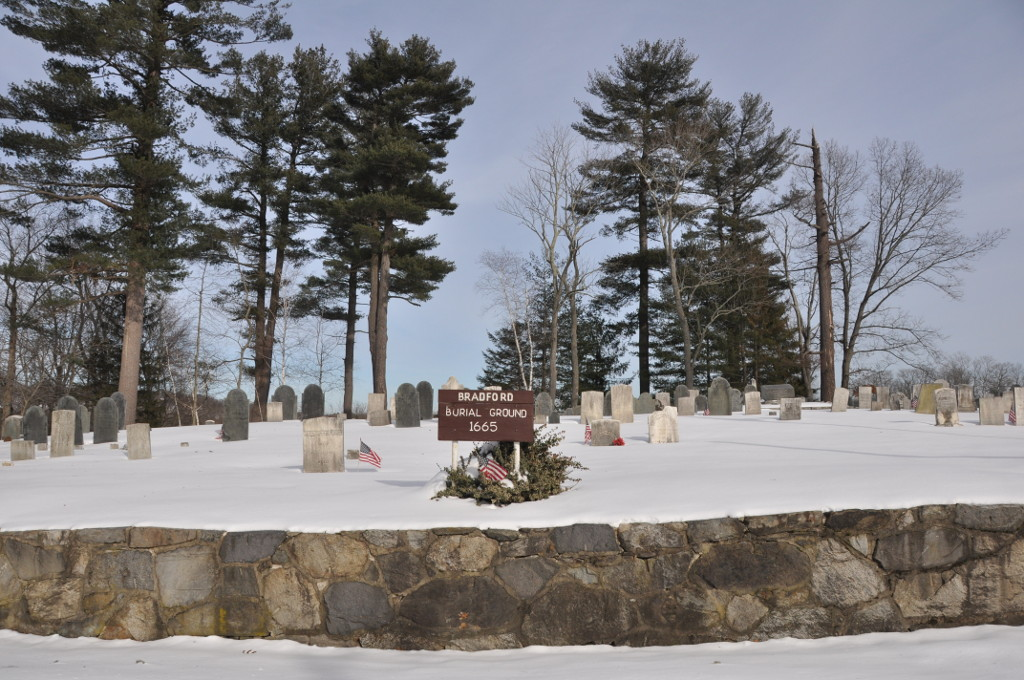

- Location within Massachusetts Location within the United States
- Location: 326 Salem Street, Haverhill, Massachusetts
- Coordinates: 42°45′34″N 71°3′50″W
- Area: 1.5 acres (0.61 ha)
- Built: 1665
- NRHP reference No.: 15000351
- Added to NRHP: June 15, 2015

The Bradford Burial Ground is a historic cemetery at 326 Salem Street in the Bradford section of Haverhill, Massachusetts. The 1.5-acre (0.61 ha) cemetery was established in 1665, on land given by John Heseltine to the town of Bradford. The oldest readable marker in the cemetery has a date of 1689, but there are likely to be older burials. The cemetery was listed on the National Register of Historic Places in 2015.

== Description and history ==
The Bradford Burial Ground is located to the southeast of the center of Bradford village, on the north side of Salem Street, a through road connecting Bradford to Georgetown. It is directly opposite Orchard Hill Road, and adjacent to the drive to the Bradford Swim Club. The land it occupies is roughly pentagonal in shape, and is fronted by a finished stone retaining wall, with a small flight if granite steps for access. The remaining sides of the cemetery are demarcated by fieldstone walls. The terrain is generally level but sloping gently downhill to the north, and is basically grass dotted with mature trees.

Most of the graves are arranged in a generally east-facing orientation, but this is not always exact, and there is one row of graves that faces north. The oldest graves are in the easternmost section. Although there are areas without any burial markers, ground-penetrating radar was used to identify at least 100 potential grave sites that lack markers. The most recent burials date to the 1950s.

The cemetery was established in 1665 by the early founders of Bradford, which was incorporated in 1672, and was annexed to Haverhill in the 19th century. It was the site of the town's first two colonial meeting houses (whose locations within the grounds are not known). Documented burials include four of the town's first five ministers, many of its early settlers, and war veterans from King Philip's War (1675–78) to the American Civil War (1861–65). The stone wall at the front was built as part of a Works Progress Administration project in the 1930s. The cemetery is now formally cared for by the city of Haverhill, although most of its maintenance is performed by volunteers.

== See also ==
- National Register of Historic Places listings in Essex County, Massachusetts
