= Peter Woodbury House =

Historic house in Massachusetts, United States

- U.S. National Register of Historic Places
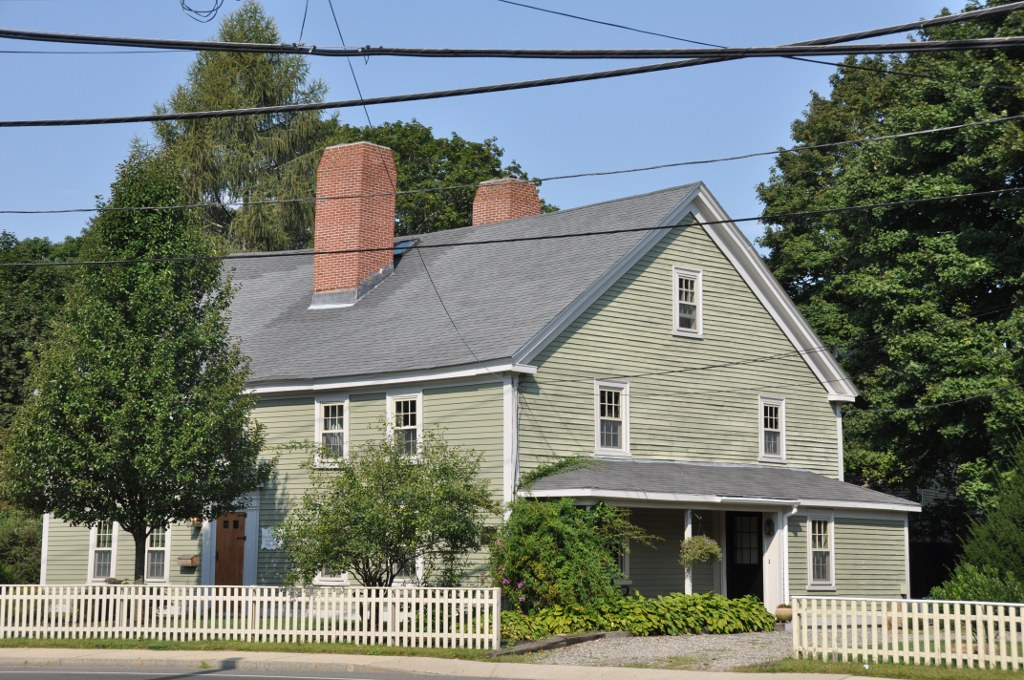

- Location within Massachusetts Location within the United States
- Location: 82 Dodge Street, Beverly, Massachusetts
- Coordinates: 42°34′42″N 70°53′22″W
- Built: 1696
- Architectural style: Colonial
- MPS: First Period Buildings of Eastern Massachusetts TR
- NRHP reference No.: 90000201
- Added to NRHP: March 9, 1990

The Peter Woodbury House (or Woodberry) is a historic First Period house in Beverly, Massachusetts. It is a 2 1/2-story wood-frame structure, five bays wide, with a side-gable roof, large central chimney, and clapboard siding. Like most surviving First Period houses, this one was built in stages. The earliest part, dating to c. 1696, was the right front section and chimney. The left side was built in the 18th century, as was the rear leanto, which was later raised to a full second story.

The house was listed on the National Register of Historic Places in 1990.

== See also ==
- National Register of Historic Places listings in Essex County, Massachusetts
