= Amesbury and Salisbury Mills Village Historic District =

Historic district in Massachusetts, United States

- U.S. National Register of Historic Places
- U.S. Historic district
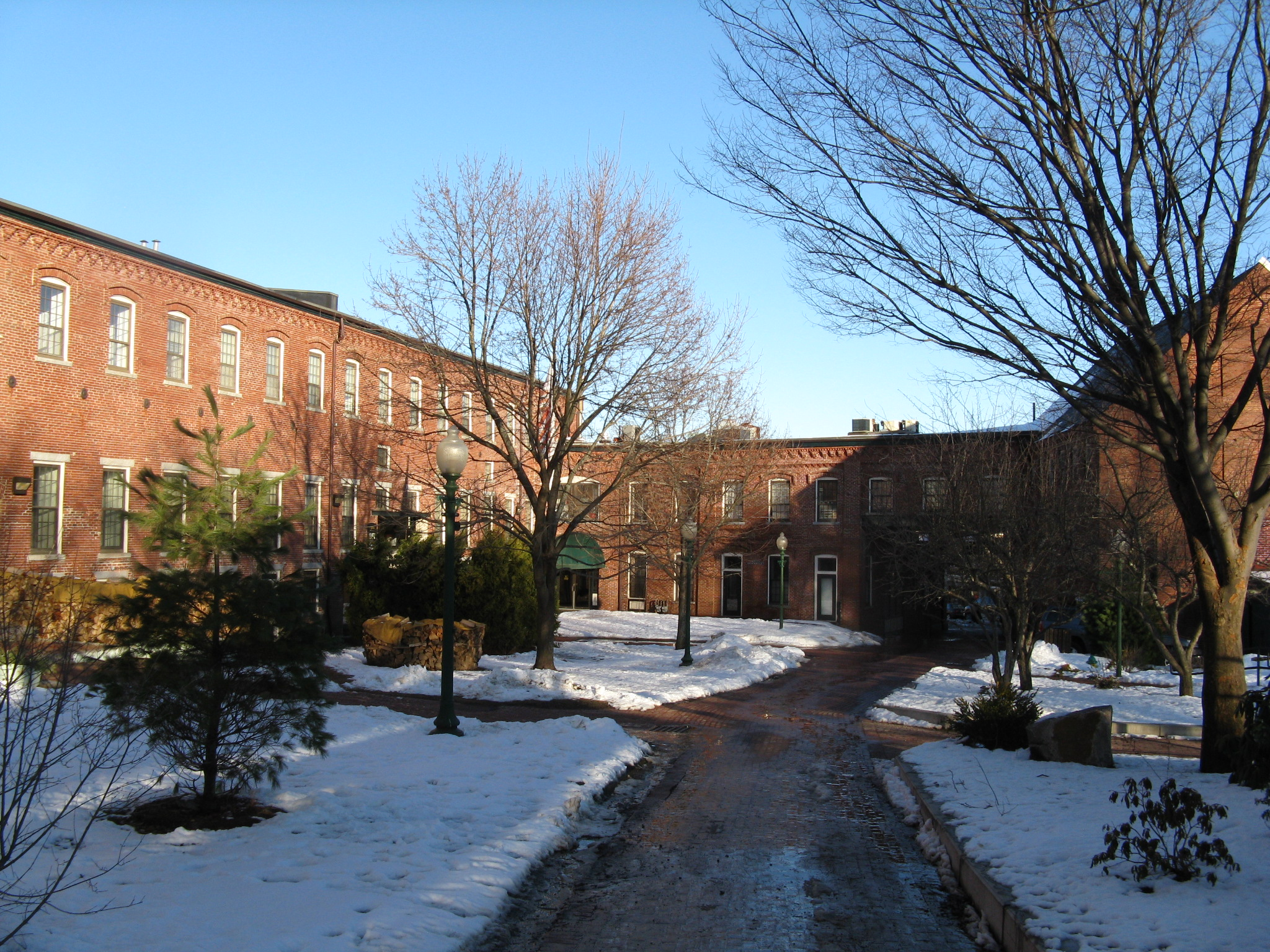
- The Millyard

- Location within Massachusetts Location within the United States
- Location: Amesbury, Massachusetts
- Coordinates: 42°51′28″N 70°55′52″W
- Architect: Multiple
- Architectural style: Late Victorian
- NRHP reference No.: 85001121
- Added to NRHP: May 16, 1985

The Amesbury and Salisbury Mills Village Historic District is a historic district on Market Sq. roughly bounded by Boardman, Water, Main and Pond Streets in Amesbury, Massachusetts. It was the site of significant industrial development between 1800 and 1875, during which time the town developed a significant textile processing industry. Among the buildings in the district is the Salisbury Mill #4, a four-story brick Greek Revival building which features dentil decorations on its eaves and towers.

The district was listed on the National Register of Historic Places in 1985.

== See also ==
- National Register of Historic Places listings in Essex County, Massachusetts
