= L. H. Hamel Leather Company Historic District =

Historic district in Massachusetts, United States

- U.S. National Register of Historic Places
- U.S. Historic district
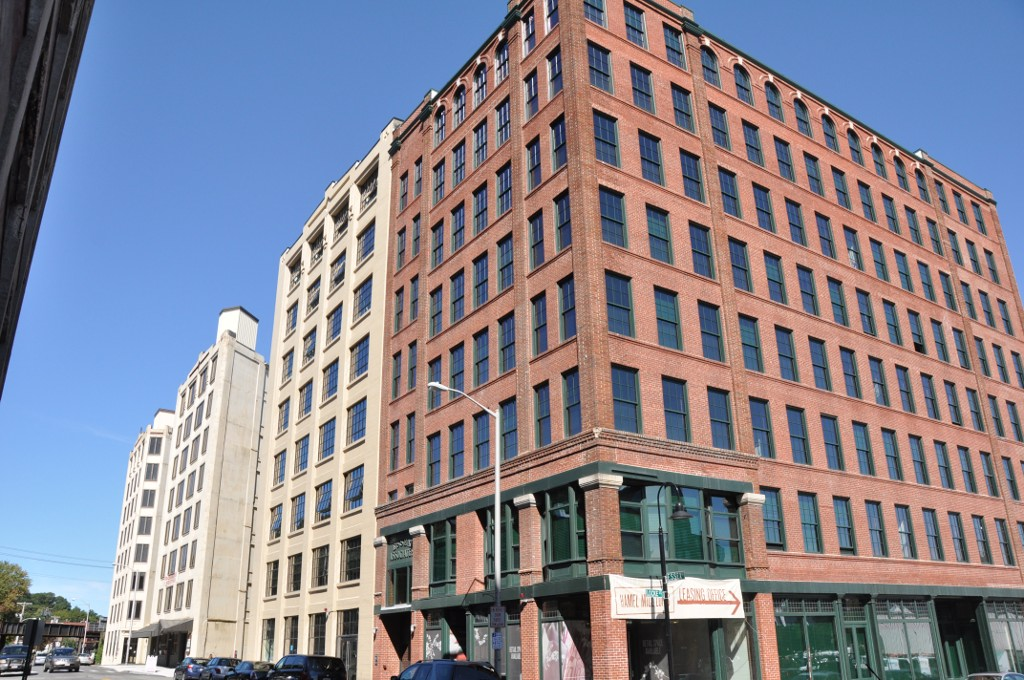
- Former Hamel factory buildings

- Location within Massachusetts Location within the United States
- Location: Haverhill, Massachusetts
- Coordinates: 42°46′34″N 71°5′9″W
- Built: 1886-1929
- Architect: Haverhill Building Trust Concrete Engineering Co. Damon Brothers
- Architectural style: Classical Revival Modern
- Restored: 1984
- Restored by: Finegold Alexander & Associates, Inc.
- NRHP reference No.: 09000032
- Added to NRHP: February 18, 2009

The L. H. Hamel Leather Company Historic District encompasses the largest tract of intact historical industrial buildings in downtown Haverhill, Massachusetts. The monumental factory complex of the L. H. Hamel Leather Company is located just west of Haverhill's central business district, and is roughly bordered on the west by the right-of-way for the former Boston & Maine Railroad, Essex Street on the south, Locke Street and Duncan Street on the east, and Winter Street on the north. The complex, which was built up between 1886 and 1929, was listed on the National Register of Historic Places in 2009.

The oldest building is a brick warehouse whose central portion was built c. 1886, followed by extensions in c. 1910 and c. 1950. It was at first used by wholesale grocery suppliers before becoming associated with the leatherworks of the early 20th century, and is a reminder of smaller-scale 19th century industrial activity in the area. Between 1911 and 1916 a complex of three eight story concrete buildings was constructed on Essex Street by the Haverhill Building Trust, an consortium of local business leaders. These buildings added 30 acres (12 ha) of manufacturing floor space, and more than $1 million to the city's tax rolls. The premises were leased to companies involved in the manufacture of shoes, the city's dominant industry.

The Hamel Company did not immediately figure in these buildings' history. Louis Hamel opened his business in the 1910s as a young man, in premises on Washington Street. His business grew rapidly, and in 1923 he moved a tanning operation into 20,000 square feet (1,900 m^{2}) the Tilton Building at 115–117 Essex Street, and eventually took over the entire building. A one-story brick addition was added to the building for the Hamel Company in 1928–29. Hamel was an early tenant, however, in the Essex Associates Building at 109–113 Essex Street, a brick eight-story structure built 1914–15 to a design by Damon Brothers architects, and providing a distinctive offset to the adjacent lighter-colored concrete buildings. Hamel used these buildings to produce shoe manufacturing equipment, developing innovations he licensed to other manufacturers.

By 1940 Hamel occupied space in all four buildings, as well as the Shoe and Leather Associates Building at 98–112 Essex Street. In 1941 Hamel purchased the Pentucket Associates Building, 10 Duncan Street, and expanded operations for leather coats into some of that space, leasing the rest out. Over the rest of the decade the company acquired most of the remaining buildings in the district.

After the company began closing down operations at the complex in 1973, some buildings were demolished, while others have been rehabilitated and repurposed. The Lang and Burgess Buildings (151 and 143–45 Essex) were converted to offices, while the Tilton, Essex Associates, Pentucket Associates, and other buildings were converted to residences.

== See also ==
- National Register of Historic Places listings in Essex County, Massachusetts
