= Gott House =

Historic house in Massachusetts, United States

- U.S. National Register of Historic Places
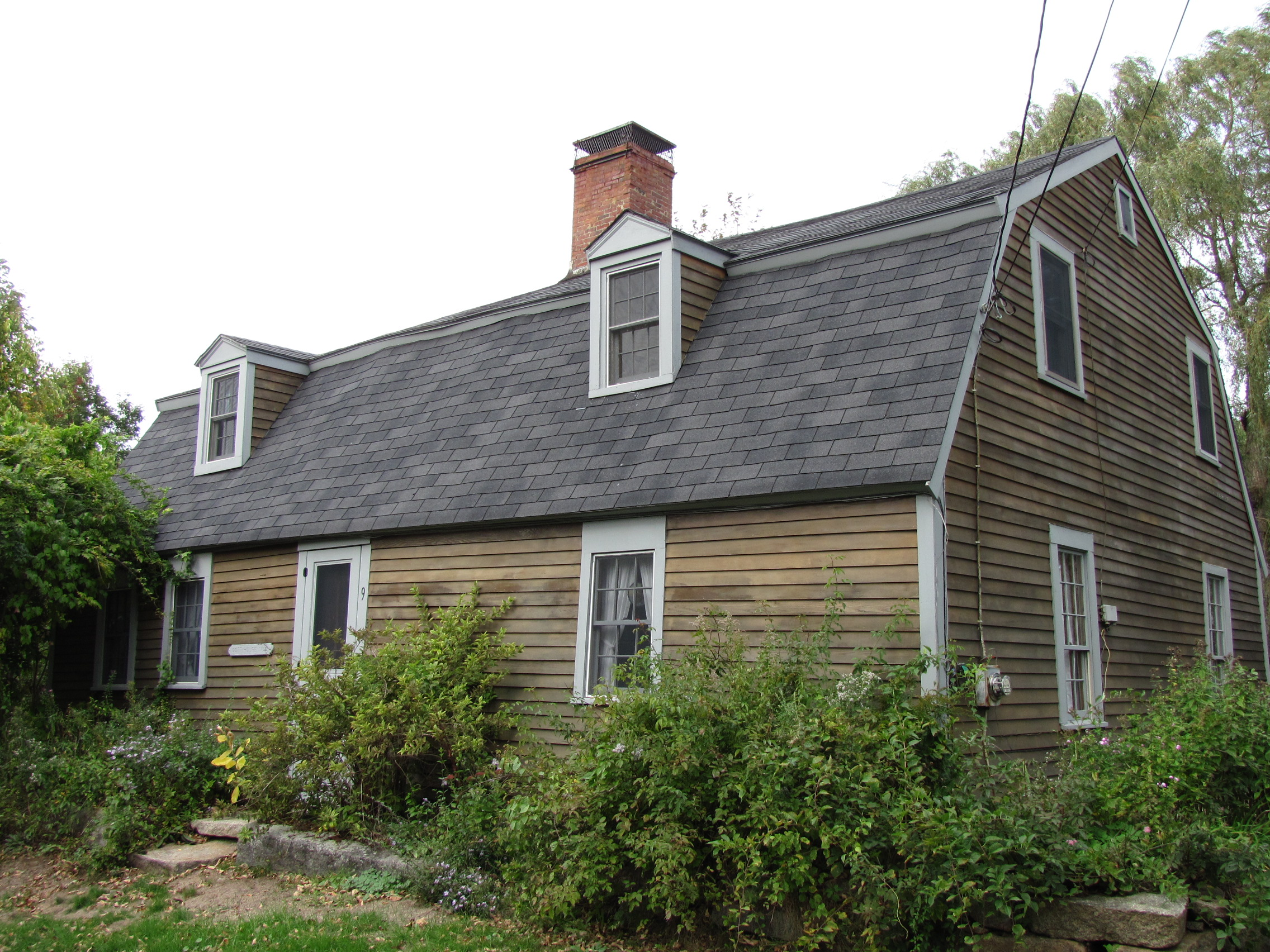
- Gott House

- Location within Massachusetts Location within the United States
- Location: Rockport, Massachusetts
- Coordinates: 42°41′14″N 70°37′53″W
- Architectural style: Colonial
- MPS: First Period Buildings of Eastern Massachusetts TR
- NRHP reference No.: 90000255
- Added to NRHP: March 9, 1990

The Gott House is a historic late First Period house in Rockport, Massachusetts. The plank-framed gambrel-roofed cottage was built in 1702, exhibiting the transitional nature of the construction techniques used, and the gambrel roof, which is not a normal First Period feature. It also features 2 dormers that were added some time later. The first part built was the right side and the central chimney; this was extended with the rooms left of the chimney later in the Second Period. The interior retains significant Second Period trim and decoration. The house has never been sold, and has been handed down through the generations to its current occupants.

The house was listed on the National Register of Historic Places in 1990.

== See also ==
- National Register of Historic Places listings in Essex County, Massachusetts
- American historic carpentry
