= Towne Farm =

Historic house in Massachusetts, United States

- U.S. National Register of Historic Places
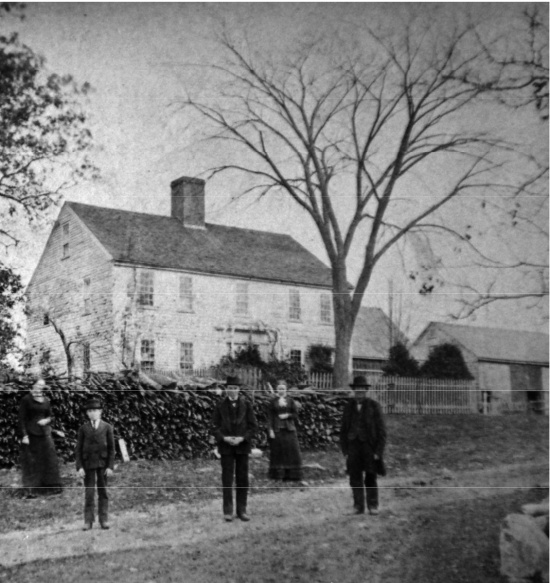
- A 19th century image of the farmhouse

- Location within Massachusetts Location within the United States
- Location: 55 Towne Road, Boxford, Massachusetts
- Coordinates: 42°39′28″N 71°1′35″W
- Built: 1790
- Architectural style: Colonial
- NRHP reference No.: 12000455
- Added to NRHP: August 1, 2012

Towne Farm is a historic farm complex in Boxford, Massachusetts. It is the most complete remaining farm complex in the town, and is also notable for its long association with the locally prominent Towne family, which owned the surviving farmland and surrounding land from 1777 until the 1930s. The 16.9-acre (6.8 ha) was listed on the National Register of Historic Places in 2012.

John Towne first came to Boxford, then a rural agricultural town, in 1777, buying half of a parcel of land belonging to his brother-in-law. He lived in the c. 1756 house on the property until 1790, when his son built the current farmhouse; the old house was demolished. Towne died in 1830, at which time his property passed to his son Samuel. Samuel sold the farmstead and 75 acres (30 ha) to his son Henry in 1845. These three generations of Townes appear to have been subsistence farmers, although Henry appears to have supplemented his income by engaging in the manufacture of shoes.

Henry Towne sold the property (now 95 acres (38 ha)) to his son Hiram, who was principally in the lumbering business, but continued to maintain the farm. It is during his ownership that a number of the surviving outbuildings were built: a windmill and water tower were built in the first decade of the 20th century, but a henhouse, cottage, and camp house have not survived. He also made some modifications to the farmhouse, adding bay windows and a single story porch to its front.

Hiram Towne died childless in 1932, and the farm was transferred out of the family two years later. Much of the Towne's land was given to the state, and forms part of Boxford State Forest. The farm portion went through a succession of owners in the 20th century, during which time additional neighboring parcels were sometimes added to the property. One large tract (89 acres (36 ha)) was sold in 2001 to a conservation organization, and others have been subdivided for residential development. In 2009 the farm complex and about 17 acres (6.9 ha) of land were acquired by i-Farm LLC, which has been working to restore the farm to working order.

== See also ==
- National Register of Historic Places listings in Essex County, Massachusetts
