= National Register of Historic Places listings in Essex County, Massachusetts =

Location of Essex County in Massachusetts

This list is of that portion of the National Register of Historic Places (NRHP) designated in Essex County, Massachusetts. The locations of these properties and districts for which the latitude and longitude coordinates are included below, may be seen in a map.

There are more than 450 designated properties in the county, including 26 that are further designated as National Historic Landmarks. The municipalities of Andover, Gloucester, Ipswich, Lawrence, Lynn, Methuen, and Salem are to be found on a separate list(s) of the more than 200 identified here, except two properties are split between Methuen and Lawrence, and one between Lynn and Nahant; these entries appear on more than one list.

Contents: Counties in Massachusetts

Barnstable | Berkshire | Bristol | Dukes | Essex | Franklin | Hampden | Hampshire | Middlesex | Nantucket | Norfolk | Plymouth | Suffolk | Worcester

This National Park Service list is complete through NPS recent listings posted August 28, 2026.

== Cities and towns listed separately ==
Due to the number of listings in the county, some cities and towns have their sites listed separately.

Community	Image	First Date listed	Last Date listed	Count
Andover		February 24, 1975	March 9, 1990	51
Gloucester		July 1, 1970	December 20, 2016	34
Ipswich		October 15, 1966	August 22, 1996	31
Lawrence		November 9, 1972	March 12, 2012	24
Lynn		November 28, 1978	July 24, 2026	31
Methuen		December 1, 1978	January 3, 1985	45
Salem		October 15, 1966	July 27, 2015	46

== Current listings in other cities and towns ==
	Name on the Register	Image	Date listed	Location	City or town	Description
1	Abbot Hall	Abbot Hall	September 6, 1974 (#74000374)	Washington Sq. 42°30′09″N 70°51′10″W	Marblehead	
2	Abraham Adams House	Abraham Adams House	March 9, 1990 (#90000245)	8 Pearson Dr. 42°45′17″N 70°55′43″W	Newbury	
3	Adams-Clarke House	Adams-Clarke House	March 9, 1990 (#90000211)	93 W. Main St. 42°43′42″N 70°59′43″W	Georgetown	
4	Agawam Diner	Agawam Diner	September 22, 1999 (#99001124)	166 Newburyport Turnpike; 42°42′17″N 70°54′37″W	Rowley	
5	Amesbury and Salisbury Mills Village Historic District	Amesbury and Salisbury Mills Village Historic District	May 16, 1985 (#85001121)	Market Sq. roughly bounded by Boardman, Water, Main and Pond Sts. 42°51′28″N 70°55′52″W	Amesbury	
6	Amesbury Friends Meeting House	Amesbury Friends Meeting House	April 18, 2002 (#02000376)	120 Friend St. 42°51′18″N 70°56′19″W	Amesbury	
7	Amesbury Public Library		December 9, 2025 (#100012354)	149 Main Street; 42°51′19″N 70°55′57″W	Amesbury	
8	Ann's Diner	Ann's Diner	December 10, 2003 (#03001264)	11 Bridge Rd. (U.S. Route 1); 42°50′24″N 70°51′40″W	Salisbury	
9	Asbury Grove Historic District	Asbury Grove Historic District	November 18, 2009 (#09000935)	Around Asbury St. 42°37′35″N 70°53′09″W	Hamilton	
10	John Balch House	John Balch House	February 23, 1973 (#73000275)	448 Cabot St. 42°33′44″N 70°53′05″W	Beverly	
11	Parson Barnard House	Parson Barnard House	September 6, 1974 (#74000918)	179 Osgood St. 42°41′23″N 71°07′02″W	North Andover	Once thought to belong to Simon and Anne Bradstreet
12	Beverly Center Business District	Beverly Center Business District	July 5, 1984 (#84002313)	Roughly bounded by Chapman, Central, Brown, Dane, and Essex Sts. 42°32′54″N 70°52′41″W	Beverly	
13	Beverly Depot	Beverly Depot	October 14, 1979 (#09000087)	Park Street; 42°32′51″N 70°53′07″W	Beverly	
14	Beverly Depot-Odell Park Historic District	Beverly Depot-Odell Park Historic District	January 8, 2014 (#13001056)	Roughly bounded by River, Rantoul & Pleasant Sts., Broadway; 42°32′50″N 70°53′05″W	Beverly	
15	Beverly Grammar School	Beverly Grammar School	March 9, 1990 (#90000198)	50 Essex St. 42°33′06″N 70°52′34″W	Beverly	
16	Beverly High School		January 7, 2026 (#100012636)	20 Colon Street; 42°33′33″N 70°52′44″W	Beverly	Not the current high school; now an arts center
17	Beverly Powder House	Beverly Powder House	August 15, 2019 (#100004267)	Rear Madison Ave. 42°33′12″N 70°52′31″W	Beverly	
18	Boardman House	Boardman House	October 15, 1966 (#66000131)	Howard St. 42°28′20″N 71°02′17″W	Saugus	
19	John Boardman House	John Boardman House	March 9, 1990 (#90000361)	28 Lawrence Rd. 42°39′56″N 71°01′28″W	Boxford	
20	Boxford Village Historic District	Boxford Village Historic District	April 11, 1973 (#73000279)	Middleton and Topsfield Rds. and Main and Elm Sts. 42°39′43″N 70°59′58″W	Boxford	
21	Bradford Burial Ground	Bradford Burial Ground	June 15, 2015 (#15000351)	326 Salem St. 42°45′34″N 71°03′49″W	Haverhill	
22	Bradford Common Historic District	Bradford Common Historic District	September 14, 1977 (#77000179)	S. Main St. 42°45′59″N 71°04′45″W	Haverhill	
23	Breakheart Reservation Parkways-Metropolitan Park System of Greater Boston	Breakheart Reservation Parkways-Metropolitan Park System of Greater Boston	August 11, 2003 (#03000748)	Forest St., Pine Tops, Elm and Hemlock Rds. 42°29′15″N 71°02′05″W	Saugus	Extends into Wakefield in Middlesex County.
24	Briggs Carriage Company	Briggs Carriage Company	April 3, 2017 (#100000822)	14 & 20 Cedar St. 42°51′41″N 70°55′40″W	Amesbury	
25	Brown House	Brown House	March 9, 1990 (#90000223)	76 Bridge St. 42°36′58″N 70°51′06″W	Hamilton	
26	Brown Square House	Brown Square House	March 7, 1975 (#75000284)	11 Brown Sq. 42°48′40″N 70°52′27″W	Newburyport	
27	Austin Brown House	Austin Brown House	March 9, 1990 (#90000222)	1028 Bay Rd. 42°38′26″N 70°50′55″W	Hamilton	
28	David Burnham House	David Burnham House	July 30, 1983 (#83000574)	Pond St. 42°36′57″N 70°48′07″W	Essex	
29	Capt. John Cabot House	Capt. John Cabot House	April 16, 1975 (#75000246)	117 Cabot St. 42°32′45″N 70°52′49″W	Beverly	
30	Parson Capen House	Parson Capen House	October 15, 1966 (#66000139)	Howlett St. 42°38′36″N 70°57′00″W	Topsfield	
31	Carlton-Frie-Tucker House	Carlton-Frie-Tucker House	March 9, 1990 (#90000251)	140 Mill Rd. 42°39′28″N 71°06′00″W	North Andover	
32	Chaplin-Clarke House	Chaplin-Clarke House	May 10, 1979 (#79000343)	109 Haverhill St. 42°42′33″N 70°53′32″W	Rowley	
33	Samuel Chase House	Samuel Chase House	March 9, 1990 (#90000273)	154 Main St. 42°47′17″N 71°00′06″W	West Newbury	
34	Claflin-Richards House	Claflin-Richards House	April 3, 1973 (#73000853)	132 Main St. 42°36′14″N 70°53′16″W	Wenham	
35	Cogswell's Grant	Cogswell's Grant	April 19, 1990 (#90000666)	60 Spring St. 42°38′18″N 70°46′22″W	Essex	
36	Benjamin Coker House	Benjamin Coker House	March 9, 1990 (#90000247)	172 State St. 42°48′05″N 70°52′31″W	Newburyport	
37	Community House	Community House	May 11, 2011 (#11000265)	284 Bay Rd. 42°36′47″N 70°52′21″W	Hamilton	
38	Exercise Conant House	Exercise Conant House	March 9, 1990 (#90000199)	634 Cabot St. 42°34′33″N 70°53′47″W	Beverly	
39	Samuel Corning House	Samuel Corning House	March 9, 1990 (#90000196)	87 Hull St. 42°34′49″N 70°50′23″W	Beverly	
40	Caleb Cushing House	Caleb Cushing House	November 7, 1973 (#73000327)	98 High St. 42°48′24″N 70°52′16″W	Newburyport	
41	Dalton House	Dalton House	March 29, 1978 (#78000464)	95 State St. 42°48′29″N 70°52′18″W	Newburyport	
42	Ephraim Davis House	Ephraim Davis House	March 9, 1990 (#90000228)	Merrimack Rd., north of its junction with Amesbury Line Rd. 42°48′45″N 71°00′33″W	Haverhill	
43	Derby Summerhouse	Derby Summerhouse	November 24, 1968 (#68000020)	Magna Estate, Ingersoll St. 42°34′22″N 70°58′00″W	Danvers	
44	Dickinson-Pillsbury-Witham House	Dickinson-Pillsbury-Witham House	March 9, 1990 (#90000210)	170 Jewett St. 42°43′44″N 70°56′42″W	Georgetown	
45	Dodge Building	Dodge Building	August 26, 1982 (#82001878)	19-23 Pleasant St. 42°48′36″N 70°52′50″W	Newburyport	
46	Dustin House	Dustin House	March 9, 1990 (#90000227)	665 Hilldale Ave. 42°47′47″N 71°06′41″W	Haverhill	
47	East Parish Meeting House	East Parish Meeting House	March 29, 2011 (#11000149)	150 Middle Rd. 42°48′01″N 71°02′01″W	Haverhill	
48	Emerson House	Emerson House	March 9, 1990 (#90000229)	5-9 Pentucket St. 42°46′44″N 71°04′47″W	Haverhill	
49	Essex Town Hall and TOHP Burnham Library	Essex Town Hall and TOHP Burnham Library	September 12, 2007 (#07000946)	30 Martin St. 42°37′54″N 70°47′00″W	Essex	
50	Estey Tavern	Estey Tavern	October 12, 1989 (#89001587)	Central and Maple Sts. at MA 114; 42°35′43″N 71°00′57″W	Middleton	
51	Nathaniel Felton Houses	Nathaniel Felton Houses	April 1, 1982 (#82001882)	43 Felton St. (Jr.) and 47 Felton St. (Sr.); 42°32′44″N 70°57′40″W	Peabody	
52	First Religious Society Church and Parish Hall	First Religious Society Church and Parish Hall	April 2, 1976 (#76000278)	26 Pleasant St. 42°48′39″N 70°52′18″W	Newburyport	
53	First Unitarian Church	First Unitarian Church	September 18, 1989 (#88001091)	7 Park St. 42°31′28″N 70°55′38″W	Peabody	
54	Fish Flake Hill Historic District	Fish Flake Hill Historic District	October 26, 1971 (#71000082)	Northern and southern sides of Front St. from Cabot to Bartlett Sts. 42°32′29″N 70°53′02″W	Beverly	
55	Flint Public Library	Flint Public Library	June 14, 2002 (#02000631)	2 N. Main St. 42°35′41″N 71°01′01″W	Middleton	
56	Fort Sewall	Fort Sewall	April 14, 1975 (#75001908)	Fort Sewall Promontory; 42°30′32″N 70°50′30″W	Marblehead	
57	Gen. Gideon Foster House	Gen. Gideon Foster House	June 23, 1976 (#76000287)	35 Washington St. 42°31′22″N 70°55′30″W	Peabody	
58	Phineas Foster House	Phineas Foster House	March 9, 1990 (#90000193)	11 Old Topsfield Rd. 42°38′56″N 70°58′50″W	Boxford	Listed on the Register at 15 Old Topsfield Rd.
59	Stephen Foster House	Stephen Foster House	March 9, 1990 (#90000262)	109 North St. 42°39′35″N 70°56′02″W	Topsfield	
60	Fowler House	Fowler House	September 17, 1974 (#74000367)	166 High St. 42°33′22″N 70°55′29″W	Danvers	
61	Rea Putnam Fowler House	Rea Putnam Fowler House	March 9, 1990 (#90000202)	4 Elerton Pl. 42°34′37″N 70°56′09″W	Danvers	
62	Fox Hill School	Fox Hill School	February 10, 1988 (#87002554)	81 Water St. 42°33′01″N 70°55′24″W	Danvers	
63	French-Andrews House	French-Andrews House	March 9, 1990 (#90000263)	86 Howlett Rd. 42°38′33″N 70°56′18″W	Topsfield	
64	James Friend House	James Friend House	March 9, 1990 (#90000268)	114 Cedar St. 42°35′46″N 70°54′23″W	Wenham	
65	Samuel Frye House	Samuel Frye House	March 9, 1990 (#90000252)	920 Turnpike St. 42°39′25″N 71°06′14″W	North Andover	
66	Joseph Fuller House	Joseph Fuller House	March 9, 1990 (#90000244)	161 Essex St. 42°37′03″N 71°02′11″W	Middleton	
67	Lieut. Thomas Fuller House	Lieut. Thomas Fuller House	March 9, 1990 (#90000242)	Old S. Main St. between Mt. Vernon and Boston Sts. 42°35′32″N 71°00′49″W	Middleton	
68	Georgetown Central School	Georgetown Central School	August 30, 2001 (#01000915)	1 Library St. 42°43′21″N 70°59′38″W	Georgetown	Currently serves as Georgetown's Town Hall.
69	Elbridge Gerry House	Elbridge Gerry House	July 2, 1973 (#73000304)	44 Washington St. 42°30′24″N 70°50′52″W	Marblehead	
70	George Giddings House and Barn	George Giddings House and Barn	March 9, 1990 (#90000206)	66 Choate St. 42°38′47″N 70°48′24″W	Essex	
71	Gen. John Glover House	Gen. John Glover House	November 28, 1972 (#72001101)	11 Glover St. 42°30′19″N 70°50′51″W	Marblehead	
72	Gott House	Gott House	March 9, 1990 (#90000255)	Gott Ave. at Gott Ln. 42°41′14″N 70°37′53″W	Rockport	
73	Capt. Joseph Gould House	Capt. Joseph Gould House	March 9, 1990 (#90000259)	129 Washington St. 42°38′30″N 70°58′02″W	Topsfield	
74	Zaccheus Gould House	Zaccheus Gould House	March 9, 1990 (#90000261)	85 River Road; 42°38′00″N 70°57′38″W	Topsfield	Listed on the register at 73 Prospect Street; property has been subdivided
75	Granite Keystone Bridge	Granite Keystone Bridge	August 27, 1981 (#81000117)	Granite St. 42°40′01″N 70°37′33″W	Rockport	
76	Greenlawn Cemetery	Greenlawn Cemetery	May 11, 2000 (#00000481)	195 Nahant Rd. 42°25′37″N 70°55′41″W	Nahant	
77	Reverend John Hale House	Reverend John Hale House	October 9, 1974 (#74000364)	39 Hale St. 42°32′56″N 70°52′30″W	Beverly	
78	Hale-Boynton House	Hale-Boynton House	April 14, 1983 (#83000578)	Middle St. 42°45′05″N 70°54′03″W	Newbury	
79	Hamilton Historic District	Hamilton Historic District	April 13, 1973 (#73000300)	540-700 and 563-641 Bay Rd. 42°37′21″N 70°51′14″W	Hamilton	
80	Joseph Hardy House	Joseph Hardy House	March 9, 1990 (#90000219)	69 King St. 42°45′30″N 71°01′23″W	Groveland	Listed at 93 King Street.
81	Harris Farm	Harris Farm	March 9, 1990 (#90000241)	3 Manataug Trail; 42°30′27″N 70°52′09″W	Marblehead	
82	Hart House	Hart House	March 9, 1990 (#90000239)	172 Chestnut St. 42°32′26″N 71°03′46″W	Lynnfield	
83	Captain Robert Haskell House	Captain Robert Haskell House	July 25, 2022 (#100006593)	680 Hale St. 42°33′42″N 70°49′02″W	Beverly	
84	Hastings-Morse House	Hastings-Morse House	March 14, 1991 (#90000225)	595 E. Broadway; 42°47′51″N 71°01′04″W	Haverhill	
85	Haverhill Board of Trade Building	Haverhill Board of Trade Building	September 28, 2007 (#07001008)	16-18 and 38-42 Walnut St. 42°46′32″N 71°05′22″W	Haverhill	
86	Haverhill Historical Society Historic District	Haverhill Historical Society Historic District	June 8, 2005 (#05000560)	240 Water St. 42°46′21″N 71°04′03″W	Haverhill	
87	Haverhill Powder House		October 28, 2024 (#100010944)	91 Powder House Avenue; 42°46′21″N 71°03′21″W	Haverhill	
88	Charles H. Hayes Building	Charles H. Hayes Building	December 13, 2010 (#10001006)	14-44 Granite St. 42°46′27″N 71°05′07″W	Haverhill	
89	Hazen-Kimball-Aldrich House	Hazen-Kimball-Aldrich House	March 9, 1990 (#90000209)	225 E. Main St. 42°42′59″N 70°58′32″W	Georgetown	
90	Hazen-Spiller House	Hazen-Spiller House	March 9, 1990 (#90000226)	8 Groveland St. 42°46′13″N 71°03′49″W	Haverhill	
91	Henfield House	Henfield House	March 4, 1991 (#90000240)	300 Main St. 42°32′06″N 71°03′34″W	Lynnfield	
92	Hickey-Osborne Block	Hickey-Osborne Block	September 19, 1985 (#85002416)	38-60 Main St. 42°31′32″N 70°55′33″W	Peabody	
93	High Street Cemetery	High Street Cemetery	May 9, 2003 (#03000382)	45 High St. 42°33′50″N 70°56′04″W	Danvers	
94	Oliver Wendell Holmes House	Oliver Wendell Holmes House	November 28, 1972 (#72001301)	868 Hale St. 42°33′52″N 70°48′23″W	Beverly	
95	Holyoke-French House	Holyoke-French House	April 26, 1972 (#72000123)	Elm St. and Topsfield Rd. 42°39′41″N 70°59′50″W	Boxford	
96	Robert "King" Hooper Mansion	Robert "King" Hooper Mansion	May 12, 1976 (#76000264)	8 Hooper St. 42°28′34″N 70°51′01″W	Marblehead	
97	George Hopkinson House	George Hopkinson House	March 9, 1990 (#90000220)	362 Main St. 42°45′39″N 71°02′06″W	Groveland	
98	Hose House No. 2	Hose House No. 2	July 3, 1986 (#86001461)	30 Rantoul St. 42°32′35″N 70°53′09″W	Beverly	
99	Hospital Point Light Station	Hospital Point Light Station	September 28, 1987 (#87002031)	Bayview Ave. 42°32′40″N 70°51′30″W	Beverly	
100	House at 922 Dale Street	House at 922 Dale Street	March 9, 1990 (#90000248)	922 Dale St. 42°41′40″N 71°04′07″W	North Andover	
101	Howe Village Historic District	Howe Village Historic District	April 3, 1973 (#73000282)	Northeast of Boxford on MA 97; 42°40′32″N 70°58′08″W	Boxford	
102	Sir John Humphreys House	Sir John Humphreys House	March 9, 1990 (#90000258)	99 Paradise Rd. 42°28′21″N 70°55′06″W	Swampscott	
103	Intervale Factory	Intervale Factory	June 30, 1988 (#88000958)	402 River St. 42°45′56″N 71°05′52″W	Haverhill	
104	Capt. Timothy Johnson House	Capt. Timothy Johnson House	March 9, 1990 (#90000249)	18-20 Stevens St. 42°41′55″N 71°06′41″W	North Andover	
105	Solomon Kimball House	Solomon Kimball House	March 9, 1990 (#90000264)	26 Maple St. 42°36′03″N 70°55′13″W	Wenham	
106	Kittredge Mansion	Kittredge Mansion	December 12, 1976 (#76000282)	56 Academy Rd. 42°41′26″N 71°06′51″W	North Andover	
107	George Kunhardt Estate	George Kunhardt Estate	April 22, 1976 (#76000284)	29-49 Cochichewick Drive; 42°42′39″N 71°05′44″W	North Andover	Listed on the register at 1518 Great Pond Road; since subdivided and converted to condominiums.
108	Stanley Lake House	Stanley Lake House	March 9, 1990 (#90000260)	95 River Rd. 42°38′02″N 70°57′47″W	Topsfield	
109	Thomas Lambert House	Thomas Lambert House	March 9, 1990 (#90000256)	142 Main St. 42°42′54″N 70°52′51″W	Rowley	
110	Larch Farm	Larch Farm	March 9, 1990 (#90000266)	38 Larch Rd. 42°36′08″N 70°52′45″W	Wenham	
111	Jeremiah Lee House	Jeremiah Lee House	October 15, 1966 (#66000766)	Washington St. 42°30′12″N 70°51′06″W	Marblehead	
112	L.H. Hamel Leather Company Historic District	L.H. Hamel Leather Company Historic District	February 18, 2009 (#09000032)	Bounded by Essex, Locke, Duncan, and Winter Sts., and the former Boston and Maine railroad tracks 42°46′34″N 71°05′09″W	Haverhill	
113	William Livermore House	William Livermore House	March 9, 1990 (#90000197)	271 Essex St. 42°34′00″N 70°51′41″W	Beverly	
114	Henry Cabot Lodge House	Henry Cabot Lodge House	December 8, 1976 (#76001971)	5 Cliff St. 42°25′18″N 70°54′39″W	Nahant	
115	Lowell's Boat Shop	Lowell's Boat Shop	June 9, 1988 (#88000706)	459 Main St. 42°50′32″N 70°54′52″W	Amesbury	
116	David S. Lynch Memorial Park	David S. Lynch Memorial Park	November 13, 2024 (#100011047)	55 Ober Street; 42°32′47″N 70°51′39″W	Beverly	
117	Lynn Fells Parkway, Metropolitan Park System of Greater Boston	Lynn Fells Parkway, Metropolitan Park System of Greater Boston	May 9, 2003 (#03000380)	Lynn Fells Parkway; 42°28′05″N 71°02′58″W	Saugus	Extends into Melrose, Middlesex County
118	Machine Shop Village District	Machine Shop Village District	October 14, 1982 (#82000482)	Roughly bounded by Main, Pleasant, Clarendon, Water, 2nd Sts., and B&M railroad line 42°41′59″N 71°07′37″W	North Andover	
119	Macy-Colby House	Macy-Colby House	June 16, 2008 (#08000531)	257 Main St. 42°50′45″N 70°55′46″W	Amesbury	
120	Main Street Historic District	Main Street Historic District	May 9, 2003 (#03000383)	Main, Summer Sts. 42°46′42″N 71°04′42″W	Haverhill	
121	Manchester Village Historic District	Manchester Village Historic District	January 8, 1990 (#89002156)	Roughly Friend, School, North, Washington, Sea, Union, Central, Bennett, Bridge Sts., and Ashland Ave. 42°34′28″N 70°46′21″W	Manchester	
122	Marblehead Historic District	Marblehead Historic District	January 10, 1984 (#84002402)	Roughly bounded by Marblehead Harbor, Waldron Court, Essex, Elm, Pond, and Norman Sts. 42°30′15″N 70°50′58″W	Marblehead	
123	Marblehead Light	Marblehead Light	June 15, 1987 (#87001479)	Marblehead Neck; 42°30′03″N 70°49′54″W	Marblehead	
124	Samuel March House	Samuel March House	March 9, 1990 (#90000272)	444 Main St. 42°48′11″N 70°59′07″W	West Newbury	
125	Market Square Historic District	Market Square Historic District	February 25, 1971 (#71000088)	Market Sq. and properties fronting on State, Merrimac, Liberty, and Water Sts. 42°48′40″N 70°52′13″W	Newburyport	
126	Meetinghouse Common District	Meetinghouse Common District	November 21, 1976 (#76000260)	Summer, S. Common, and Main Sts. 42°32′21″N 71°03′01″W	Lynnfield	
127	Merrimack Associates Building	Merrimack Associates Building	June 17, 2009 (#09000436)	25 Locust St. 42°46′33″N 71°05′03″W	Haverhill	
128	Moore-Hill House	Moore-Hill House	June 9, 1988 (#88000704)	82 Franklin St. 42°31′41″N 70°56′07″W	Peabody	
129	Timothy Morse House	Timothy Morse House	March 9, 1990 (#90000271)	628 Main St. 42°48′25″N 70°58′06″W	West Newbury	
130	Nahant Beach Boulevard-Metropolitan Park System of Greater Boston	Nahant Beach Boulevard-Metropolitan Park System of Greater Boston	August 11, 2003 (#03000747)	Nahant Beach Boulevard; 42°26′12″N 70°56′17″W	Nahant	Extends briefly into Lynn.
131	Nahant Civic Historic District	Nahant Civic Historic District	September 3, 1991 (#91001174)	332 and 334 Nahant Rd. and 15 Pleasant St. 42°25′27″N 70°54′51″W	Nahant	
132	Nahant Life-Saving Station	Nahant Life-Saving Station	March 20, 2012 (#12000133)	96 Nahant Rd. 42°25′51″N 70°56′01″W	Nahant	
133	The New Hampshire	The New Hampshire	October 29, 1976 (#76000261)	Southeast of Manchester off Graves Island; 42°34′14″N 70°44′44″W	Manchester	Wreck of the USS New Hampshire
134	Newbury Historic District	Newbury Historic District	May 24, 1976 (#76000275)	Irregular pattern along High Rd., Green and Hanover Sts. 42°47′51″N 70°51′44″W	Newbury	
135	Newburyport Harbor Front Range Light	Newburyport Harbor Front Range Light	June 15, 1987 (#87001486)	Merrimack River Coast Guard Station; 42°47′54″N 70°48′35″W	Newburyport	
136	Newburyport Harbor Light	Newburyport Harbor Light	June 15, 1987 (#87001485)	Northern Boulevard; 42°48′55″N 70°49′08″W	Newburyport	
137	Newburyport Harbor Rear Range Light	Newburyport Harbor Rear Range Light	June 15, 1987 (#87000887)	61½ Water St. 42°47′38″N 70°48′26″W	Newburyport	
138	Newburyport Historic District	Newburyport Historic District	August 2, 1984 (#84002411)	Roughly bounded by the Merrimack River, Plummer Ave., Marlboro, Plummer, State, and High Sts. 42°48′41″N 70°52′40″W	Newburyport	
139	Newell Farm	Newell Farm	July 21, 1978 (#78001406)	243 Main St. 42°47′33″N 70°59′50″W	West Newbury	
140	Newman-Fiske-Dodge House	Newman-Fiske-Dodge House	March 9, 1990 (#90000267)	162 Cherry St. 42°36′13″N 70°54′54″W	Wenham	
141	North Andover Center Historic District	North Andover Center Historic District	March 5, 1979 (#79000336)	Roughly bounded by Osgood, Pleasant, Stevens, Johnson, and Andover Sts. and Wood Lane; 42°41′15″N 71°06′55″W	North Andover	
142	James Noyes House	James Noyes House	March 9, 1990 (#90000246)	7 Parker St. 42°47′51″N 70°51′46″W	Newbury	
143	Odd Fellows' Hall	Odd Fellows' Hall	November 20, 1978 (#78001408)	188-194 Cabot St. 42°32′52″N 70°52′48″W	Beverly	
144	Old Castle	Old Castle	September 1, 1978 (#78000466)	North of Rockport on MA 127; 42°40′35″N 70°37′31″W	Rockport	
145	Old Farm	Old Farm	March 9, 1990 (#90000265)	9 Maple St. 42°35′55″N 70°55′03″W	Wenham	
146	Old Garrison House	Old Garrison House	March 4, 1991 (#90000254)	188 Granite St. 42°40′51″N 70°37′41″W	Rockport	
147	Old Town House	Old Town House	August 13, 1976 (#76000265)	Town House Sq. 42°30′19″N 70°51′01″W	Marblehead	
148	Olmsted Subdivision Historic District	Olmsted Subdivision Historic District	July 1, 2002 (#02000696)	Roughly bounded by New Ocean Paradise Rd., Swampscott Ave., Redington Rd. and Burrill St. 42°28′18″N 70°54′56″W	Swampscott	
149	Prince Osborne House	Prince Osborne House	March 9, 1990 (#90000203)	273 Maple St. 42°34′25″N 70°57′15″W	Danvers	
150	Osgood Hill	Osgood Hill	February 5, 1999 (#99000135)	709 and 723 Osgood St. 42°42′35″N 71°06′45″W	North Andover	Locally known as the Stevens Estate
151	Col. John Osgood House	Col. John Osgood House	March 9, 1990 (#90000250)	547 Osgood St. 42°42′03″N 71°06′42″W	North Andover	
152	Samuel Osgood House	Samuel Osgood House	December 30, 1974 (#74000380)	440 Osgood St. 42°41′50″N 71°06′53″W	North Andover	
153	O'Shea Building	O'Shea Building	January 11, 1980 (#09000710)	1-15 Main St. 42°31′32″N 70°55′36″W	Peabody	
154	Palmer School	Palmer School	February 20, 1998 (#98000122)	33 Main St. 42°39′32″N 71°00′10″W	Boxford	
155	Emeline Patch House	Emeline Patch House	March 9, 1990 (#90000221)	918 Bay Rd. 42°38′42″N 70°50′42″W	Hamilton	
156	Peabody Central Fire Station	Peabody Central Fire Station	April 11, 1979 (#79000344)	41 Lowell St. 42°31′38″N 70°55′52″W	Peabody	
157	Peabody City Hall	Peabody City Hall	July 27, 1972 (#72000142)	24 Lowell St. 42°31′35″N 70°55′44″W	Peabody	
158	Peabody Civic Center Historic District	Peabody Civic Center Historic District	November 25, 1980 (#80000477)	Chestnut, Church, Foster, Franklin, and Lowell Sts. 42°31′32″N 70°55′48″W	Peabody	
159	Peabody Institute	Peabody Institute	December 22, 1997 (#97001559)	15 Sylvan St. 42°33′41″N 70°56′30″W	Danvers	
160	Peabody Institute Library	Peabody Institute Library	June 4, 1973 (#73000311)	Main St. 42°31′29″N 70°55′28″W	Peabody	
161	Peabody School	Peabody School	October 23, 1986 (#86002900)	170 Salem St. 42°45′48″N 71°04′15″W	Haverhill	
162	George Peabody House	George Peabody House	July 6, 1988 (#88000911)	205 Washington St. 42°31′16″N 70°56′10″W	Peabody	
163	John Perkins House	John Perkins House	March 9, 1990 (#90000269)	75 Arbor St. 42°36′49″N 70°53′19″W	Wenham	Probably demolished.
164	Platts-Bradstreet House	Platts-Bradstreet House	September 27, 1980 (#80000645)	Main St. 42°43′07″N 70°52′31″W	Rowley	
165	Primrose Street Schoolhouse	Primrose Street Schoolhouse	June 23, 1983 (#83000582)	71 Primrose St. 42°46′45″N 71°05′06″W	Haverhill	
166	John Proctor House	John Proctor House	March 9, 1990 (#90000253)	348 Lowell St. 42°32′01″N 70°57′16″W	Peabody	
167	Deacon Edward Putnam Jr. House	Deacon Edward Putnam Jr. House	March 9, 1990 (#90000243)	9 Gregory St. 42°35′40″N 70°59′34″W	Middleton	Incorrectly listed on the register at 4 Gregory St.
168	Gen. Israel Putnam House	Gen. Israel Putnam House	April 30, 1976 (#76000235)	431 Maple St. 42°34′57″N 70°58′02″W	Danvers	
169	James Putnam Jr. House	James Putnam Jr. House	March 9, 1990 (#90000205)	42 Summer St. 42°34′33″N 70°56′58″W	Danvers	
170	Rea-Proctor Homestead	Rea-Proctor Homestead	June 2, 1982 (#82001915)	180 Conant Road; 42°34′13″N 70°54′53″W	Danvers	
171	Ridgewood Cemetery	Ridgewood Cemetery	February 8, 2016 (#15001049)	177 Salem St. 42°40′49″N 71°06′09″W	North Andover	
172	River Road-Cross Street Historic District	River Road-Cross Street Historic District	May 26, 2005 (#05000465)	Cross, Prospect Sts., River, Salem Rds. 42°37′59″N 70°57′35″W	Topsfield	
173	Rockport Downtown Main Street Historic District	Rockport Downtown Main Street Historic District	May 28, 1976 (#76000288)	Portions of Main, Cleaves, Jewett, and School Sts. 42°39′29″N 70°37′11″W	Rockport	
174	Rockport High School	Rockport High School	May 30, 1997 (#97000498)	4 Broadway; 42°39′28″N 70°37′03″W	Rockport	
175	Old Rockport High School	Old Rockport High School	May 12, 2004 (#04000424)	58 Broadway; 42°39′19″N 70°37′22″W	Rockport	
176	Rocks Village Historic District	Rocks Village Historic District	December 12, 1976 (#76001967)	Northeast of Haverhill at the Merrimack River; 42°48′33″N 71°00′08″W	Haverhill	
177	Rocky Hill Meetinghouse and Parsonage	Rocky Hill Meetinghouse and Parsonage	April 11, 1972 (#72000115)	4 Old Portsmouth Rd. 42°51′02″N 70°54′39″W	Amesbury	
178	Rowley Village Forge Site	Rowley Village Forge Site	March 2, 2001 (#01000201)	Between Middleton and Topsfield Rds. 42°38′52″N 70°59′25″W	Boxford	
179	St. Michael's Church	St. Michael's Church	June 18, 1973 (#73000305)	26 Pleasant St. 42°30′15″N 70°51′05″W	Marblehead	
180	Salem Village Historic District	Salem Village Historic District	January 31, 1975 (#75000252)	Irregular pattern along Centre, Hobart, Ingersoll, and Collins Sts., as far north as Brentwood Circle, and south to Mello Parkway; 42°34′00″N 70°57′38″W	Danvers	
181	Samuel Brown School	Samuel Brown School	August 12, 2009 (#09000611)	200 Lynn St. 42°30′13″N 70°57′08″W	Peabody	
182	Saugus Iron Works National Historic Site	Saugus Iron Works National Historic Site	October 15, 1966 (#66000047)	Off U.S. Route 1; 42°28′04″N 71°00′32″W	Saugus	
183	Saugus Town Hall	Saugus Town Hall	June 20, 1985 (#85001332)	Central St. 42°27′54″N 71°00′35″W	Saugus	
184	Sawyer House	Sawyer House	March 9, 1990 (#90000194)	21 Endicott Rd. 42°37′41″N 70°58′39″W	Boxford	
185	School Street School	School Street School	October 23, 1986 (#86002922)	40 School St. 42°46′30″N 71°04′18″W	Haverhill	
186	Seaside Park	Seaside Park	June 8, 2011 (#11000333)	Atlantic Ave. 42°29′46″N 70°51′30″W	Marblehead	
187	Second O'Shea Building	Second O'Shea Building	March 27, 1980 (#80004237)	9-13 Peabody Sq. 42°31′32″N 70°55′40″W	Peabody	
188	Sewall-Scripture House	Sewall-Scripture House	September 30, 1982 (#82001902)	40 King St. 42°39′27″N 70°37′37″W	Rockport	
189	Hazadiah Smith House	Hazadiah Smith House	March 9, 1990 (#90000200)	337 Cabot St. 42°33′16″N 70°52′43″W	Beverly	
190	Soldiers and Sailors Memorial Building	Soldiers and Sailors Memorial Building	August 22, 2016 (#16000544)	363 Main St. 42°47′59″N 70°59′28″W	West Newbury	
191	Southwick House	Southwick House	November 29, 1983 (#83003974)	151 Lowell St. 42°31′50″N 70°56′12″W	Peabody	
192	Spencer-Pierce-Little House	Spencer-Pierce-Little House	November 24, 1968 (#68000043)	Little's Lane; 42°47′39″N 70°51′15″W	Newbury	
193	Spofford-Barnes House	Spofford-Barnes House	September 6, 1974 (#74000366)	Kelsey Rd. 42°41′01″N 70°59′06″W	Boxford	
194	Sprague House	Sprague House	July 2, 1987 (#87001108)	59 Endicott St. 42°33′00″N 70°55′38″W	Danvers	
195	State Lunatic Hospital at Danvers	State Lunatic Hospital at Danvers	January 26, 1984 (#84002436)	450 Maple St. 42°34′58″N 70°58′30″W	Danvers	
196	Abiel Stevens House	Abiel Stevens House	June 23, 1983 (#83000585)	280 Salem St. 42°40′50″N 71°06′00″W	North Andover	
197	Story Grammar School	Story Grammar School	March 13, 1986 (#86000378)	140 Elm St. 42°30′16″N 70°51′19″W	Marblehead	
198	Straightsmouth Island Light	Straightsmouth Island Light	June 15, 1987 (#87001487)	Straightsmouth Island; 42°39′31″N 70°35′10″W	Rockport	
199	Superior Courthouse and Bartlett Mall	Superior Courthouse and Bartlett Mall	April 30, 1976 (#76000280)	Bounded by High, Pond, Auburn, and Greenleaf Sts. 42°48′07″N 70°52′30″W	Newburyport	
200	Sutton Block	Sutton Block	September 5, 1985 (#85002012)	76-78 Main St. 42°31′30″N 70°55′32″W	Peabody	
201	Swampscott Cemetery	Swampscott Cemetery	March 6, 2013 (#13000051)	400 Essex St. 42°29′00″N 70°54′47″W	Swampscott	
202	Swampscott Fish House	Swampscott Fish House	May 16, 1985 (#85001120)	Humphrey St. 42°28′03″N 70°54′37″W	Swampscott	
203	Swampscott Railroad Depot	Swampscott Railroad Depot	August 28, 1998 (#98001106)	10 Railroad Ave. 42°28′25″N 70°55′22″W	Swampscott	
204	Tavern Acres Historic District	Tavern Acres Historic District	September 29, 1995 (#95001134)	Bounded by Bradstreet Rd., Green and Main Sts., and Park Way; 42°41′42″N 71°07′34″W	North Andover	
205	Elihu Thomson House	Elihu Thomson House	January 7, 1976 (#76002002)	33 Elmwood Ave. 42°28′11″N 70°55′08″W	Swampscott	
206	Capt. John Thorndike House	Capt. John Thorndike House	March 9, 1990 (#90000195)	184 Hale St. 42°34′49″N 70°50′23″W	Beverly	
207	Benaiah Titcomb House	Benaiah Titcomb House	March 9, 1990 (#90000208)	189 John Wise Ave. 42°39′05″N 70°47′49″W	Essex	
208	Topsfield Town Common District	Topsfield Town Common District	June 7, 1976 (#03001488)	N. Common, E. Common, S. Common, W. Common, High St. Ext., Washington, Main, High, and Howlett Sts. 42°38′32″N 70°57′04″W	Topsfield	
209	Towne Farm	Towne Farm	August 1, 2012 (#12000455)	55 Towne Rd. 42°39′28″N 71°01′35″W	Boxford	
210	Rev. John Tufts House	Rev. John Tufts House	March 9, 1990 (#90000270)	750 Main St. 42°48′29″N 70°57′24″W	West Newbury	
211	Twin Lights Historic District-Cape Ann Light Station	Twin Lights Historic District-Cape Ann Light Station	October 7, 1971 (#71000355)	1 mi (1.6 km) east of Rockport on Thacher Island; 42°38′15″N 70°34′36″W	Rockport	
212	Union Congregational Church	Union Congregational Church	November 5, 2014 (#14000894)	350-354 Main St. 42°50′30″N 70°55′26″W	Amesbury	
213	United Shoe Machinery Corporation Clubhouse	United Shoe Machinery Corporation Clubhouse	November 26, 1982 (#82000484)	134 McKay St. 42°33′52″N 70°53′43″W	Beverly	
214	US Customhouse	US Customhouse	February 25, 1971 (#71000089)	25 Water St. 42°48′44″N 70°52′09″W	Newburyport	
215	US Post Office-Beverly Main	US Post Office-Beverly Main	June 4, 1986 (#86001210)	161 Rantoul St. 42°32′50″N 70°53′04″W	Beverly	
216	US Post Office-Newburyport Main	US Post Office-Newburyport Main	June 18, 1986 (#86001341)	61 Pleasant St. 42°48′38″N 70°52′22″W	Newburyport	
217	Walker Body Company Factory	Walker Body Company Factory	September 28, 2007 (#07000512)	Oak St. at River Court; 42°51′10″N 70°55′27″W	Amesbury	
218	Washington Street Historic District	Washington Street Historic District	September 12, 1985 (#85002380)	Washington, Main, Holton and Sewall Sts. 42°31′23″N 70°55′28″W	Peabody	
219	Washington Street Shoe District	Washington Street Shoe District	October 14, 1976 (#76000257)	Washington, Wingate, Emerson Sts. Railroad and Washington Sqs. 42°46′25″N 71°05′05″W	Haverhill	
220	Wenham Historic District	Wenham Historic District	April 13, 1973 (#73000852)	Both sides of Main St. between Beverly and Hamilton city lines 42°35′53″N 70°53′20″W	Wenham	
221	White-Preston House	White-Preston House	March 9, 1990 (#90000204)	592 Maple St. 42°35′28″N 70°58′50″W	Danvers	
222	John Greenleaf Whittier House	John Greenleaf Whittier House	October 15, 1966 (#66000792)	86 Friend St. 42°51′20″N 70°56′08″W	Amesbury	
223	Winter Street School	Winter Street School	April 10, 2017 (#100000849)	165 Winter St. 42°46′40″N 71°05′02″W	Haverhill	
224	Woodberry-Quarrels House	Woodberry-Quarrels House	March 9, 1990 (#90000224)	180 Bridge St. 42°36′55″N 70°50′42″W	Hamilton	
225	Peter Woodbury House	Peter Woodbury House	March 9, 1990 (#90000201)	82 Dodge St. 42°34′42″N 70°53′22″W	Beverly	

== See also ==
- List of National Historic Landmarks in Massachusetts
- National Register of Historic Places listings in Massachusetts
