= East Parish Meeting House =

Historic church in Massachusetts, United States

- U.S. National Register of Historic Places
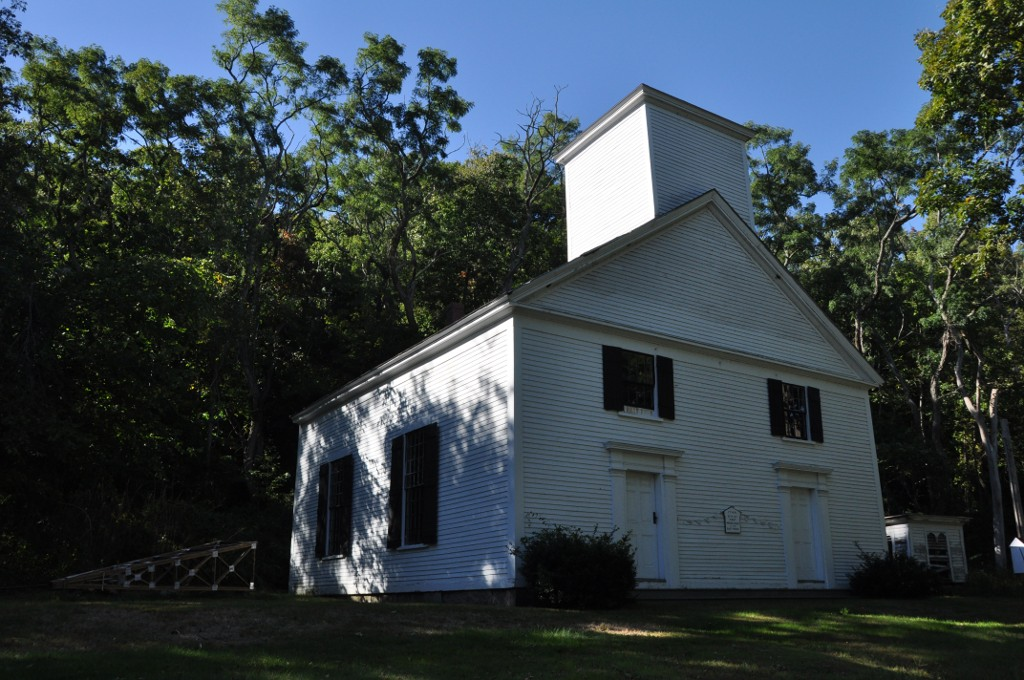

- Location within Massachusetts Location within the United States
- Location: 150 Middle Road, Haverhill, Massachusetts
- Coordinates: 42°48′1″N 71°2′1″W
- Built: 1838
- Architectural style: Colonial
- NRHP reference No.: 11000149
- Added to NRHP: March 29, 2011

The East Parish Meeting House, also known as the Fourth Parish Meeting House, is a historic church and meeting house on the rural east side of Haverhill, Massachusetts that is beautifully restored and currently used as a venue for weddings, services, open mics, community dinners and meetings, and more. The 1 1/2-story wood frame Greek Revival building was built in 1838, replacing a previous meeting house that was built on the site in 1744. The Meeting House was used for regular services until 1906, when its congregation merged with the nearby Riverside Memorial Church. The East Parish Meeting House was listed on the National Register of Historic Places in 2011. The building is now owned by a neighborhood association.

== Description and history ==
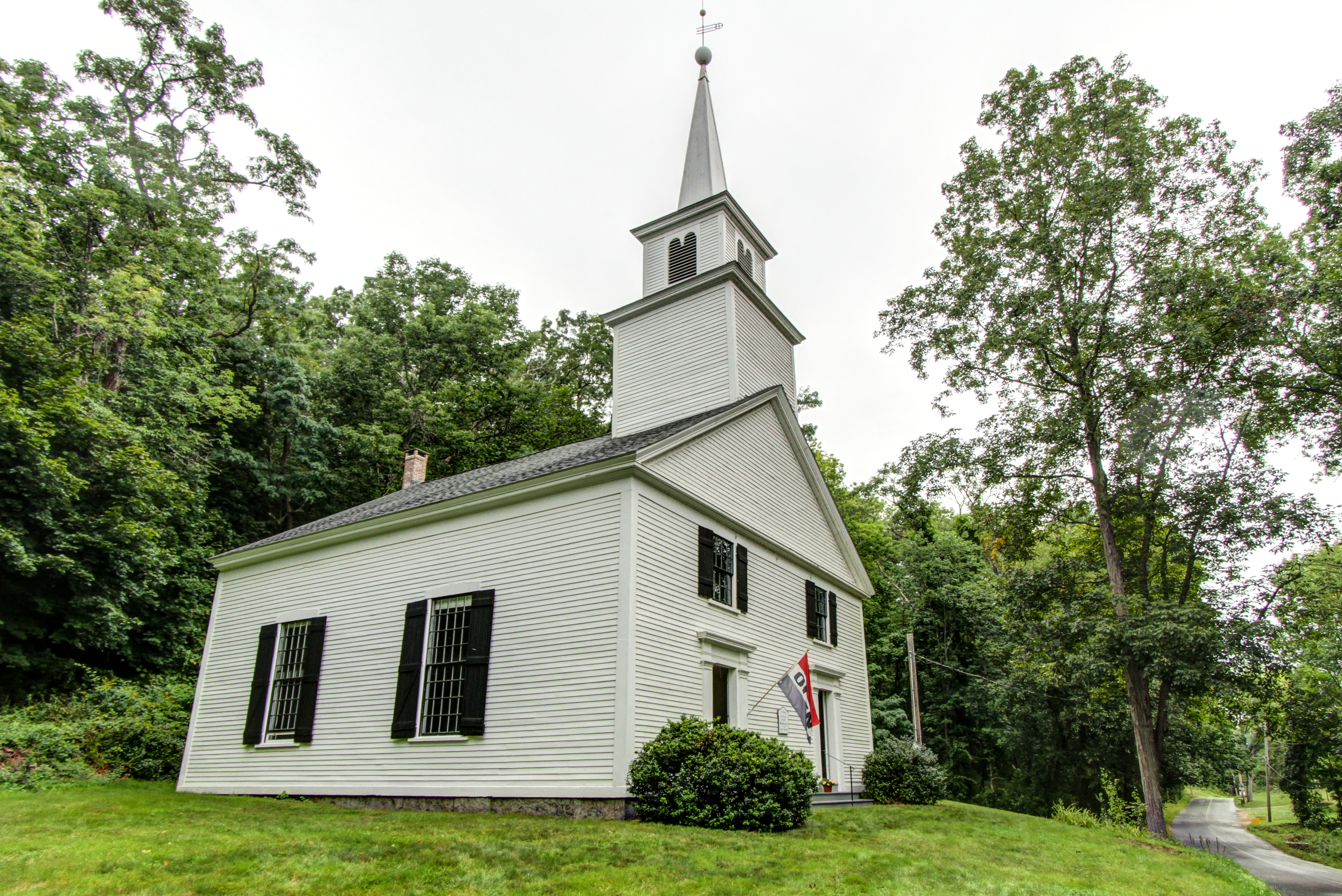
Charming, beautifully restored 1838 historic Meeting House listed on National and State Registers of Historic Places. Photo circa 2021.

The East Parish Meeting House is set on the west side of Middle Road in a rural part of eastern Haverhill. The building faces roughly southeast, and is a wood-frame structure with a clapboarded exterior, a front-facing gable roof and a granite foundation. Four enormous windows flood the sanctuary with sunlight. The three-stage steeple tower includes a steeple box, and belfry and steeple spire which were restored in 2014. The building shows simple Greek Revival styling, with narrow corner boards and entablature, with a fully pedimented gable. The pair of entrances are the most elaborate element, with flanking pilasters rising to entablatures with a projecting cornice above each entrance. Square sash windows are located above each entrance. The interior is largely unaltered since the building's construction in 1838, with a large sanctuary and rows of bench pews, and a balcony or gallery overlooking the sanctuary. A gas-lit chandelier installed in the 19th century and oil lamps along the walls help light the building at night. Electricity is available via a pole on the property site. The property also includes the archaeological remnants of a series of carriage sheds that stood south of the main building until they were destroyed by fire in 1928.

Haverhill's Fourth Parish was organized in 1743 and had its first meeting the following year. As its name implies, it was the third parish to split from Haverhill's First Parish, established in 1641; the Third Parish was eventually incorporated as Methuen. The congregation was always relatively small, and did not always have a full-time minister, meeting irregularly for 20 years from the 1770s to the 1790s. Its original meetinghouse was torn down in 1838, replaced by the current building. However, funding continued to be limited, and the congregation eventually merged with the nearby Riverside Congregational Church in 1906. Many of the East Parish records were apparently lost when that church burned down. The building was maintained by the East Parish Sewing Society, which held social events in the building. The building continues to be maintained by a local non-profit community organization, and is used for occasional non-denominational religious services and is available for many other purposes.

== See also ==
- National Register of Historic Places listings in Essex County, Massachusetts
