= William Livermore House =

Historic house in Massachusetts, United States

- U.S. National Register of Historic Places
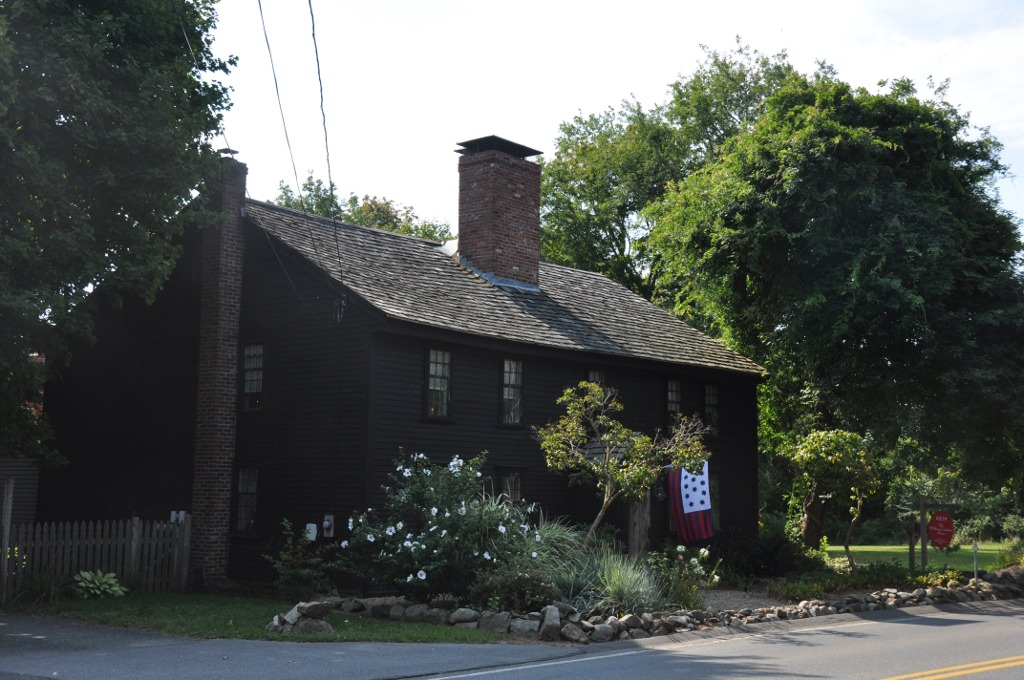

- Location within Massachusetts Location within the United States
- Location: Beverly, Massachusetts
- Coordinates: 42°34′0″N 70°51′41″W
- Built: 1700
- Architectural style: Colonial
- MPS: First Period Buildings of Eastern Massachusetts TR
- NRHP reference No.: 90000197
- Added to NRHP: March 9, 1990

The William Livermore House is a historic First Period house in Beverly, Massachusetts. It is a 2.5-story five-bay colonial wood-frame house that was built in stages. The oldest part of the house, the right front, was built c. 1700, along with the chimney. The left side was added early in the Second Period, and a major addition was made to the rear, adding another row of rooms and a new roof. As a result, the chimney, which normally protrudes through the ridge of the roof in First Period houses, instead protrudes through the front of the roof.

The house was listed on the National Register of Historic Places in 1990.

== See also ==
- National Register of Historic Places listings in Essex County, Massachusetts
