= Beverly Powder House =

- U.S. National Register of Historic Places
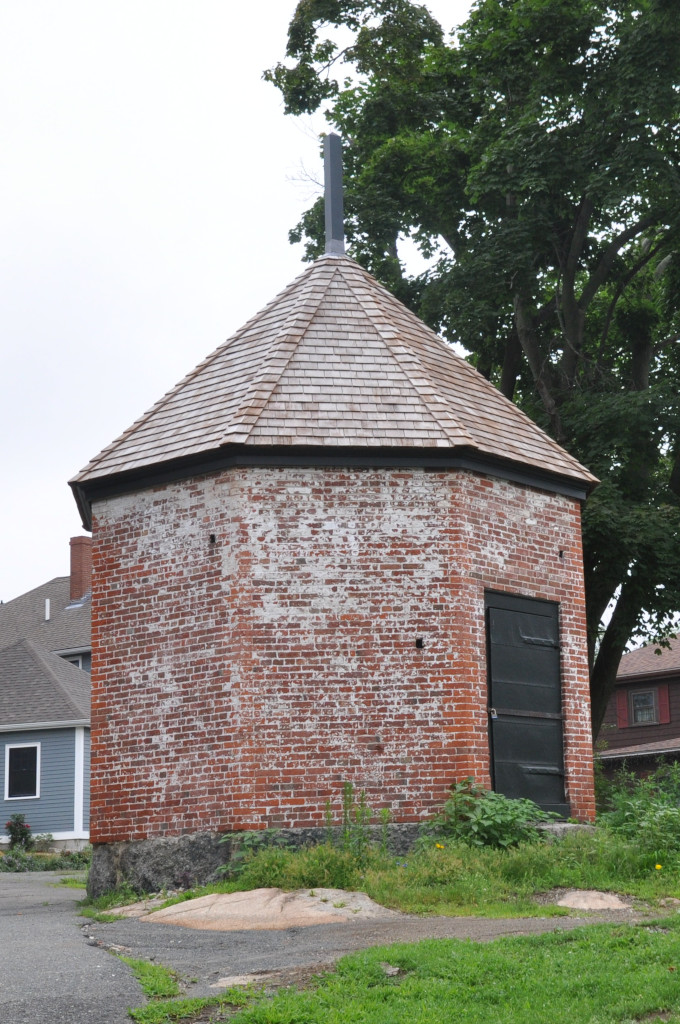
- 2021 photo

- Location within Massachusetts Location within the United States
- Location: Powder House Lane, Beverly, Massachusetts
- Coordinates: 42°33′12″N 70°52′31″W
- Area: less than one acre
- Built: 1809
- NRHP reference No.: 100004267
- Added to NRHP: August 15, 2019

The Beverly Powder House is a historic military storage magazine on Powder House Lane in Beverly, Massachusetts. Built in 1809, this small brick building housed the community's military supplies during the War of 1812, and is one of a few such structures to survive in the state. It is the town's only surviving Federal-period municipal structure. It was listed on the National Register of Historic Places in 2019.

== Description and history ==
The Beverly Powder House is located on a rise overlooking the town's center, which is located to the southwest. It stands on the east side of Powder House Lane north of Madison Avenue, amid residences built in the late 19th and 20th centuries. It is an eight-sided brick structure, with a shingled roof built on a wood frame mounted over a brick dome. The walls have no windows, but are designed to allow for the passage of air through the structure, with circuitous passages through the brickwork. The building is 17.5 feet (5.3 m) in diameter near its base, and rises 12.5 feet (3.8 m) from its stone foundation to the eaves. It has a wooden door fastened to a frame by iron strap hinges. The interior is finished with rough wooden siding, with shelving fastened to framing embedded into the brick walls by wooden pegs.

The powder house was built in 1809 and was the third munitions storage facility built by the town. Its first was built nearer the town center in 1767. In addition to the construction of this building, the town also authorized construction of a structure to house two cannons and associated equipment; it has not survived, and its location is not known. The building's only significant military use came during the War of 1812, when local militia were mustered after a British attack on nearby Gloucester. It was taken out of service in 1840, as the state transitioned to more centralized armories for militia munitions.

== See also ==
- National Register of Historic Places listings in Essex County, Massachusetts
