= House at 922 Dale Street =

Historic house in Massachusetts, United States

- U.S. National Register of Historic Places
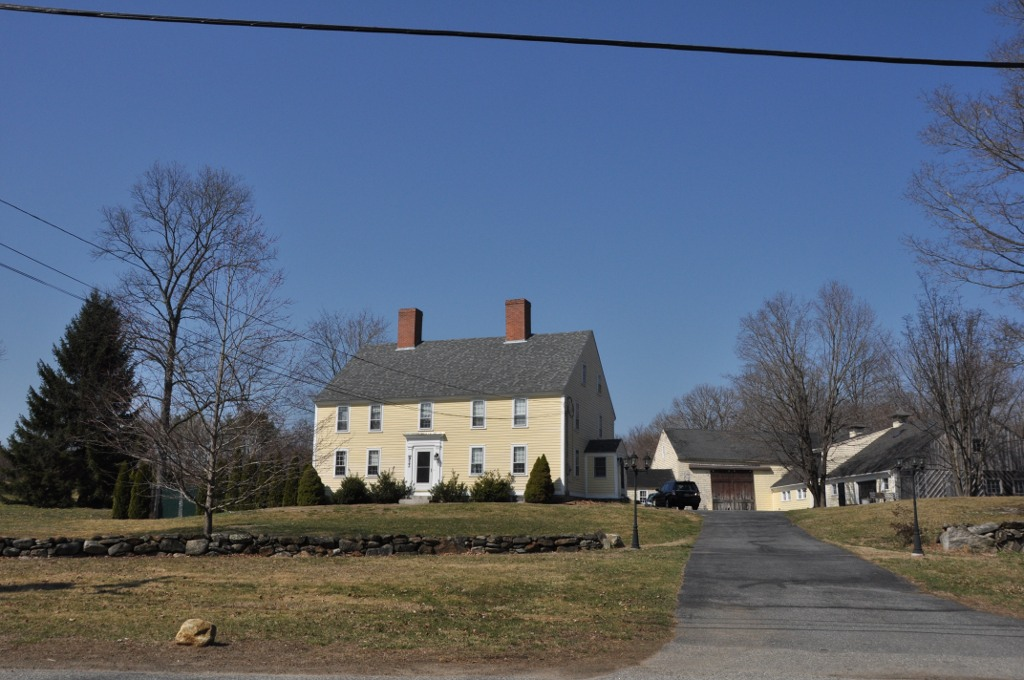

- Location within Massachusetts Location within the United States
- Location: 922 Dale St., North Andover, Massachusetts
- Coordinates: 42°41′40″N 71°4′7″W
- Built: 1700
- Architectural style: Colonial, Federal
- MPS: First Period Buildings of Eastern Massachusetts TR
- NRHP reference No.: 90000248
- Added to NRHP: March 9, 1990

The house at 922 Dale Street is a historic First Period house in North Andover, Massachusetts. It is a 2.5-story wood-frame house, five bays wide, with a small side porch and a rear single story addition. The oldest part of the house is the right rear portion, which is estimated to have been built in the first quarter of the 18th century, along with a central chimney. Sometime between 1740 and 1780 rooms were added to its left. A major renovation during the Federal period removed the central chimney (replacing it with the extant twin chimneys), and added rooms in front of the earlier ones, giving the main block of the house its rectangular shape. The interior has some well preserved Federal period details.

The house was added to the National Register of Historic Places in 1990.

== See also ==
- National Register of Historic Places listings in Essex County, Massachusetts
- List of the oldest buildings in Massachusetts
