= Palmer School =

- U.S. National Register of Historic Places
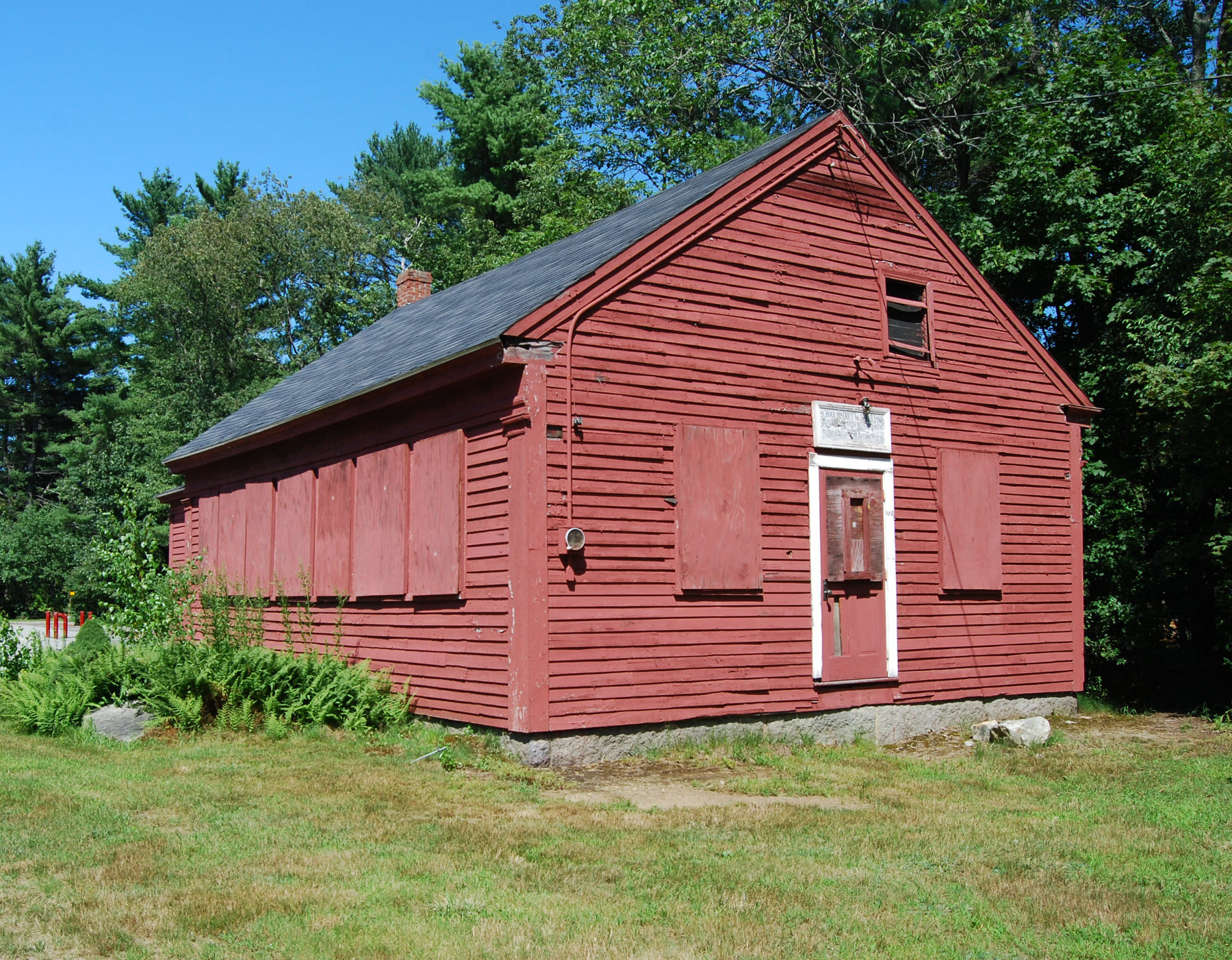

- Location within Massachusetts Location within the United States
- Location: 33 Main St., Boxford, Massachusetts
- Coordinates: 42°39′33″N 71°00′06″W
- Built: 1845
- Architectural style: Greek Revival
- NRHP reference No.: 98000122
- Added to NRHP: February 20, 1998

The Palmer School, also known as the District No. 2 Schoolhouse, is a historic 19th-century one-room schoolhouse at 33 Main Street in Boxford, Massachusetts. Built in 1845, it is the town's last surviving 19th-century school building. It was used as a school until 1931, replaced by the Cole School, on whose grounds it stands. The building was listed on the National Register of Historic Places in 1998.

== Overview ==
The former Palmer School building is located west of the Boxford village center, near the junction of Main Street and the south access road for the Harry Cole School. It is a single-story wood frame structure with a gabled roof. It has very minimal Greek Revival styling reflective of its construction date in 1845. The western gable end of the structure has the main door, flanked by windows, while the long side of the building has seven windows, although it previously had only four. The eastern end has three standard double hung windows, with a small eye window in the gable.

The building was built in 1845, during a period of prosperity in the town, during which it updated all of its district school buildings. It was used as a school facility from 1845 until 1931. In 1918 it was named in honor of Dr. Julius Palmer, a jeweler who had retired to the town. Its window alterations date to the 1920s. In 1931 it was sold by the town, and was moved to its present location for use as a community center, made as a gift of the purchaser, Edna Rich Morse. It was eventually donated back to the town, and has intermittently been used for a number of municipal functions, including for municipal offices, and as a kindergarten facility.

== See also ==
- Boxford Village Historic District
- National Register of Historic Places listings in Essex County, Massachusetts
