= Larch Farm =

- U.S. National Register of Historic Places
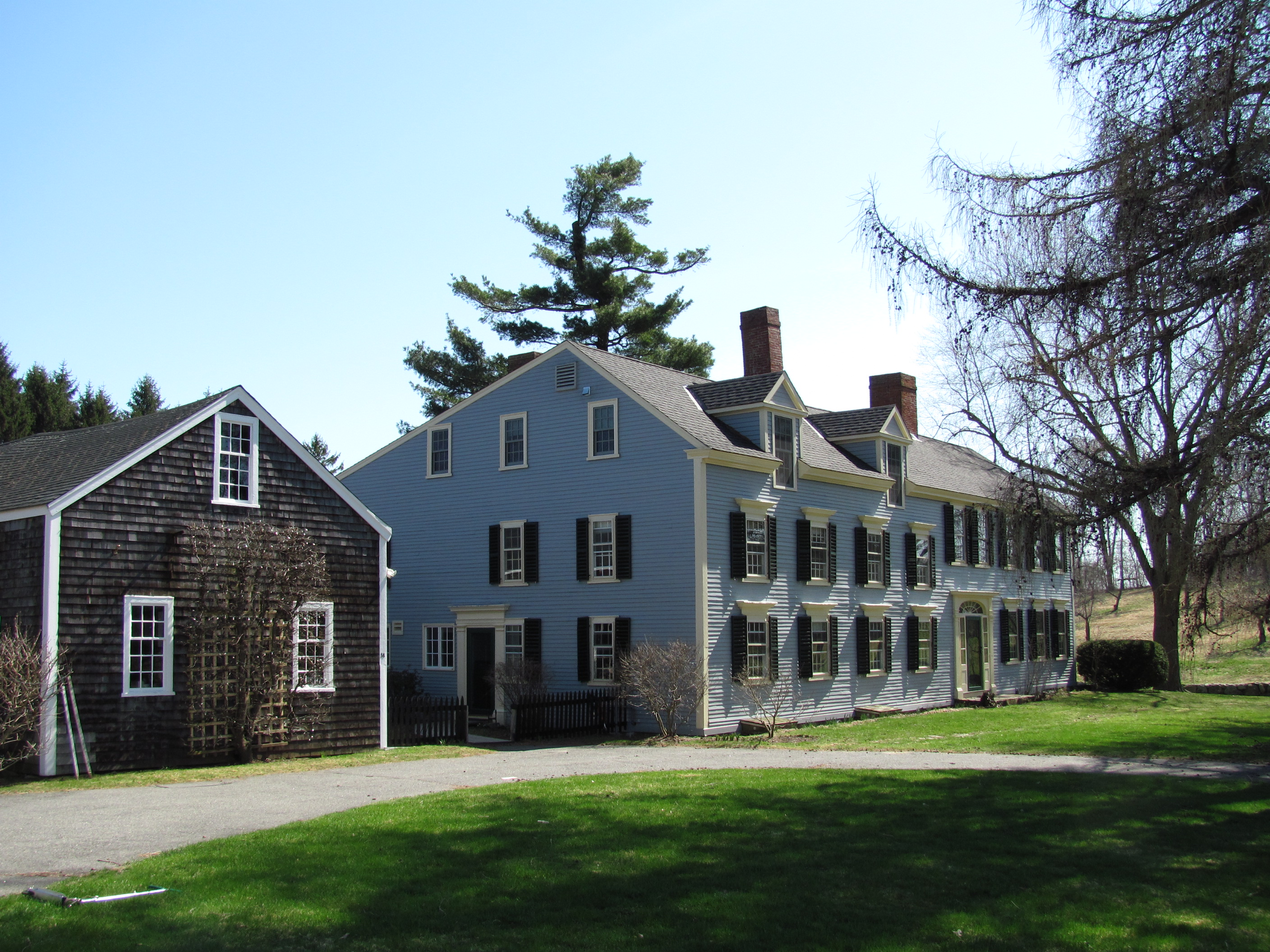
- Larch Farm

- Location within Massachusetts Location within the United States
- Location: 38 Larch Road, Wenham, Massachusetts
- Coordinates: 42°36′8″N 70°52′45″W
- Built: 1700
- Architectural style: Colonial
- MPS: First Period Buildings of Eastern Massachusetts TR
- NRHP reference No.: 90000266
- Added to NRHP: March 9, 1990

The Larch Farm, also known as the Goldsmith-Pickering House, is a historic First Period farmhouse in Wenham, Massachusetts. The house is a large colonial 2 1/2-story wood-frame house, eight bays wide. The northern half of the house is three bays deep, and the southern half is two deep. Its complicated construction history begins in 1700, when Zaccheus Goldsmith was given permission to take timber for the purpose of building a house 40 feet (12 m) wide and 20 feet (6.1 m) deep. This structure was two stories high, with a leanto section in the rear and a chimney on its right. An addition during the Georgian period removed that chimney and doubled the size of the house, and moved the front door to the north side. A wing was added on the south during the 1780s, and the exterior was remodeled later to give the house a Federal style appearance. The interior of the house includes surviving decorative features from all three periods of construction.

The house is also notable for its purchase in 1806 by Timothy Pickering, a former United States Secretary of State. Pickering transformed the Goldsmith property into a rural country estate, planting linden and larch trees on the grounds. The house was listed on the National Register of Historic Places in 1990.

== See also ==
- National Register of Historic Places listings in Essex County, Massachusetts
