= School Street School (Haverhill, Massachusetts) =

- U.S. National Register of Historic Places
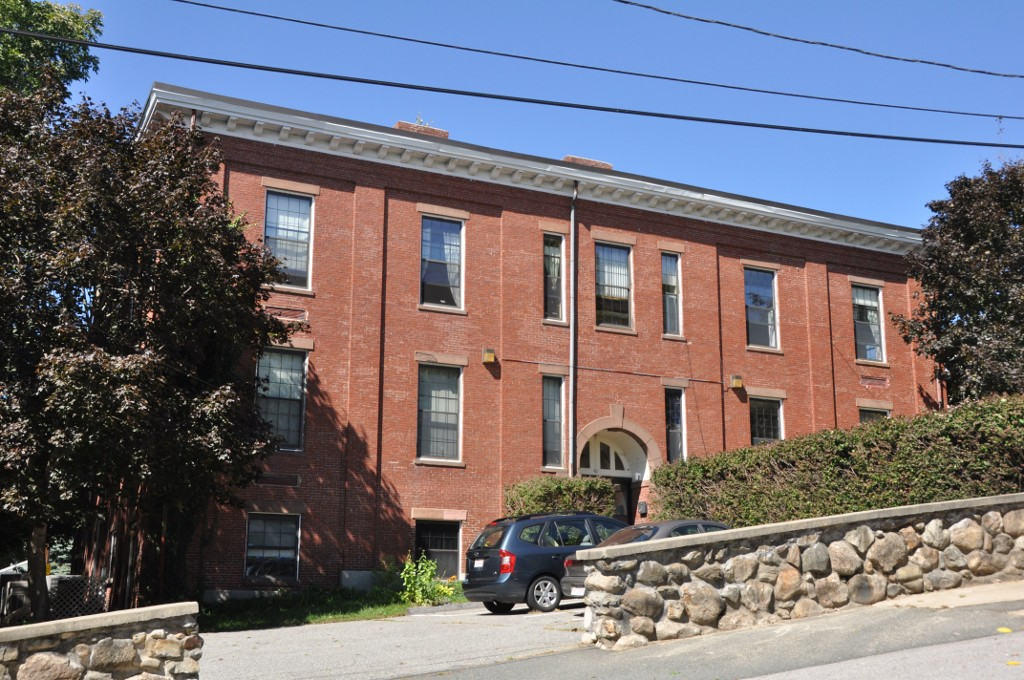

- Location within Massachusetts Location within the United States
- Location: 40 School St., Haverhill, Massachusetts
- Coordinates: 42°46′30″N 71°4′18″W
- Area: less than one acre
- Built: 1856
- Architect: Joseph R. Richards
- Architectural style: Eclectic 19th century
- NRHP reference No.: 86002922
- Added to NRHP: October 23, 1986

The School Street School is a historic school building at 40 School Street in Haverhill, Massachusetts, United States. The brick three-story building was designed by Joseph R. Richards and built in 1856. Stylistically it is a mixture of a number of popular revival styles of the mid-19th century. The building is located on a hill, and appears from some elevations to only have two stories. Its main entrances are located inside round brownstone arches, a typical Romanesque Revival feature. Its roof line features a deep, bracketed cornice, a typical Italianate feature. The bays of the north and south elevations are separated by decorated brick pilasters, a Greek Revival element. The building has a shallow hip roof which was originally topped by a cupola (removed during the early 20th century).

The building was listed on the National Register of Historic Places in 1986.

== See also ==
- National Register of Historic Places listings in Essex County, Massachusetts
