= Putnam House =

Putnam House may refer to:

== Connecticut ==
- Putnam Cottage or Knapp's Tavern, a historic tavern where General Israel Putnam escaped the British forces

== Massachusetts ==
- Rea Putnam Fowler House, a historic house in Danvers
- Rev. Daniel Putnam House, a historic house in North Reading
- Deacon Edward Putnam Jr. House, a historic house in Middleton
- Edward Putnam House, a historic house in Sutton
- General Israel Putnam House, Danvers birthplace of Major General Israel Putnam
- James Putnam Jr. House, a historic house in Danvers
- Otis Putnam House, a historic house in Worcester
- General Rufus Putnam House, a National Historic Landmark in Rutland

== Ohio ==
- The Anchorage (Marietta, Ohio), also known as the Putnam House, in Harmar (Marietta), built by Douglas Putnam, great grandson of General Israel Putnam
- David Putnam House, site of the first bank corporation in the Northwest Territories, in Harmar (Marietta), built by David Putnam, grandson of General Israel Putnam and father of David Putnam, Jr., the abolitionist
- Rufus Putnam House, a historic home in Marietta, built by General Rufus Putnam
