= Essex Technical High School =

High school in Massachusetts, United States

Location
- 42.5921°N 70.9786°W

Information
- School type: High school
- Established: 2016; 10 years ago
- Website: essexnorthshore.org

Essex Technical High School is a career technical high school located in Hathorne, Massachusetts, United States which is a sub-section of Danvers, Massachusetts. It was opened in the Fall of 2016 after the merger of North Shore Technical High School and Essex Agricultural & Technical High School, along with several programs from Peabody Vocational School.
