= House plan =

Set of blueprints for a house

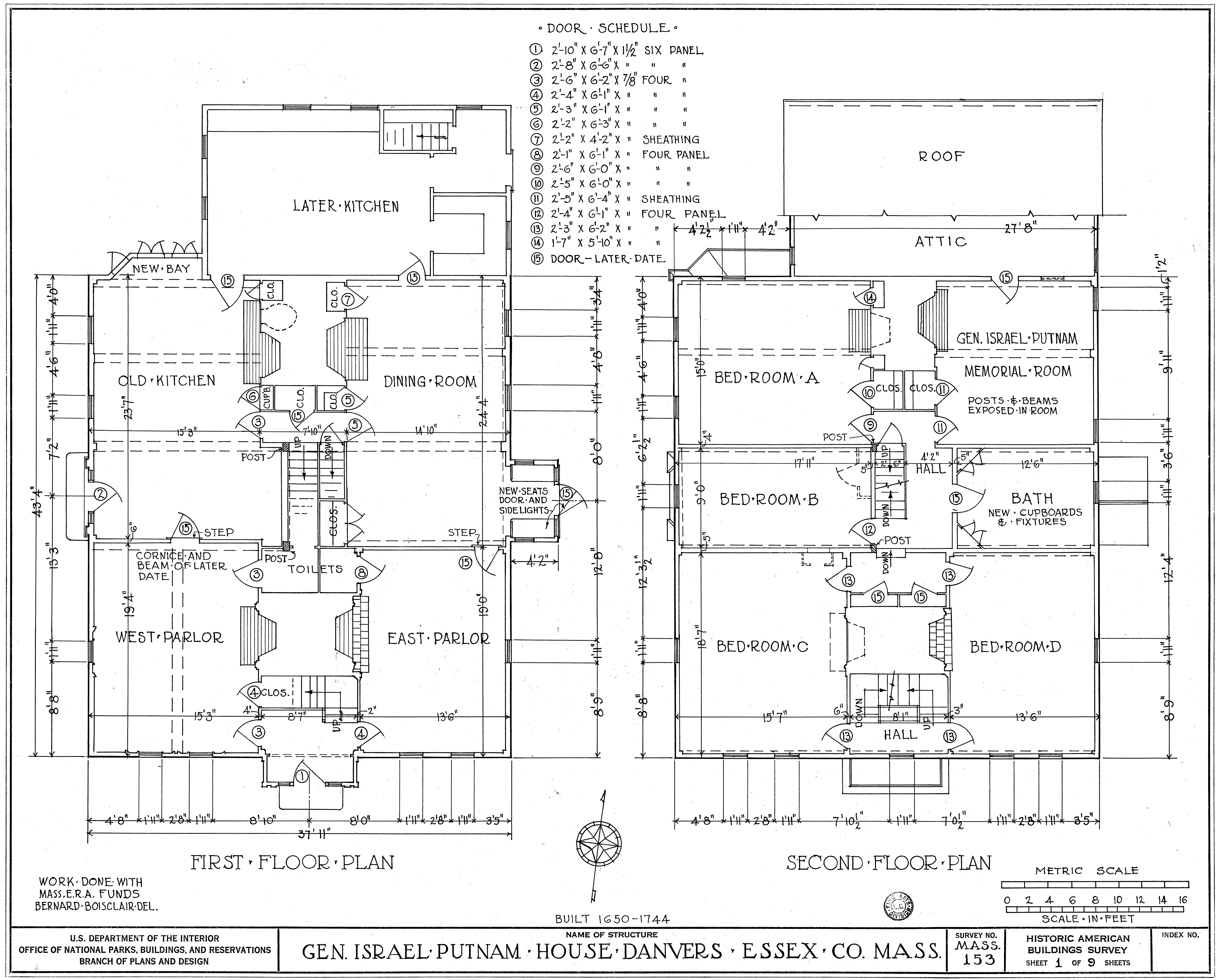
Floor plans of the Putnam House

A house plan is a set of construction or working drawings (sometimes called blueprints) that define all the construction specifications of a residential house (home or dwelling) such as the dimensions, materials, layouts, installation methods and techniques.

== Drawing set ==
The principal information provided in a set of blueprint drawings is as follows:

- Site plans are detailed drawings that show a home's position on its property, viewed from above. They illustrate how the home relates to the lot's boundaries and surroundings. Site plans should outline location of utility services, setback requirements, easements, location of driveways and walkways, and sometimes even topographical data that specifies the slope of the terrain.
- A floor plan is an overhead view of the completed house. On the plan, you will see parallel lines that scale at whatever width the walls are required to be. Dimensions are usually drawn between the walls to specify room sizes and wall lengths. Floor plans will also indicate rooms, all the doors and windows and any built-in elements, such as plumbing fixtures, cabinets, water heaters, furnaces, etc. Floor plans will include notes to specify finishes, construction methods, or symbols for electrical items.
- Elevations are a non-perspective view of the home. These are drawn to scale so that measurements can be taken for any aspect necessary. Plans include front, rear and both side elevations. The elevations specify ridge heights, the positioning of the final fall of the land, exterior finishes, roof pitches and other details that are necessary to give the home its exterior architectural styling.
- A section provides a cross-sectional view of a building, illustrating a "cut-through" at a specific location indicated on the floor plan. It reveals details about the construction process and showcases the intended appearance of internal finishes. Sections are used because they explain certain conditions in more detail. These conditions may include ceiling height, ceiling type (flat or vault), and window and door dimensions.
- Foundation plan outlines the dimensions and precise locations of footings, providing a detailed guide for the building’s structural base.
- Framing plan details the wall construction, specifying the size of the lumber to be used, typically usually 2x4 or 2x6.
- The sub-floor plan provides construction details for this area, including the arrangement of services (such as plumbing and framing structures).
- Roof plans outline the type of roof and materials to use, its pitch and framing structure required.
- Interior elevation drawings provides detailed views of interior walls that showcase their design and layout.
- Detail drawings highlight specific features like built-in shelving, moldings, and columns, providing precise construction guidelines.
- Schedules list specifications for various elements such as windows and doors, including dimensions and materials.
- Structural layouts present the arrangement of critical load-bearing components to ensure stability.
- Electrical and telecoms drawings show locations of all the outlets, TV sockets, switches and fixtures. They also indicate which switches operate which lights and where the electric lines should be run.
- Plumbing schematic drawing illustrate the placement of plumbing fixtures and the layout of piping systems.
- Subdivision plans (also known as an allotment plans or strata plans) show information regarding adjoining properties. This includes:
  - Sketch plan: A basic layout of the lots and public infrastructure
  - Preliminary plat: A more detailed plan that shows building footprints and measurements
  - Final plat: The official document that creates the new lots
  - Block sizes: The dimensions of the blocks of land
  - Easements: Any other details about the land

== Lines and symbols ==
House plans use the following lines and symbols to convey the relationship between objects:

- Dimension lines, which consist of a solid line with a mark at either end; space between the two marks equals the distance noted next to the line.
- Wall, indicated by thick solid lines between rooms.
- Partial height wall, a low wall that doesn't extend all the way up to the ceiling.
- Thin solid lines are used for built-in structures (such as cabinets, bookshelves, or plumbing fixtures).
- Thin dotted lines indicate overhead features, such as wall cabinets in a kitchen or a special ceiling treatment or an archway in the living room.
- North arrow would be a symbol—usually a simple arrow or a compass rose—used to indicate the direction of true north on the floor plan.
- Doors:
  - Door swing
  - Bifold doors
  - Passage (hinged) doors
  - Sliding glass door
  - French door
- Window, small breaks between exterior walls often indicate a window
- Toilet, often indicated as a circle adjacent to a rectangle in the bathroom
- Bathtub, often indicated as a large oval or rectangle when indicating a tub/shower combination
- Shower, a rectangular or square shape with an X running through it
- Bathroom sink, a rectangle with an oval and a dot in the center if it is a single vanity.
- Kitchen sink, typically shown as a rectangle with a dividing line (if double-basin) and placed within a counter outline, representing the primary location for dishwashing and food preparation.
- Kitchen range, illustrated as a square or rectangle with four small circles (representing burners) on top, indicating the stove and oven unit in the kitchen.
- Refrigerator, a small square with 'ref.' worded on it to signify the location placement of the refrigerator
- Washer/Dryer, depicted as adjacent labeled squares or rectangles, sometimes with a “W” and “D” inside, representing the location of laundry appliances.
- Tree, represented by a circular shape with radiating lines or branching patterns, symbolizing large outdoor vegetation in landscape plans.
- Shrub, shown as a smaller, denser circular or cloud-like shape, representing low-growing, bushy plants in exterior or garden layouts.

== Spaces and rooms ==
House plans generally include the following features, depending on the size and type of house:

- Bedroom
- Bathroom
- Kitchen
- Hall
- Entryway (sometimes denoted as a mudroom)
- Laundry room
- Living room (also known as a great room or family room)

== Open floor plan ==
An open floor plan emphasizes large, unobstructed spaces by minimizing or eliminating interior walls between the main living areas—typically the kitchen, dining, and living rooms. This layout creates a more spacious feel and promotes better interaction and flow among family members and guests.

The design is made possible by modern building technologies such as curtain wall technology, engineered lumber and truss systems, which allow for greater clear spans without the need for supporting walls. Open floor plans are especially popular for their flexibility, natural light, and ease of movement, making homes feel more modern and connected.
