= Samuel Putnam (disambiguation) =

Samuel Putnam (1892–1950) was an American translator and scholar of Romance languages.

Samuel Putnam may also refer to:

- Samuel Putnam (judge) (1768–1853), an associate justice of the Massachusetts Supreme Judicial Court
- Samuel Porter Putnam (1838–1896), an American freethinker, critic and publicist
- Samuel Putnam Bancroft (1846–1929), an American Christian Scientist and an early student of Mary Baker Eddy

== See also ==
- Putnam family
- Putnam House
