= Derby Summer House =

Historic house in Massachusetts, United States

- U.S. National Register of Historic Places
- U.S. National Historic Landmark
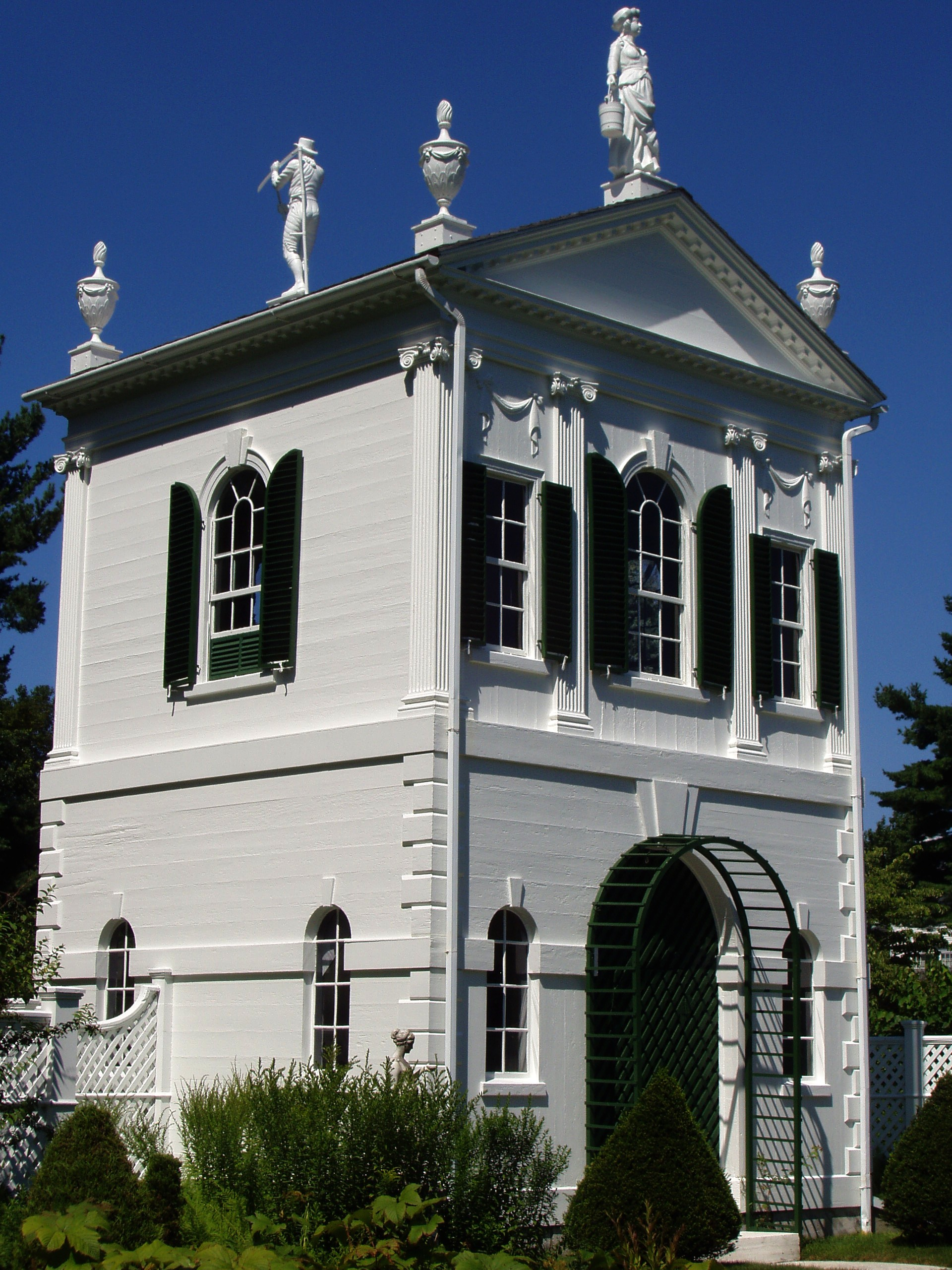
- Derby Summer House

- Location within Massachusetts Location within the United States
- Location: Danvers, Massachusetts
- Coordinates: 42°34′23.56″N 70°57′58.33″W
- Built: 1793
- Architect: McIntire, Samuel
- Architectural style: Federal
- NRHP reference No.: 68000020

Significant dates
- Added to NRHP: November 24, 1968
- Designated NHL: November 24, 1968

The Derby Summer House, also known as the McIntire Tea-house, is a summer house designed in 1793 by architect Samuel McIntire, now located on the grounds of the Glen Magna Farms, Danvers, Massachusetts. Since 1958 it has been owned by the Danvers Historical Society. A National Historic Landmark, it is significant as an extremely rare and well-preserved example of an 18th-century summer house, and also includes some of the earliest American sculpture in the carved wooden figures mounted on its roof.

== Description and history ==
Samuel McIntire designed this ornate Federal style garden house for Elias Hasket Derby's farm in Salem, Massachusetts. The structure is 20 feet square, 2½ stories high, decorated with pilasters, swags, and Grecian urns, and topped with rustic wood statues of a Reaper and Shepherdess (milkmaid). The ground floor is punctuated by central arched openings on the east and west facades, each flanked with arched windows with wooden keystones. The second floor is ornamented with swags and fluted Ionic pilasters at the corners and between windows. A young lady's diary from 1802 records her contemporary impressions:

The air from the windows is always pure and cool and the eye wanders with delight over the beautiful landscape below…The room is ornamented with some Chinese figures and seems calculated for serenity and peace.

The summer house was moved to its present location in 1901, about 4 miles from its original site, where it now opens onto a walled rose garden designed by Herbert Browne. Neither of the two statues atop the house are originals. The Shepherdess was missing when the house was transported; after 20 years she was found atop an Andover mill building, damaged by fire. A duplicate was carved in 1924, and the original is now on display in the Peabody Institute. The original Reaper fell in a storm in 1981. It too was reproduced; the original is in the Danvers Historical Society collection.

The summer house was declared a National Historic Landmark and listed on the National Register of Historic Places in 1968.

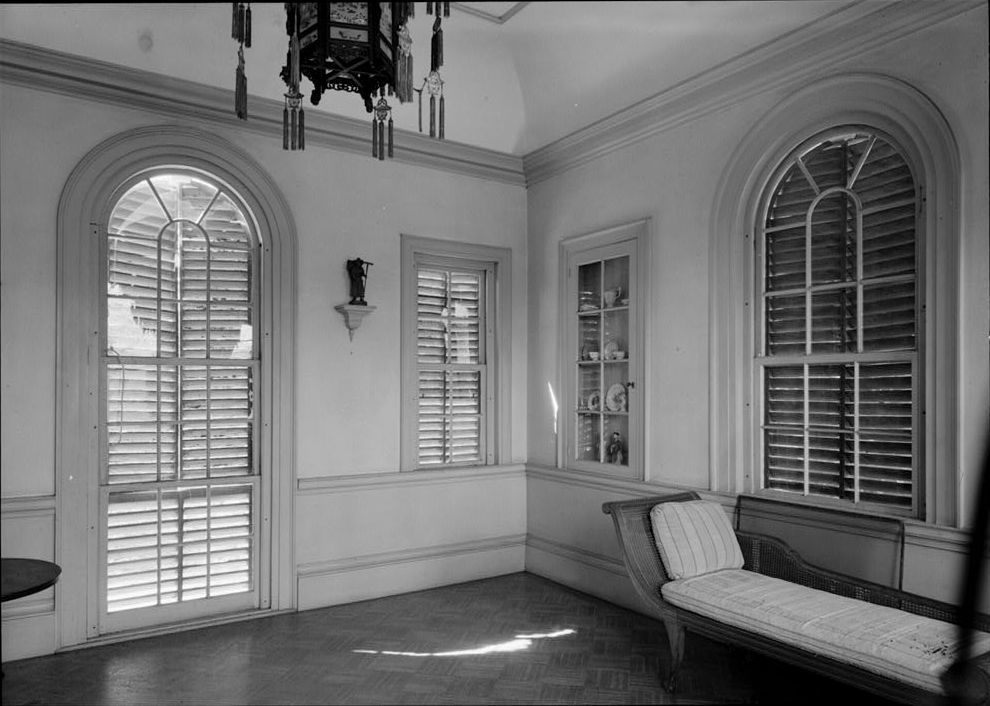
Interior, second floor.

== See also ==
- List of National Historic Landmarks in Massachusetts
- National Register of Historic Places listings in Essex County, Massachusetts
