= Fowler House (Danvers, Massachusetts) =

Historic house in Massachusetts, United States

- U.S. National Register of Historic Places
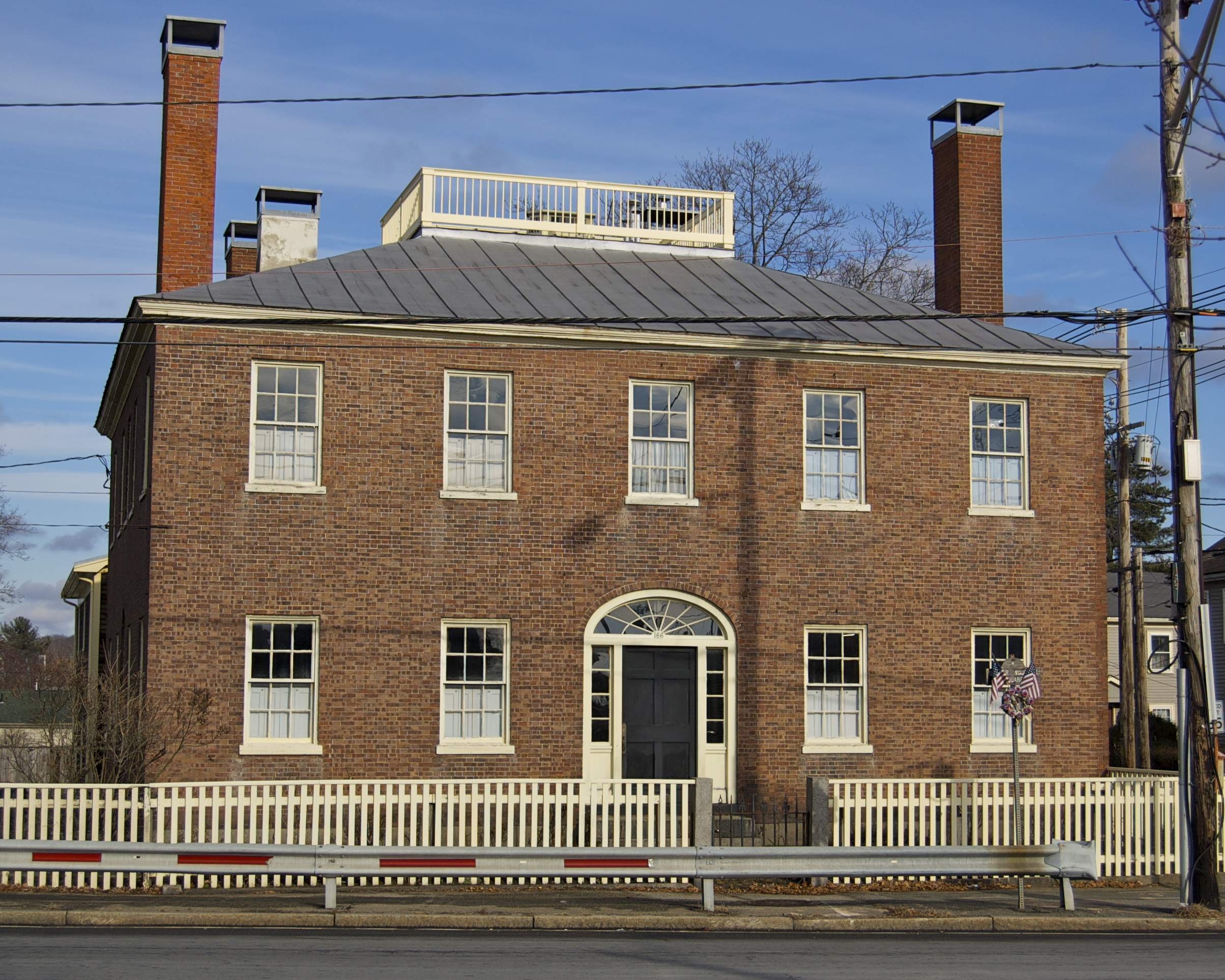
- Fowler House at 166 High Street, Danvers, MA.

- Location within Massachusetts Location within the United States
- Location: Danvers, Massachusetts
- Coordinates: 42°33′22″N 70°55′29″W
- Built: 1810
- Architect: Steven Whipple, Levi Preston
- NRHP reference No.: 74000367
- Added to NRHP: September 17, 1974

The Fowler House is a historic house at 166 High Street in the Danversport section of Danvers, Massachusetts. Built in 1810, the brick 2 1/2-story structure is notable as a well-preserved example of Federal-style architecture in the area, and for its role in the early history of the Society for the Preservation of New England Antiquities (SPNEA, now Historic New England).

The house was built by Levi Preston and Stephen Whipple for Samuel Fowler, Jr., a veteran of the American Revolutionary War and early Danvers industrialist. Analysis of the records of the house construction (archived at the Peabody Essex Museum) shows that it was little changed at the time of its listing on the National Register of Historic Places in 1974.

The house was purchased by SPNEA in 1912, and was its second acquisition after the Swett-Ilsley House in Newbury, Massachusetts. Its relatively plain appearance led to some disagreement within the organization between preservationists seeking to preserve all types of architecture and those seeking to acquire more elegant properties. SPNEA operated the property as a house museum for some time, but sold it into private hands.

== See also ==
- National Register of Historic Places listings in Essex County, Massachusetts
