= Sprague House (Danvers, Massachusetts) =

Historic house in Massachusetts, United States

- U.S. National Register of Historic Places
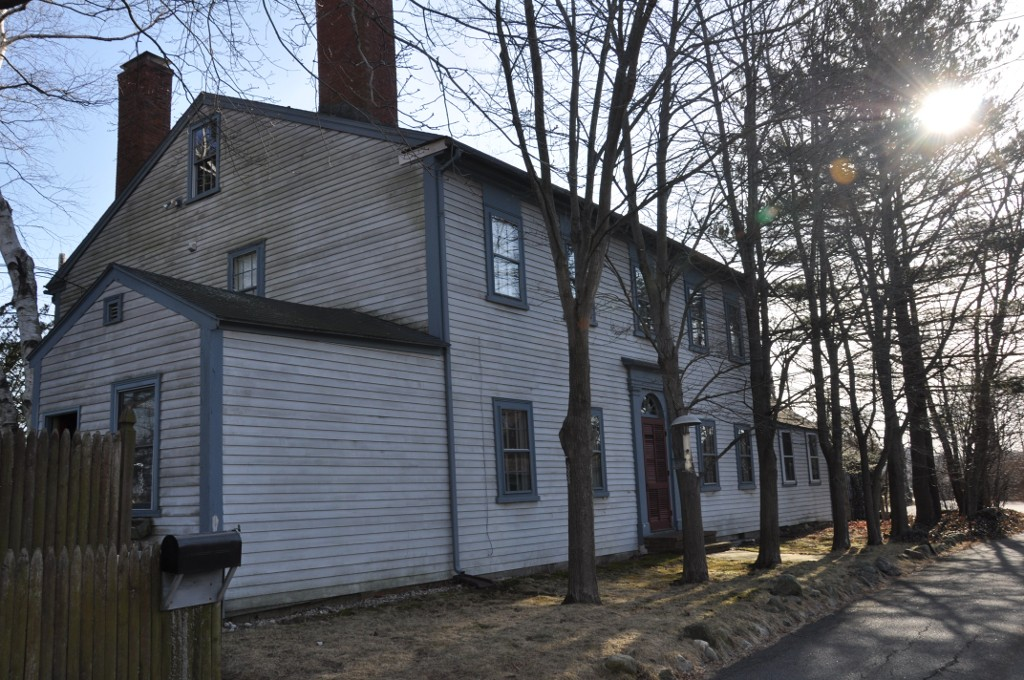

- Location within Massachusetts Location within the United States
- Location: 59 Endicott Street, Danvers, Massachusetts
- Coordinates: 42°33′0″N 70°55′38″W
- Built: 1810
- Architectural style: Federal
- NRHP reference No.: 87001108
- Added to NRHP: July 2, 1987

The Sprague House is a historic house in Danvers, Massachusetts. It is a 2 1/2-story wood-frame structure, five bays wide, with a side-gable roof, end chimneys, and clapboard siding. This well preserved Federal style house was built in 1810 for Joseph Sprague, Jr., son of a wealthy Salem merchant who was also involved in the family business. The house's main Federal feature is its central doorway, which features a semicircular fanlight window and a pedimented overhang supported by pilasters.

The house was listed on the National Register of Historic Places in 1987.

== See also ==
- National Register of Historic Places listings in Essex County, Massachusetts
- List of the oldest buildings in Massachusetts
