= Prince Osborne House =

Historic house in Massachusetts, United States

- U.S. National Register of Historic Places
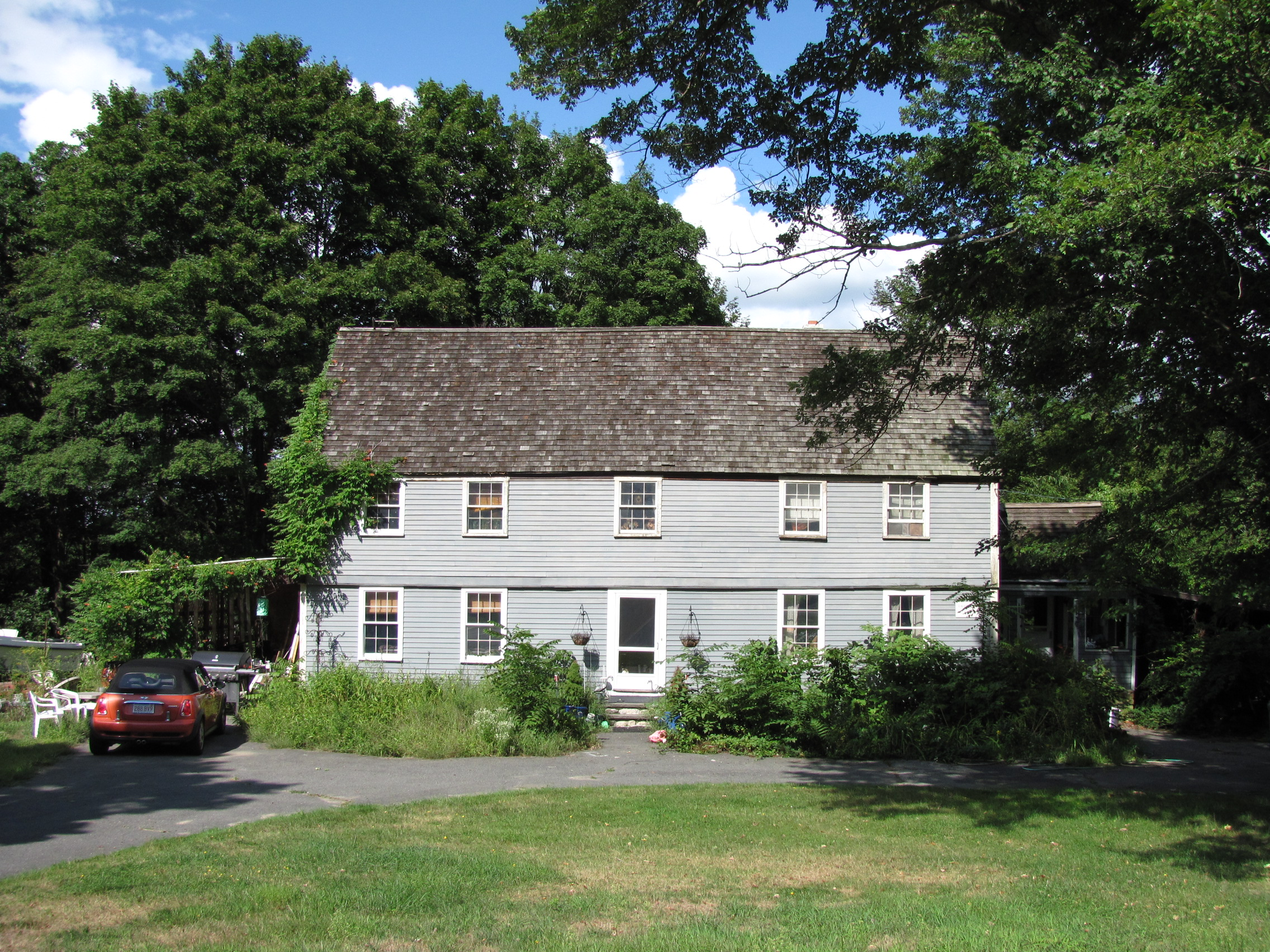
- Prince Osborne House

- Location within Massachusetts Location within the United States
- Location: 273 Maple Street, Danvers, Massachusetts
- Coordinates: 42°34′25″N 70°57′15″W
- Built: 1700
- Architectural style: Colonial
- MPS: First Period Buildings of Eastern Massachusetts TR
- NRHP reference No.: 90000203
- Added to NRHP: March 9, 1990

The Prince Osborne House is a historic First Period house in Danvers, Massachusetts. It is a 2 1/2-story wood-frame structure, five bays wide, with a side-gable roof and clapboard siding. Door and window trim is very simple, and there is a slight overhang of the second floor over the first. The house appears to have been formed out of two separate structures, that were, based on stylistic analysis, joined in about 1720. The left side of the house was probably built sometime between 1690 and 1700, but may be even older. In an unusual twist to this type of joinery, the older portion's chimney was taken down and a new one was apparently built in the framing of the newer section. The interior exhibits primarily later Federal period woodwork, but there are some examples of c. 1720 paneling.

The house was moved to its present location in 1915. Its original location was on a farm owned by Robert Prince, who left the property to his wife Sarah in trust for their children. Sarah remarried, to Alexander Osborne, an indentured servant. She died in prison in 1692 while awaiting trial as a witch during the Salem witch hysteria. The Princes and Osbornes fought a legal battle over the estate, complicating the dating of the house. The older portion of the house appears to have been standing by 1696, when mention is made of it in a partial settlement of the dispute.

The house was added to the National Register of Historic Places in 1990.

== See also ==
- National Register of Historic Places listings in Essex County, Massachusetts
- List of the oldest buildings in Massachusetts
