= Ingersoll's Ordinary =

Building in Danvers, Massachusetts

Coordinates: 42.5650°N 70.9608°W

Ingersoll's Ordinary is a building in Danvers, Massachusetts, United States, formerly known as Salem Village. It was built in 1670 and became a tavern in 1677. During the Salem witch trials, the building was used as a prison for those accused.

== History ==
In the late seventeenth century, the ordinary, an archaic word for tavern, was owned by Deacon Nathaniel Ingersoll. It was the center of life in Salem Village, functioning as an eating and drinking establishment, a community center, and an inn with rented rooms above the tavern.

In 1692 during the Salem witch trials, the first three people accused of witchcraft Tituba, Sarah Good, and Sarah Osborne were imprisoned in the building. The three women were initially going to be examined at the ordinary, but the meetinghouse was used instead due to the large crowds. The building held other examinations of accused witches and testimony was taken there. About 30 people in total were held prisoner in the building during the trials.

Ingersoll owned the residence until his death in 1719. Before the American Revolution, the building was used as the meeting place of the local militia who trained nearby. Extensive repairs which included modernization were made on the house in 1753, and it continued to be operated as a tavern into the 1800s. It was later purchased for a parsonage in 1832, and remained owned by the First Church of Danvers until 1968.

In 2011, the house was bought by an individual from New Hampshire who left it vacant and did not perform maintenance. Some years after the purchase, a 17th-century barn behind the main building collapsed. The main building has developed several issues including a hole in the roof, which has been covered by a tarp for five years and much of exterior has started to rot. In March 2024, the Danvers Ad-Hoc Historic Preservation Study Committee released a report which determined there was nothing in the town's current bylaws to save the structure from demolition by neglect. On May 20, 2024, during the town of Danvers annual town meeting, a "demolition by neglect" bylaw was passed to compel the building owner to make repairs.
