= Danvers, Massachusetts =

- Town
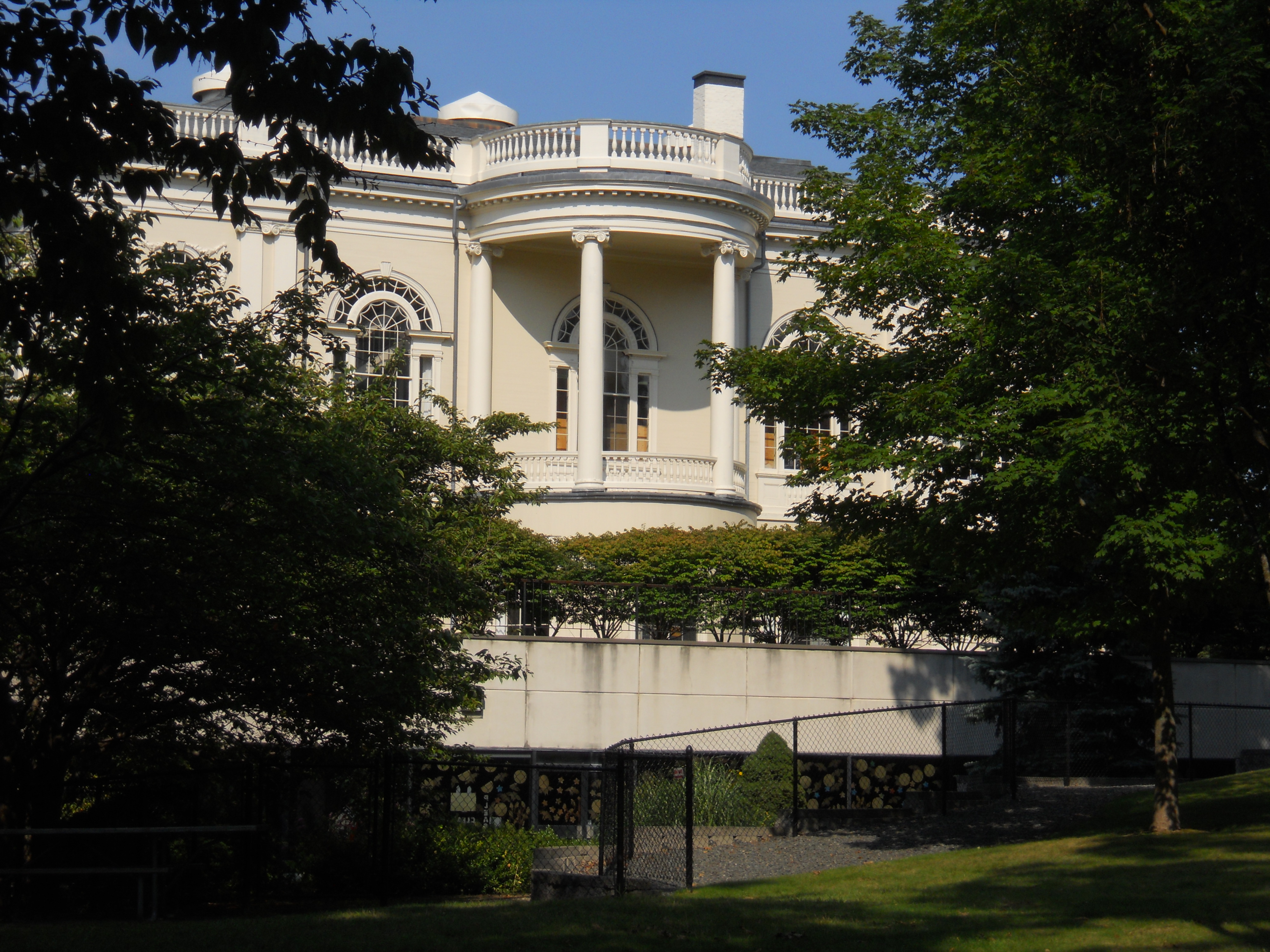
- Peabody Institute Library on Sylvan Street

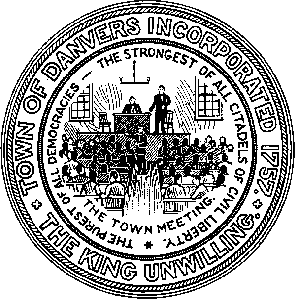
- Seal
- Nickname: Oniontown
- Motto: The King Unwilling
- Location in Essex County and the state of Massachusetts.
- Coordinates: 42°34′30″N 70°55′50″W
- Country: United States
- State: Massachusetts
- County: Essex
- Settled: 1636
- Established as a district: 1752
- Incorporated as a town: 1757
- Named for: Danvers Osborn

Government
  - Type: Representative town meeting
  - Town Manager: Jill Cahill
  - Board of Selectmen: Daniel C. Bennett; Michael Bean; Dutrochet Djoko; Maureen A. Bernard; David A. Mills

Area
  - Total: 14.1 sq mi (36.5 km^{2})
  - Land: 13.3 sq mi (34.4 km^{2})
  - Water: 0.81 sq mi (2.1 km^{2})
- Elevation: 49 ft (15 m)

Population (2020)
  - Total: 28,087
  - Density: 2,114.7/sq mi (816.48/km^{2})
- Time zone: UTC-5 (Eastern)
  - Summer (DST): UTC-4 (Eastern)
- ZIP Codes: 01923 (Danvers); 01937 (Hathorne)
- Area code: 351 / 978
- FIPS code: 25-16250
- GNIS feature ID: 0618295
- Website: www.danversma.gov

Danvers is a town in Essex County, Massachusetts, United States, located on the Danvers River near the northeastern coast of Massachusetts. The suburb is a fairly short ride from Boston and is also in close proximity to the beaches of Gloucester, Ipswich and Revere. Originally known as Salem Village, the village was most widely known for its association with the 1692 Salem witch trials. It was also the site of Danvers State Hospital, one of the state's 19th-century psychiatric hospitals. Danvers is a local center of commerce, hosting many car dealerships and the Liberty Tree Mall. As of the 2020 United States Census, the town's population was 28,087.

== History ==
=== Pre-Columbian era ===
The area was long settled by indigenous cultures of Native Americans. In the historic period, the Massachusett, a tribe of the Algonquian language family, dominated the area.

The land that is now Danvers was once owned by the Naumkeag branch of the Massachusett tribe.

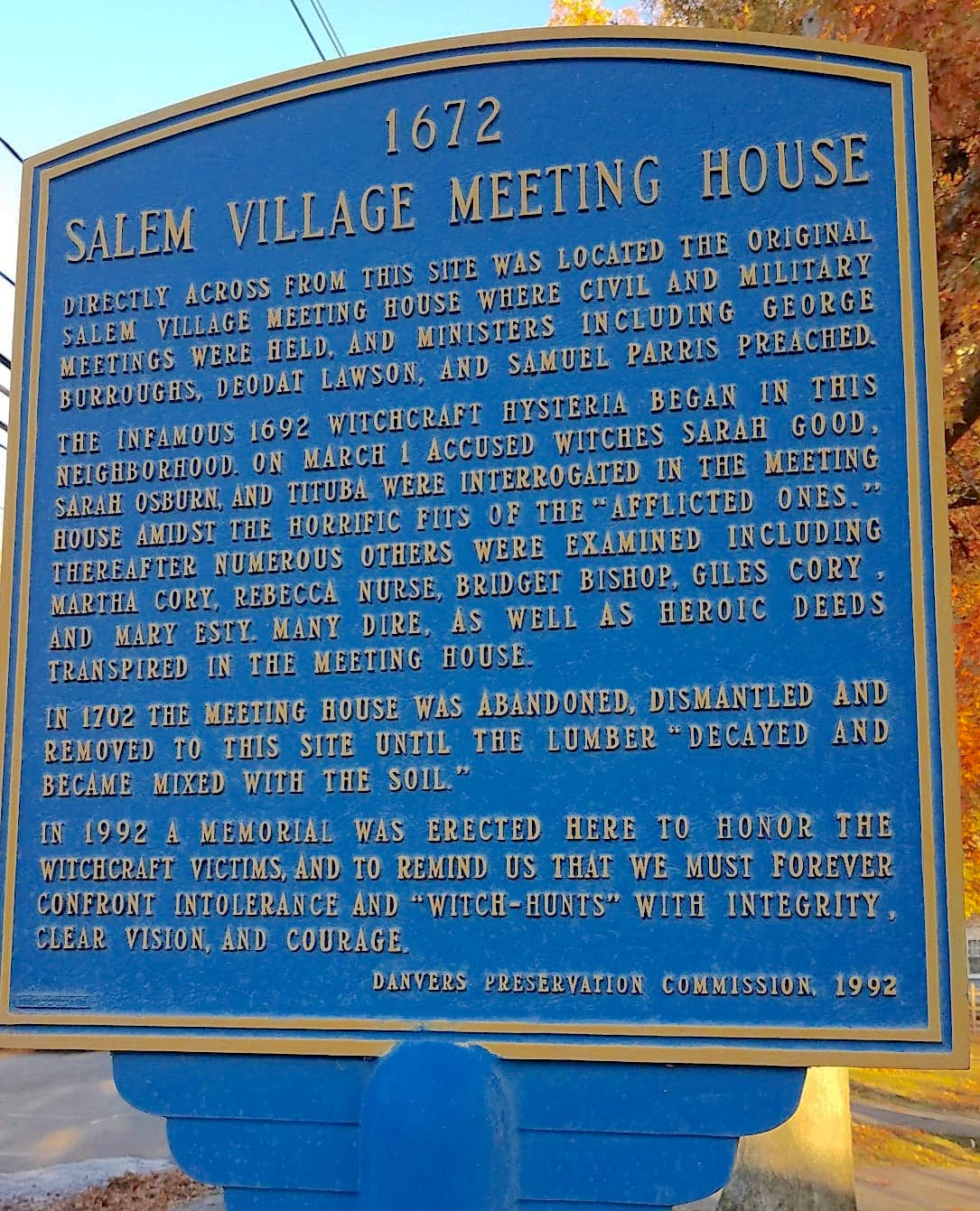
Historical marker, part of the memorial for the victims of the 1692 witchcraft trials, Danvers, Massachusetts

=== 17th century, Salem Village ===
Around 1630, English colonists improved an existing Naumkeag trail as the Old Spanish Road, creating a connection to the main cities of Salem and Boston. Danvers was permanently settled in 1636 as Salem Village. The historical event for which Danvers is best-known is the Salem witch trials of 1692, which began in the home of Rev. Samuel Parris, and spread throughout the region. Resident Rebecca Nurse was convicted in a trial for witchcraft and executed, along with 19 other innocent victims. The Rebecca Nurse Homestead is still standing in Danvers, and can be visited as a historical landmark.

=== 18th century, Danvers ===
The residents of Salem Village petitioned the Massachusetts General Court several times over the following decades to become a town separate from Salem beginning as early as 1733. In 1752, the General Court finally separated Danvers from Salem, but established Danvers as an independent self-governing "district" instead of incorporating it as a town, because of a royal prohibition against creating new towns in Massachusetts. A district had all the rights and powers of a town except the ability to send representatives to the legislature. Following the refusal to admit Danvers to township, 5 out of the 18 Essex County, Massachusetts towns didn't send any representatives and some larger towns like Wenham and Middleton sent only 1 out of their 2 representatives during the 1751-52 meetings of Massachusetts General Court. Danvers was likely named for Danvers Osborn, and 1752 is the date locally commemorated on major anniversaries as the creation of Danvers, despite it not being incorporated yet at that time, because that is when it received its name.

On June 9, 1757, Massachusetts incorporated Danvers as a town regardless of the royal prohibition and, according to legend, King George II later vetoed this act of incorporation and returned it with the message "The King Unwilling". Massachusetts simply ignored this royal veto, which was later included on the town's seal.

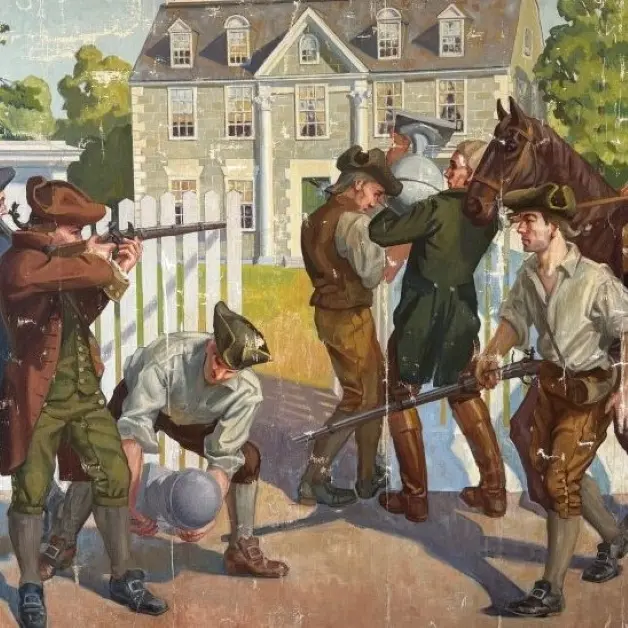
A painting of Danvers during the occupation by Richard Ellory

Danvers was a heavy supporter of the revolution after the refusal by King George II to grant them township. Danvers has been thought to be the home of the first shot of the revolution in recent times, contrary to the typical retelling of the shot heard round the world. On June 2, 1774, after the events of the Boston Tea Party, Governor General Thomas Gage marched to Danvers in an 87-day occupation of the Northeast of Massachusetts. General Gage officially moved the capital of Massachusetts to Salem for the short occupation. The occupation spanned from June 2, 1774, to August 27, 1774. General Gage left Danvers in August as General Benedict Arnold marched a force of 1,100 continental troops from Cambridge to Quebec City into the northeast on the path to his later invasion of Quebec, where the groups then exchanged gunfire.

From the Battle of Lexington even back to the King Phillips War and onward, Danvers residents have participated in the armed forces. Noteworthy Revolutionary figures who stayed in Danvers include Royal Governor General Thomas Gage and Benedict Arnold. Arnold Plaque is found at 1 Conant Street.

In 1776, the Danvers town meeting voted to support the continental congress in the American Revolution, formally expressing their support.

=== 19th century ===
Centennial celebration in Danvers June 16, 185

In 1845, a fire dubbed "The Great Danvers Fire" swept through Danvers Square, destroying 18 buildings. That same year James Fossa purchased the land that would become Fossa Block, which would later become a part of the new Danvers Square downtown area. The block was built in 1915, and many businesses began to operate in the area throughout the following years.

In 1847, the railroad came to Danvers. A street railway was installed in 1884, initially using 69 horse-drawn trolleys. This system was later converted to electricity. The Peabody Institute Library was founded in 1854, it was funded by donations from Danvers residents George Peabody.

The Town Hall was built in 1855. It has been modified and renovated and is still in use. Also in 1855, the southern portion of Danvers broke away to become the town of South Danvers, later renamed Peabody.

In 1878, the Danvers State Hospital opened its doors. This was an institution to provide asylum and treatment for the mentally ill.

Originally an agricultural town, Danvers farmers developed two breeds of vegetables: the Danvers Onion (origin of the "Oniontown" nickname) and the Danvers Half-Long Carrot. This carrot was introduced by "market gardeners" in 1871.

In 1889, The Danvers Historical Society was founded by Reverend Alfred Porter Putnam D.D. Danvers Electric was founded the same year and became the first publicly owned Municipal Light Plant in Massachusetts.

Shoe manufacturing was a prominent industry in the late 19th and early 20th centuries. Successful manufacturing companies included Ideal Baby Shoe. Local shoe companies were undercut in price by factories in other areas and shoe manufacturing moved out.

=== 20th century ===
In 1935, the Danvers branch of the U.S. post office was opened. In 1952, three men looted an unattended United States Trucking Corporation armored money truck in Danvers Square, getting away with $681,000 in cash while leaving behind roughly $100,000 in coin, making it the largest cash larceny in US history at the time.

In 1958, a Nike missile site was built on the Danvers-Topsfield line to protect Boston from Soviet bombers. It was decommissioned in 1974.

Liberty Tree Mall opened in 1972 and was the town's first shopping mall. Around this time, many car dealerships began to open in Danvers, including GMC, Ira, Kia and Honda.

The Danvers State Hospital closed in 1992. The building was converted into an apartment complex in 2008.

=== 21st century ===
In 2007, a CoCo Key Water Resort opened in Danvers. In 2008, it was ordered to close by the state of Massachusetts after families reported chemical burns on their children due to high chloramine levels (fifteen times the allowed limit). In 2012, the CoCo Key underwent a $10,000,000 renovation and a hotel rebrand to the DoubleTree by Hilton-Northshore after a franchise agreement. The water park was kept.

In the 2020s, Danvers has invested in developing several downtown properties.

==== Chemical plant explosion ====
On November 22, 2006, around 2:46 a.m., a major chemical explosion occurred at a facility housing Arnel Company (a manufacturer of industrial-use paint products) and CAI Inc. (a manufacturer of solvents and inks). The blast shook several North Shore towns, knocking homes off foundations and damaging buildings up to half a mile away. Glass windows shattered at least 3 miles (5 km) away, in neighboring Peabody and even in downtown Salem. The explosion was heard and felt up to 45 miles (72 km) away; the concussion was intense.

No one was killed, and none of the injuries were life-threatening, according to Fire Chief Jim Tutko. Approximately 90 homes were damaged. Residents whose homes were damaged or destroyed in the blast were taken to Danvers High School, where the Red Cross established a relief shelter. The blast occurred next to a marina, a bakery/pizza shop, and a gas station, and across the street from Eastern Propane Gas.

A May 13, 2008, report from the U.S. Chemical Safety and Hazard Investigation Board attributed the explosion to unintentional overnight heating of an ink-mixing tank containing flammable solvents.

== Geography ==
According to the United States Census Bureau, Danvers has a total area of 14.1 square miles (37 km^{2}), of which 13.3 square miles (34 km^{2}) is land and 0.8 square miles (2.1 km^{2}), or 5.75%, is water. The tidal Danvers River begins near the southeast corner of town, and is formed by the confluence of the Porter River, Crane River and Waters River. These rivers, in turn, are fed by several brooks. The Ipswich River also flows along the town's western border. The Putnamville Reservoir lies in the north end of the town, which supplies drinking water to the towns of Salem and Beverly.

Though being at sea level in the Danversport area, the town has numerous hills reaching around 130 to 180 feet in elevation, including Dales Hill (located at St. John's Preparatory School), Ferncroft Hill, Folly Hill, Hathorne Hill, Lindall Hill, Nichols Hill, Putnam Hill, Rocky Hill and Whipple Hill (part of Endicott Park).

Danvers has numerous villages dating back to the late 1800s, when the town had a bustling railroad. These include Burley's Corner, Danvers Center, Danversport, Downtown, Ferncroft, Hathorne (which still has its own post office and ZIP code of 01937), Putnamville and Tapleyville.

== Transportation ==
Danvers is located approximately 17 miles (27 km) north of Downtown Boston, nearly halfway between Boston and the New Hampshire state border. It is bordered by Topsfield to the north, Wenham to the northeast, Beverly to the east, a small portion of Salem to the southeast, Peabody to the south and southwest, and Middleton to the northwest. The town center lies 4 miles (6 km) north of Salem, 16 miles (26 km) west of Gloucester, 17 miles (27 km) northeast of Boston, and 19 miles (31 km) southeast of Salem, New Hampshire. Interstate 95 and Massachusetts Route 128 both pass through the town, just east of their junction in Peabody. U.S. Route 1 also passes through town, with a large junction with Interstate 95 in the northwestern end of town. The main highways are also crossed by Route 35, Route 62 and Route 114, with Routes 35 and 62 intersecting just north of the town center. The northern terminus of Route 35 is just over the Topsfield town line, where it meets Route 97.

Several MBTA bus routes pass through the town, between Peabody and Beverly. There is no commuter rail service within town; the Newburyport/Rockport Line of the MBTA Commuter Rail passes through neighboring Salem and Beverly. Passenger rail service was formerly provided by two lines of the Boston & Maine railroad.

Two runways of the Beverly Municipal Airport cross through the town. In the early 1950s, Earle F. Robbins constructed Robbins Airport, a private airfield, on his property on Collins Street extending to Prince Street. The airport closed in the 1980s and was demolished in the 1990s. The nearest regularly scheduled commercial flights are located at Boston's Logan International Airport. In August 2024, the Logan Express bus service began operating at the Liberty Tree Mall in Danvers. This was a relocation from the Northshore Mall in Peabody.

== Demographics ==
Historical population
Year	Pop.	±%
1790	2,425	—
1850	8,109	+234.4%
1860	5,110	−37.0%
1870	5,600	+9.6%
1880	6,598	+17.8%
1890	7,454	+13.0%
1900	8,542	+14.6%
1910	9,407	+10.1%
1920	11,108	+18.1%
1930	12,957	+16.6%
1940	14,179	+9.4%
1950	15,720	+10.9%
1960	21,926	+39.5%
1970	26,151	+19.3%
1980	24,100	−7.8%
1990	24,174	+0.3%
2000	25,212	+4.3%
2010	26,493	+5.1%
2020	28,087	+6.0%
2024*	28,590	+1.8%
* = population estimate. Source: United States census records and Population Estimates Program data.

As of the census of 2000, there were 25,212 people, 9,555 households, and 6,564 families residing in the town. The population density was 1,898.5 inhabitants per square mile (733.0/km^{2}). There were 9,762 housing units at an average density of 735.1 per square mile (283.8/km^{2}). The racial makeup of the town was 97.72% White, 0.35% Black or African American, 0.10% Native American, 1.11% Asian, 0.02% Pacific Islander, 0.22% from other races, and 0.48% from two or more races. Hispanic or Latino of any race were 0.83% of the population.

There were 9,555 households, out of which 30.9% had children under the age of 18 living with them, 56.2% were married couples living together, 9.4% had a female householder with no husband present, and 31.3% were non-families. 26.6% of all households were made up of individuals, and 10.8% had someone living alone who was 65 years of age or older. The average household size was 2.53 and the average family size was 3.11.

In the town, the population was spread out, with 23.2% under the age of 18, 6.4% from 18 to 24, 28.7% from 25 to 44, 24.5% from 45 to 64, and 17.2% who were 65 years of age or older. The median age was 40 years. For every 100 females, there were 86.9 males. For every 100 females age 18 and over, there were 84.2 males.

The median income for a household in the town was $58,779, and the median income for a family was $70,565. Males had a median income of $48,058 versus $33,825 for females. The per capita income for the town was $26,852. About 1.7% of families and 2.9% of the population were below the poverty line, including 3.0% of those under age 18 and 4.4% of those age 65 or over.

== Government ==
=== Local ===
Danvers has a Plan E form of government, which is a combination of a representative town meeting and town manager. It also has an elected board of selectmen. The town meeting group is made up of 149 elected residents who meet once a year to vote on matters related to the town. The town meeting members are chosen by voters in each precinct and serve three-year terms. The town is divided into eight precincts, each represented by eighteen members. Six seats are elected or renewed annually, while the five selectmen also hold seats as town meeting members. Town meetings are presided over by the Town Moderator, who is elected to a one-year term and has complete authority over all matters of rules.

The town also has various other committees and commissions made up of residents to help manage town operations some of these include the School Committee, Historic District Commission, Zoning Board of Appeals and Agriculture Commission. These positions are determined by either local elections or appointment by the respective committees.

=== State ===
Danvers is represented in the state legislature by officials elected from the following districts:

- Massachusetts Senate's 2nd Essex district
- Massachusetts House of Representatives' 13th Essex district

== Media ==
=== Newspapers ===
The town's first newspaper, the Danvers Courier, was established in 1845.

In the past, Danvers was served by the Danvers Herald. The newspaper eventually came under the ownership of Gannett, which merged it with the Beverly Citizen in 2019. The new Herald Citizen no longer produces any Danvers-specific news, instead reprinting stories from other Gannett-owned papers.

Danvers is covered by The Salem News, which is based in Danvers (despite being named for neighboring Salem) and covers several communities in the area.

=== Danvers Community Access Television ===
Danvers Community Access Television (DCAT), founded in 2001, is the public-access television station for Danvers, providing public, educational, and government access television programming along with live programming of Danvers High School sporting events.

== Economy ==
=== Top employers ===
According to the town's 2024 Annual Comprehensive Financial Report, the top ten employers in the town are:

#	Employer	# of employees
1	Medtronic Interventional Vascular	955
2	North Shore Community College	789
3	Hospice Care Dimensions	675
4	Market Basket	505
5	Cell Signaling Technology	480
6	Abiomed	400
7	Essex Technical High School	375
8	IRA Motor Group	324
9	The Home Depot	301
10	Partners Healthcare	300

Danvers has seen major growth in the food truck revolution: and this has led to some of the food truck owners moving toward more permanent cafes.

=== Public safety ===
Danvers has full-time police and fire departments. The towns first Fire department began operating in 1800, with two hand-operated pumpers. The current Danvers Fire Department has been active in the town since the early 1920s, In 1962, the Danvers Fire District was formed with taxes being collected to fund the volunteer service. The station responds to around 100 calls per year, with a majority of those being in response to motor vehicle accidents rather than structural fires. The Danvers Police Department dates back to 1752, when four residents were elected to an office of Constable during the first town meeting to offer protection to the citizens. In late 1800s residents of Danvers started a petition for more protection leading to the towns first police chief George Kimball being elected in 1879. In 1976, a referendum vote was held which seen 70 percent of the voters in Danvers support building a new and larger facility to serve as the police headquarters replacing the previous headquarters built in 1951. The owners of the Liberty Tree Mall donated 1.8 acres near the Mall to the town and construction was finished in 1977, where the police headquarters still remains. The police department was accredited in 1986. Danvers was the first municipal agency within the Commonwealth of Massachusetts to become nationally accredited.

Emergency medical services are provided by Atlantic Ambulance (a Division of Cataldo Ambulance), a large private ambulance company based in Somerville. The Town was previously served by Lyons Ambulance Service, a small private ambulance company, which had served the town since 1904 before being bought by Cataldo Ambulance in 2017.

==== 1990 gas leaks and explosions ====
On April 2, 1990, the natural gas lines serving homes were accidentally over-pressurized by a Boston Gas worker, resulting in fires and explosions along Lafayette St., Maple St., Venice St. and Beaver Park Av. which injured six people.

=== Utilities ===
The Danvers Public Works (DPW) oversee all of the town buildings, public infrastructure, refuse collection, and public trees. They are also responsible for the town’s weekly trash and recycling collection.

== Education ==
=== Public schools ===
The town of Danvers comprises its own school district, Danvers Public Schools. The district has five elementary schools (Highlands Elementary, Riverside Elementary, Great Oak Elementary, Thorpe Elementary, and Smith Elementary), each serving kindergarten through fifth grade (Riverside, Thorpe, and Great Oak also includes pre-kindergarten.) Grades six through eight attend the Holten-Richmond Middle School. Grades nine through twelve attend Danvers High School.

Danvers competes in Little League Baseball as part of two local leagues; the Danvers National Little League (DNLL) on the south and west side of town, and the Danvers American Little League (DALL) on the north and east side of town. Kids in the DNLL primarily go to Highlands and Great Oak Elementary Schools, while kids in DALL primarily go to Smith and Thorpe Elementary Schools. Riverside Elementary is split between the two.

=== Private schools ===
Danvers is home to three private schools. St. Mary of the Annunciation School serves pre-kindergarten through eighth grade. Plumfield Academy is a small school for grades one through eight, with a philosophy of education based on that of Charlotte Mason. St. John's Preparatory School is a school for young men, serving grades six through twelve. St. Mary's and St. John's are religiously affiliated. St. Mary's is part of the Archdiocese of Boston and Saint John's or commonly known as "the Prep" is a Xaverian Brothers-sponsored school.

=== Vocational schools ===
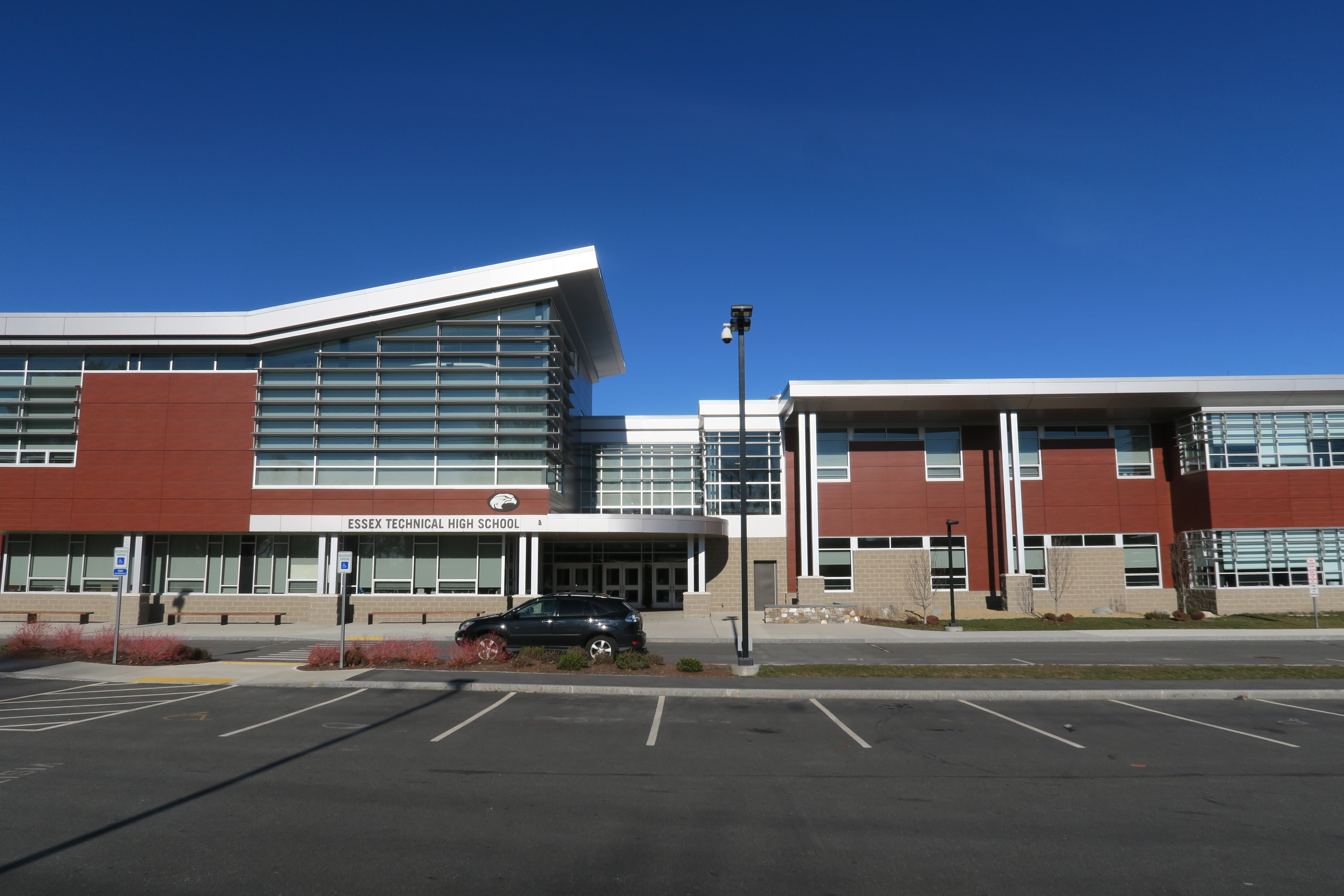
The Essex Agricultural High School

In addition to the public and private schools, Danvers once hosted Essex Agricultural High School, an independent, state-funded day school serving grades 9 through 12. Essex Agricultural High School has merged with North Shore Tech, which was located in Middleton, which has resulted in a larger, unified campus located in Danvers.

Essex North Shore Agricultural and Technical School opened in September 2014. The school offers 24 technical and agricultural programs to students from in-district towns, and offers the seven agricultural programs to out-of-district students.

=== Colleges ===
North Shore Community College opened in 1965 and has two campuses. The main campus is in Danvers, and a second, smaller campus is located in nearby Lynn.

== Arts and culture ==
Danvers holds various annual community events throughout the year, including their Memorial Day Parade along with a reading of the United States Declaration of Independence on July 4. In 2022, Danvers FalconFest was founded which host various events such as firework shows and the towns Christmas Tree lighting. In addition concerts are regularly held outside of the Peabody Institute Library,

=== Points of interest ===
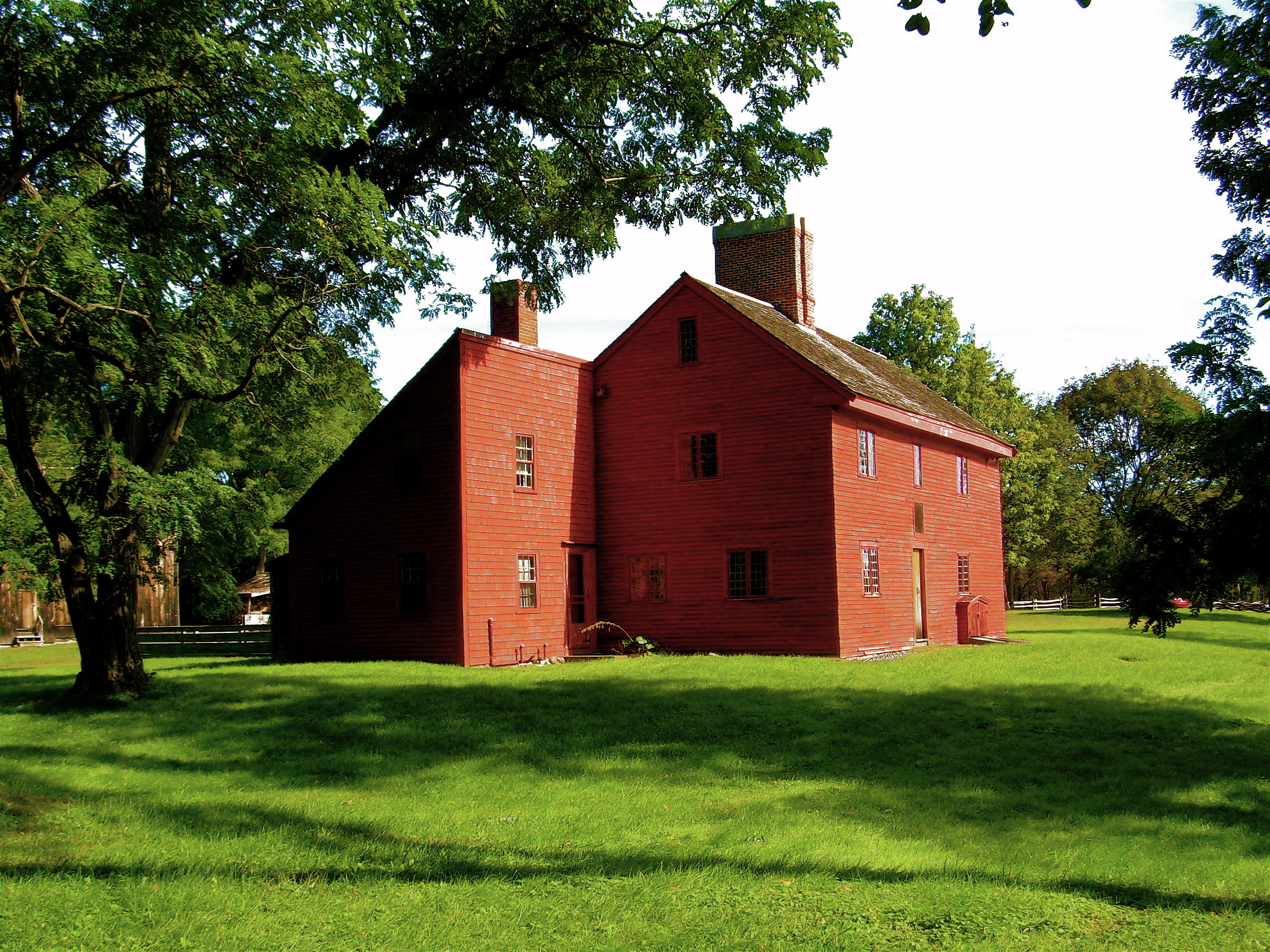
Rebecca Nurse Homestead Danvers, Massachusetts

- Danvers State Hospital
- Derby Summer House, on the grounds of the Glen Magna Farms
- Endicott Park
- Endicott Pear Tree, perhaps the oldest living fruit tree in North America
- Fowler House
- Fox Hill School
- Glen Magna Farms
- High Street Cemetery
- James Putnam Jr. House
- Judge Samuel Holten House
- Liberty Tree Mall
- Peabody Institute
- Prince Osborne House
- Rea-Proctor Homestead
- Rea Putnam Fowler House
- Rebecca Nurse Homestead
- General Israel Putnam House
- Salem Village Historic District
- Sprague House
- Ingersoll's Ordinary, former colonial tavern and site of many events during the Salem Village Witchcraft Delusion
- White-Preston House

=== Film and television ===
Movies and TV shows filmed in Danvers, Massachusetts include:

- Widow’s Bay (2026)
- Defending Jacob (2020)
- Hubie Halloween (2020)
- Sound of Metal (2019)
- Ted 2 (2015)
- The Heat (2013)
- Crooked Arrows (2012)
- Knight and Day (2010)
- The House of Usher (2006)
- Session 9 (2001)
- The Good Son (1993)
- Home Before Dark (1958)

== Notable people ==
=== Athletes ===
- David Bavaro, NFL linebacker
- Mark Bavaro, NFL tight end
- Maggie Connor, Olympian, skiing
- Meghan Duggan, Olympian, hockey
- Shane Smith, MLB pitcher Chicago White Sox
- Sally Pechinsky, Olympian, fencer, born in Danvers
- Jenny Thompson, Olympian, swimming
- Steve Lombardozzi, MLB second baseman for the Minnesota Twins and Houston Astros

=== Creative arts ===
- Brad Delp, lead singer of the band Boston
- Matt Farley, musician, creator of Motern Media
- Francis Sumner Merritt (1913–2000), painter, co-founder and first director of Haystack Mountain School of Crafts
- Nick Di Paolo, comedian, actor, podcaster

=== Writers ===
- Harriet Putnam Fowler (1842–1901), writer
- Eliza Putnam Heaton, journalist, writer, editor

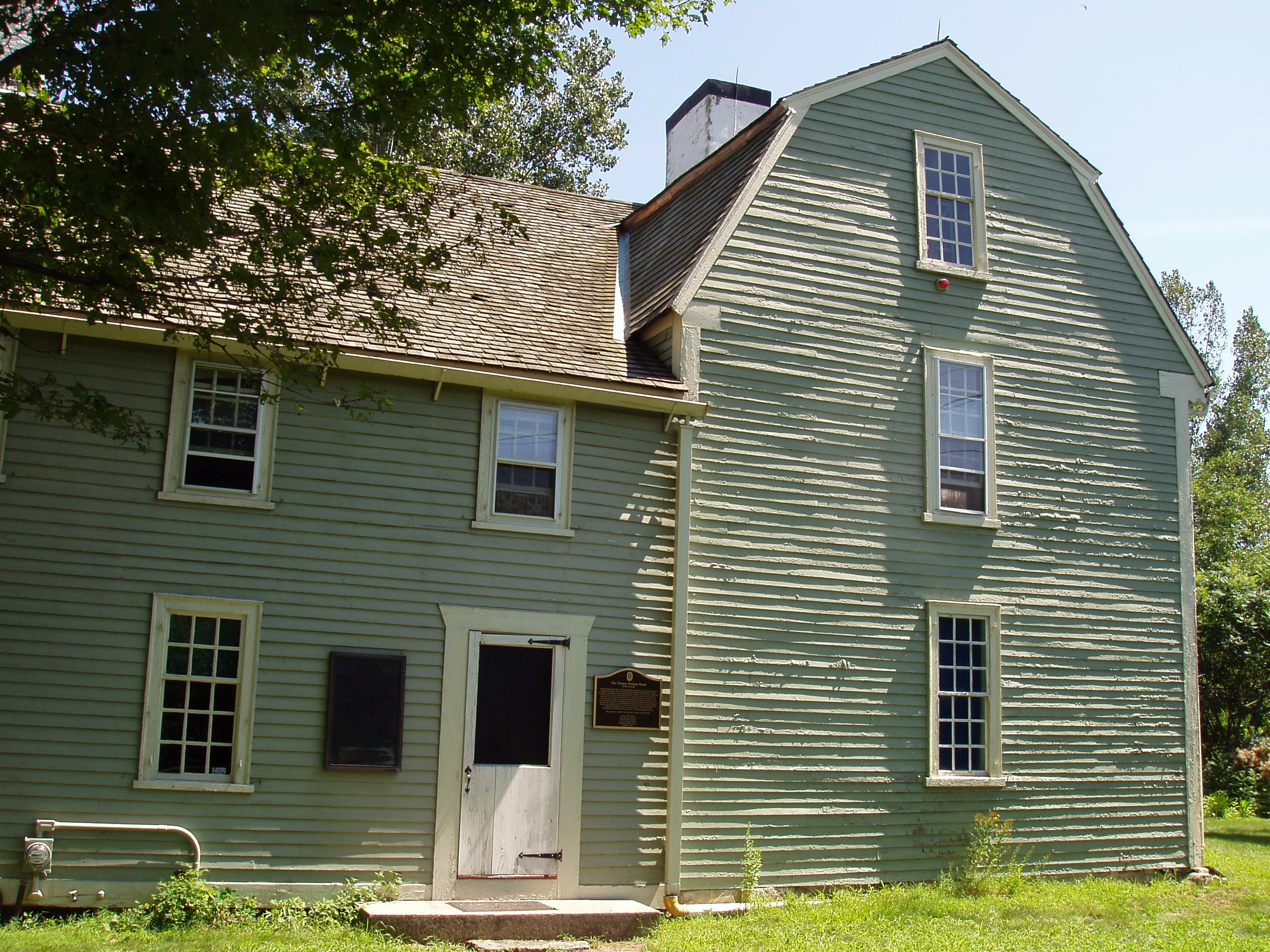
General Israel Putnam House

=== Military ===
- Grenville M. Dodge
- Israel Putnam

=== Politicians and business ===
- Quan Barry, author, poet
- Samuel Holten, president of the Continental Congress
- John Marsh, early California pioneer and businessman
- Rebecca Nurse, executed as part of the Salem Witch Trials
- Samuel Parris, minister of the Salem Village Church during the Salem Witch Trials
- George Peabody financier and philanthropist
