= White-Preston House =

Historic house in Massachusetts, United States

- U.S. National Register of Historic Places
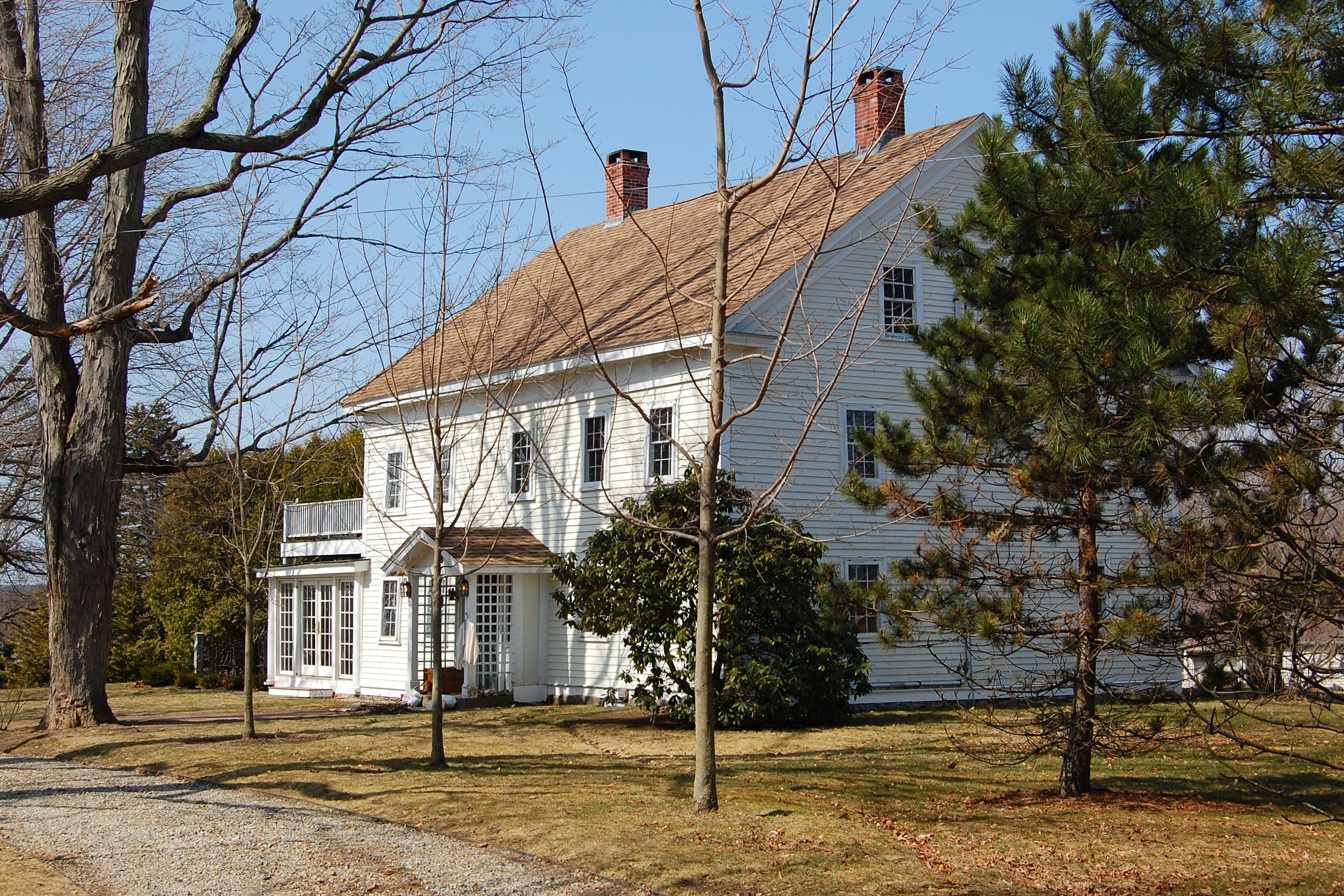
- White Preston House on Maple Street

- Location within Massachusetts Location within the United States
- Location: 592 Maple Street, Danvers, Massachusetts
- Coordinates: 42°35′28″N 70°58′50″W
- Built: 1722
- Architectural style: Colonial
- MPS: First Period Buildings of Eastern Massachusetts TR
- NRHP reference No.: 90000204
- Added to NRHP: March 9, 1990

The White-Preston House is a historic First Period house in Danvers, Massachusetts. It is a 2 1/2-story wood-frame structure, five bays wide, with a side-gable roof, twin interior chimneys, and clapboard siding. Its main entrance is sheltered by a gable-roofed portico. The oldest portion of the house, its front right, dates to about 1722, with the front rooms on the left added soon afterward. In the 19th century the rear of the house was either rebuilt or enlarged to be a full two stories in height, and the house was given a modest Greek Revival stylistic treatment.

The house was listed on the National Register of Historic Places in 1990.

== See also ==
- National Register of Historic Places listings in Essex County, Massachusetts
- List of the oldest buildings in Massachusetts
