= Fox Hill School =

- U.S. National Register of Historic Places
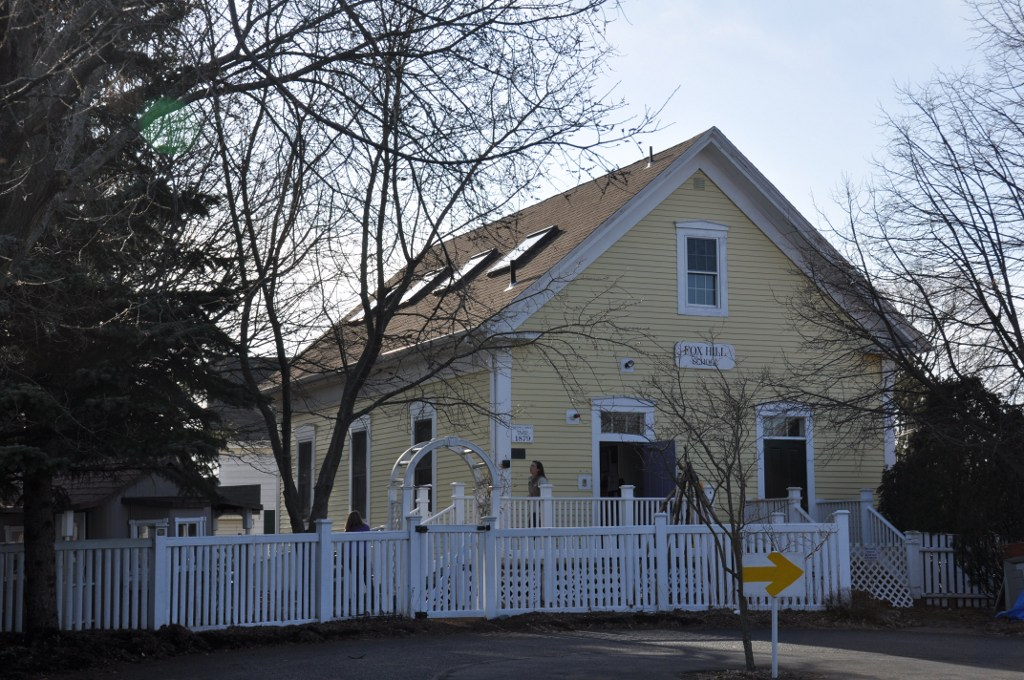

- Location within Massachusetts Location within the United States
- Location: 81 Water St., Danvers, Massachusetts
- Coordinates: 42°33′1″N 70°55′24″W
- Built: 1879
- Architect: Russell, George
- Architectural style: Greek Revival
- NRHP reference No.: 87002554
- Added to NRHP: February 10, 1988

The Fox Hill School is a historic school building at 81 Water Street in Danvers, Massachusetts, USA. Built in 1879 and in use as a school until the 1970s, it is one of two surviving one-room schoolhouses in the town. It now houses a preschool. The building was listed on the National Register of Historic Places in 1988.

== Description and history ==
The Fox Hill School stands in eastern Danvers, at the southwest corner of Water and Endicott Streets. It is a single-story wood frame structure, with a gabled roof and clapboarded exterior. Its main facade faces toward Water Street and the Crane River just beyond. It is symmetrical, with a pair of entrance on the main floor and a sash window in the gable above. The doorways are set in surrounds with pilasters, transom windows, and a slightly gabled pediment; the latter detail is repeated in the window surrounds. The building corners are also pilastered, with entablatures running along the side walls.

The town purchased the land for the school (then about 2 acres (0.81 ha)) in 1875, and appropriated $1,000 to have the school built four years later. It was built by George Russel, a local carpenter, for $795. It was used as a school into the 1970s, and was being used by the town for storage when surveyed in 1981. It has since been rehabilitated and adapted for use as a private preschool and kindergarten.

== See also ==
- National Register of Historic Places listings in Essex County, Massachusetts
