= Rea-Proctor Homestead =

Historic house in Massachusetts, United States

- U.S. National Register of Historic Places
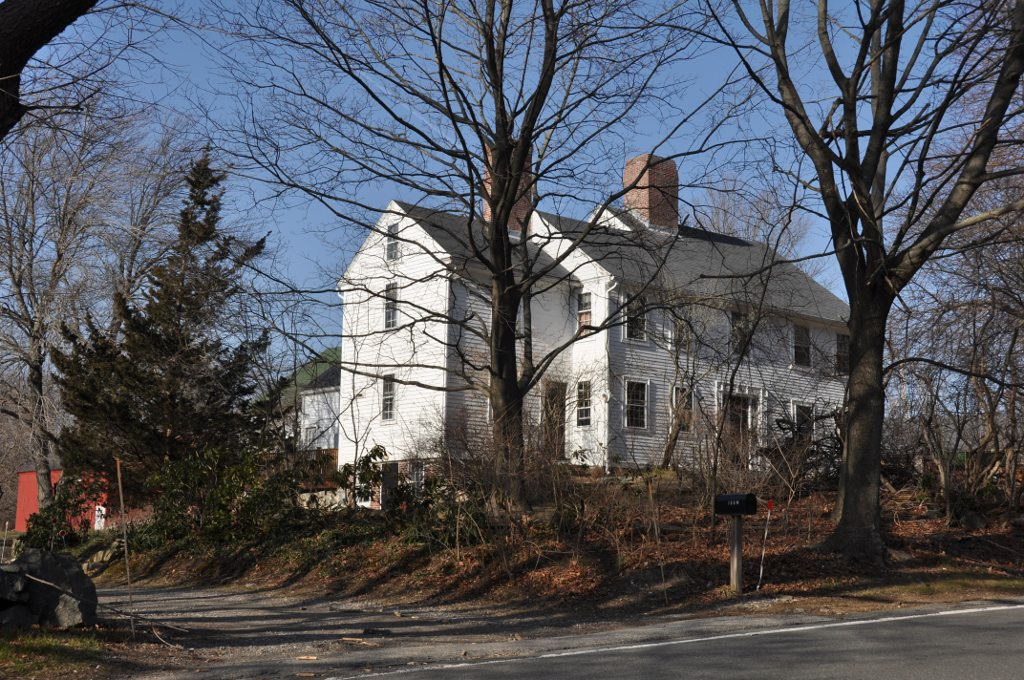

- Location within Massachusetts Location within the United States
- Location: Danvers, Massachusetts
- Coordinates: 42°34′13″N 70°54′53″W
- Built: 1692
- NRHP reference No.: 82001915
- Added to NRHP: June 2, 1982

The Rea-Proctor Homestead is a historic First Period house at 180 Conant Street in Danvers, Massachusetts. It is notable not only for its age, but its association with a number of well-known individuals. The oldest part of the house was built c. 1692 by Joshua Rea Sr., whose son, Joshua Jr., testified at the Salem witch trials on behalf of John Proctor. It remained in the Rea family until 1803, and from 1804 to 1806 it was owned by one of Massachusetts's leading statesmen, Timothy Pickering. The house was updated to a Federalist style by Isaac Rea, the last of that family to own the property. Pickering was a gentleman farmer, running agricultural experiments on the farm and taking detailed notes of his work. He helped found the Essex Agricultural Society, the first organization of its type. In 1812 the property was purchased by Daniel Proctor, and it has since remained in the hands of his descendants.

The house was added to the National Register of Historic Places in 1982.

== See also ==
- National Register of Historic Places listings in Essex County, Massachusetts
- List of the oldest buildings in Massachusetts
