= Peabody Institute (Danvers, Massachusetts) =

- U.S. National Register of Historic Places
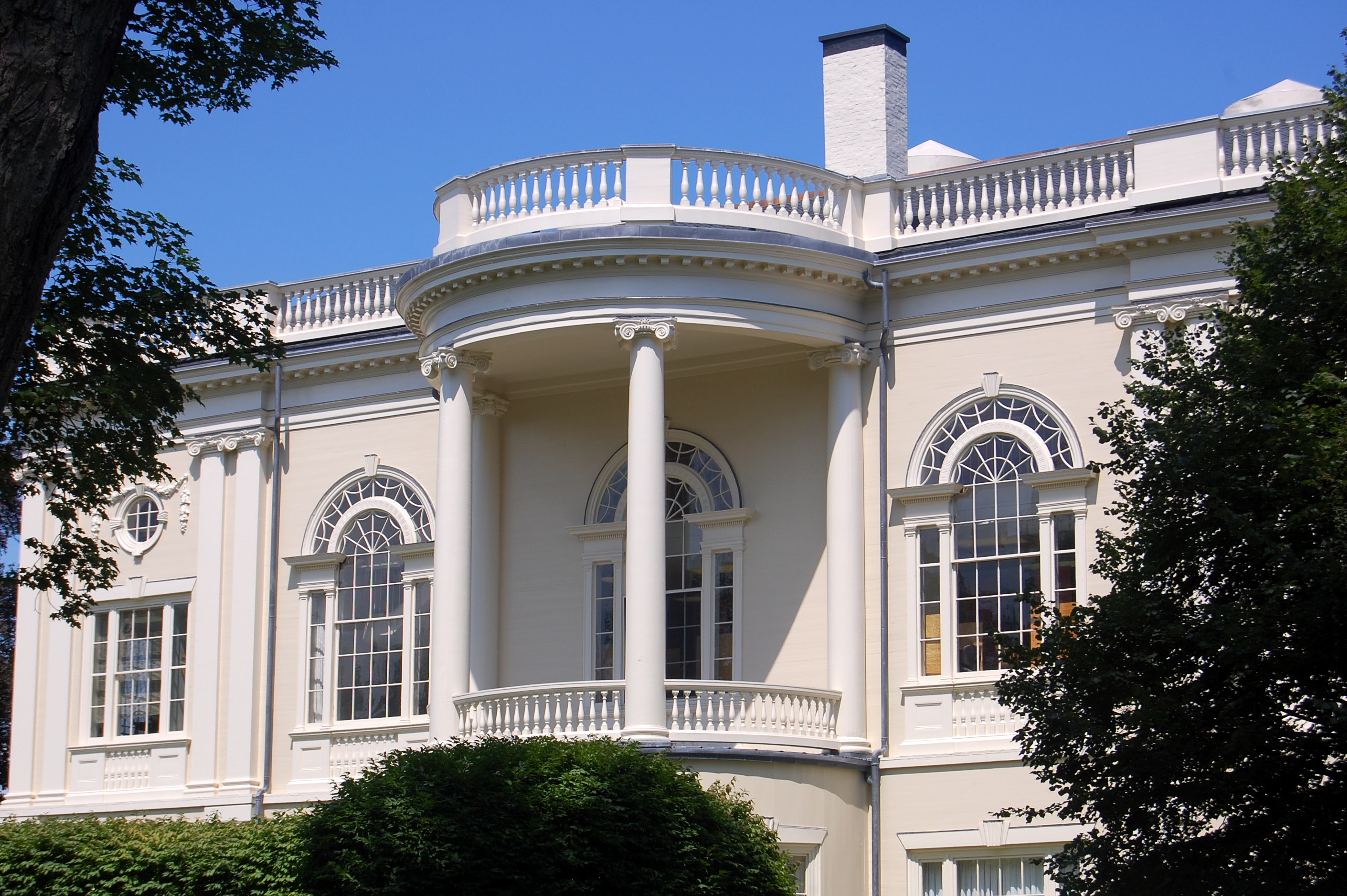
- Front facade of the library
- Location: Danvers, Massachusetts
- Coordinates: 42°33′41″N 70°56′30″W
- Area: 4.38 acres (1.77 ha)
- Built: 1891
- Architect: Little & Browne; Silvester, Joshua
- Architectural style: Classical Revival
- NRHP reference No.: 97001559
- Added to NRHP: December 22, 1997

The Peabody Institute Library is the public library of Danvers, Massachusetts, established in 1854. The current building at 15 Sylvan Street was constructed for the Peabody Institute in 1891 by Little & Browne. The historic structure was added to the National Register of Historic Places in 1997.

== Architecture and history ==
Philanthropist and native son George Peabody donated $50,000 for the construction of a library for Danvers, after previously endowing the Peabody Institute in South Danvers (now Peabody). The first building was designed by Gridley J. F. Bryant and built in 1868–69; this Gothic Revival structure was destroyed by fire in 1890. The library's trustees elected to rebuild on the same site, retaining Little & Browne (whose chief draftsman was a Danvers resident) to design the replacement. The present Classical Revival structure was completed in 1892. The building was transferred from the trustees to the town in 1978.

The library is located in a residential area south of the Danvers central business district. It is set in a park of over 4 acres (1.6 ha) on a low knoll. It is a two-story wood-frame building, whose exterior is flushboarding treated to look like masonry. It has a low-pitch gabled roof, which is surrounded by a low balustrade, and is set on a granite foundation. Its main facade faces north, and is distinguished by a semicircular portico projecting over the center of five bays, supported by smooth Doric columns. This portico shelters the main entrance, which is flanked by sidelight windows and topped by a round arch. The round arch is repeated in the immediately flanking bays over sash windows. A semicircular portico is also located on the south side, but has no entrance. The interior of the building originally included an auditorium space on the upper level, but has been altered and now houses only library facilities. This auditorium was used for many years for a variety of functions, including lectures and high school graduation ceremonies. The building interior was extensively altered and expanded in 1981, including the addition of the Danvers Archival Center, with only minimal impact to the exterior.

== Finance ==
In fiscal year 2008, the town of Danvers spent 1.54% ($1,087,991) of its budget on its public library—some $40 per person.

== See also ==
- National Register of Historic Places listings in Essex County, Massachusetts
