= Glen Magna Farms =

Historic country estate in Danvers, Massachusetts

Coordinates: 42°34′25.14″N 70°58′03.10″W

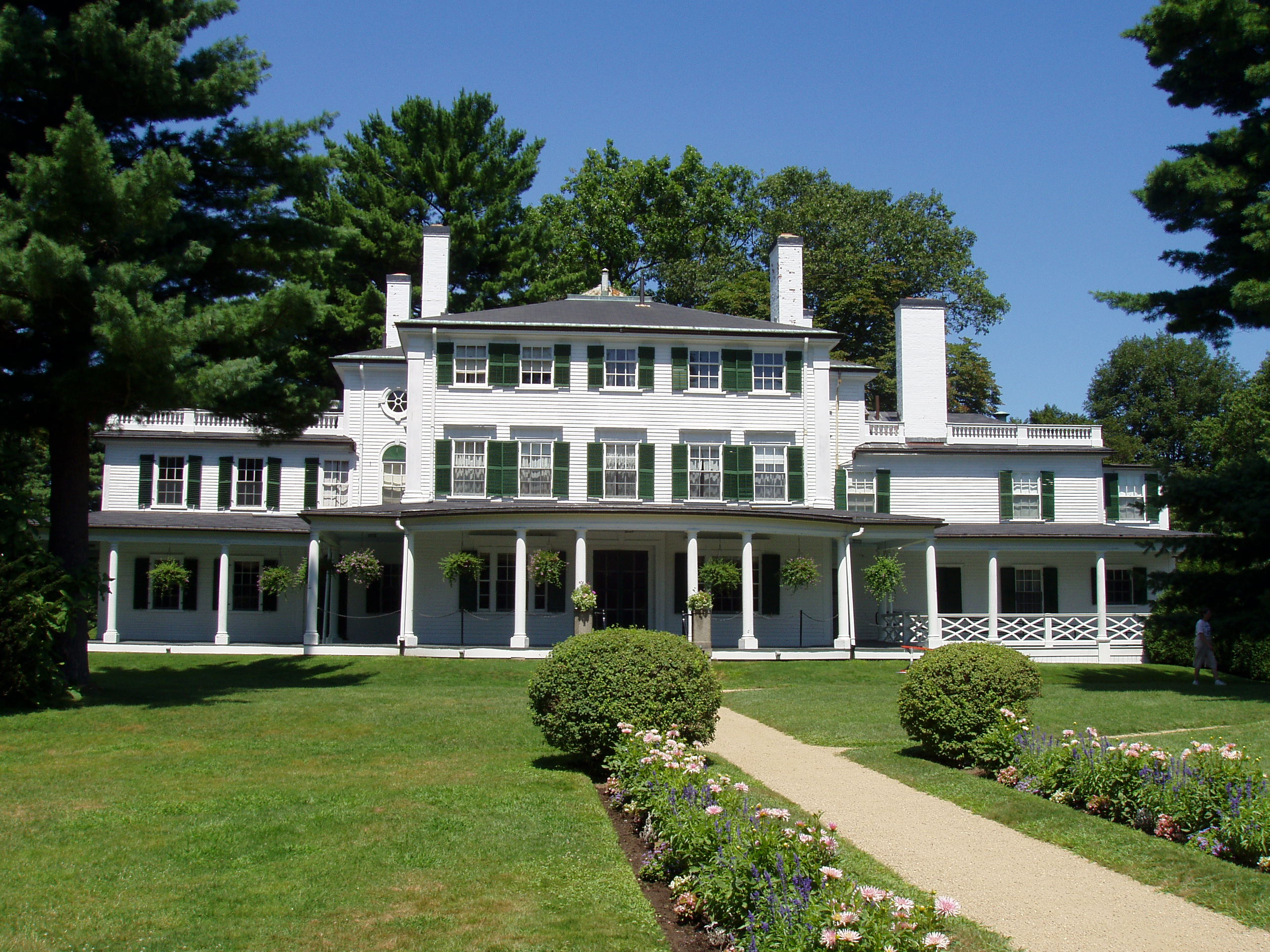
Glen Magna Farms, main house.

Glen Magna Farms (4.5 ha / 11 acres) is a historic country estate located at the end of Ingersoll Street, Danvers, Massachusetts. It is currently owned by the Danvers Historical Society and open daily. An admission donation is suggested. Guided tours of the house and gardens are offered from May to July and includes a box lunch.

The estate began during the War of 1812 when Joseph Peabody, a leading Salem merchant, bought a 20-acre (81,000 m^{2}) property with house. With additional purchases, the estate eventually grew to 330 acres (1.3 km^{2}). In 1893, Ellen Peabody Endicott, his granddaughter, hired the Boston architecture firm of Little, Browne & Moore to expand the house to its current form. In 1926 she was awarded the Massachusetts Horticultural Society's Hunnewell Gold Medal for the estate's plantings. Her son, William Crowninshield Endicott, Jr., continued to improve the grounds, most notably in 1901 by moving the Derby Summer House (built 1794 to designs by Samuel McIntire) to the property. In 1963 the Danvers Historical Society purchased the central 11 acres (45,000 m^{2}) of the property for restoration and preservation. Much of the remainder of the estate, some 165 acres (0.67 km^{2}), is now the public Endicott Park.

Today the grounds are open to the public for viewing and special events. Key features of the grounds include the striking Derby Summer House with its enclosed rose garden designed by Herbert Browne; Cushing pergola with wisteria; flower garden with small fountain and geraniums, peonies, lilies, hostas, and roses; old fashioned central garden; shrubbery garden of rhododendrons, hemlocks, forsythia, azaleas, fringe tree, dogwood, and weeping beech; and a carriage road and miscellaneous statuary.

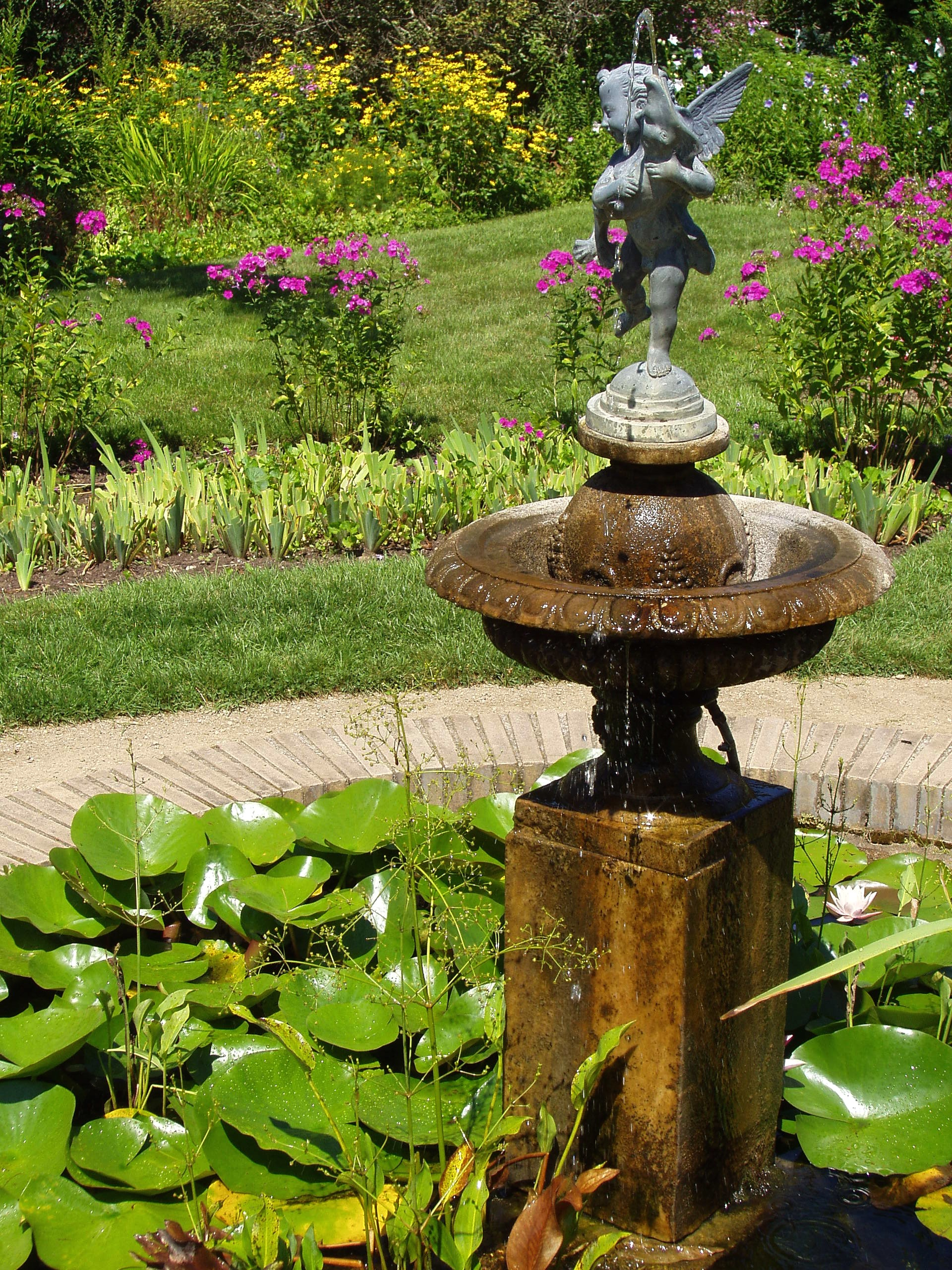
Garden fountain

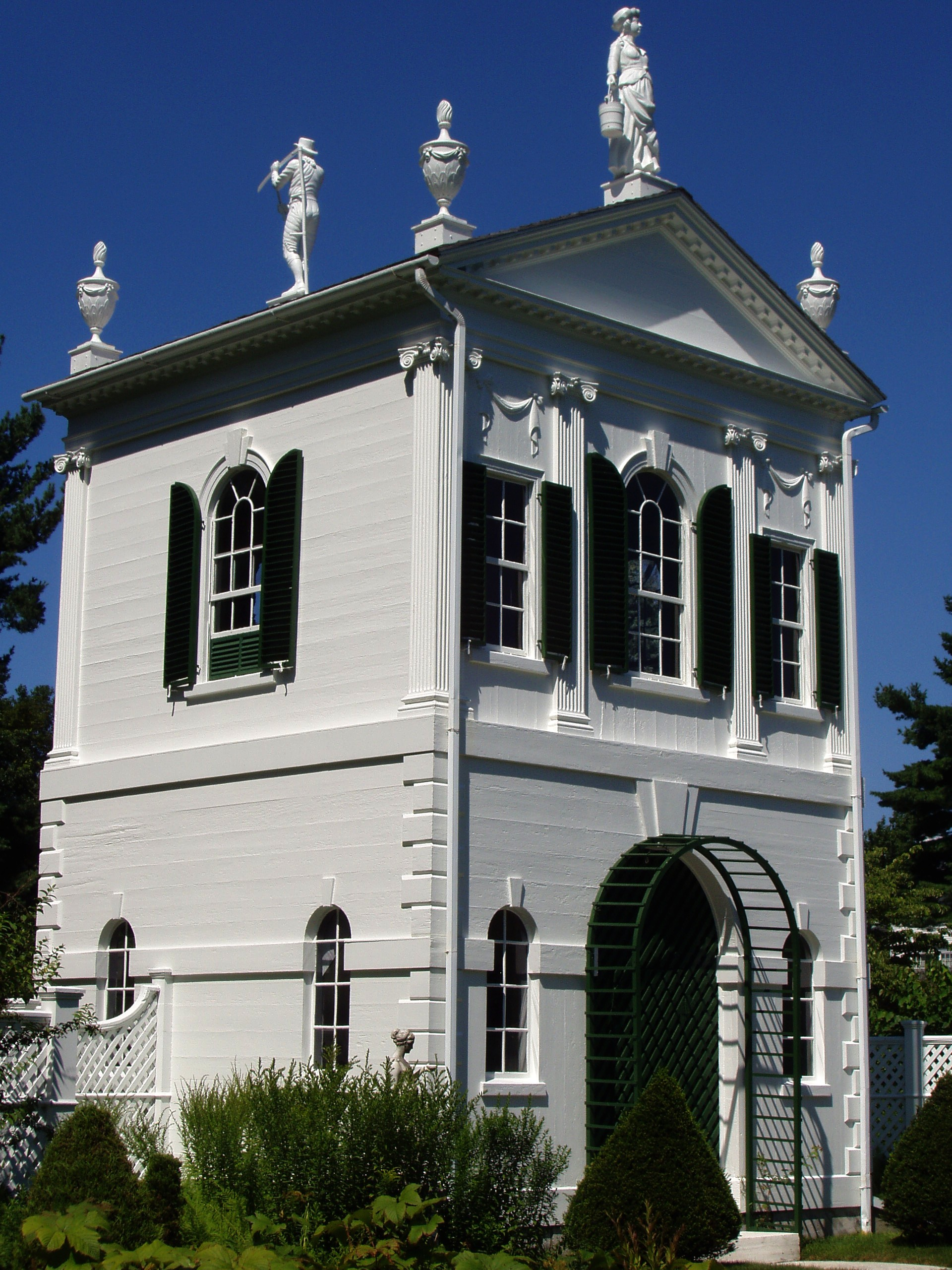
Derby Summer House

== See also ==
- List of historic houses in Massachusetts
