= David Putnam House =

Historic house in Ohio, United States

- Putnam House
- U.S. Historic district – Contributing property
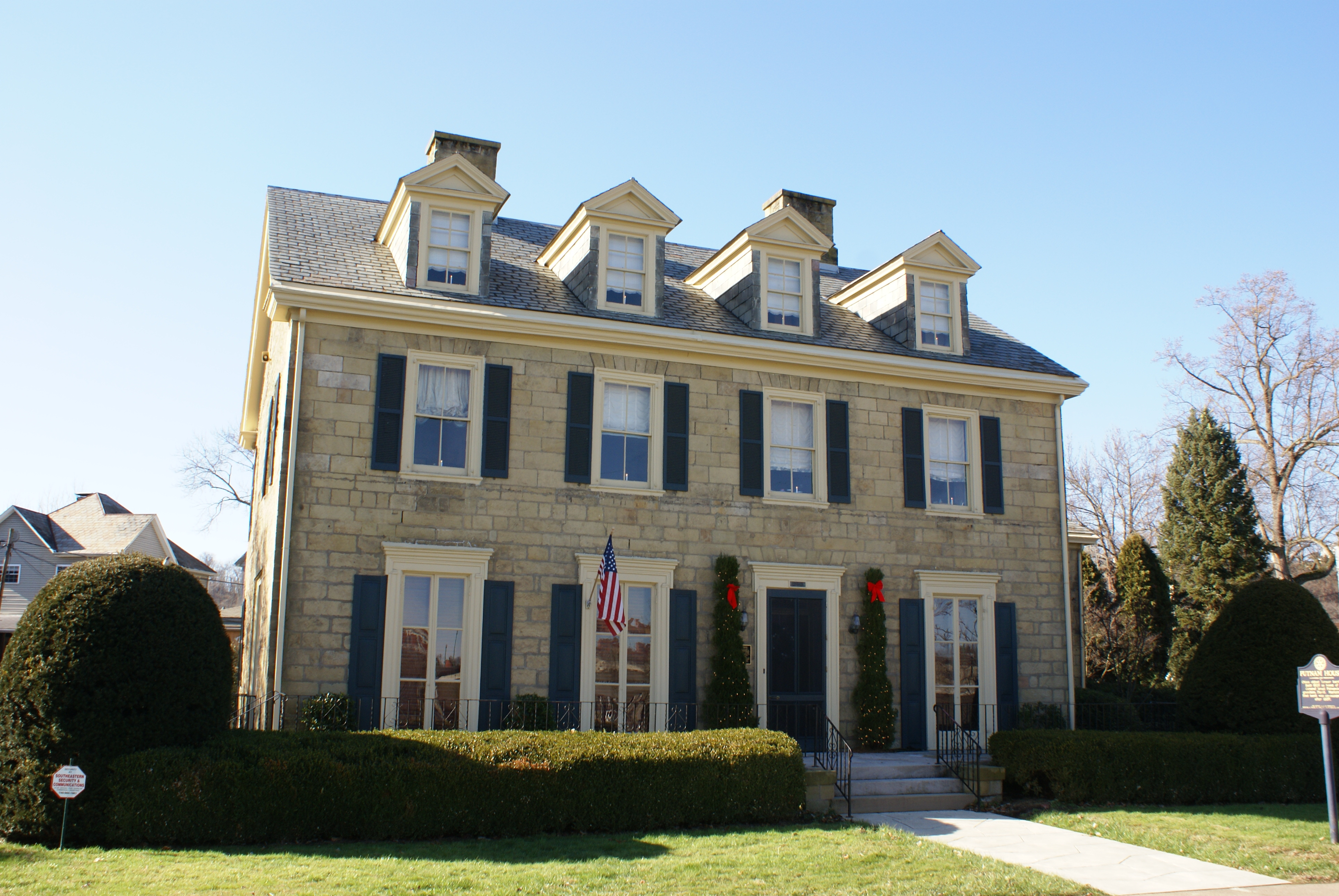
- David Putnam House

- Location within Ohio Location within the United States
- Interactive map showing the location of David Putnam House
- Location: 519 Fort St; Marietta, Ohio
- Coordinates: 39°24′45.5″N 81°27′32.5″W
- Built: First block was laid in 1792 and completed in 1805 during Thomas Jefferson’s term as President
- Architectural style: Federal Style
- Part of: Harmar Historic District (ID74001645)
- Designated CP: 1974

The Putnam House is a historic building in the Harmar neighborhood of Marietta, Washington County, Ohio, United States, on the National Register of Historic Places. The house overlooks the Muskingum River.

The building was finished in 1805 consisting of 16” sandstone blocks quarried locally on Harmer Hill. The home was built for David Putnam, grandson of General Israel Putnam and nephew of General Rufus Putnam. In 1807 it co-housed the first banking corporation in the Northwest Territory and Ohio. David Putnam lived here for 51 years until he died in 1856. The house remained in the Putnam family until 1933. 1981 saw the restoration of the house by the Putnam House Partners.

Marietta's leading abolitionist, David Putnam, Jr. was born in this house in 1808. David Putnam, Jr. used another nearby house as his "station house" on the Underground Railroad, that house was torn down in 1953. It is currently as the headquarters for a packaging company called Mar Pak.
