= Essex North Shore Agricultural and Technical High School =

Essex North Shore Agricultural and Technical School
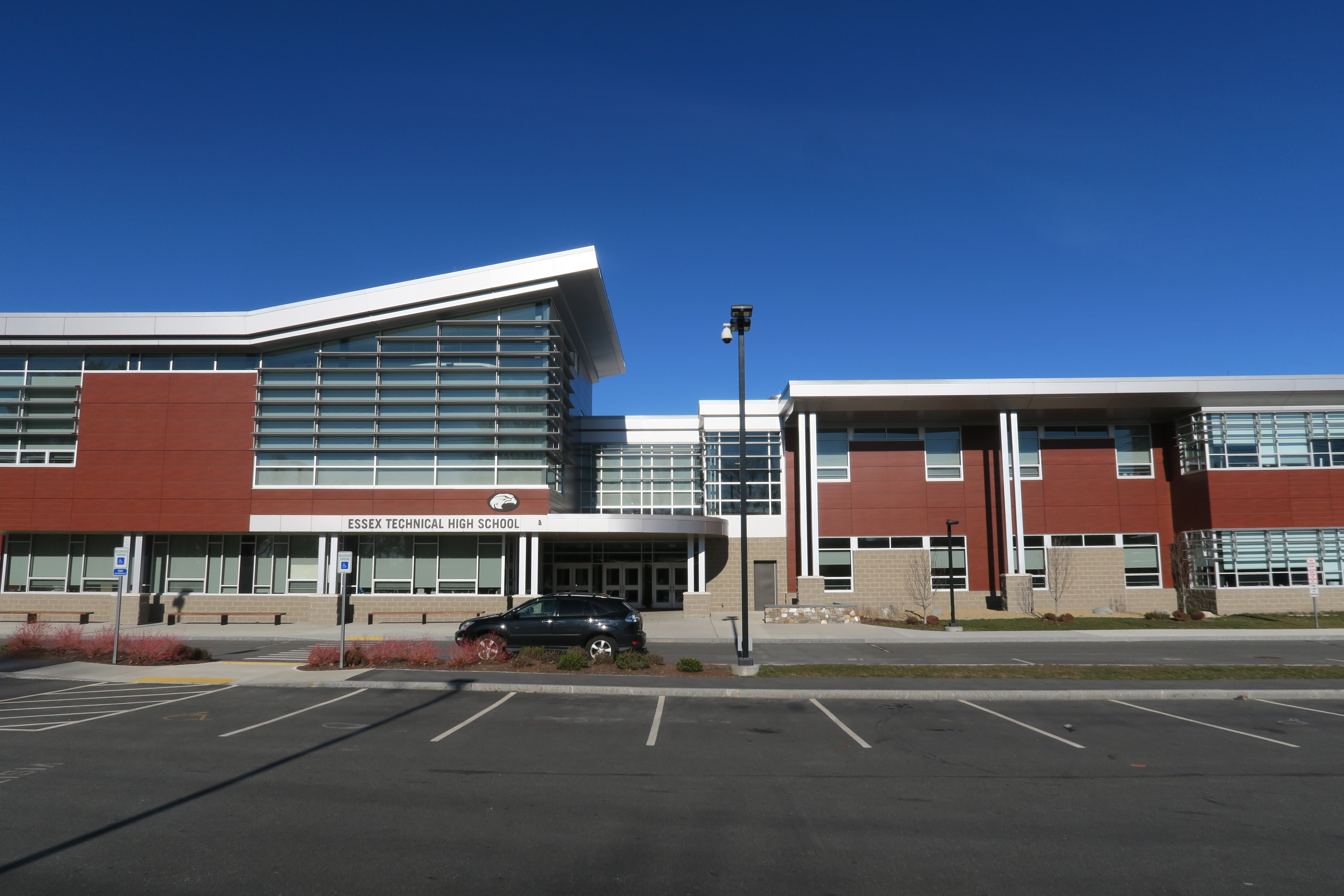
- Essex North Shore Agricultural and Technical School Main Building

Location
- 562 Maple Street; Danvers, Massachusetts 01923; United States
- 42.5902°N 70.9779°W

Information
- School type: Agricultural and Technical School
- Motto: Create, encourage, promote, and develop
- Established: 2014
- CEEB code: 220980
- Principal: Shannon B. Donnelly
- Teaching staff: 141.8
- Grades: 9–12
- Gender: Co-ed
- Enrollment: 1,927 (2025–26)
- Campus size: 166 acres
- Colors: Green and Blue
- Slogan: Roll Hawks
- Athletics conference: Cape Ann League
- Nickname: Essex Tech
- Team name: Hawks
- Budget: $24,240,751 total $19,693 per pupil (2016)
- Website: essexnorthshore.org

Essex North Shore Agricultural and Technical School (Essex Tech) is an agricultural and technical high school located in Hathorne section of Danvers, Massachusetts, United States. Opened in September 2014, Essex Technical High School succeeded North Shore Technical High School in Middleton, Massachusetts, Essex Agricultural High School in Danvers, Massachusetts, and the vocational programs at Peabody Veterans Memorial High School.

== History ==
Essex Aggie was founded in 1913 on land the County of Essex purchased and established the "Essex Agricultural School". The farm was called Maplewood. At one time land was owned by John Putnam, son of the emigrant. Since then it has expanded. In 2014, it merged with North Shore Technical High School and took the CTE programs from Peabody Veterans Memorial High School due to financial issues, so they could expand by having more up-to-date and refined facilities and working areas. The new school was known as Essex Technical High School. On Thursday, March 15, 2018, the School Committee voted to change the name of the school from Essex Technical High School to Essex North Shore Agricultural and Technical School (ENSATS). The decision was made after many key stakeholders weighed in; including parents, students, state representatives, and other community members.

== Curriculum ==
=== Academics ===
Academic classes meet every other five-day "cycle". Each year, students have six core academic classes which meet for an hour each, including English, mathematics, history, science, and Spanish (alternative options offered for some students). The sixth class, for upperclassmen, is a theory class relating to their shop, and pathways for freshmen and sophomores.

=== Career technical education ===
CTE classes or “shops” meet every other five-day “cycle”.

Students can choose from 22 vocational shops, being: Advanced Manufacturing Technology, Animal Science, Automotive Collision Repair & Refinishing, Automotive Technology, Biotechnology, Carpentry, Construction Craft Laborer, Cosmetology, Culinary Arts, Dental Assisting, Design & Visual Communications, Early Childhood & Care, Electricity, Engineering Technology, Environmental Science and Technology, Health Assisting, Heating, Ventilation, Air Conditioning, & Refrigeration, Horticulture, Information Support Systems & Networking, Marketing, Metal Fabrication & Joining Technologies, and Plumbing.

Out-of-district students can only choose from the agricultural programs: Veterinary Science, Sustainable Horticulture, Natural & Environmental Sciences, Landscape & Turf Management, Companion Animals, and Equine Science.

During freshman year, students go through one cycle of Career Discovery where they get to see every shop. In the following cycle, students pick 12 shops they would like to explore further in order of how much they want to explore them. They get seven shops to explore and each two CTE cycle's for the next fourteen weeks they explore a different shop (out-of-district students explore the seven agricultural programs). In January they choose their final CTE program.

Students have physical education or health education during their shop weeks.

=== Nighthawks adult education ===
ENSATS offers adult education courses after school hours.

== Athletics ==
Essex North Shore Agricultural and Technical School offers many different sports for students to compete in. For boys, there is cross country, football, soccer, and golf in the fall sports season. In the winter sports season, there is indoor track, wrestling (with Masco), hockey, and basketball. Lastly, for the spring season, there is baseball, lacrosse, spring track, and volleyball.

For girls, there is cross country, field hockey (with Georgetown), volleyball, soccer, and cheerleading offered in the fall. In the winter, there is basketball, indoor track, hockey (with Fenwick), and winter cheerleading. Lastly, in the spring, there is softball, spring track, and lacrosse.

The school also offers co-ed sports, such as gymnastics, swimming & diving (with Peabody), indoor track, strength and conditioning, and athletic training.

As of Fall 2023, The school's athletic teams, known as the Essex Tech Hawks, compete in the Cape Ann League of the Massachusetts Interscholastic Athletic Association.
