= James Putnam Jr. House =

Historic house in Massachusetts, United States

- U.S. National Register of Historic Places
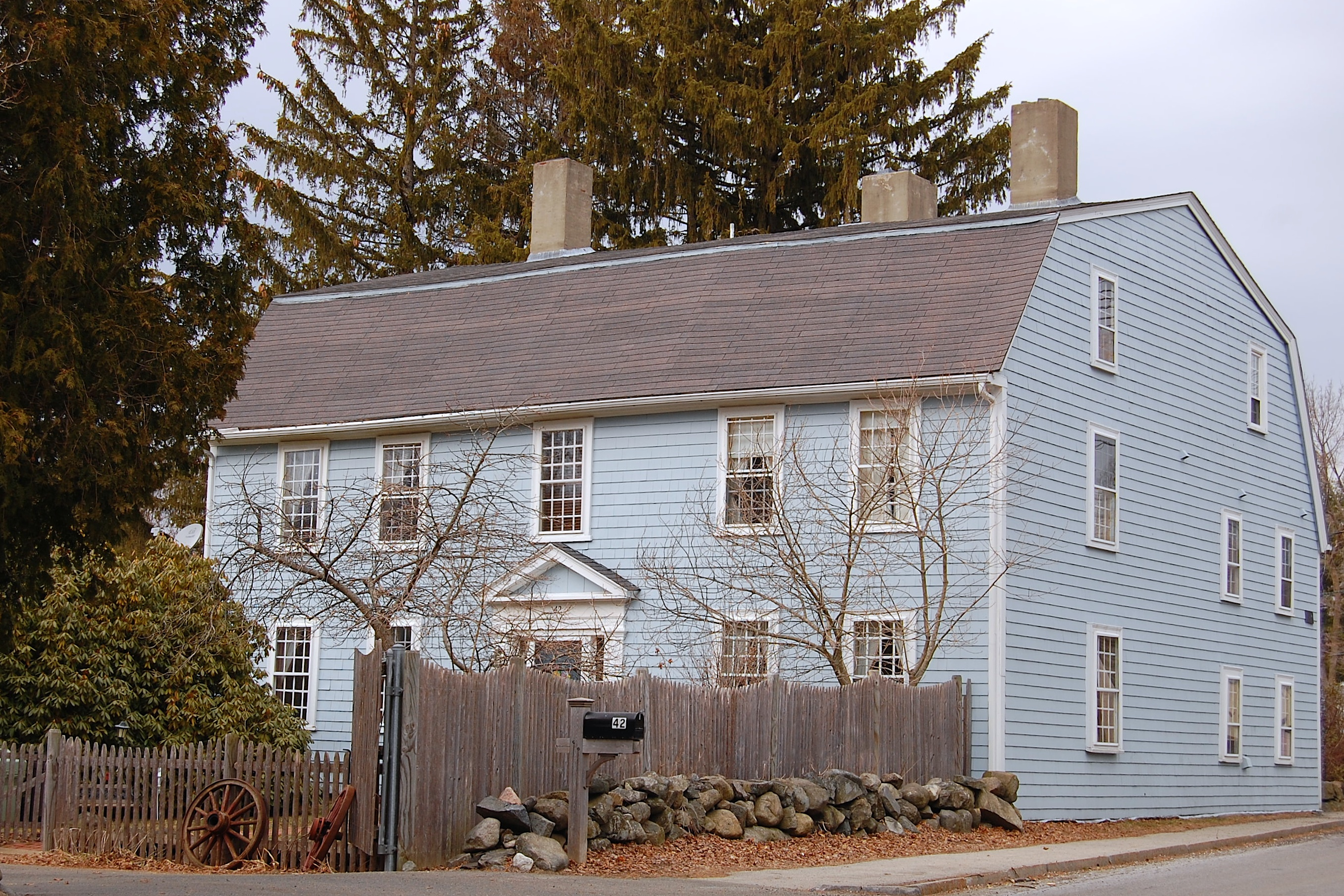
- James Putnam Jr. House at 42 Summer Street

- Location within Massachusetts Location within the United States
- Location: 42 Summer Street, Danvers, Massachusetts
- Coordinates: 42°34′33″N 70°56′58″W
- Built: 1715
- Architectural style: Colonial
- MPS: First Period Buildings of Eastern Massachusetts TR
- NRHP reference No.: 90000205
- Added to NRHP: March 9, 1990

The James Putnam Jr. House is a historic First Period house in Danvers, Massachusetts. It is a 2 1/2-story wood-frame structure, five bays wide, with a gambrel roof pierced by three interior chimneys. The house was built in stages, beginning in about 1715 as a typical First Period double pile house, with a center entrance, chimney and winder staircase (two stories, two rooms wide and one deep). To this another double pile structure was added to the front in the mid 1700’s creating an early Federal style central hall structure. This expansion was completed by the last Attorney General to King George III, who fled to Nova Scotia at the beginning of the Revolution. The house's most prominent Colonial resident was Colonel Timothy Pickering, who leased it from 1802 to 1804, when he was serving as United States Senator.

The house was added to the National Register of Historic Places in 1990.

== See also ==
- National Register of Historic Places listings in Essex County, Massachusetts
- List of the oldest buildings in Massachusetts
