= The Anchorage (Marietta, Ohio) =

Historic house in Ohio, United States

- The Anchorage or Putnam Villa
- U.S. Historic district – Contributing property
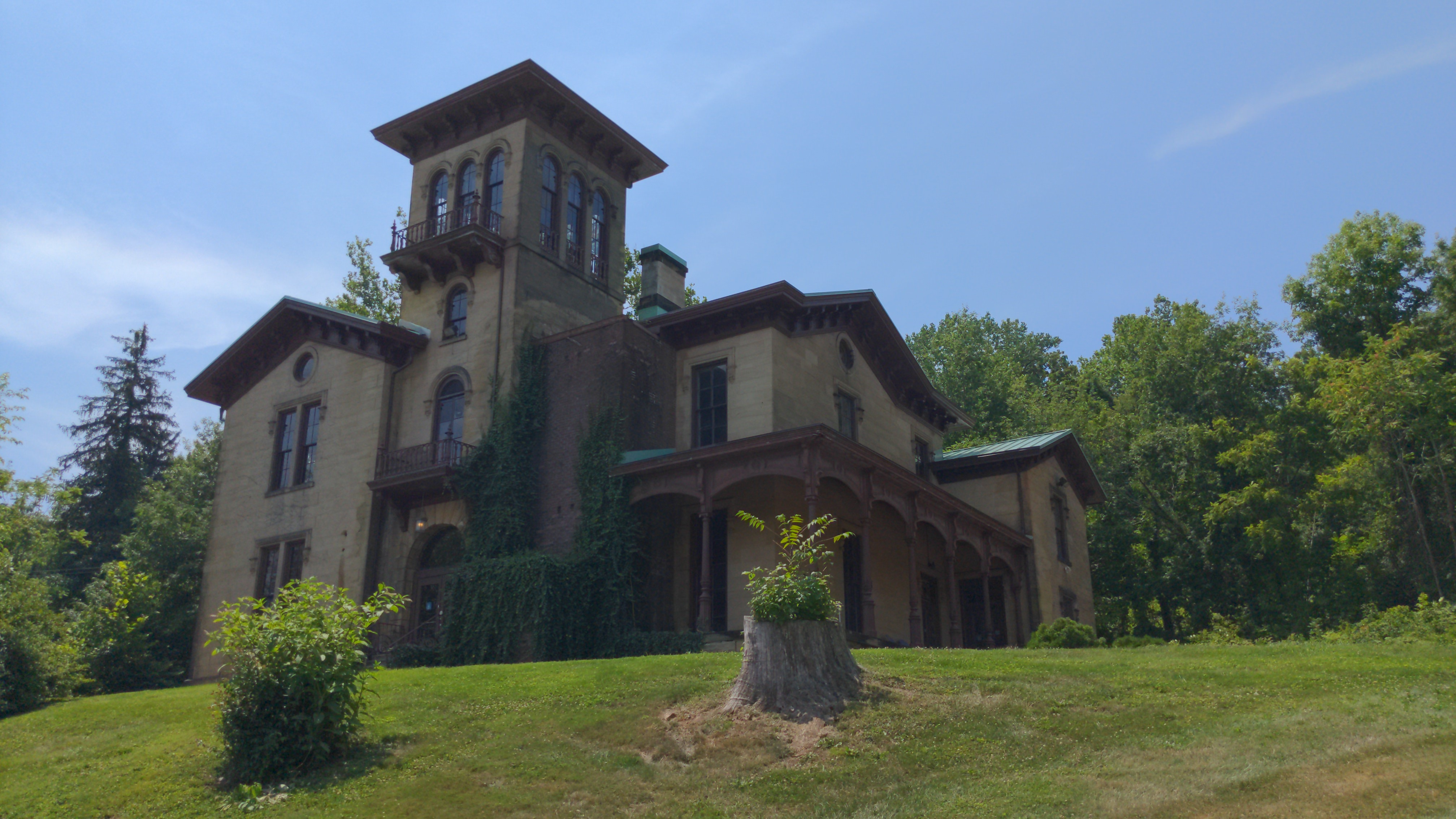

- Location within Ohio Location within the United States
- Location: Marietta, Ohio
- Coordinates: 39°24′48.5″N 81°27′49.0″W
- Built: 1859
- Architect: John Slocomb
- Architectural style: Italiantate Villa
- Part of: Harmar Historic District (ID74001645)
- Designated CP: 1974

The Anchorage is a historical home in the Harmar neighborhood of Marietta, Ohio, United States. Also known as the Putnam Villa, it was built in 1859 by Douglas Putnam for his wife Eliza. Douglas was the great grandson of General Israel Putnam. Douglas' brother, David Putnam, Jr. was the leading abolitionist in Marietta. David was said to frequent the home, leading to the belief the home was used as part of the Underground Railroad although no evidence has been uncovered.

In 1894, the Knox family bought the house from the Putnams. The Knox family was involved in boat building and gave the home the name of The Anchorage. From 1960 to 1986 the house was a nursing home. Since 1996, the home has been owned by the Washington County Historical Society.
