= North Shore Technical High School =

North Shore Vocational Technical High School
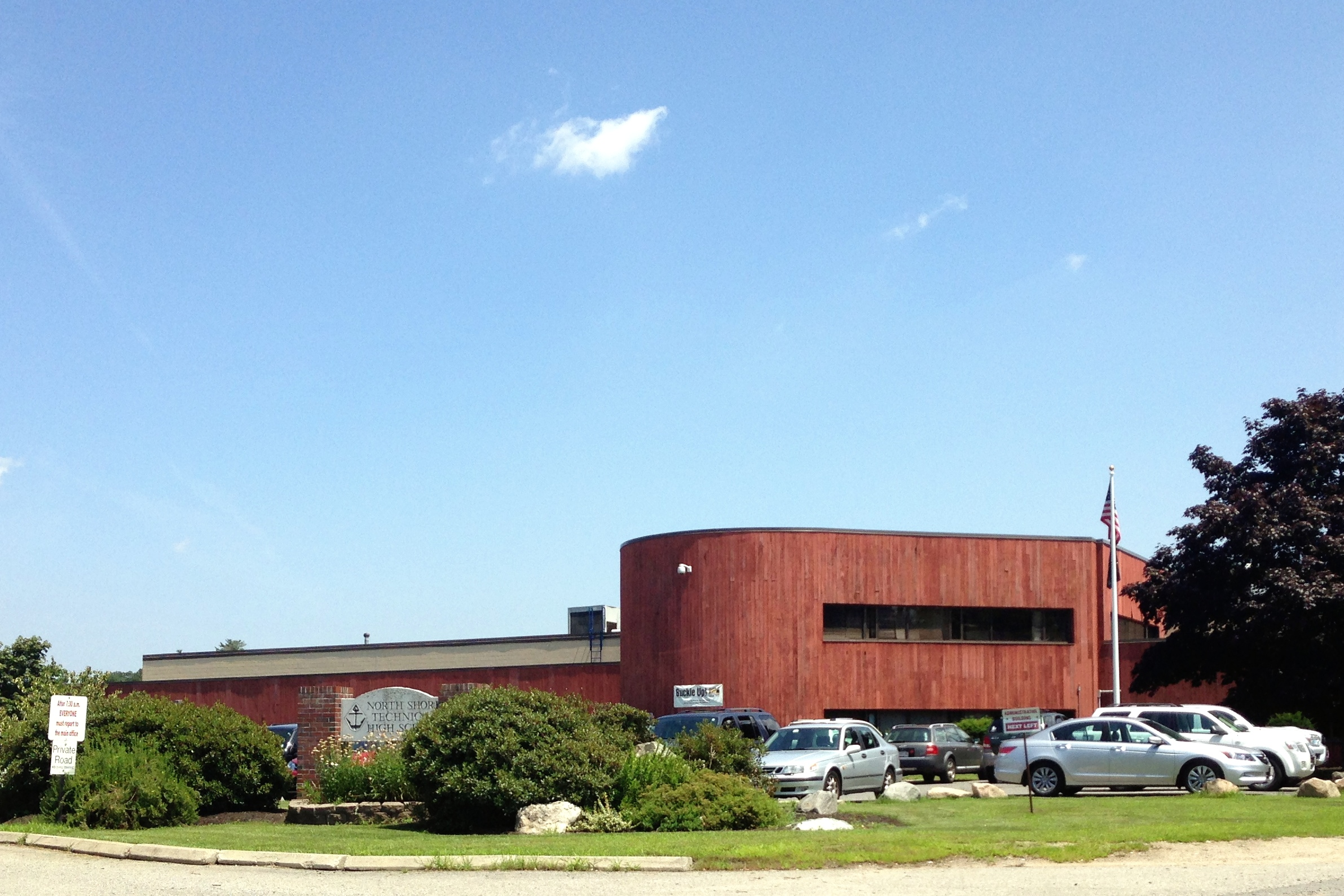

Location
- 30 Logbridge Road; Middleton, Massachusetts 01949; United States
- Coordinates: 42°34′39.36″N 70°59′44.52″W

Information
- School type: Public Vocational-Technical high school
- Founded: 1973
- School district: North Shore Regional Vocational School District
- Superintendent: Daniel O'Connell
- Principal: Brad Morgan
- Grades: 9 - 12
- Language: English
- Colors: Red, white, and blue
- Mascot: Bulldog
- Communities served: Beverly, Boxford, Danvers, Essex, Gloucester, Hamilton, Lynnfield, Manchester-by-the-Sea, Marblehead, Middleton, Nahant, Rockport, Salem, Swampscott, Topsfield, and Wenham.
- Website: Official website

North Shore Technical High School was a public application-type high school located in the town of Middleton in the U.S. state of Massachusetts under the North Shore Regional Vocational School District.

It served ninth through twelfth grade students from 16 communities all on the North Shore. They included Beverly, Boxford, Danvers, Essex, Gloucester, Hamilton, Lynnfield, Manchester-by-the-Sea, Marblehead, Middleton, Nahant, Rockport, Salem, Swampscott, Topsfield, and Wenham. NST was the home to their logo and mascot, the bulldog.

The school served students from 1973 to 2014. On July 1, 2014, North Shore Tech merged with the Essex Agricultural and Technical High School to create Essex Technical High School located in the Hathorne section of Danvers, Massachusetts.

== Class/technical structuring ==
The school operated on a rotating schedule that alternated between academic and technical studies weekly. A-Week began on a Monday, and ended on the end of Friday, while B-Week began on the upcoming Monday and alternated between weeks each Monday continuously throughout the school year. Prior to the 2011–12 school year, the schedule began on a Wednesday, and ending on the end Tuesday, before changing to B-Week, and alternating on Wednesdays.

== Career/technical exploratory program ==
Upon completion of a twelve-week career/technical exploratory program during grade 9, students then selected one technical area in which they concentrated for the remaining three years. Technical programs, or shops rather, included Automotive Technology, Carpentry, Collision Repair, Design and Visual Communications, Cosmetology, Culinary Arts, Electrical, Graphic Arts, Health/Science Technology, Information Technology Services, Machine Technology, and Masonry.

== Notable alumni ==
- Mark Castillo - drummer for the band Crossfade

== Yearbooks ==
Historic Yearbooks have been published in collaboration with The Boston Public Library on archive.org.
