= Rea Putnam Fowler House =

Historic house in Massachusetts, United States

- U.S. National Register of Historic Places
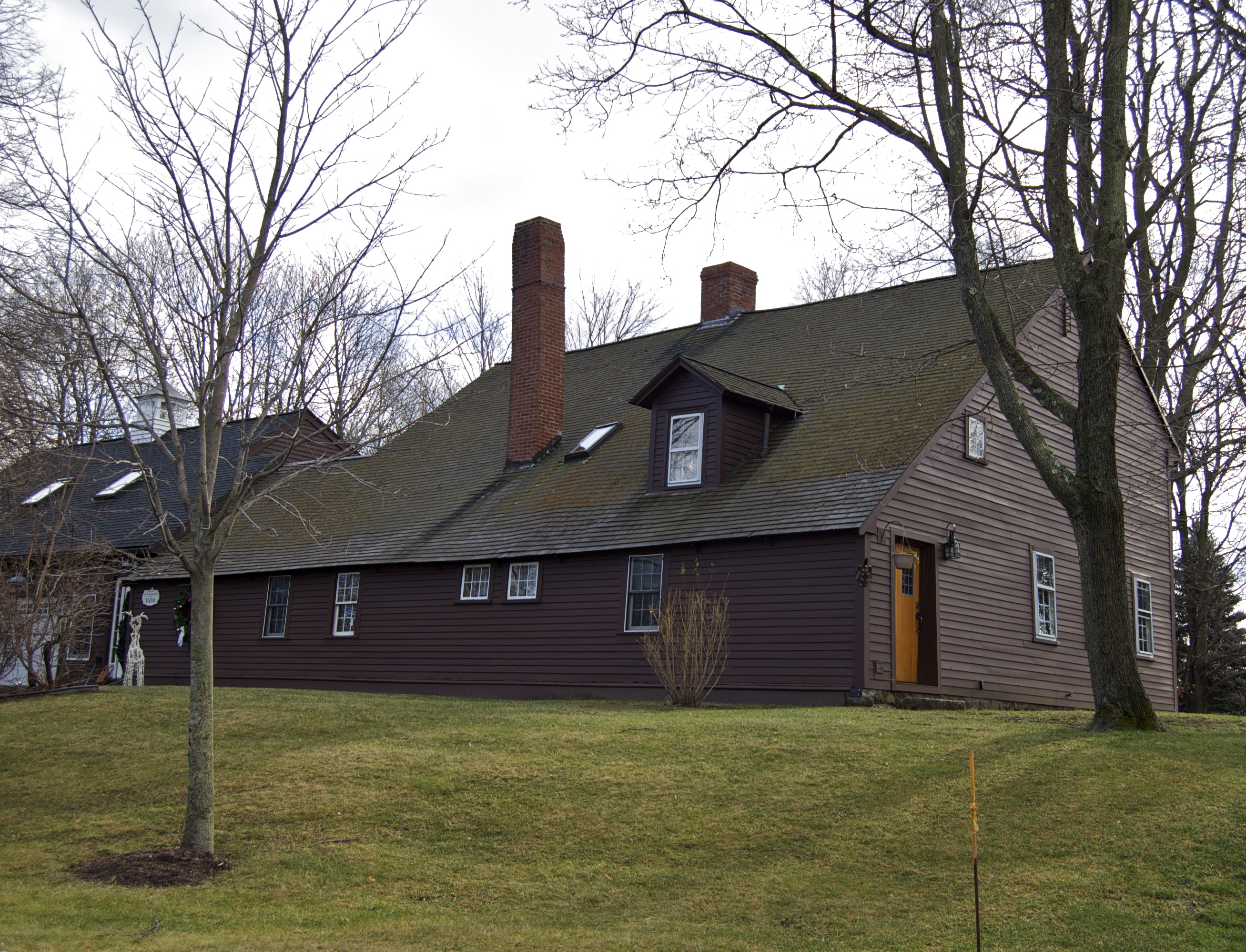
- Rea Putnam Fowler House

- Location within Massachusetts Location within the United States
- Location: 4 Elerton Lane, Danvers, Massachusetts
- Coordinates: 42°34′37″N 70°56′9″W
- Built: 1700
- Architectural style: Colonial, Saltbox
- MPS: First Period Buildings of Eastern Massachusetts TR
- NRHP reference No.: 90000202
- Added to NRHP: March 9, 1990

The Rea Putnam Fowler House is a historic house in Danvers, Massachusetts. It is a 2 1/2-story timber-frame structure, five bays wide with a side gable roof, clapboard siding, and a slender central chimney. A leanto section extends to the rear, giving the house a classic saltbox profile. The leanto section extends beyond one of the sides, creating what is called a "Beverly jog". The front entrance is centered, and is sheltered by a late 18th or early 19th-century porch. The oldest portion of the house, its western three bays and leanto, was built about 1700, and the eastern bays were added about 1725. The original chimney was quite large; the present chimney is a 19th-century replacement, and a second chimney in the leanto is a 20th-century addition. The house underwent a historically sensitive restoration in the 1930s, under the auspices of the Society for the Preservation of New England Antiquities (now Historic New England).

The house was listed on the National Register of Historic Places in 1990.

== See also ==
- National Register of Historic Places listings in Essex County, Massachusetts
- List of the oldest buildings in Massachusetts
