= List of the oldest buildings in Massachusetts =

This article lists the oldest buildings in the Commonwealth of Massachusetts in the United States of America, including the oldest houses in Massachusetts and any other surviving structures. Some dates are approximate (indicated with a "c.") and based on architectural studies and historical records, while other dates are based on dendrochronology. All entries should include citation with reference to: 17th century architectural features; a report by an architectural historian; or dendrochronology. Sites on the list are generally from the First Period of American architecture. Only First Period houses built prior to 1728 are suitable for inclusion on this list or the building must be the oldest of its type.

The Fairbanks House (built 1641) is the oldest house verified using dendrochronology, followed by the James Blake House (built in 1661), but most First Period structures in Massachusetts have not yet been tested with dendrochronology surveys.

== Verified through survey ==
The following structures have been verified using dendrochronology or some other type of architectural survey.

Building	Image	Location	First built	Short summary
Fairbanks House		Dedham	1641	The Fairbanks House is the oldest verified wood-frame house in North America after timbers were dated from 1637–1641 using dendrochronology. This home is largely preserved in its original state with the central complex being the oldest. Later additions (including wings, and lean-tos on the original structure) were added after 1800 as the family's descendants grew in numbers.
Sturgis Library		Barnstable	1644	The Sturgis library was originally built as a parsonage in 1644 for John Lothrop. It was turned into a library in 1867. An architectural survey confirmed a pre-1660 build date. Dendrochronology done in 2014 failed to test the earliest beams.
James Blake House		Dorchester	1661	The James Blake House is the oldest verified house in Boston as determined by a dendrochronology study conducted in 2007. This structure is noteworthy as it contains West England country framing which is rarely seen in the United States. In 1895, the James Blake House was moved to its present location as the city needed to make room for avenue widening. The house retains the same "probable appearance" exterior as built minus two gables that were present at the front end.
Churchill House		Plymouth	1662	The Churchill House is located at 250 Sandwich Street. Beams from the oldest portion of the house were felled in the 1650s and 1661 or 1662, likely making it the oldest house in Plymouth verified with dendrochronology according to Professor J. Ritchie Garrison. Before the dendrochronology study, Churchill House was surveyed in the 1960s and 1970s and believed to have been the home of John's son, Joseph Churchill, and to have been built between 1672 and 1695. Ambrose Gale House Marblehead 1663
Pickering House		Salem	1664	The Pickering House is located at 18 Broad Street in the Chestnut Street District, and has been owned by the same family since it was built. Results from a dendrochronology study conducted in 2007 show that the oldest parts of the house date to the winter of 1663–1664. The extended parlour portion of the house was completed roughly 19 years later. Most of the home's exterior was reworked in 1841 with Gothic Revival style features. The interior of the house has since been restored to its colonial appearance.
Gedney House		Salem	1665	Shipwright Eleazer Gedney acquired the land for a house on April 20, 1664, and a construction date of 1665 was confirmed by dendrochronology in 2002. While the oldest timbers date to 1664–1665, the house has since been modified to its present form. The south end lean-to (later replaced by 1800) was raised to accompany two stories in 1706, and the end wall facing the street was given a framed overhang. A complete gutting of the interior for conversion into apartments occurred before SPNEA acquired the property in 1967.
House of the Seven Gables		Salem	1668	The House of the Seven Gables is a National Historic Landmark. Dendrochronology studies done in 2005 dated the oldest portions of the house to 1668. Later additions to the house include a lean-to and kitchen ell at the back of the house by 1693. Georgian woodwork altered the parlor wing of the original house in 1723. The back part of the original structure was removed in 1794, and in the nineteenth century the decorative gables met the same fate as they were too old fashioned. These were restored along with the original 17th century appearance sometime in the early 20th century.
Merchant–Choate House		Ipswich	1671	This seventeenth century home is also known as the "Tuttle House". Dendrochronological dating shows the earliest portions of the house were completed sometime in 1671 with later additions. The house was extended to the north a year later, and repairs were done to this extension after 1761. Physical evidence shows that two single cell one-and-one-half-story cottages were put together around a central chimney possibly as late as 1705. These structures were later raised to two stories, a lean-to and rear lateral extensions were likely added on during the 18th century. As of 2025, it remains a private residence.
Deane Winthrop House		Winthrop	1675	Dendrochronology confirms that Deane Winthrop built the earliest portion of his house in 1675. This original portion consists of a "single cell" structure which is two and one half stories in height. An addition to the east side was later added by Winthrop in 1695 which widened the chimney bay. The only other known modification is a lean-to spanning the four easternmost bays which was added sometime in the 18th century. There is suspicion that the foundation of the house also dates to this period based on the construction used. This would mean that the house was possibly moved to its present location.
John Capen House		Milton (Note: Moved from Dorchester after 1909.)	1675	This house was originally built in Dorchester by John Capen in 1675. As built, the structure consisted of an end chimney bay and a range of two side by side rooms. An additional room and chamber was added to the right of the chimney in the mid eighteenth century. Later additions were also added to the rear of the house along with a lean-to. The house remained in the Capen family until 1909 when it was scheduled to be demolished. It was saved by Kenneth G. T. Webster, who purchased the house and moved it to Milton where it stood until 2006 when it was disassembled and unsuccessfully offered for sale when a new house was built on its site.
Narbonne House		Salem	1675	The Narbonne House is located on the waterfront at the Salem Maritime National Historic Site and owned by the National Park Service. Dendrochronology conducted in 2002 dated the oldest part of the house which faces west to 1675. A separate story-and-one-half building with gambrel roof was attached to the original portion of the house sometime between 1725 and 1750.
Whipple House		Ipswich	1677	The Whipple House is a National Historic Landmark which was dated using dendrochronology in 2002. The oldest parts of the house were shown to date to 1677 for a house that was two-and-one-half stories in height, featuring a facade gabble. Additions to the house have since been made which occurred in 1690, and later in 1790. The latter of these dates was a substantial addition at 24 feet in length east of the chimney that included a second facade gable. In 1928 the house was moved to its present location where it now serves as a museum.
Coffin House		Newbury	1678	This house features one of the oldest extant examples of the principal rafter/common purlin roof. The "Coffin" house (named after the original land owner) was dated using dendrochronology to 1678, with the oldest portion of the house being the south west ell. Later additions include a cross-wing on the north east side which was added in 1713. The house became two official dwellings in 1785, when the Coffin brothers legally divided the structure.
Benjamin Nye House		Sandwich	1678	The earliest portion of the 2.5-story timber-frame house was built in 1678 by Benjamin Nye, and has remained in the hands of his descendants for most of the time since then. It was apparently originally built as a saltbox style house with an integral lean-to section, with the rear of the house being raise to a full two stories, probably in the 19th century. Oldest building on Cape Cod confirmed via dendrochronology.
Balch House		Beverly	1680	The oldest portion of the Balch house was found to date to 1680 via dendrochronology study. This home was originally a single room cottage one-and-one-half stories in height, with a now removed chimney bay. Later descendants of the Balch family constructed the single room two-story southern part of the house in 1721. The original portion of the house was raised to two stories, and attached to this newer portion which created a central chimney. Modern restoration work was undertaken in 1921–1922, and again in 1961–1962.
Hart House		Ipswich	1680	Dendrochronology shows that the earliest portion of the "Hart" house dates to 1680. The house as built was originally a two-and-one half story single room plan house, with a chimney bay on the east end. An addition was later added onto the opposite side of the chimney c. 1725. Restorations to the house to make it more original took place in 1902 when it was used as a guest house. The Hart House now serves as a tavern, minus a portion of the original structure that was purchased by the Metropolitan Museum of Art in the 1930s as an exhibit.
Cooper–Frost–Austin House		Cambridge	1681	The Cooper–Frost–Austin House was originally built as a single room structure with a chimney bay, and integral lean-to. This two-and-one half story structure was later expanded with the addition of west rooms and lean-to behind them sometime after 1718. It was around this time period that a one-story porch was also added. SPNEA acquired the house in 1912, and it was restored by architect Joseph Everett Chandler.
Pierce House (Dorchester, Massachusetts)		Dorchester	1683	Dendrochronology has dated the oldest portion of the Pierce House to 1683. This section is now located in the middle of the house as additions were added to the two-and-one half story single room plan structure. The house was extended to the west shortly after 1712 and a lean-to was added over time on the entire back side. Further additions were added to the east end of the home in 1765. The kitchen in the west portion of the lean-to was rebuilt and extended slightly to the north in the nineteenth century.
20 White Place		Brookline	1683	The oldest parts of 20 White Place date to 1683, according to a dendrochronology study done in 2007. This home was originally built as a single room structure, and was moved in 1854 to its present location. Its estimated that during this time the exterior was given its "Italianate" appearance. Several one-story additions have since been added to the rear of the building. Interior changes include space rearrangement on both stories. 20 White Place is now a private residence protected through Historic New England's stewardship easement program. 1688 Joseph Willis House Taunton MA https://en.m.wikipedia.org/wiki/Joseph_Willis_House
Boardman House		Saugus	1692	Formerly known as the Scotch Boardman House, the Boardman House has been dated using dendrochronology to 1692. Originally the home had a two-room plan, with a typical hall-and-parlor configuration around a central chimney stack. A lean-to kitchen was added to the house by 1696, and further modifications to the interior were undertaken in the early 1700s. Other than the reconstruction of the lean-to in 1731 the house has not undergone any major changes. The Boardman House now acts as a restored museum.
Paine–Dodge House		Ipswich	1694	
Parson Capen House		Topsfield	1694	Dendrochronology dates the Parson Capen House to 1694, when it was originally built as the parsonage for the local Congregational Church. It was first owned by the Reverend Joseph Capen. The Topsfield Historical Society currently operates the Parson Capen House as a museum.
Dwight–Derby House		Medfield	1697	The earliest portion of the Dwight–Derby House is the southwest block, which has been dated to 1697 using dendrochronology. An extension in the form of a cross wing was added to the east side in 1713. The town of Medfield bought the Dwight-Derby House in 1996, after which restorations took place. It was reported in July 2011 that the Dwight-Derby House was 75% restored to originality.
Benjamin Abbot House		Andover	1711	Dendrochronology has determined that the eastern (right) side of the house was built in 1711.
Old Garrison House		Rockport	1711	The "Old Garrison" house was dated to 1711 through dendrochronology done in 2004. This test was only able to get a single core sample from a log to the left-hand end of the building due to numerous problems. Local histories suggest that the house may in fact be older as an unverified date as early as 1675 has been given.
Captain Robert Haskell House		Beverly	1712	The original parts of the Robert Haskell House include the east rooms and chimney bay, which were built with an integral lean-to in 1712. Dendrochronology shows that the western portion of the house was built later on another site in 1724 with an integral lean-to. These two halves were joined together in Beverly at some point in time based on the side-by-side framing and differences in roof pitch. The lean-to on the east side has since been raised from its original height to two-stories.
The Old Castle		Rockport	1712	Dendrochronology confirms that a build date of 1712 coincides with the home's deed history. The house as built originally consisted of hall and parlor on either side of a central chimney with two chambers and an attic above. A small lobby entry with stairs was present at the front in the central bay. The Old Castle received a back lean-to long kitchen in 1792 when the home was divided by two branches of the original owner's family. Eventually, both portions of the house were purchased by the town of Rockport in 1929. This house is now a museum today.
Holt Hill Farmhouse		Andover	1714	
Bardeen–Culver Barn	—N/a	Dedham (Note: Moved from West Newbury in 2003.)	1715	The Bardeen–Culver Barn was built no later than 1715 in West Newbury. Three of the original four bays of the barn survive today with some of the reused posts dating before 1700. The barn was dismantled in 2003 and reassembled in Dedham to serve as a visitors center for the Fairbanks House.
Bradford House		Kingston	1715	
Clough House		Boston	1715	
John Quincy Adams Birthplace		Quincy	1717	John Quincy Adams Birthplace dates to 1717 via dendrochronology, and was purchased by the Adams family in 1744. This two-room plan building with a central chimney was bequeathed to John Quincy Adams in 1761. An additional lean-to was added sometime in 1764 along with the door trim and secondary entrance. John Quincy Adams was born in this house in 1767, and lived in it until 1783. John Quincy Adam's Birthplace is now owned and operated as a museum by the Federal government of the United States through the National Park Service.
John Adams Birthplace		Quincy	1722	Oldest existing building within which a future President of the United States was born (John Adams, October 30, 1735) The front portion of his birthplace was dated to 1722 by dendrochronology. Other portions of the house including the framing on the east side incorporates a number of reused timbers dating to the 1670s. John Adams Birthplace is now owned and operated as a museum by the Federal government of the United States through the National Park Service.
Bellingham–Cary House		Chelsea	1724	The earliest frontal portion of the Bellingham–Cary House dates to 1724 by dendrochronology study. An extension was added to the rear of the house in 1765. Further enlargements were made to the home until 1791 to create its present appearance. This house is now a historic house museum which was listed on the National Register of Historic Places in 1974.
Proctor House		Peabody (Note: Peabody was part of "Danvers" until 1855.)	1727	Dendrochronology shows that the "Proctor" house was built no later than 1727. This house is commonly associated with John Proctor, who was hung on August 19, 1692 in Salem Village, Massachusetts Bay Colony during the Salem Witch Trials. Historical records suggest that the house was actually built by Jon's son Thorndike as the third property on the family owned property. Parts of the house date from the time of build in the 1720s to the 1900s as different families occupied the home. While the Proctor House is now a private residence, the owners have shared their desire to open it up to the public.
Old Town House		Marblehead	c. 1727	The town house was constructed in 1727 and was a replacement for the Old Meeting House on Franklin Street. The upper level of the building served as a town hall, while the lower level was originally used as a market. Today it is still used for public events, and the upper floor has the G.A.R. Museum.

== Estimates ==
The following structures are claimed to have been built at or around the time attested.

Building	Image	Location	First built	Notes
Williams–Barker House		Scituate	c. 1634	Core of house is believed to date from as early 1634, but is now extensively renovated and currently operated as a tavern. No dendrochronology survey.
Concord Old Block House		Concord	c. 1637	Located at 57 Lowell Road. Part of the house was purportedly an early block house and moved to the current location from elsewhere in town. No dendrochronology survey.
Thomas Bourne House		Marshfield	c. 1639	Located at 1308 Ocean Street; Part of house is believed to date from 1639. No dendrochronology survey.
Richard Sparrow House	Richard Sparrow House	Plymouth	c. 1640	The Richard Sparrow House is a historic house and museum at 42 Summer Street in Plymouth, Massachusetts, and the allegedly the oldest surviving house in Plymouth. No dendrochronology survey.
Samuel Lucius–Thomas Howland House		Plymouth	c. 1640	Located at 36 North Street near Plymouth Rock; House is believed to date from 1640. No dendrochronology survey.
Joseph Andrews–Perez Lincoln House		Chatham	c. 1640	House is believed to date from 1640 and was moved from Hingham to Chatham. No dendrochronology survey.
Capt. Thomas Willett House-Upland Meadows		Kingston	c. 1640	Located at 27 Wapping Road; The back ell of the house is believed to date from 1640. No dendrochronology survey.
Col. John Barstow House		Hanover	c. 1640	Located at 336 Broadway, parts of the house are believed to date from 1640. No dendrochronology survey.
Wing Fort House		East Sandwich	c. 1641	The oldest home in New England continuously owned by the same family; now a museum. Dendrochronological dating was attempted in 2007, but was unsuccessful due to "many of the samples having too many narrow rings, some having too few rings, and to the lack of reference chronologies from the south-eastern part of Massachusetts."
Edmond Hawes–Barker Hunt House		Duxbury	c. 1641	aka as the Edwin Hunt House at 8 Hounds Ditch Lane; House is believed to date from 1641. No dendrochronology survey.
John Doane House		Kingston	c. 1644	Located at 34 Wapping Road; House is believed to date from 1644. No dendrochronology survey.
James Noyes House		Newbury	c. 1641	
Shatswell Planter's Cottage		Ipswich	c. 1641	Currently located on the property at 53 Jeffrey's Neck Rd where it was moved in the twentieth century from another location: "originally located at 88–90 High Street [where it was] the earliest of the three First Period structures on the site, dating to before 1646"; House is believed to date from 1646. No dendrochronology survey.
John Ellis House		Sandwich	c. 1641	located at 76 Main Street
General Israel Putnam House		Danvers	c. 1648	
Edward Wilder House		Hingham	c. 1650	oldest house in the South Hingham Historic District at 597 Main Street.
Edward Brown House		Ipswich	c. 1650	located at 27 High Street
Ford House		Marshfield	c. 1650	91 Old Colony Lane
Samuel Robinson–Michael Chapleman House		Salem	c. 1650	located at 69 Essex St; large eighteenth century addition
Bickman House		Weymouth	c. 1650	located at 84 Sea Street. Right side of building is the oldest house in Weymouth
Old Stockbridge Grist Mill		Scituate	c. 1650	Possibly the oldest mill in Massachusetts
John Harding House		Medfield	c. 1650	74 Harding St. from the timbers of the old garrison, used as protection during the Indian attacks
Goodspeed House		Barnstable	c. 1653	
John Chenery House		Belmont	c. 1654	52 Washington Street
Dexter's Grist Mill		Sandwich	1654	Currently is open to the public and still grinds corn.
Retire Beckett House		Salem	c. 1655	Currently serves as the museum store at the House of Seven Gables after being moved to that location.
Jonathon Keyes Sr. House		Westford	c. 1656	16 Francis Hill Road
Thomas Dane House		Concord	c. 1657	47 Lexington Rd.
Nicholas Wade House		Scituate	c. 1657 – c. 1659	located at 200 Country Way, c. 1657.
Newman–Fiske–Dodge House		Wenham	1658	
Thomas Lord House		Ipswich	c. 1658	17 High Street
James Moulton House		Wenham	c. 1658	123 Cherry St
Caleb Moody House		West Newbury	c. 1658	803 Main Street
Dillingham House		Brewster	c. 1659	
Cpl. John Andrews–Richard Dummer House/The White Horse Inn House		Ipswich	c. 1659	34 High Street
Philip Call House		Ipswich	c. 1659	26 High Street
John Partridge House		Millis	c. 1659	
Dillingham House		Sandwich	c. 1659	71 Main St
Jabez Howland House		Plymouth	1667	Only surviving house in Plymouth where Pilgrims lived
Stephen Bryant House		Plympton	1669	125 County Road in Plympton, MA
Swett–Ilsley House		Newbury	1670	
Judge Samuel Holten House		Danvers	1670	
Chaplin–Clarke House		Rowley	c. 1670	Oldest part built around 1670, lean-to section added around 1700 before a change in ownership.
Gould House		Topsfield	c. 1670	73 Prospect Street, Topsfield. Earliest section 1670; addition of 1700
Joseph Hosmer House		Concord	c. 1672	572 Main St, Concord MA; Core part dates to circa 1672
Vincent House		Edgartown	c. 1672	Oldest house on Martha's Vineyard
Pickman House		Salem	c. 1672	Recent dendrochronology finds trees felled in winter of 1671; museum site has not been updated, but cited source includes audio tour by architectural historian stating new results. Located on Charter Street behind the Peabody Essex Museum, the oldest continually operated museum in America. The house abuts the Witch Memorial is also next to the second oldest burying ground in America.
The Witch House		Salem	1675	Also called the Jonathan Corwin House, this was the home of Judge Jonathan Corwin and is the only structure still standing in Salem, Massachusetts, with direct ties to the Salem Witch Trials of 1692. The house is now a museum operated by the City of Salem, and is open seasonally.
Hoxie House		Sandwich	c. 1675	One of the oldest houses on Cape Cod.
Auld Lang Syne (house)		Nantucket	1675	possibly the oldest house on Nantucket, and a former fisherman's cottage in Siasconset
Peter Tufts House		Medford	c. 1677 – c. 1678	The oldest brick house in Massachusetts.
William Haskell House		Gloucester	1680	
Eastham Windmill		Eastham	1680	Moved from Plymouth to Eastham in 1700s
Paul Revere House		Boston	c. 1680	Oldest building in downtown Boston.
Hoar Tavern		Lincoln	1680	One of the oldest buildings in Lincoln.
Ironmaster's House		Saugus	1681	Also known as the Appleton House. This was part of the Saugus Iron Works, which was a major industrial complex. It has been restored and is open to the public.
John Ward House		Salem	1684	This house is a National Historic Landmark at 132 Essex Street in Salem, Massachusetts, in the Downtown Salem District; it was added to the National Register of Historic Places in 1968.
Whitney Hoar House		Littleton	1685	It was built in 1685 by Josiah Whitney and is the oldest home in Littleton. Home to two generations of the Howe family.
Quincy Homestead		Quincy	1686	Home to four generations of Quincys, including Dorothy Quincy Hancock. Maintained by Commonwealth of Massachusetts Department of Conservation and Recreation as well as the National Society of Colonial Dames in America in the Commonwealth of Massachusetts.
Jethro Coffin House		Nantucket	1686	Oldest house on Nantucket Island on its original foundation.
William Murray House		Salem	1688	A historic house at 39 Essex Street.
Claflin–Richards House		Wenham	1690	Constructed with ogee braces, an architectural hallmark of 16th- and 17th-century English dwellings.
Spencer–Peirce–Little Farm		Newbury	c. 1690	One of the oldest stone buildings in New England.
Old Jail		Barnstable	1690	Oldest wooden prison in America.
Kimball Tavern		Haverhill	1692	The Kimball Tavern is among the oldest buildings in Massachusetts, and one of the oldest buildings in the city of Haverhill. A plaque identifies it as the site of the founding of Bradford College in 1802.
Stanley Lake House		Topsfield	1693	Stanley Lake House, built in 1693, is a historic house at 95 River Road in Topsfield, Massachusetts. It was added to the National Register of Historic Places in 1990.
Browne House		Watertown	1694	Oldest house in Watertown.
Parker Tavern		Reading	1694	Believed to have been built in 1694 by Abraham Bryant. Operated as a tavern during the Revolution by Ephraim Parker. The building was added to the National Register of Historic Places in 1975. No dendrochronology.
Hart House		Lynnfield	c. 1695	
Isaac Goodale House		Ipswich (Note: Moved from Salem in 1928)	c. 1695	Date from architectural survey.
Manning Manse		Billerica	c. 1696	
Deacon Wrestling Brewster House		Kingston	c. 1696	Located at 18 Brewster Brewster Road. It is believed that the house dates to c. 1696 – c. 1700. No dendrochronology survey.
Isaac Winslow House		Marshfield	1699	Residence of a governor of the Plymouth Colony; now a museum.
Alden House		Duxbury	c. 1700	A National Historic Landmark, dating to c. 1700 via dendrochronology.
Solomon Kimball House		Wenham	c. 1700	Although the house is named for its nineteenth- and early twentieth-century owner Solomon Kimball, it was built by Thomas and Mary (Solart) Kilham (or Killam). The date of construction is based on a March 6, 1695/6 timber grant to Thomas Kilham by the town of Wenham, of enough pine timber to yield 700 boards.
Hatch Homestead		Marshfield	c. 1700	Purportedly the oldest continuously occupied house in Massachusetts.
Rebecca Nurse Homestead		Danvers	c. 1700	This house was built around c. 1700.
John Humphreys House		Swampscott	c. 1700	
Dickinson–Pillsbury–Witham House		Georgetown	c. 1700	The Dickinson–Pillsbury–Witham House was listed on the National Register of Historic Places in 1990.
Parkman Tavern		Concord	c. 1700	Cited source estimates date of late 17th or early 18th century
Nathaniel Felton Sr. House		Peabody	1700	Date estimate by Peabody Historical Society, owner
Capt. John Thorndike House		Beverly	1702	With addition dating to late First Period
Old Powder House		Somerville	1704	Oldest stone building in Massachusetts
Coronet John Farnum Jr. House	Cornet John Farnum, Jr., House – Uxbridge, Massachusetts – DSC02844	Uxbridge	c. 1710	The Cornet John Farnum Jr. House was the site of the first Uxbridge Town Meeting in 1727. The house today is a museum and headquarters of the Uxbridge Historical Society. It is an excellent example of early New England colonial architecture.
White–Ellery House		Gloucester	1710	Affirmed traditional date in survey carried out around 2012.
Choate-Caldwell House		Ipswich	1710	House is on display in Smithsonian's National Museum of American History. The oldest rear portion of the house dates to circa 1710.
Peak House		Medfield	1711	The Peak House is a First Period cottage featuring peak style architecture and post-and-beam construction. It is the only freestanding structure of its kind and one of the earliest surviving examples of Post-medieval (Elizabethan) architecture in the United States. First built in 1668, the original structure burned during King Philip's War in 1676 and was later reconstructed.
Buckman Tavern		Lexington	1713	Date included in Historic Structures Report
Parson Barnard House		North Andover	1715	Exposed, beaded beams, integral leanto.
Samuel Chase House		West Newbury	c. 1715	One of the few brick houses of the period.
Jonathan Green House		Stoneham	c. 1720	Structure demonstrates first-period forms and date is recorded in NRHP submission report. The Jonathan Green House is a five bay, center entry house of one room depth. The roof is pierced by a center chimney. Large, exposed oak beams are decorated with molded chamfers and elaborate stops. No dendrochronology survey.
Capt. Timothy Johnson House		North Andover	c. 1720	Exposed, beaded beams; very early gambrel roof.

== See also ==
- List of historic houses in Massachusetts
- First Period houses in Massachusetts (1620–1659)
- First Period houses in Massachusetts (1660–1679)
- Oldest buildings in the United States
