= Capt. Timothy Johnson House =

Historic house in Massachusetts, United States

- U.S. National Register of Historic Places
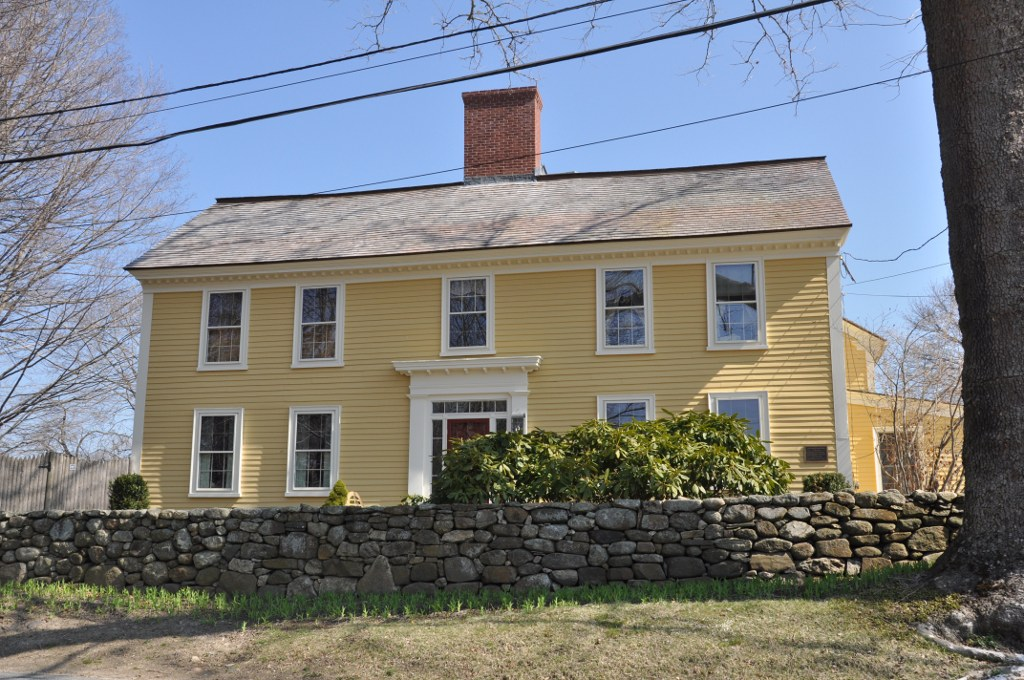

- Location within Massachusetts Location within the United States
- Location: 18 Stevens Street, North Andover, Massachusetts
- Coordinates: 42°41′55″N 71°6′41″W
- Built: c. 1720
- Architectural style: Colonial
- MPS: First Period Buildings of Eastern Massachusetts TR
- NRHP reference No.: 90000249
- Added to NRHP: March 9, 1990

The Capt. Timothy Johnson House is a historic late First Period house in North Andover, Massachusetts. The 2 1/2-story wood-frame gambrel-roofed house was built c. 1720 by Timothy Johnson, a leading Andover resident who led Massachusetts troops in the 1745 Siege of Louisbourg. The building has a wealth of well-preserved first and second period Georgian detailing.

The house was listed on the National Register of Historic Places in 1990., and is currently occupied.

== See also ==
- National Register of Historic Places listings in Essex County, Massachusetts
- List of the oldest buildings in Massachusetts
