= John Partridge House =

Historic house in Massachusetts, United States

- U.S. National Register of Historic Places
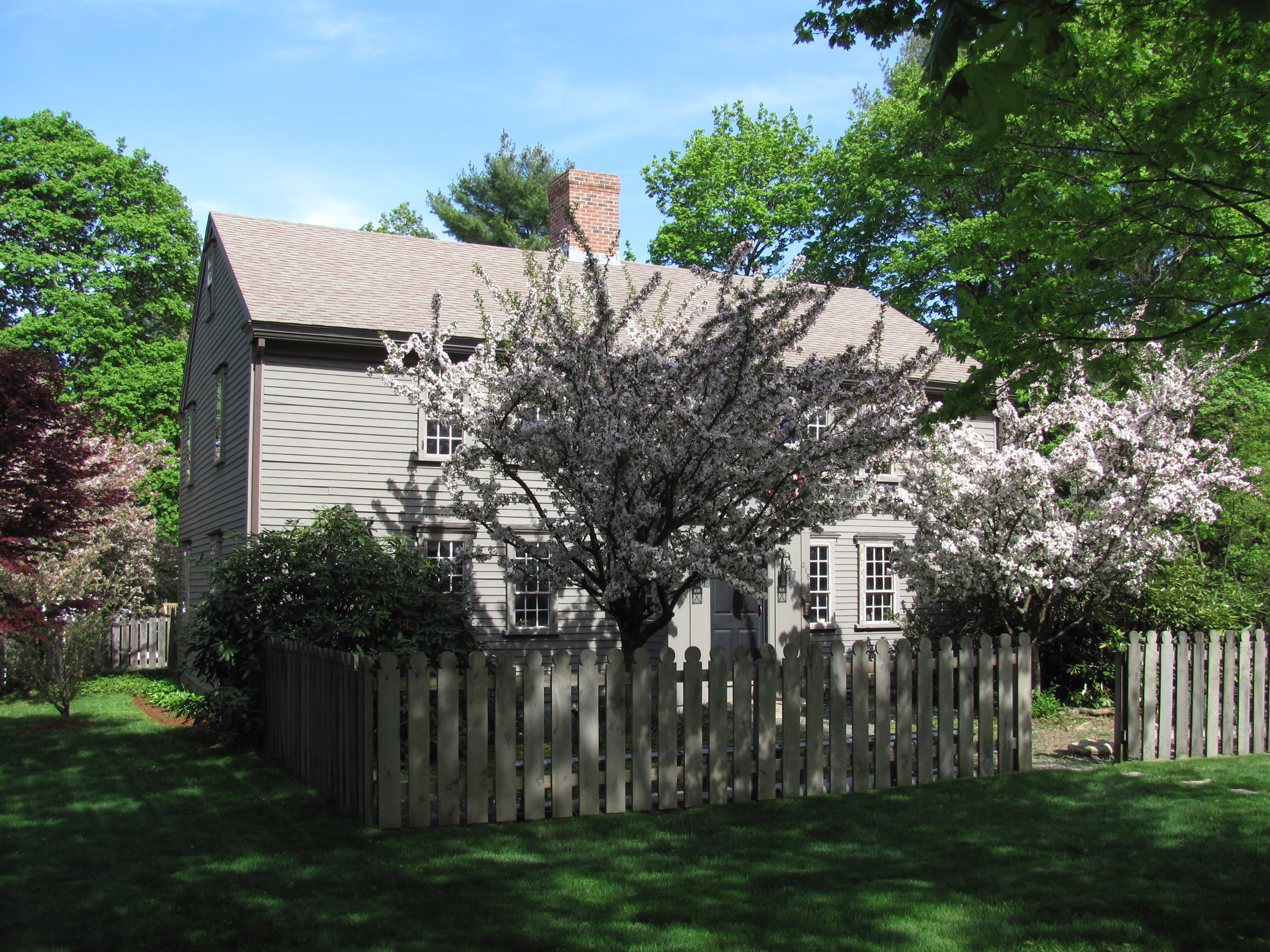
- John Partridge House

- Location within Massachusetts Location within the United States
- Location: 315 Exchange Street, Millis, Massachusetts
- Coordinates: 42°10′34″N 71°21′38″W
- Area: 5 acres (2.0 ha)
- Built: c.1659 (MACRIS) c.1725
- Architectural style: Colonial
- NRHP reference No.: 74000377
- Added to NRHP: October 15, 1974

The John Partridge House is a historic house in Millis, Massachusetts.

== History ==
John Partridge, Sr. was granted land to build a house sometime in 1659. While this year of build date is traditionally used, the house may have been built in the 18th century to its Georgian style architecture. The structure consists of a 2 1/2-story wood-frame house, five bays wide, with a side-gable roof, and large central chimney. The enclosed front porch featuring Greek Revival architecture was later added round 1840. Subsequent additions during the 19th century include the rear southeast kitchen ell, and side shed porch. In the 1930's the house was turned on its foundation to face its current position, and the last and latest addition includes a rear library ell added c. 1940. The house was listed on the National Register of Historic Places in 1974.

== See also ==
- List of the oldest buildings in Massachusetts
- National Register of Historic Places listings in Norfolk County, Massachusetts
