= Sarah Messer =

American poet and author (born 1966)

Sarah Messer (born 1966) is an American poet and author. She was raised in Marshfield, Massachusetts, in the Hatch Homestead, a house built in the 17th century that was the subject of her book Red House: Being a Mostly Accurate Account of New England's Oldest Continuously Lived-In House. Messer has received grants and awards from the National Endowment for the Arts, the Fine Arts Work Center in Provincetown, and others. In 2008-2009, she was a Fellow at the Radcliffe Institute for Advanced Study at Harvard.

Messer earned undergraduate and master's degrees from Middlebury College and the University of Michigan, respectively. For many years she taught as an associate professor at the University of North Carolina at Wilmington in the Department of Creative Writing. In 2010, Messer co-founded One Pause Poetry, an on-line audio archive and reading series in Ann Arbor, Michigan. Currently she teaches at the Residential College at the University of Michigan, and is a cheese maker at White Lotus Farms.

== Works ==
- 2001 Bandit Letters: Poems, poetry collection (ISBN 1-930974-08-6)
- 2004 Red House: Being a Mostly Accurate Account of New England's Oldest Continuously Lived-In House, memoir (ISBN 0-670-03315-4)
- 2015 Dress Made of Mice: Poems, poetry collection (ISBN 978-1-62557-924-9)
- 2015 Having Once Pause: Poems of Zen Master Ikkyu, translation, poetry collection (ISBN 978-0-472-05256-1)
- 2017 Breakout
