= Hart House (Lynnfield, Massachusetts) =

Historic house in Massachusetts, United States

- U.S. National Register of Historic Places
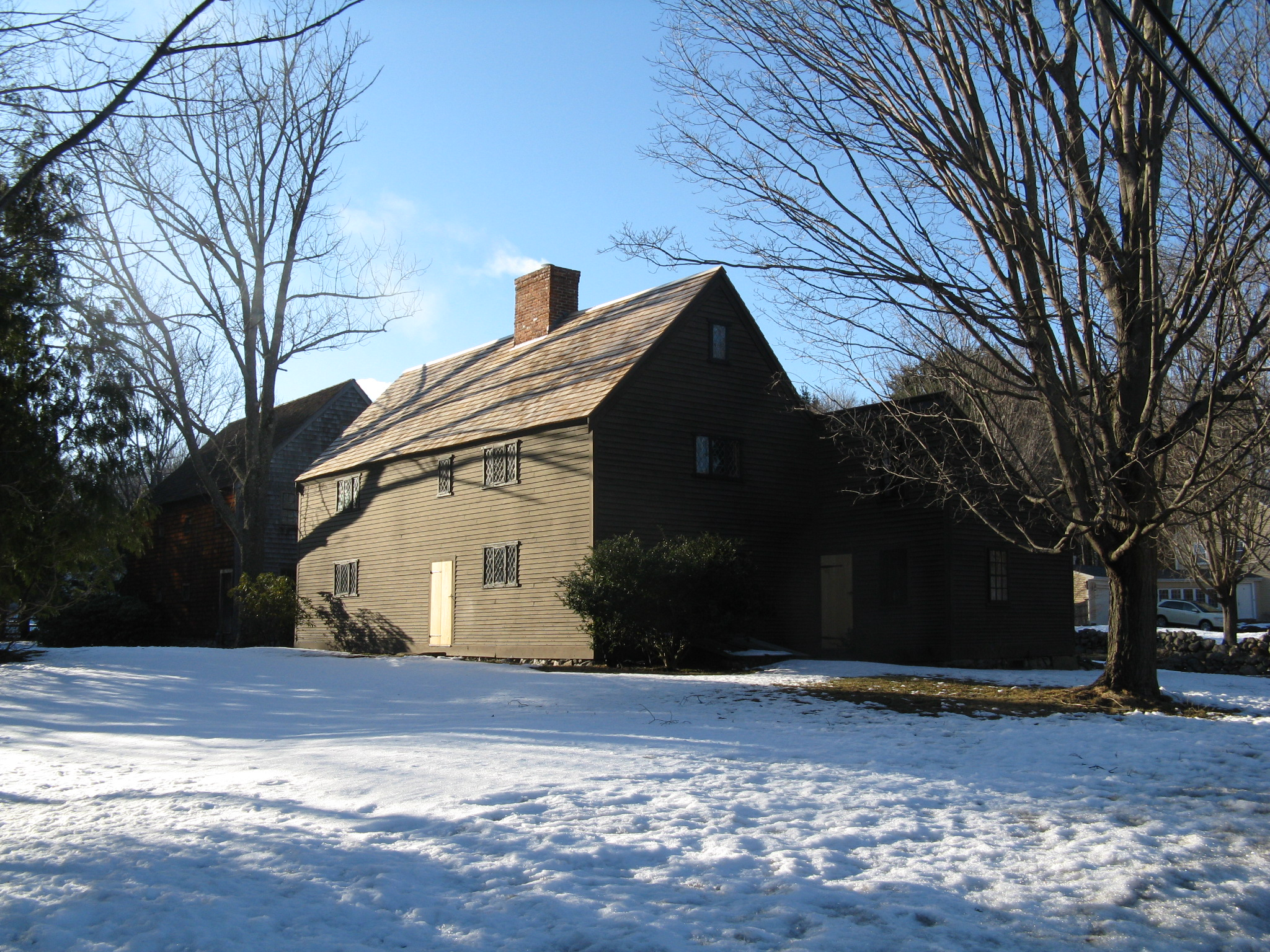
- Hart House

- Location within Massachusetts Location within the United States
- Location: 172 Chestnut Street, Lynnfield, Massachusetts
- Coordinates: 42°32′26″N 71°3′46″W
- Built: 1695
- Architectural style: Colonial
- MPS: First Period Buildings of Eastern Massachusetts TR
- NRHP reference No.: 90000239
- Added to NRHP: March 9, 1990

The Hart House is a historic First Period house in Lynnfield, Massachusetts. The two story, three bay wood-frame house was built in stages. The oldest portion is the front of the house, consisting of two stories of rooms on either side of a central chimney. It was probably built by John Hiram Perkins, the owner of the property from 1695 to 1719. Not long afterward, a leanto section was added to the rear, giving the house its saltbox appearance. It was acquired by John Hart in 1838, and it remained in his family until 1945. Even though the house underwent a major rehabilitation in 1968, its First Period construction is still evident.

The house was listed on the National Register of Historic Places in 1990.

== See also ==
- List of the oldest buildings in Massachusetts
- National Register of Historic Places listings in Essex County, Massachusetts
