= Churchill House (Plymouth, Massachusetts) =

Historic house in Massachusetts, US

Coordinates: 41°56′47″N 70°38′48″W

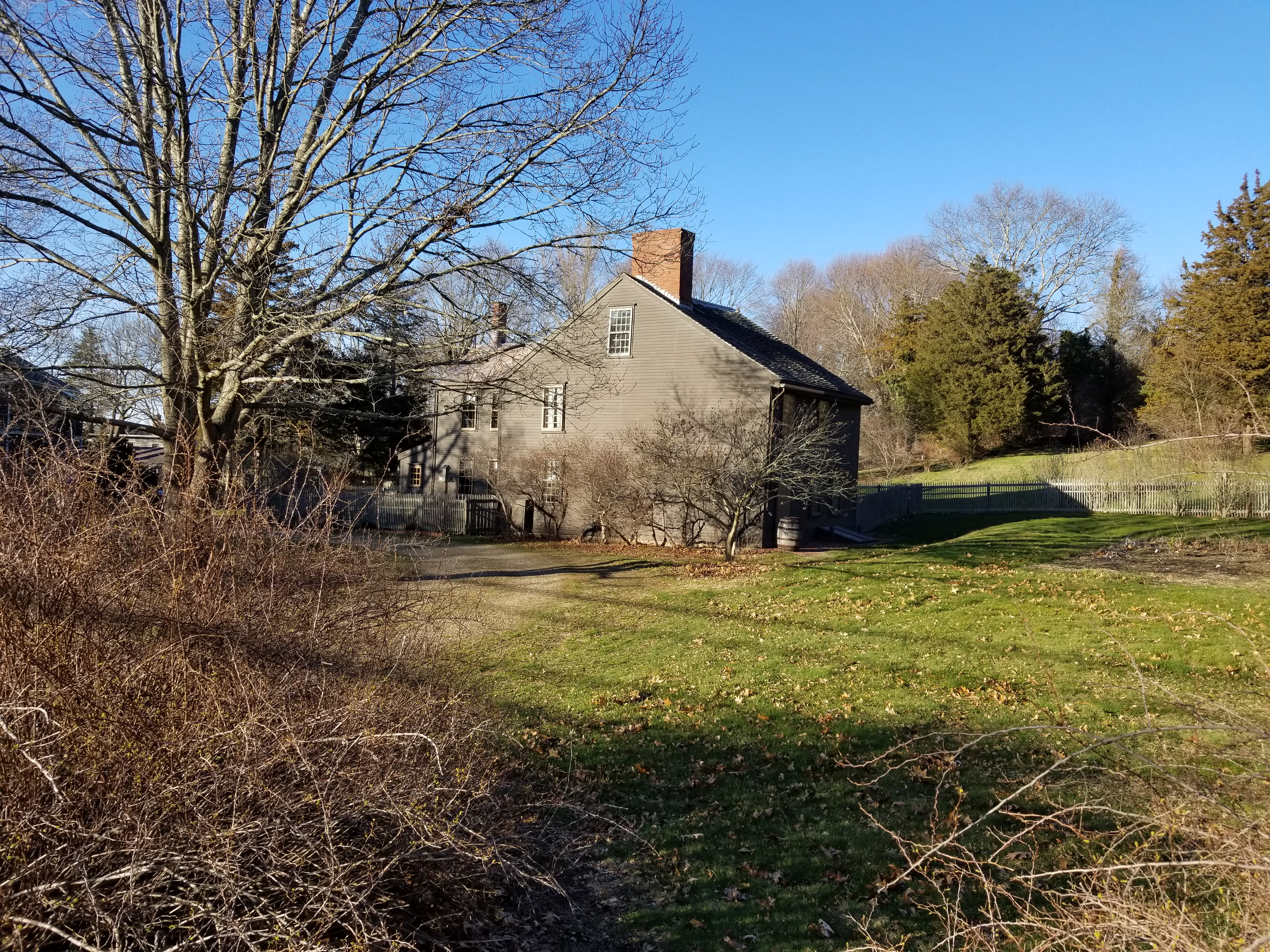
View of southwest end of Churchill House, likely the oldest part, circa 1662

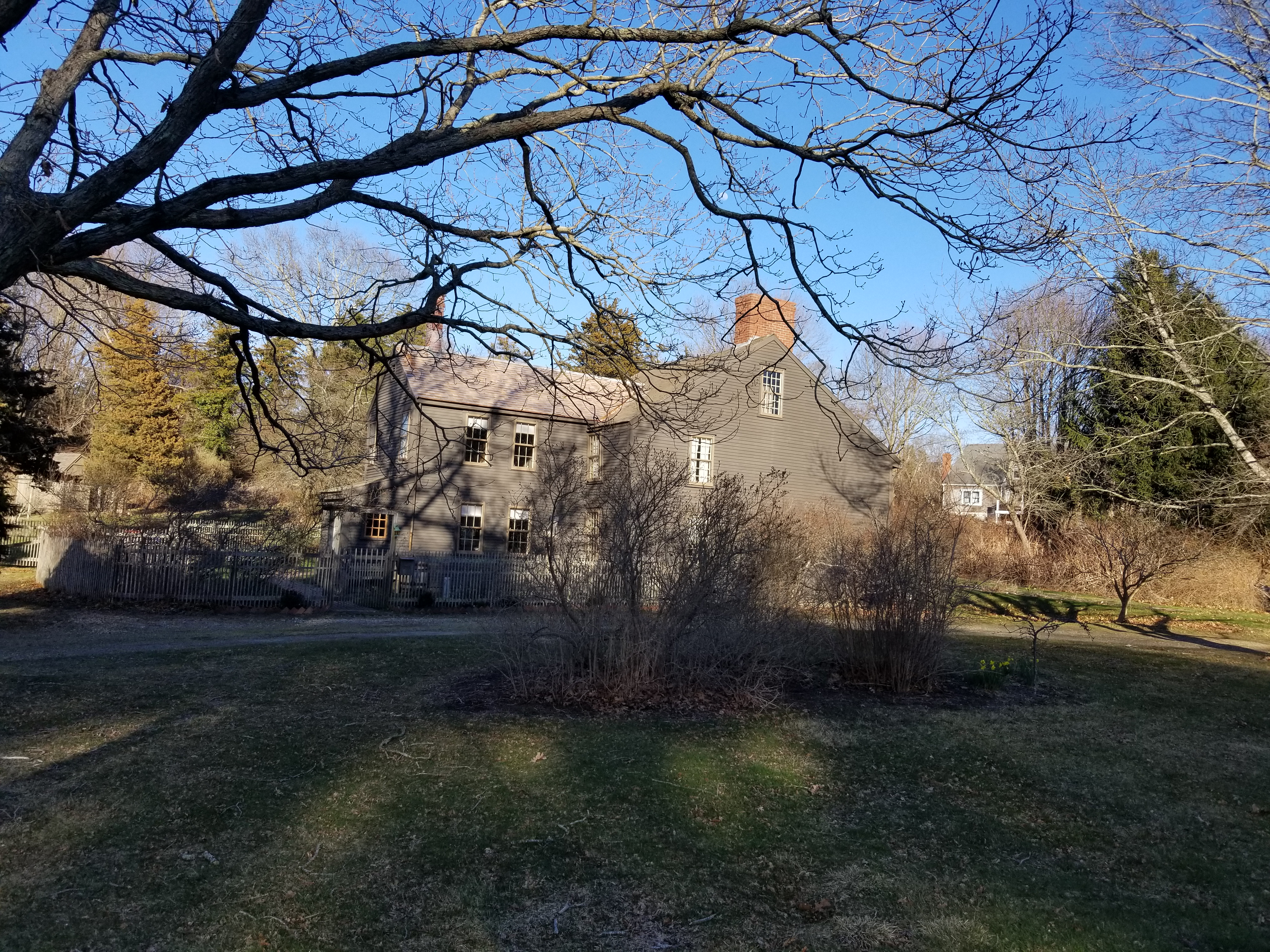
View of northwest side Churchill House

Churchill House is a historic seventeenth-century house (circa 1662) located at 250 Sandwich Street, Plymouth, Massachusetts.

== History ==
According to one source, "[t]he Churchill family arrived in the neighborhood as early as 1643 when John Churchill settled east of Sandwich Street." Churchill House was originally believed to have been the home of John's son, Joseph Churchill, and built between 1672 and 1695, but dendrochronology in 2022 shows that the earliest part of the house was built around 1662.

The house is currently owned by Elizabeth Creeden who has owned the property since 1964 when she and her husband John acquired it from Lewis Morton, who acquired it from Edward W. Bradford in 1954. Bradford acquired it from Arthur Finney in 1924.

== Discovery of age ==
By the 1970s the owners of Churchill house "uncover[ed] within the shell of the late eighteenth-or early nineteenth-century-appearing house at 250 Sandwich Street in Plymouth of a story-and-a-half seventeenth-century planked frame with crossed summer beams". In 2022 dendrochronologists discovered that beams from the oldest portion of the house were felled in the 1650s and in 1661 or 1662, likely making it the oldest house in Plymouth verified with dendrochronology (as well as the third oldest verified in Massachusetts) according to Professor J. Ritchie Garrison who said "the results are indisputable" and will be presented at the 2023 Vernacular Architecture Forum in Plymouth. According to the survey "[t]he south side of the house was the original front, and just inside the door is a small landing and a staircase that leads straight up to a second floor. The original roof beams as well as a slightly later addition that raised the height of the roof are still visible in the stairwell. The paneling that formed the original walls is still there too."

== See also ==
- List of the oldest buildings in Massachusetts
