= Pierce House (Dorchester, Massachusetts) =

Historic house in Massachusetts, United States

- U.S. National Register of Historic Places
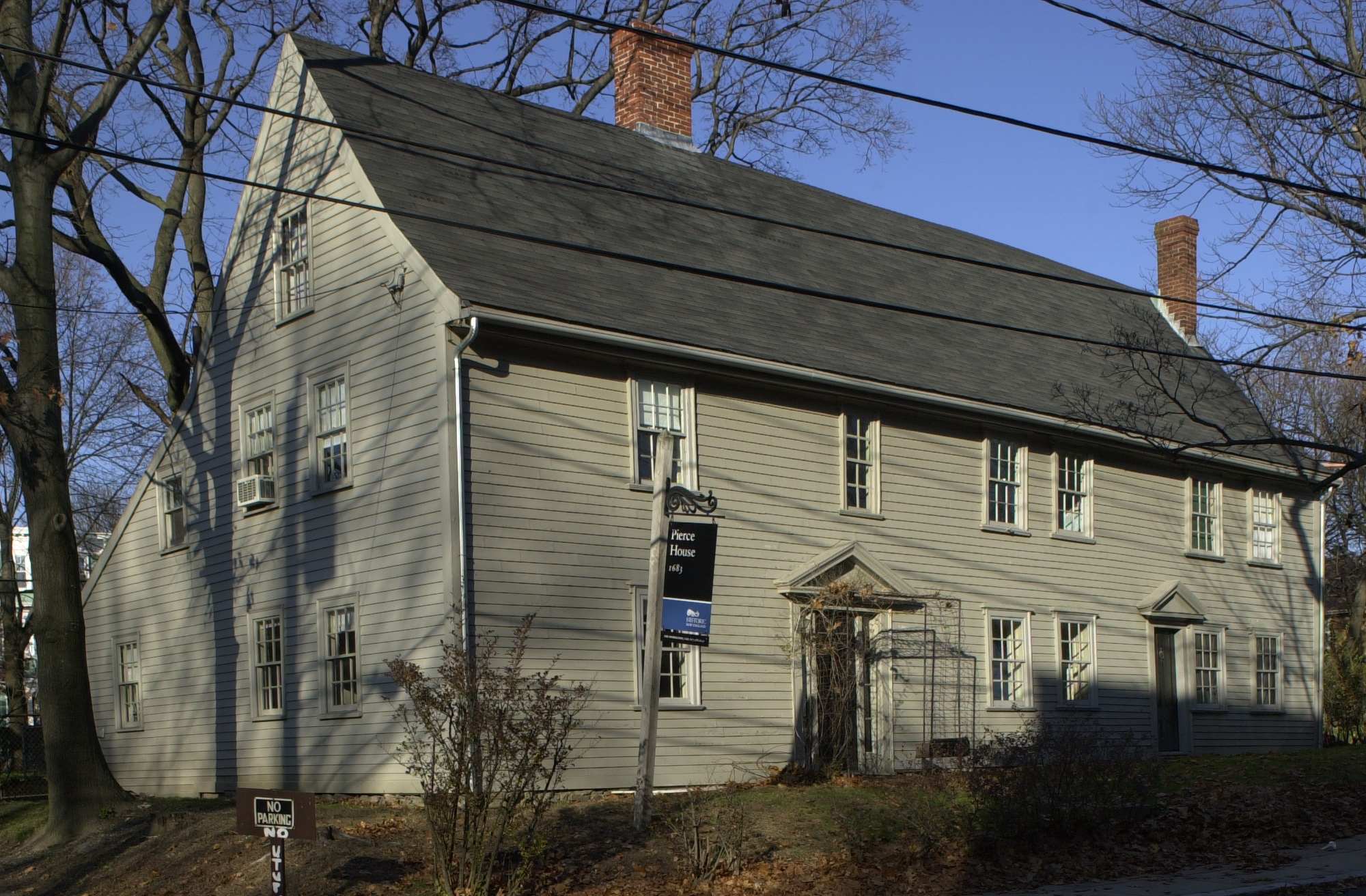

- Location within Massachusetts Location within the United States
- Location: 24 Oakton Ave., Boston, Massachusetts
- Coordinates: 42°17′12.8″N 71°3′12.0″W
- Built: 1683
- Architectural style: Colonial, Saltbox
- NRHP reference No.: 74000917
- Added to NRHP: April 26, 1974

The Pierce House is a rare 17th-century (First Period) house at 24 Oakton Avenue in the Dorchester neighborhood in Boston, Massachusetts. Built c. 1683, It documents period building practices, and the tastes and housing needs of one family, the Pierces, over more than three centuries. At different times, family members expanded and adapted their dwelling to meet new demands for space, function, comfort, privacy, and cleanliness.

The history of the Pierce family, ten generations of whom lived in the Pierce House, highlights important aspects of social history, community history, and New England history. On the most direct level it tells the story of a New England family over the course of three hundred and fifty years. The Pierces, like other families of their class, worked hard to provide for themselves and their children and to preserve their legacy; to do so they continually had to adapt to changing circumstances. They took part in both local and national events; during the American Revolution, for example, Colonel Samuel Pierce (1736–1815), participated in the fortification of Dorchester Heights.

It was listed on the National Register of Historic Places in 1974.

The house is now owned by Historic New England, which operates it as a historic house museum, with school and youth programs.

== See also ==
- List of the oldest buildings in Massachusetts
- National Register of Historic Places listings in southern Boston, Massachusetts
