= Hart House (Ipswich, Massachusetts) =

Coordinates: 42°41′04″N 70°51′06″W

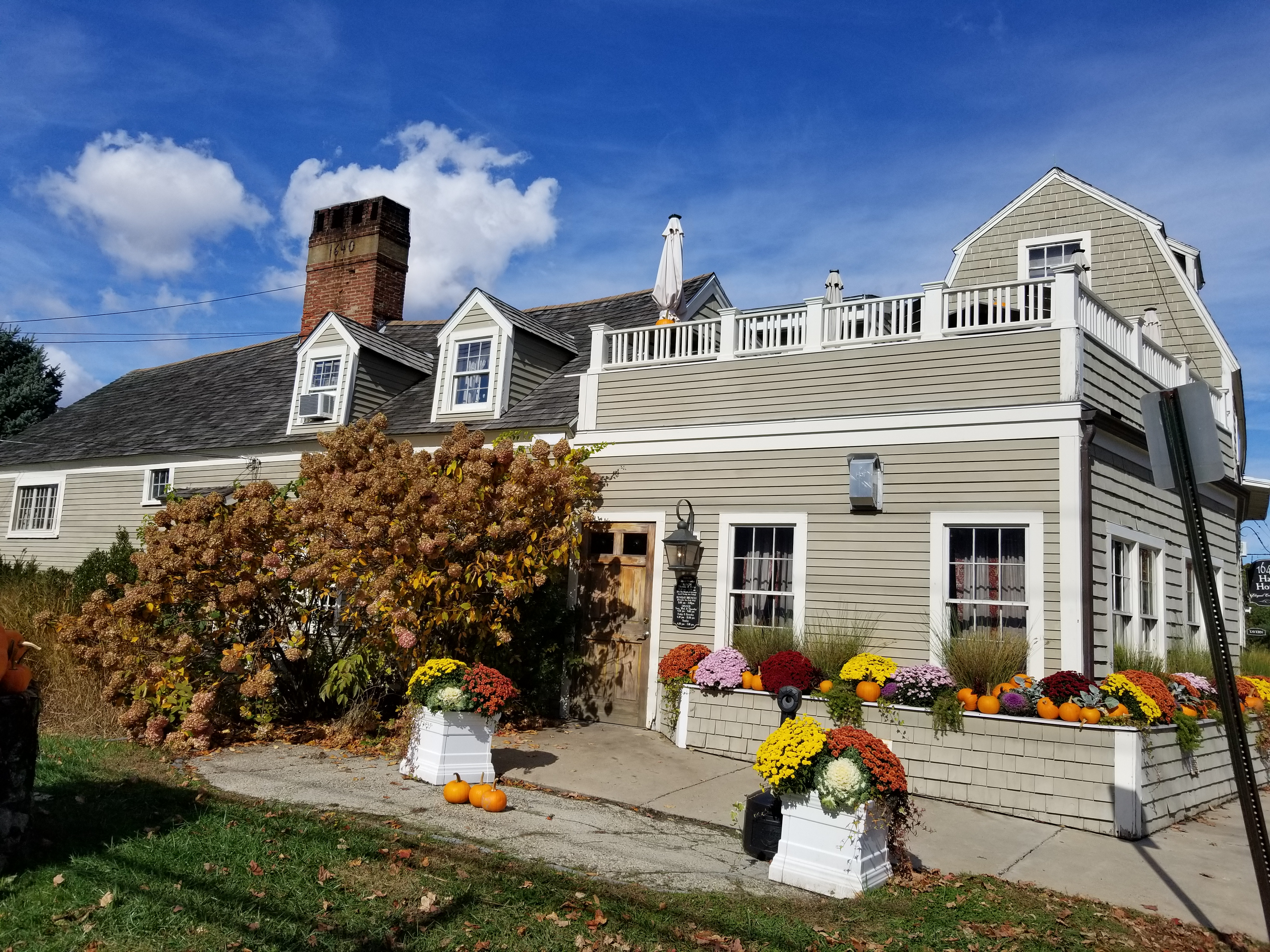
Hart House in Ipswich is currently a restaurant. The oldest portion of the building is to the far left.

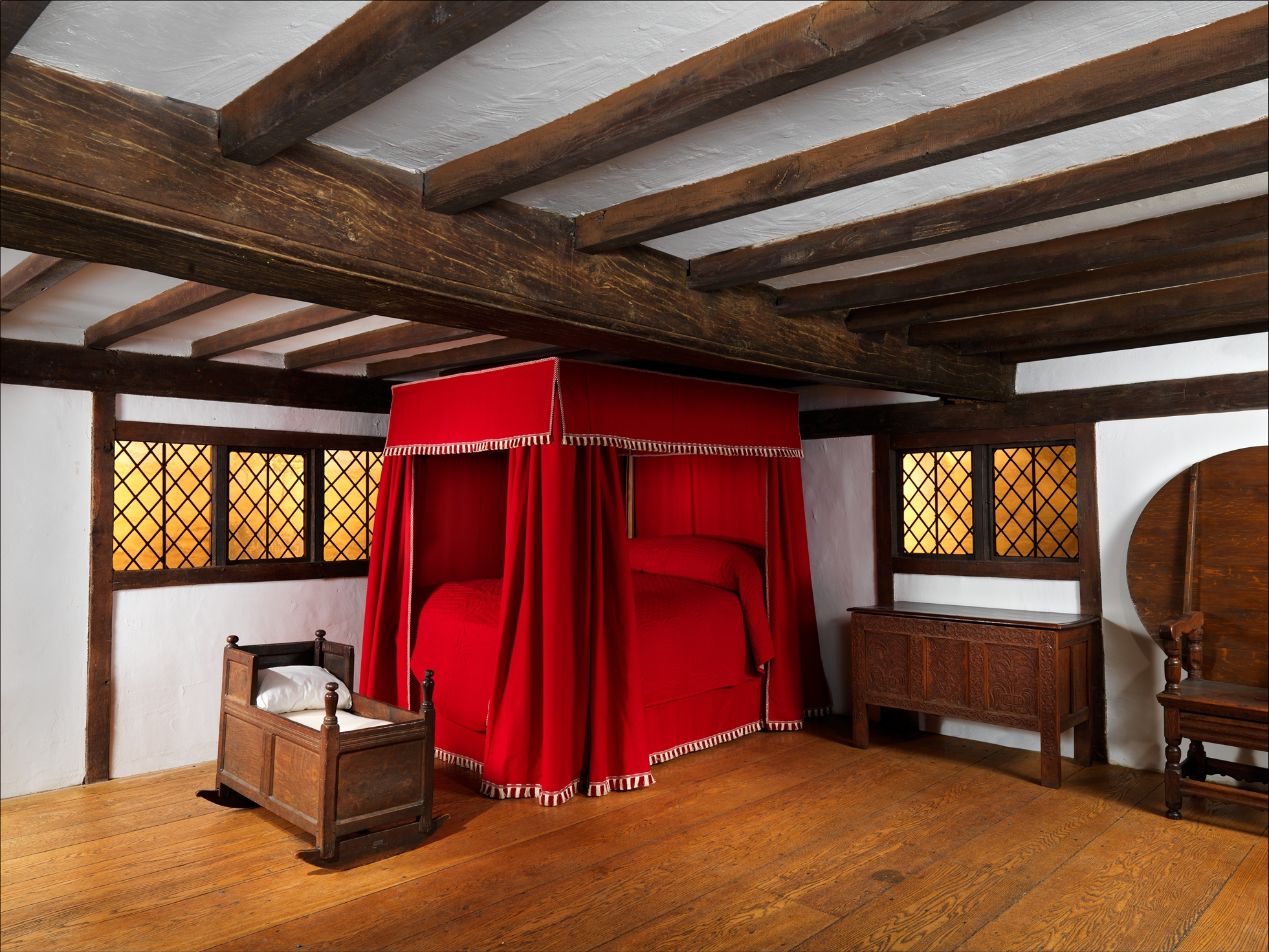
Room from Hart House at the Metropolitan Museum of Art in New York. The MET room was taken from the far left side the first floor of the house.

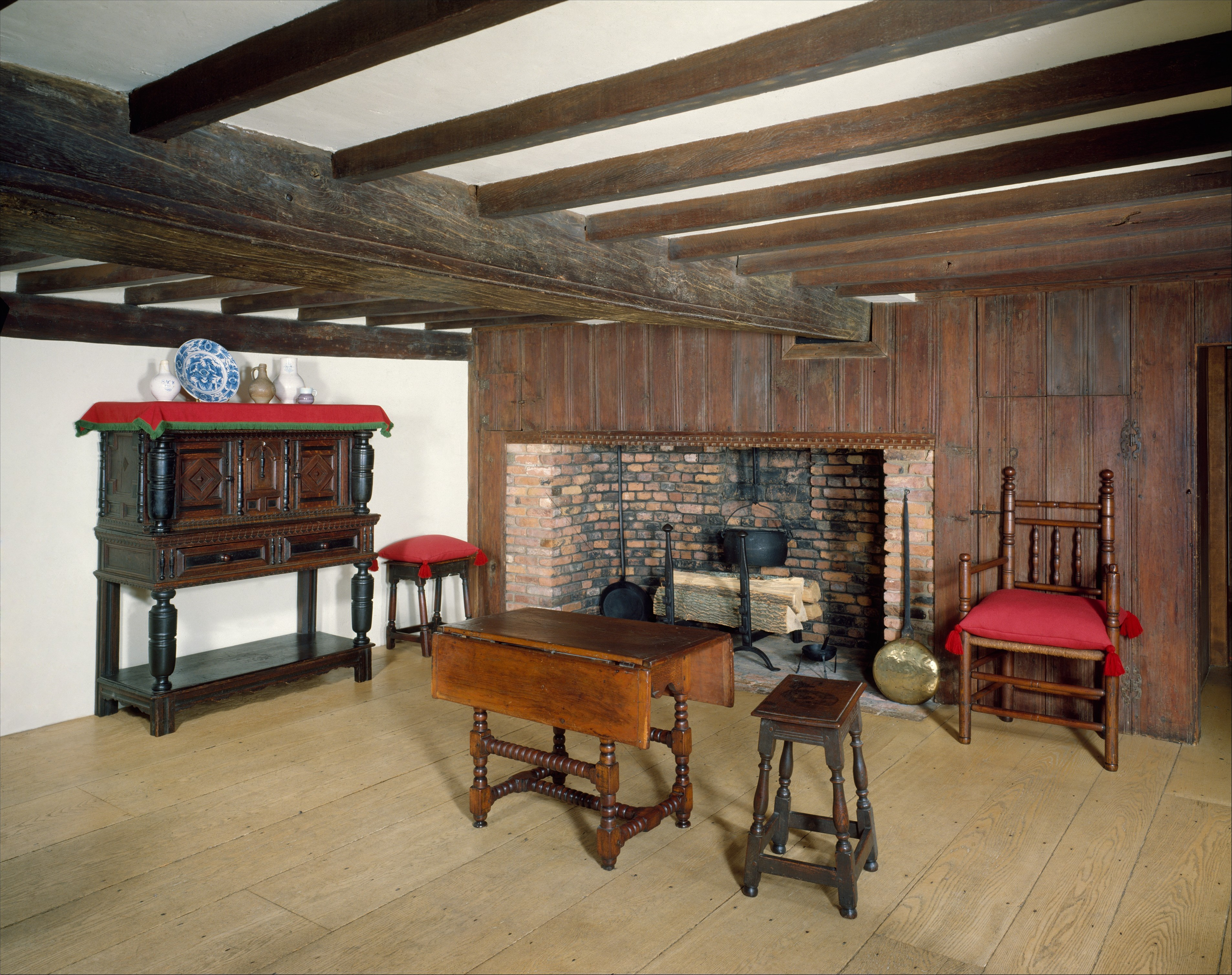
Room from Hart House at the Metropolitan Museum of Art in New York

Hart House is a historic First Period colonial house at 51 Linebrook Road in Ipswich, Massachusetts.

A dendrochronology survey in 2007 proved that the earliest portion of the "Hart" house dates to 1680 when it was built by a newly married Samuel Hart, a tanner. For many years it was thought to date to 1640 as the home of his father, Thomas Hart. The house as originally built was a two-and-one half story single room plan house, with a chimney bay on the east end. An addition was later added onto the opposite side of the chimney c. 1725. Restorations to the house to make it more original took place in 1902 when it was used as a guest house. Two full interior rooms from the original structure were purchased in the 1930s by New York's Metropolitan Museum of Art (purchased a downstairs room) and Delaware's Winterthur Museum (purchased an upstairs room) as exhibits. The Hart House now serves as a tavern and restaurant in Ipswich.

== See also ==
- List of the oldest buildings in Massachusetts
