= Goodspeed House =

Historic house in Massachusetts, United States

- U.S. National Register of Historic Places
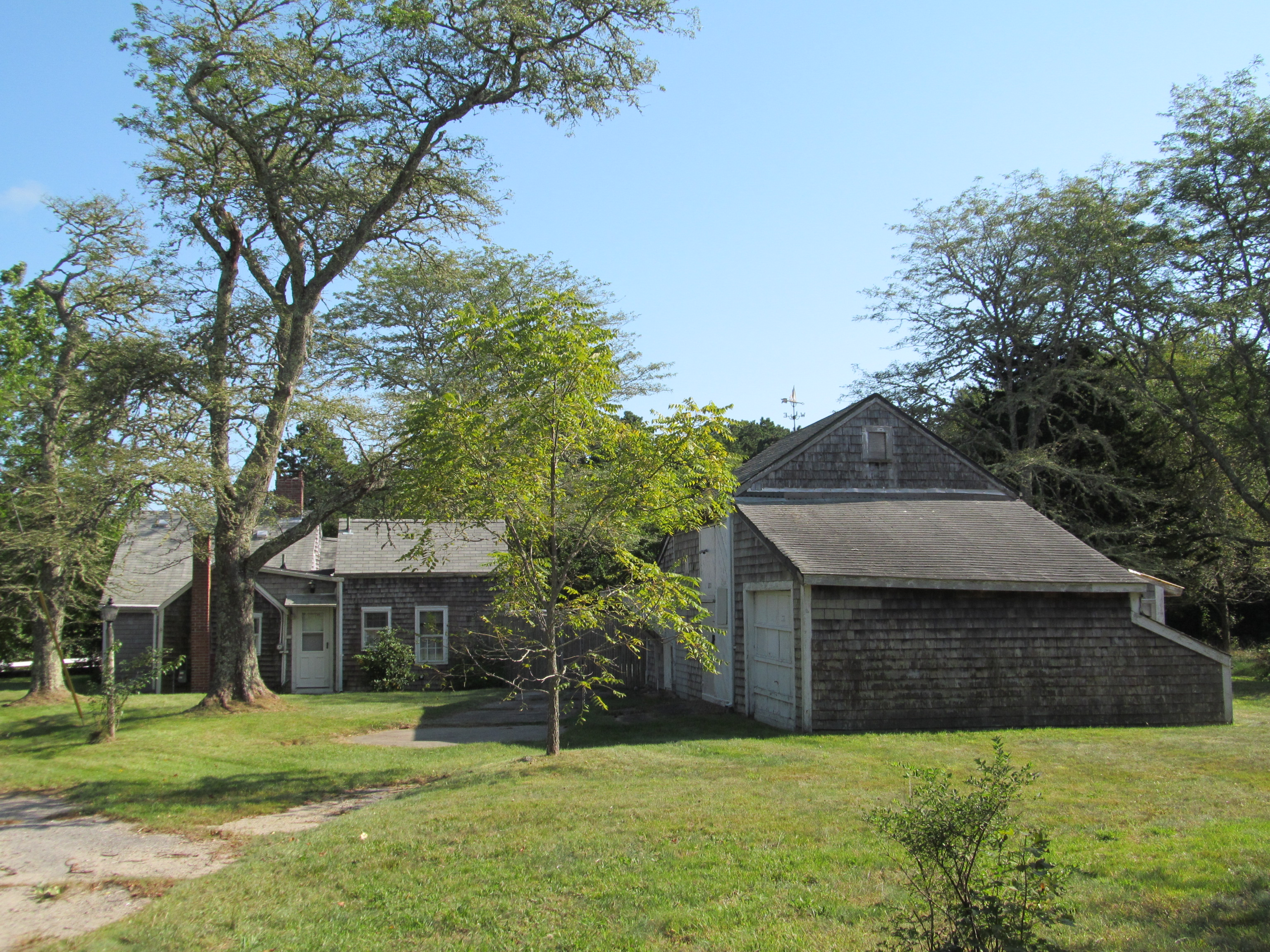
- Goodspeed House

- Location within Cape Cod Location within Massachusetts Location within the United States
- Location: Barnstable, Massachusetts
- Coordinates: 41°39′32″N 70°25′10″W
- Built: c. 1653 (traditional) c. 1708 (assessed)
- MPS: Barnstable MRA
- NRHP reference No.: 87000235
- Added to NRHP: March 13, 1987

The Goodspeed House is a historic house in Barnstable, Massachusetts. It is believed to have been built by Roger Goodspeed, Marstons Mills' first settler. The house was listed on the National Register of Historic Places in 1987.

== Description and history ==
The Goodspeed House is a 1 1/2-story wood-frame structure, five asymmetrical bays in width, with a side-gable roof and central chimney. Exterior trim is minimal, with simple surrounds around the windows, and a lintel shelf above the main entry. An ell extends to the rear of the house toward a barn.

While the house is traditionally claimed to have been built by local settler Roger Goodspeed in 1653, this has since been disputed. The Marstons Mills Historical Society has claimed that the residence is "proven" to have been built before 1708 by Roger's son Ebenezer. The house remained in the hands of Goodspeed's descendants for five generations. Its asymmetrical facade suggests that it was at first built as a "half house", only three bays wide.

== See also ==
- List of the oldest buildings in Massachusetts
- National Register of Historic Places listings in Barnstable County, Massachusetts
