= River Road–Cross Street Historic District =

Historic district in Massachusetts, United States

- U.S. National Register of Historic Places
- U.S. Historic district
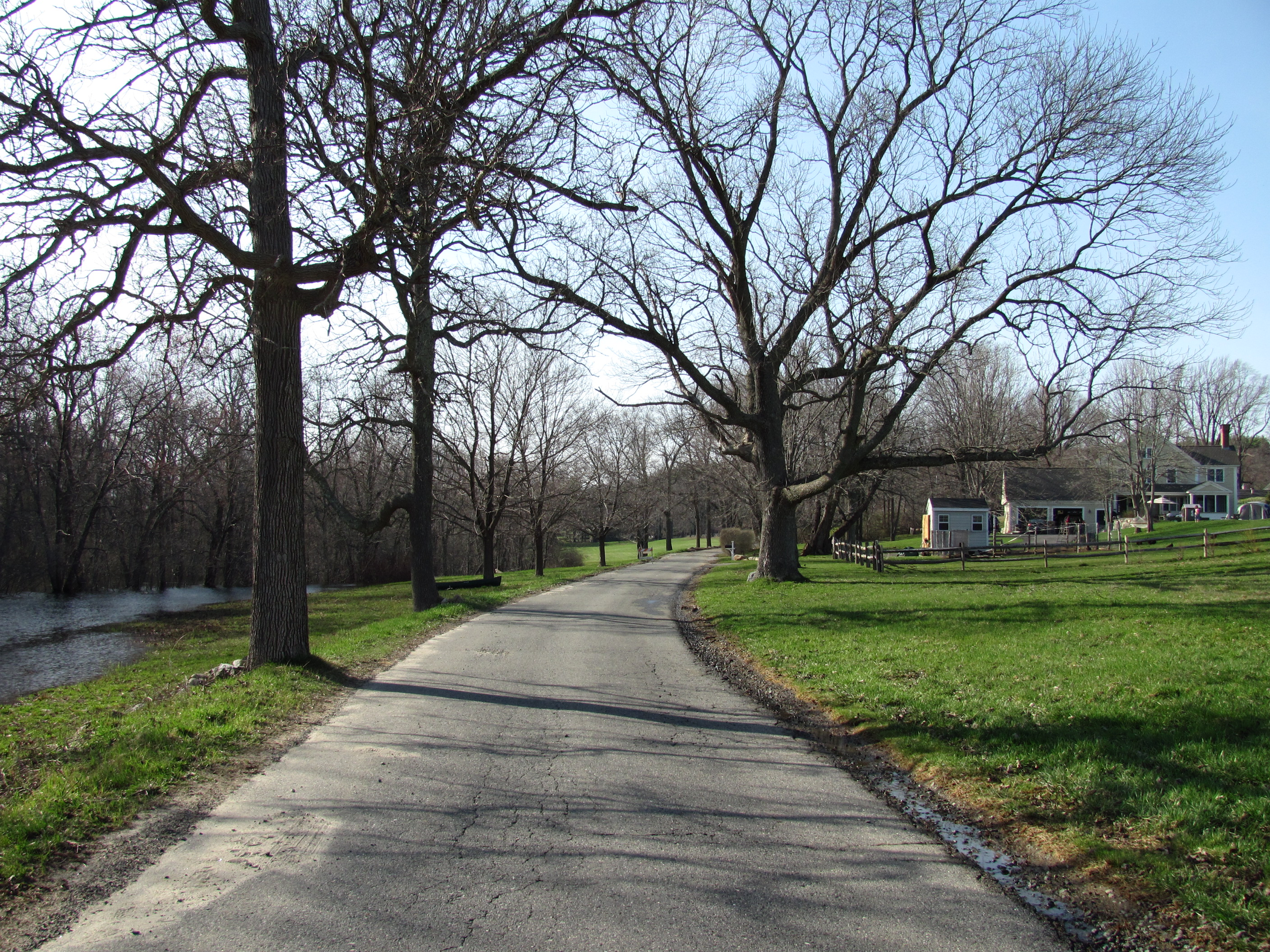
- Looking northwest on River Road

- Location within Massachusetts Location within the United States
- Location: Topsfield, Massachusetts
- Coordinates: 42°37′40″N 70°57′32″W
- Architect: Blosson, Harold H.; Cram, Robert N., et al.
- Architectural style: Colonial, Georgian
- MPS: Farms and Rural Retreats of Topsfield, Massachusetts MPS
- NRHP reference No.: 05000465
- Added to NRHP: May 26, 2005

The River Road–Cross Street Historic District is a rural agricultural historic district in Topsfield, Massachusetts. It is representative of Topsfield's development first as an agricultural community, and later as place for rural retreats. The district, which was listed on the National Register of Historic Places in 2005, is roughly bounded by River Road, Rowley Bridge Road, Cross Street, Hill Street, and Salem Road, and also includes properties facing Prospect Street and Bradstreet Lane. Much of the district was consolidated under the ownership of William Appleton Coolidge in the 20th century, and bequeathed to the Massachusetts Institute of Technology with restrictions to preserve its rural character. MIT sold the donated properties in 2000.

The district includes nineteen properties distributed across 450 acres (180 ha) in a rural landscape that includes open farmlands, historic farmsteads, 19th and 20th century estate houses, and scenic views of the Ipswich River, which runs through the center of the district. Some of these lands have been worked since the early colonial days of Topsfield's history. The oldest houses in the district, the Zaccheus Gould House and the Stanley Lake House, date to the late 17th century, and are separately listed on the National Register. There are also several houses dating to the middle and late 18th century, notably two that were built by John Balch on Hill Street.

The area began a gradual transformation from a strictly agricultural use to that of a rural retreat area as early as 1807, when the Perkins-Pingree House was built at 49 Salem Road. This high Federal style house is one of the finest of its type in Topsfield. Two important large-scale estates in the area are the Meredith Farm (29 and 41 Cross Street) and the Cummings Estate (82 River Road). The Meredith Farm was developed as a rural retreat by Boston developer J. Morris Meredith, who built an Arts and Crafts style estate house on the property, while preserving the historic Daniel Bixby farmstead (built c. 1800). The Cummings Estate was the work of Margaret Cummings, who purchased land that had long been in the hands of the Lake family, early Topsfield settlers, in the early 20th century. Her brother, architect Charles K. Cummings, designed a collection of Tudor Revival buildings for the estate, and it was landscaped to designs by Arthur Shurcliff, who had studied landscape design with the Olmsted Brothers.

== See also ==
- National Register of Historic Places listings in Essex County, Massachusetts
