= John and Priscilla Alden Family Sites =

Historic house in Massachusetts, United States

- U.S. National Register of Historic Places
- U.S. National Historic Landmark
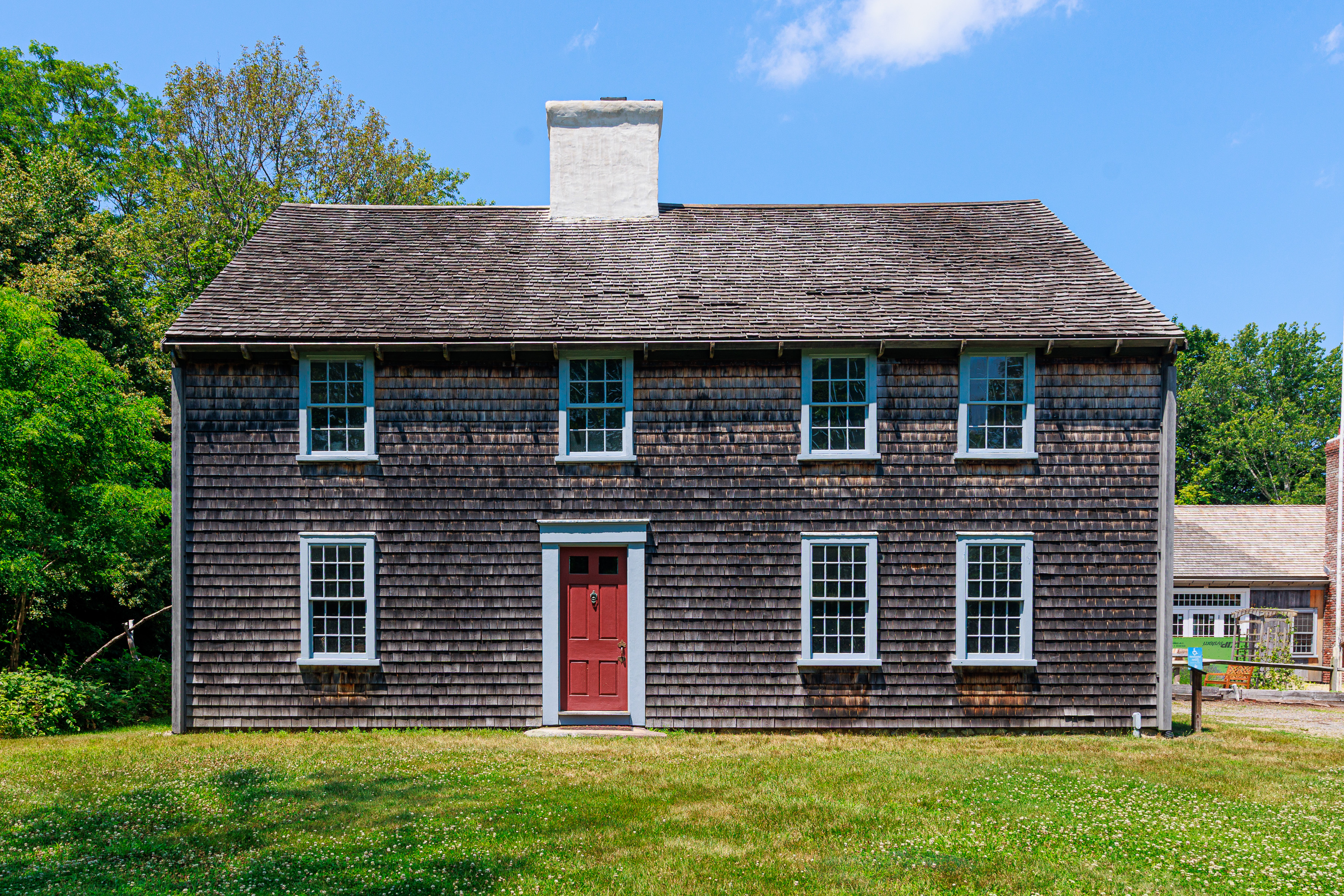
- Alden House Historic Site in 2025

- Location within Massachusetts Location within the United States
- Location: 105 Alden St., Duxbury, Massachusetts
- Coordinates: 42°2′42″N 70°41′9″W
- Area: 2.4 acres (0.97 ha)
- Built: c. 1630 (Original) c. 1700 (Current)
- NRHP reference No.: 78000476

Significant dates
- Added to NRHP: December 14, 1978
- Designated NHL: October 6, 2008

The John and Priscilla Alden Family Sites is a National Historic Landmark consisting of two separate properties in Duxbury, Massachusetts. Both properties are significant for their association with John Alden, one of the settlers of the Plymouth Colony who came to America on board the Mayflower and held numerous posts of importance in the colony. Alden and his relationship with Priscilla Mullins were memorialized by Henry Wadsworth Longfellow in The Courtship of Miles Standish, a fictionalized narrative poem that made the story a piece of American folklore.

One of the two properties contains the archaeological remains of the house that Alden built c. 1630, and is also significant in the field of historical archaeology as the mature field work of Roland W. Robbins (1908–1987), an early historical archaeologist. It is on land owned by the Town of Duxbury. On the second property stands a house which was traditionally dated to c. 1653 as a work by Alden, but it has been judged by forensic analysis to have been built around 1700, probably by Alden's grandson. This property has been under the continuous ownership of the Alden family; it is now managed by a family foundation as a historic house museum.

== Alden Homestead Site ==
The Alden Homestead Site is located on a knoll overlooking the Bluefish River on a parcel of land that is now owned by the Town of Duxbury, and is principally occupied by the Duxbury Junior High School. Wooden posts outline the site of the foundation excavated by Roland Wells Robbins in 1960. A bronze marker is mounted on a granite stone 75 feet (23 m) from the site with the inscription "Site of the John Alden House built 1627". The property is part of a 100-acre (40 ha) parcel granted to John Alden in 1628, and is about 750 feet (230 m) from the Alden House, which abuts the town property.

The site has been of archaeological interest since the 19th century, when historical artifacts were found in the area. The first formal archaeological survey of the area was conducted in the 1950s, but archeologists did not locate the homestead foundation. The Alden Kindred Foundation, owners of the Alden House Historic Site, hired Robbins in 1960 to investigate the area. He located and excavated a granite foundation, 38 by 10.5 feet (11.6 m × 3.2 m) in size, with evidence of a deep cellar hole underneath the western end. He excavated the area within the foundation, including the cellar, and recovered more than 7,000 historical artifacts and 2,000 prehistoric American Indian artifacts. Most of these were nails and other construction materials. A significant number of cultural artifacts provide evidence that the site was last occupied in the 1650s. In consultation with other archaeologists who analyzed the finds, and based on documentary evidence, Robbins assigned the house a construction date of 1632.

New fieldwork and a reinterpretation of Robbins' work by Craig Chartier suggest that the foundation might be an addition to an older 20 by 20 feet (6.1 m × 6.1 m) structure which was earthfast (built on wooden posts set in the ground), a building method known from other Plymouth Colony sites. Chartier concludes that this site was Alden's home for most of his time in Plymouth.

== Alden House Historic Site ==
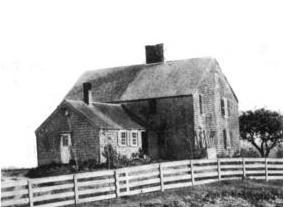
Alden House in 1904

The Alden House Historic Site is a house museum that was home to John and Priscilla Alden, located at 105 Alden Street in Duxbury, Massachusetts. Family tradition held that the house was built in 1653 as the second home of John and Priscilla Alden, although the original building may have been as early as 1630. In 2003, dendrochronological and architectural analysis of the current structure suggests that it was built around 1700, after John and Priscilla were deceased.

Alden was ship's cooper on the Mayflower who arrived in Plymouth Colony in 1620 and later moved to Duxbury. He was not a Pilgrim himself, but he was an important figure throughout the period of the Plymouth Colony. This house may have used materials from Alden's earlier house which was nearby.

== Recognition ==
The sites were listed on the National Register of Historic Places in 1978, and were declared a National Historic Landmark on October 6, 2008.

== See also ==
- List of the oldest buildings in Massachusetts
- List of National Historic Landmarks in Massachusetts
- National Register of Historic Places listings in Plymouth County, Massachusetts

== Gallery ==
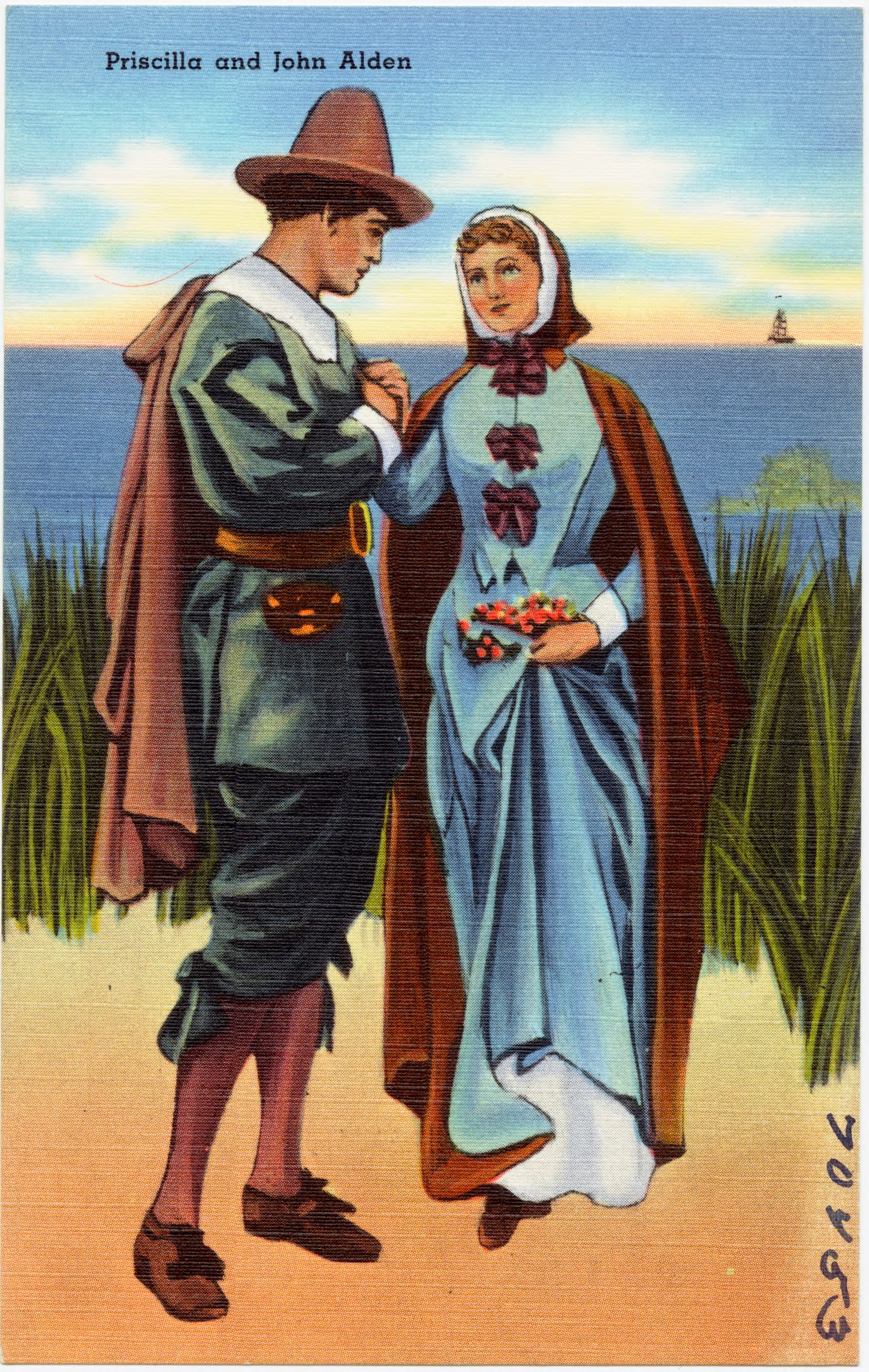
Priscilla and John Alden

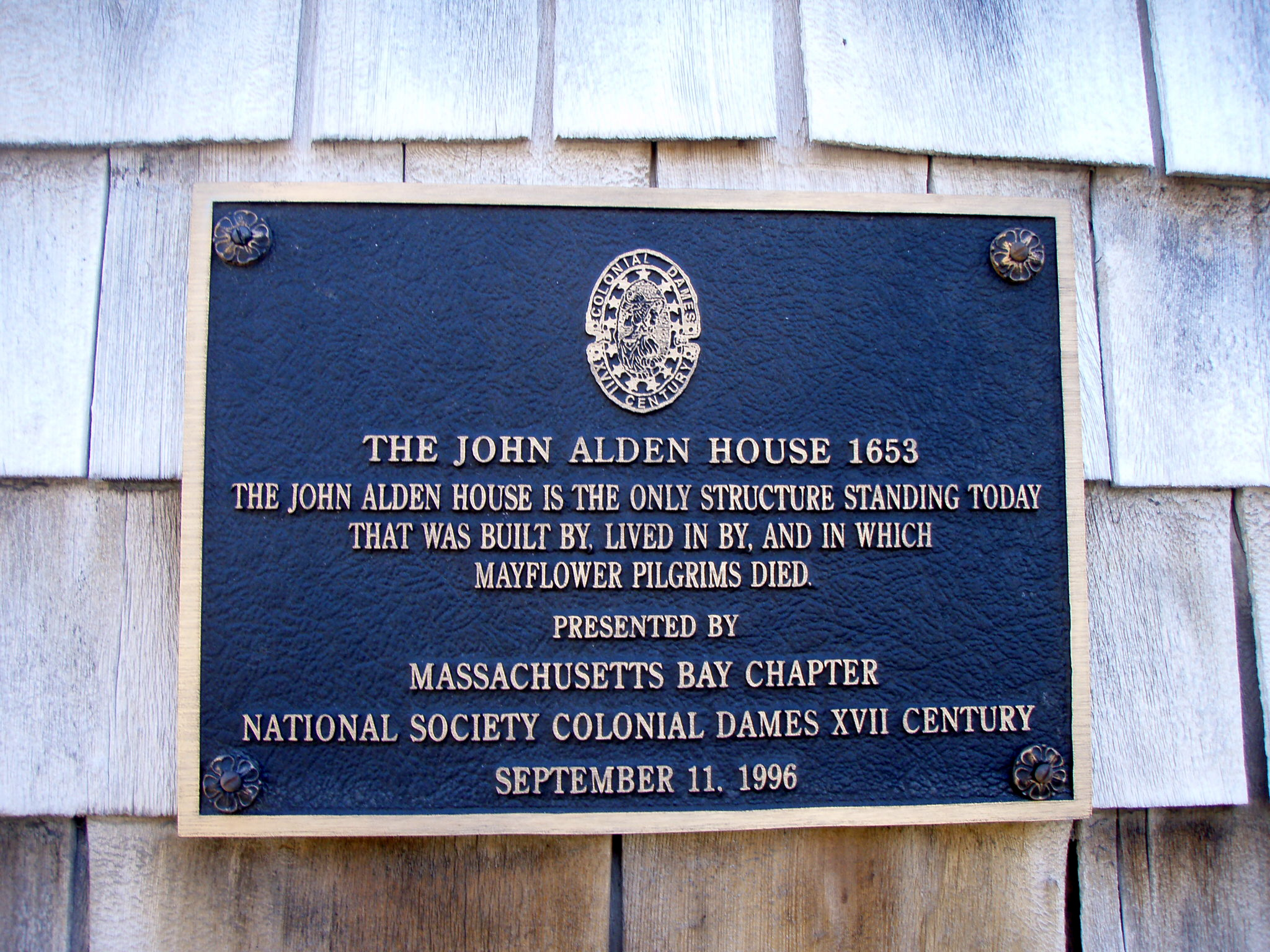
John Alden House historic marker

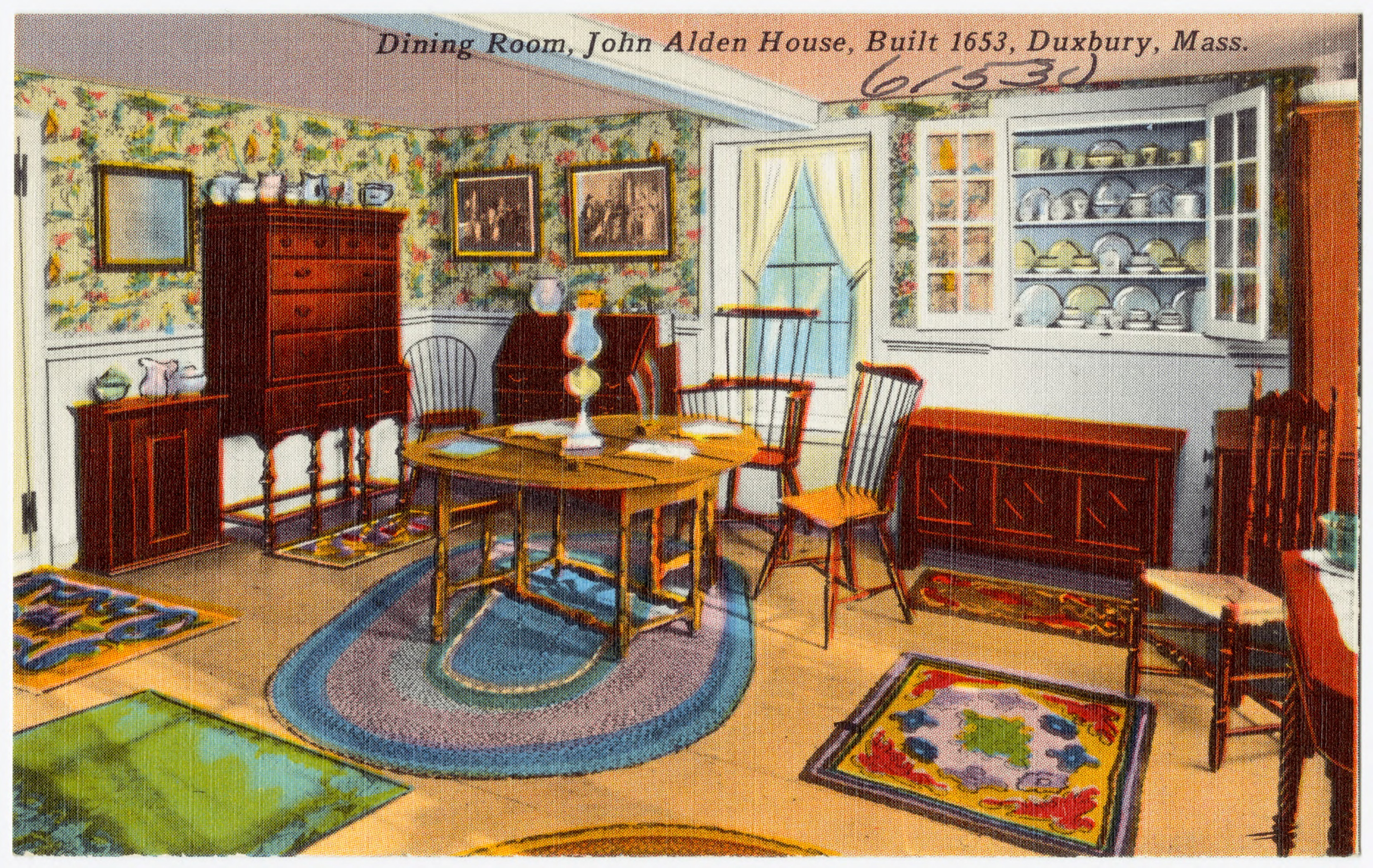
1930s postcard depicting the dining room

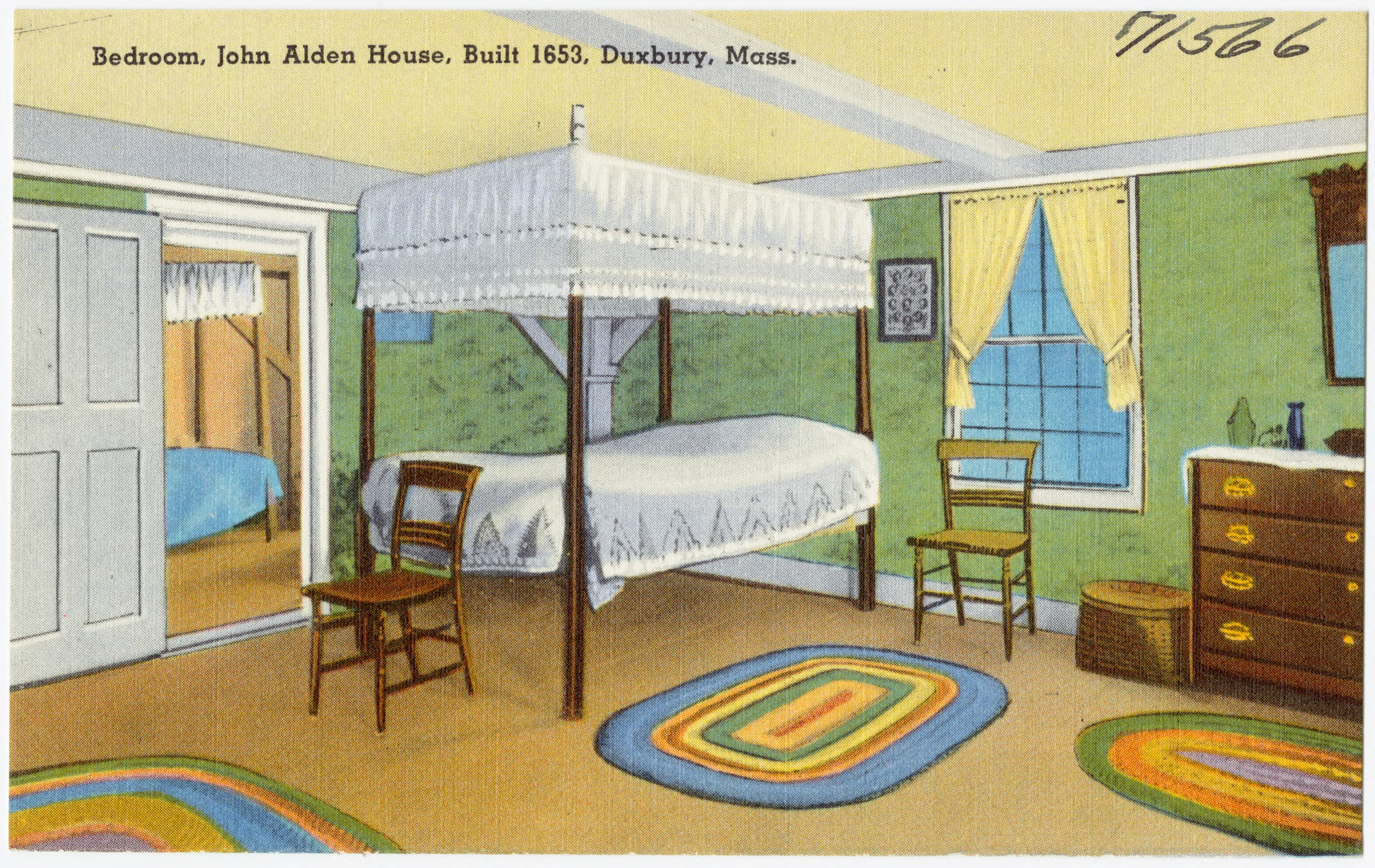
1930s postcard depicting a bedroom
