= Hatch Homestead and Mill Historic District =

Historic district in Massachusetts, United States

- U.S. National Register of Historic Places
- U.S. Historic district
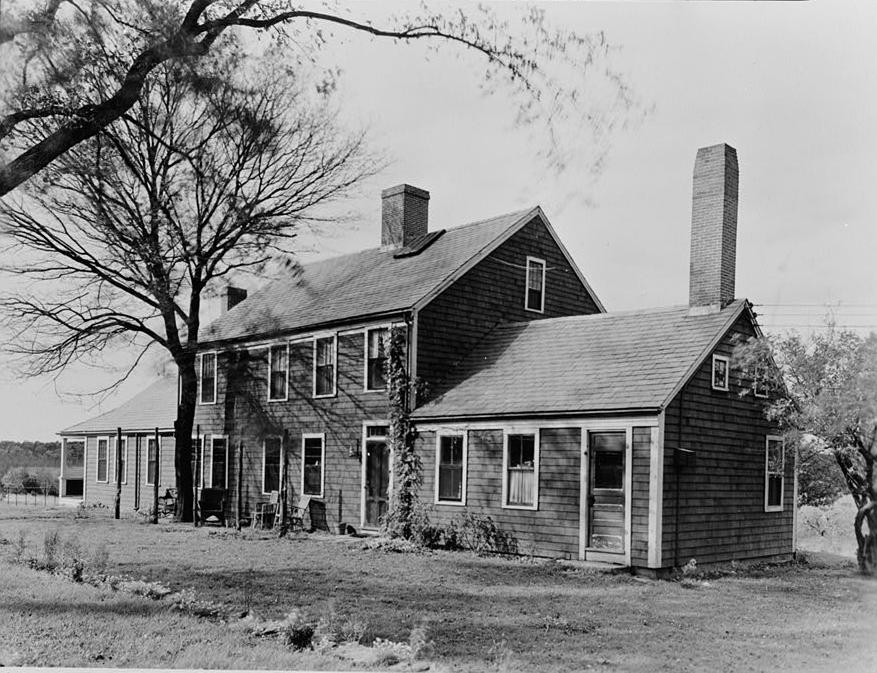

- Location within Massachusetts Location within the United States
- Location: 385 Union St., Marshfield, Massachusetts
- Coordinates: 42°7′21″N 70°46′12″W
- Area: 10 acres (4.0 ha)
- Architectural style: Georgian
- NRHP reference No.: 09000698
- Added to NRHP: September 11, 2009

The Hatch Homestead and Mill Historic District encompasses two properties associated with the locally prominent Hatch family on Union Street in Marshfield, Massachusetts. It includes an early Georgian colonial house (dating to the first half of the 18th century), and a 19th-century water-powered mill, both located on sites that had seen similar use since the 17th century. The district was listed on the National Register of Historic Places in 2009.

== Description and history ==
The Hatch Homestead and Mill are located in northern Marshfield, on the west side of Union Street opposite its junction with Pine Street. Both buildings are set well back from the street. The mill is located down a gravel drive directly opposite Pine Street, while the house is located nearly 1/3 of a mile west of the Union Street, and is now accessed via a drive to the south. To the south of the mill is the site of the mill pond, which was created by damming a stream flowing west to the North River. The house is located on the south side of the stream, at a distance below the dam.

The mill is a roughly T-shaped wood frame structure, with a heavy timber frame on a fieldstone foundation. It houses an original water-powered driveshaft, which was used to drive an up-and-down saw blade. The building has undergone a number of restorative actions, and is (as of 2016) in another phase of restoration by the town.

The house is a 2-1/2 story timber-frame structure, with a gabled roof and central chimney. Single-story wings extend to either side of the main block. Although this house was traditionally given a construction date of c. 1647, architectural analysis indicates the use of 18th-century construction methods in building it. The property was acquired in 1647 by Walter Hatch, who built a house on this property, and was probably responsible for damming the stream and establishing a mill, although none of his buildings are now believed to survive. The house was probably built by Hatch's son or grandson. The Hatch family owned both properties until the 1960s. Author Sarah Messer grew up in the house, and featured the house in her book, Red House: Being a Mostly Accurate Account of New England's Oldest Continuously Lived-In House.

== See also ==
- List of the oldest buildings in Massachusetts
- National Register of Historic Places listings in Plymouth County, Massachusetts
