= Zaccheus Gould House =

Historic house in Massachusetts, United States

- U.S. National Register of Historic Places
- U.S. Historic district – Contributing property
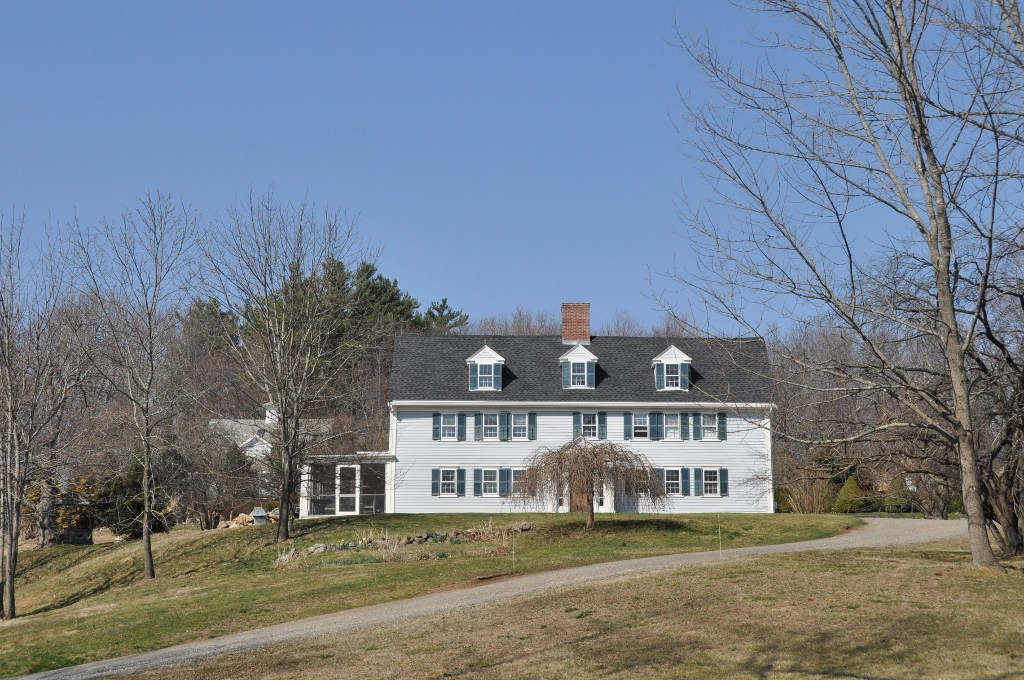

- Location within Massachusetts Location within the United States
- Location: 85 River Road, Topsfield, Massachusetts
- Coordinates: 42°38′0″N 70°57′38″W
- Built: c.1670
- Architectural style: Colonial
- Part of: River Road-Cross Street Historic District (ID05000465)
- MPS: First Period Buildings of Eastern Massachusetts TR
- NRHP reference No.: 90000261

Significant dates
- Added to NRHP: March 9, 1990
- Designated CP: May 26, 2005

The Zaccheus Gould House is a historic First Period house in Topsfield, Massachusetts, United States. The oldest part of the house was built c. 1670, probably for Zaccheus Gould by John Gould, one of the founders of Topsfield. The house is a 2 1/2-story five-bay wood-frame structure. The older portion of the house is on the right of the central chimney; the portion on the left is estimated to have been added c. 1700. The workmanship on the exposed framing elements inside the house suggests that the same workman also worked on the Stephen Foster House.

The house was listed on the National Register of Historic Places in 1990. Because the property was subdivided, it is no longer at its listed address, 73 Prospect Street. The property also contributes to the River Road-Cross Street Historic District, listed in 2005.

== See also ==
- National Register of Historic Places listings in Essex County, Massachusetts
- List of the oldest buildings in Massachusetts
