= Hoar Tavern =

- U.S. National Register of Historic Places
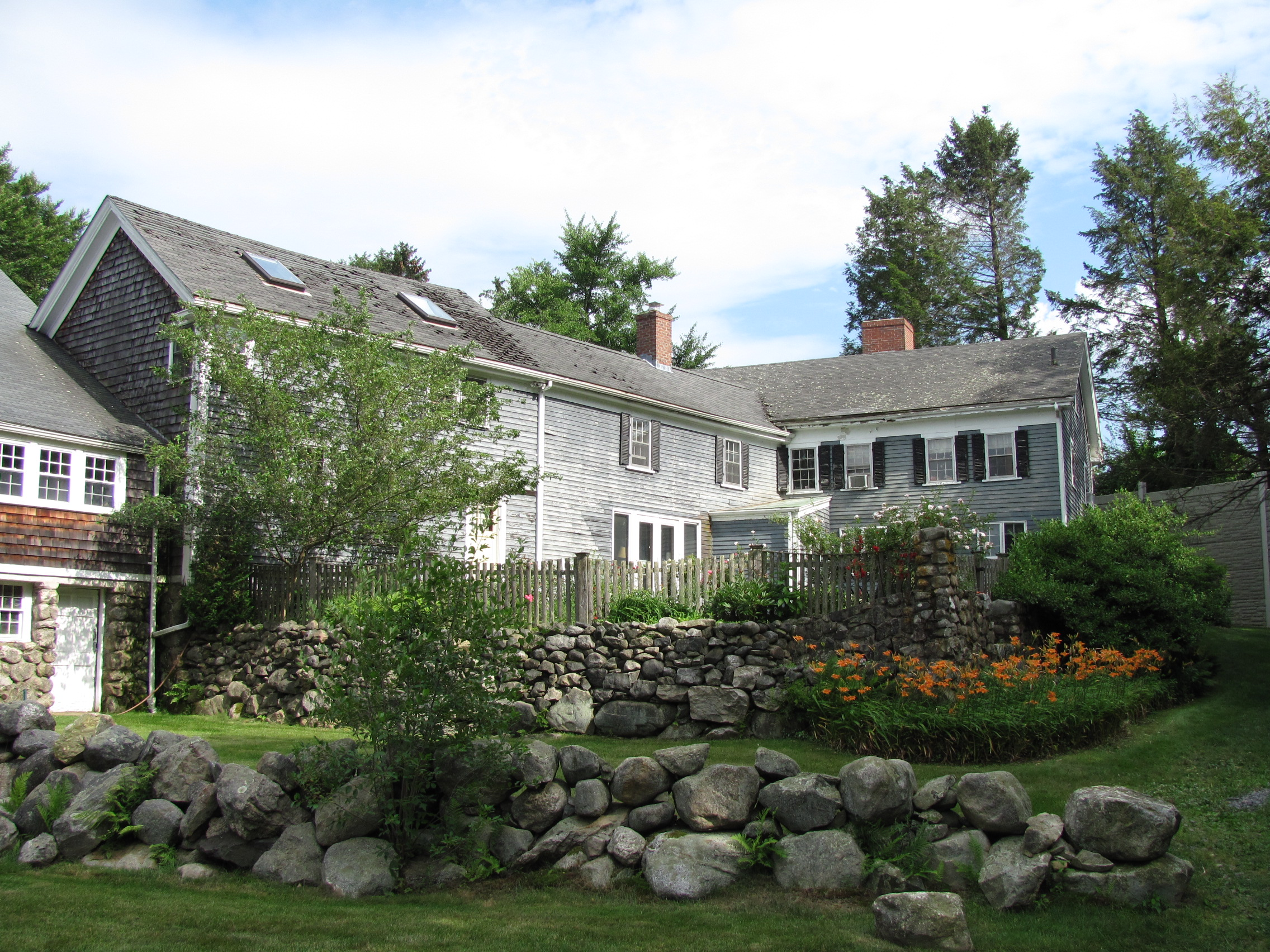
- North view of the Hoar Homestead

- Location within Massachusetts Location within the United States
- Location: 268 Concord Tpke; Lincoln, Massachusetts
- Coordinates: 42°26′8.0″N 71°16′35.9″W
- Area: 2 acres (0.81 ha)
- Built: 1680
- NRHP reference No.: 73000301
- Added to NRHP: July 23, 1973

Hoar Tavern, or the Hoar Homestead, is a historic tavern and house on Reiling Pond Road in Lincoln, Massachusetts. With a construction history dating to 1680, it was for nearly two centuries home to the Hoar family, a prominent legal and political family in Massachusetts. It was listed on the National Register of Historic Places in 1973.

== Description and history ==
The former Hoar Tavern is set close to Massachusetts Route 2 in eastern Lincoln, from which it is now separated by sound barriers and a low stone wall. The tavern property, about 2 acres (0.81 ha), includes the house/tavern and a barn of significant antiquity, the two now joined by an ell. The tavern is a 2 1/2-story wood-frame structure, oriented facing south towards Route 2, which follows the route of the colonial-era Cambridge Turnpike. The main facade is five bays wide, with a projecting entry vestibule at the center. It has a central chimney, and is sheathed in wooden clapboards. The interior includes high-quality 18th-century wood paneling, as well as features indicative of its First Period construction. The barn is a large timber-framed structure, with beams 18 inches (46 cm) thick.

The house was probably built by Daniel Hoar in the 1680s, when the area was still part of Concord. Daniel's son John and grandson Samuel were both active in Lincoln town affairs, and served in the Battles of Lexington and Concord at the outbreak of the American Revolutionary War. Samuel's son (also named Samuel), was a leading attorney in Massachusetts in the first half of the 19th century, and his sons, Ebenezer Rockwood Hoar and George Frisbie Hoar, were both prominent in state and national politics. The property operated for over a century by the Hoars as a tavern, was sold out of the family in 1869.

== See also ==
- List of the oldest buildings in Massachusetts
- National Register of Historic Places listings in Middlesex County, Massachusetts
