= Stanley Lake House =

Historic house in Massachusetts, United States

- U.S. National Register of Historic Places
- U.S. Historic district – Contributing property
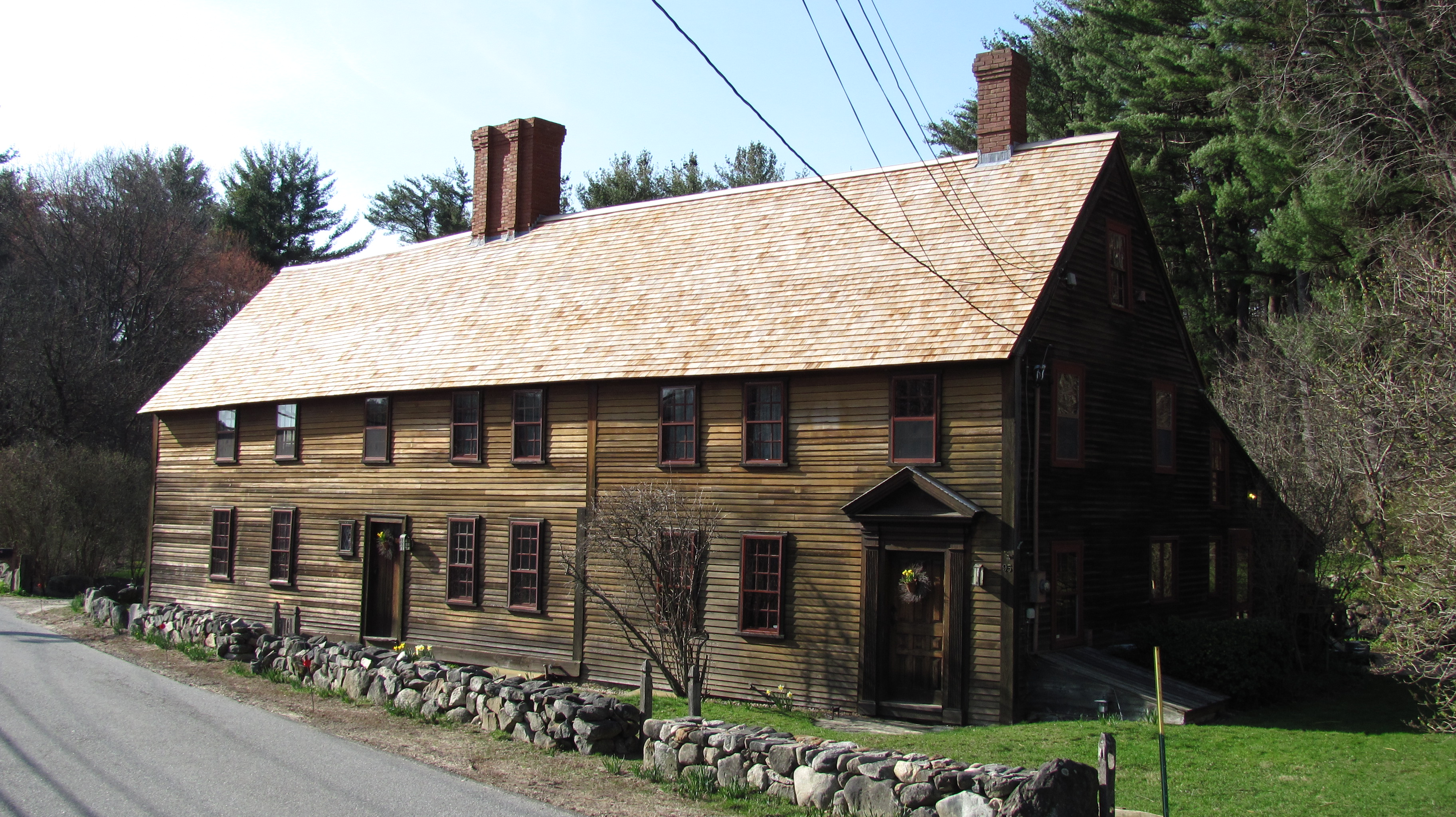
- Stanley Lake House

- Location within Massachusetts Location within the United States
- Location: 95 River Rd., Topsfield, Massachusetts
- Coordinates: 42°38′2″N 70°57′47″W
- Built: 1693
- Architectural style: Colonial
- Part of: River Road-Cross Street Historic District (ID05000465)
- MPS: First Period Buildings of Eastern Massachusetts TR
- NRHP reference No.: 90000260

Significant dates
- Added to NRHP: March 9, 1990
- Designated CP: May 26, 2005

The Stanley Lake House is a historic First Period house in Topsfield, Massachusetts. It is a 2 1/2-story wood-frame house that was built in stages by Mathew Stanley or his heirs between c. 1675 and 1693 and subsequently enlarged by the Lake family. It illustrates a host of building practices over the 17th and 18th centuries. The first Matthew Stanley house was said by Dow to be located northwest of this building. The first portion of this building is the section from the chimney westward. An easterly room was added after and a further addition to the east by the Lakes c. 1750. Matthew Stanley's heirs having removed to the Attleborough Falls area, sold the 70 acre farm property 1710- 1718 to Eleazer Lake. The property also includes a rare First Period barn. It was listed on the National Register of Historic Places in 1990. In 2005 it was named a contributing property to the River Road-Cross Street Historic District.

== Description and history ==
The Stanley Lake House is set on the north side of River Road in a rural section of Topsfield. The road is rural, roughly paralleling the Ipswich River, which runs west-to-east to the south. The house is set close to the road. It is a large 2 1/2-story wood-frame structure, eight bays wide, and a single room deep. A small leanto section extends part of the building to the right rear, and a larger 19th-century addition extends it to the left rear. The facade is asymmetrical, with entrances in the rightmost bay and in the third from the left. The rightmost entrance is more elaborately decorated, with flanking pilasters and a gabled pediment. Brick chimneys rise from the center roughly behind the entrances.

The house was built in several stages over a period of decades, beginning c. 1675–1690, when the leftmost three bays were built. Around 1693 two bays were added to t right, and a leanto section was added further to the right sometime before 1710. About 1710, the leanto was raised to a full two stories in height, adding two bays. The rightmost bay and chimney were added in 1752. Architectural analysis identified the differing construction methods used to build each section and the sequence in which they were constructed. The original builder of the house was perhaps Matthew Stanley, whose heirs sold it in 1710 to Eleazer Lake.

The barn standing on the property is an extremely rare First Period barn, its presence was recorded in a deed transfer in 1718. It is a post-and-beam structure, built using First Period construction techniques, and was originally four bays in size, enlarged to five not many years later.

== See also ==
- National Register of Historic Places listings in Essex County, Massachusetts
