= Capt. John Thorndike House =

Historic house in Massachusetts, United States

- U.S. National Register of Historic Places
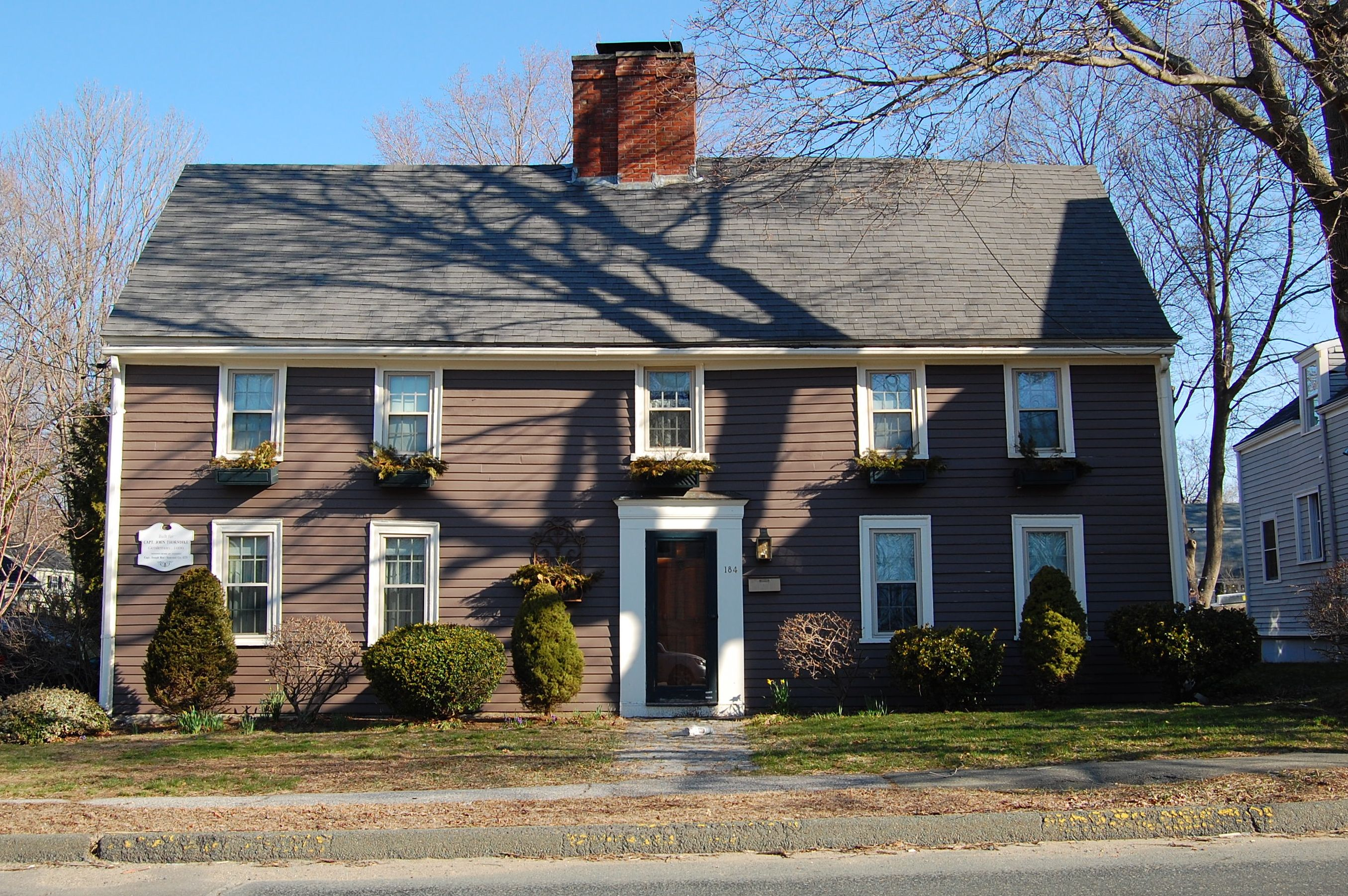
- Captain John Thorndike House

- Location within Massachusetts Location within the United States
- Location: 184 Hale Street, Beverly, Massachusetts
- Coordinates: 42°34′49″N 70°50′23″W
- Built: 1702; 324 years ago
- Architectural style: Colonial
- MPS: First Period Buildings of Eastern Massachusetts TR
- NRHP reference No.: 90000195
- Added to NRHP: March 9, 1990

The Capt. John Thorndike House is a historic First Period house in Beverly, Massachusetts. It is a 2.5-story wood-frame house with a central chimney and a raised leanto section in back. The house, like many First Period houses, was built in several stages. The oldest part, the chimney and the right side, was built as a two-story section with leanto, likely in 1702 (based on the date being carved on one of the framing posts). This particular type of original sections is rare among First Period houses. Later in the first period, the left side of the house was built; it was constructed without a leanto section. The left side leanto was added later in the 18th century, and part of the leanto section was raised by a shed dormer in the 19th century.

The house was added to the National Register of Historic Places in 1990.

== See also ==
- National Register of Historic Places listings in Essex County, Massachusetts
