= Jonathon Keyes Sr. House =

Historic house in Massachusetts, United States

- U.S. National Register of Historic Places
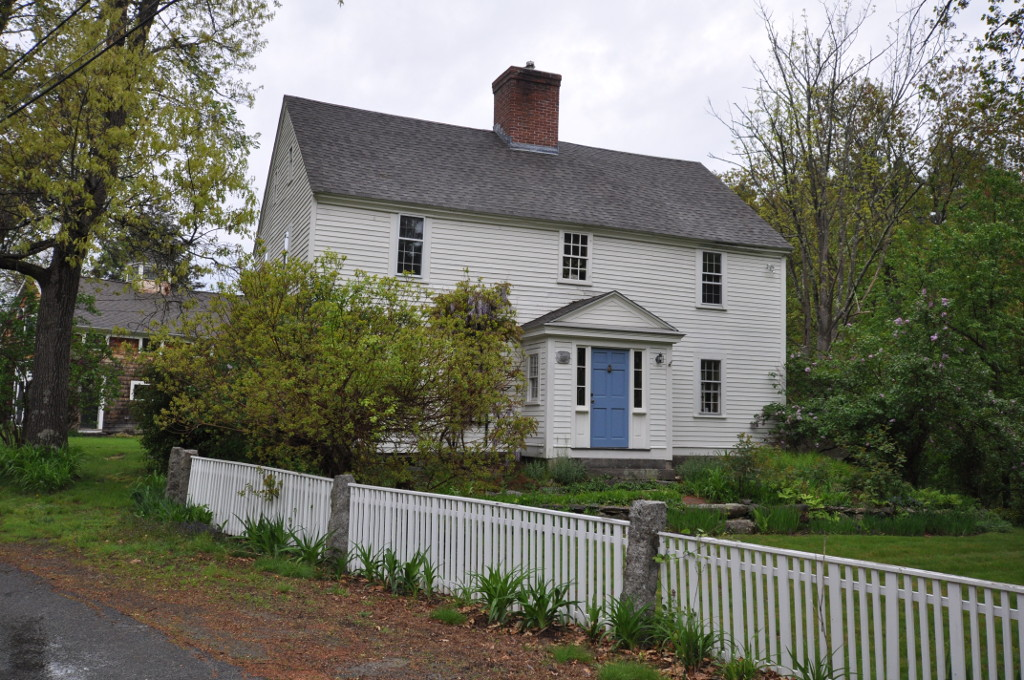

- Location within Massachusetts Location within the United States
- Location: 16 Frances Hill Rd., Westford, Massachusetts
- Coordinates: 42°36′10″N 71°24′17″W
- Built: c. 1750
- Architectural style: Georgian
- NRHP reference No.: 100004051
- Added to NRHP: December 3, 2019

The Jonathon Keyes Sr. House, also known incorrectly in town histories as the Solomon Keyes House, is a historic house at 16 Frances Hill Road in Westford, Massachusetts. It was probably built in the mid-18th century, and is one of the town's oldest surviving buildings. It was listed on the National Register of Historic Places in 2019.

== Description and history ==
The Jonathon Keyes Sr. House is located in a residential setting in eastern Westford, on the east side of Frances Hill Road just north of Hunt Road. It is a 2 1/2-story timber-frame structure, with a gabled roof and clapboarded exterior. A large brick chimney rises from the center of the roof. The main facade is three bays wide, with sash windows arranged symmetrically around the main entrance. The second-floor windows are butted against the roof eave, a common Georgian feature. The main entrance is sheltered by a projecting gable-roofed vestibule. The building's interior follows a typical central-chimney plan, with the entry vestibule that has a narrow winding stair in front of the chimney. Most of the building's styling is Federal, but construction features such as gunstock posts indicate an earlier (17th or early 18th century) construction date.

For many years, local historians believed this house to be the work of Solomon Keyes (d. 1702), one of Westford's early settlers. However, its accessible construction elements show no evidence of First Period construction, suggesting it was built by one of his descendants. The building is definitely mentioned in a late 18th-century deed. It was originally built as a saltbox colonial, but its rear leanto section was raised to a full two stories, most likely in the late 18th century. The house was sold out of the Keyes family in 1898.

== See also ==
- National Register of Historic Places listings in Middlesex County, Massachusetts
