= Old Garrison House =

Historic house in Massachusetts, United States

- U.S. National Register of Historic Places
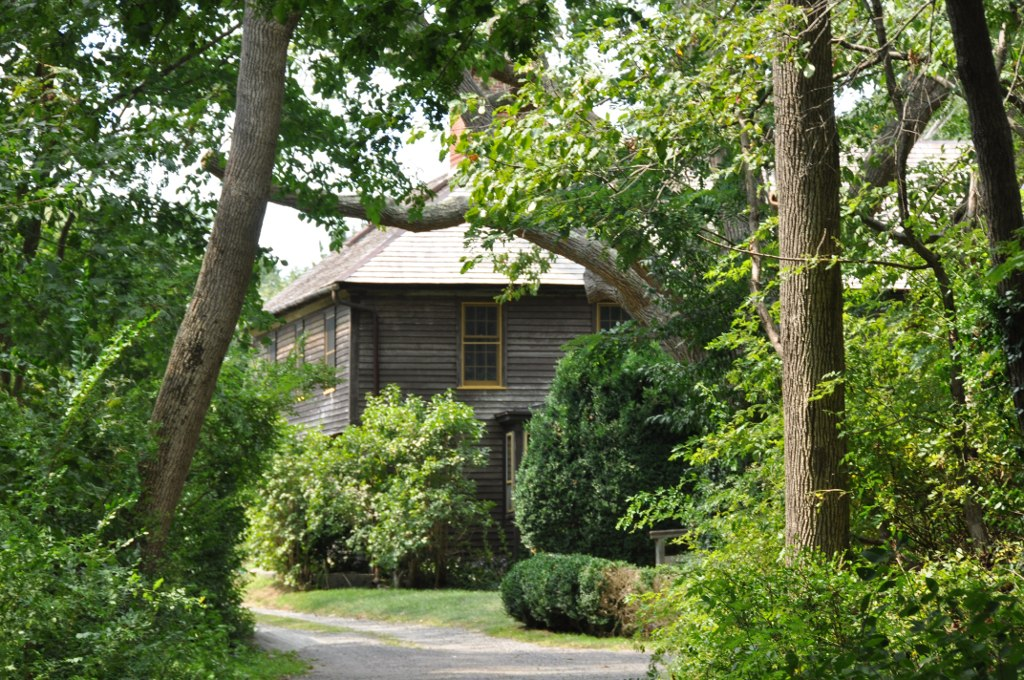

- Location within Massachusetts Location within the United States
- Location: 188 Granite Street, Rockport, Massachusetts
- Coordinates: 42°40′51″N 70°37′41″W
- Built: 1711
- Architectural style: Colonial
- MPS: First Period Buildings of Eastern Massachusetts TR
- NRHP reference No.: 90000254
- Added to NRHP: March 4, 1991

The Old Garrison House is a First Period house in Rockport, Massachusetts, which has been dated through dendrochronology to at least 1711. This house is primarily constructed of tamarack (aka "eastern larch") logs. An ell was added onto the rear of the house in the late 18th century, and a shed-like wing was added to the west rear in the 19th century. Later in the 19th century a single story kitchen wing was added onto the ell.

Dating the house through dendrochronology was only able to produce one usable core sample which was extracted from a log to the left-hand end of the building. Efforts to obtain more samples for dates were unsuccessful due to where the logs are placed and their condition. Local histories suggest that the house may in fact be older than attested. Possibilities include the house being built as early as 1675, and at one point belonging to Elizabeth Proctor. The latter of the two is better known today as having been accused in the Salem witch trials. The house was listed on the National Register of Historic Places in 1991.

== See also ==
- National Register of Historic Places listings in Essex County, Massachusetts
