= Old Stockbridge Grist Mill =

Coordinates: 42°10′39″N 70°44′58″W

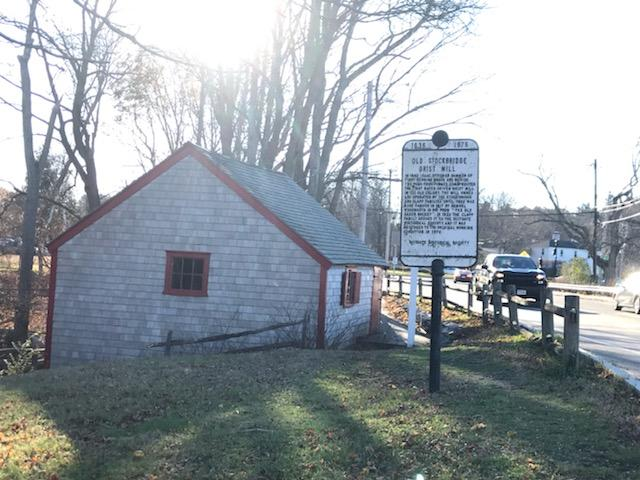
Old Stockbridge Grist Mill in 2020

Old Stockbridge Grist Mill is a historic grist mill on Country Way in Scituate, Massachusetts. It is one of the oldest surviving mills in the United States.

Between 1637 and 1640, the First Herring Brook was dammed by Isaac Stedman for creation of a sawmill. In 1650, John Stockbridge built next to the sawmill a grist mill that longstanding tradition claimed was the present building, but this is not the case.. An assessment of the structure by mill restoration specialist Andrew Shrake demonstrated that the majority of the early structural framing of the building dates to the early 19th century and that the power system is an 1804 patented turbine installed in 1816. The 19th-century mill was used by the Stockbridge and Clapp families to grind cornmeal for sale until 1922, when the Scituate Historical Society purchased the property. Much of the original mill grinding equipment still survives within the mill.
