= Captain Robert Haskell House =

Historic house in Massachusetts, United States

- U.S. National Register of Historic Places
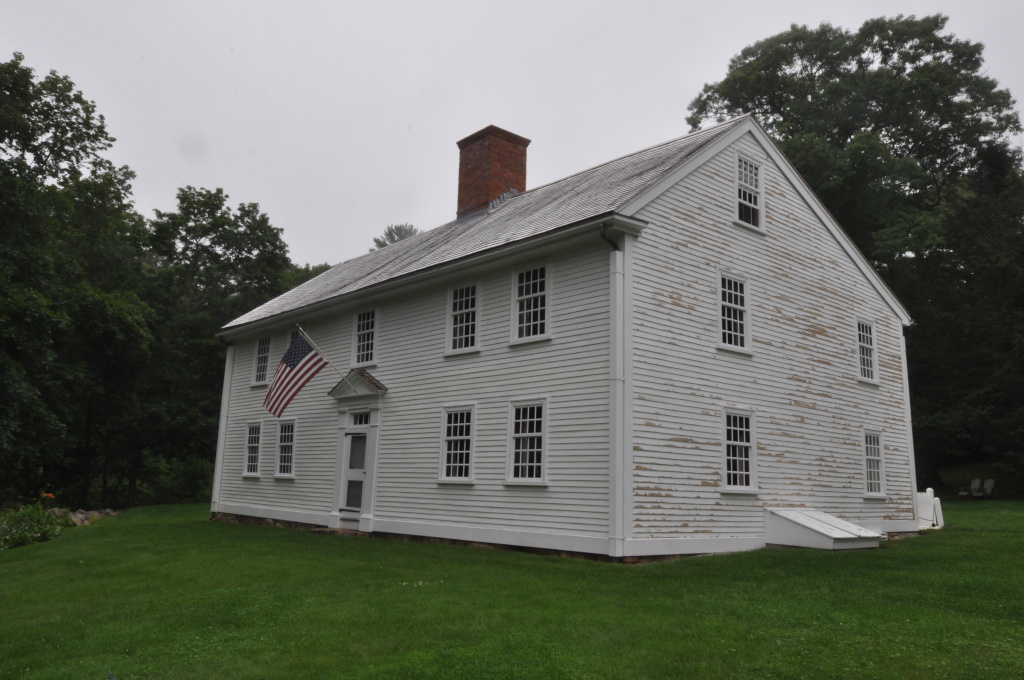

- Location within Massachusetts Location within the United States
- Location: 680 Hale St; Beverly, Massachusetts
- Coordinates: 42°33′42″N 70°49′02″W
- Area: less than one acre
- Built: c. 1713
- NRHP reference No.: 100006593
- Added to NRHP: July 25, 2022

The Captain Robert Haskell House is a First Period house at 680 Hale Street in the Beverly Farms area of Beverly, Massachusetts. Built ca. 1713, the house has a long evolutionary history of alterations that has been extensively documented. Occupied by many generations of Haskells, its long-time division into two parts sheds a light on family living relations of the 18th and 19th centuries. The house was listed on the National Register of Historic Places in 2022.

== Description and history ==
The Haskell House stands in a largely suburban residential setting, on the north side of Hale Street (Massachusetts Route 127 in Beverly's eastern Beverly Farms area. It is set at an angle, back from the road, overlooking a nearby stream. It is a symmetrical 2-1/2 story wood-frame structure, with a gabled roof, clapboarded exterior, and large central chimney. The interior of the house has features from a wide variety of construction periods, documenting a long evolutionary history of alteration.

Early local historians thought the house might date to as early as the 1680s, when land in the area was given to William Haskell. Dendrochronological analysis indicates that the oldest portions of the house, its right three bays, date to 1713. This section was probably built by Haskell's son Robert. Around 1765, the western two bays of the house were added, apparently by conjoining another structure onto the original. At this time the house had a classic saltbox appearance, its rear roofline sloping to the top of the first floor. After Robert Haskell's death in 1776, the house was divided between two of his sons, and their families, descendants, and sometimes tenants, occupied separate portions of the house for the next century. Early in this period, a "Beverly jog" was added to the left side of the house.

In the late 19th century, the house was purchased by F. Gordon Dexter, whose family had a summer estate nearby. He and his descendants engaged in extensive alterations, including removal of the Beverly jog, and raising the rear roof slope to make more room on the second floor. In 1941, the house was acquired by the Beveridge family, owners of another nearby estate, who used it as a caretaker's residence into the 1970s. The house has since undergone extensive restoration.

== See also ==
- National Register of Historic Places listings in Essex County, Massachusetts
