= First Period houses in Massachusetts (1620–1659) =

This article attempts to list the oldest houses built in the Commonwealth of Massachusetts, United States from settlement to 1659. The first immigrant houses built in the Plymouth and Massachusetts Bay colony are known as first generation structures. These were built upon settlement (1620) until about 1660 "when the first immigrant generation of preponderantly younger settlers had come to full maturity". While dozens of existing homes are thought to have been built before 1660, proving their age scientifically is another matter. Just one example built during this time period known as the Fairbanks House has been proven through dendrochronology. The rest of the examples are approximate (indicated with a "circa" or "c.") and based on architectural studies and historical records. Its estimated that only five houses in total have been documented enough to firmly establish they were built during this time period. Only First Period houses built prior to 1660 are suitable for inclusion on this list as construction methods changed circa 1660. All entries should include citation with reference to: 17th century architectural features; a report by an architectural historian; or dendrochronology whenever possible.

== Legend ==
Verified date using dendrochronology or some other type of architectural survey.
Estimated date.
House has been heavily modified per references used.

== List of houses ==
Building	Image	Location	First built	Short summary
Williams–Barker House		Scituate	c.1634	The core of the Williams–Barker House is believed to date from as early 1634. There is no way to tell for sure as no dendrochronology survey has been conducted on the house. The residence has been extensively renovated, and now operates as a tavern.
Austin Crombie House		Manchester	c.1635	It is claimed in the book Manchester by the Sea (1945) that this home was moved from a nearby spot to its current location. Although the Austin Crombie House is believed to date to around 1635, no dendrochronology survey has been conducted. Logs were allegedly clapboarded over when the house was moved, a front room was added, and the roof has since been altered.
Thomas Bourne House		Marshfield	c.1637	Thomas Bourne allegedly built a house sometime in 1637 for his wife Elizabeth. Several rear ells were added during the 19th century, and an exteror chimney added to the side of the house dates to c.1970 The exact build date for this house can not be confirmed as no dendrochronology survey has been conducted on the structure.
Col. John Barstow House		Hanover	c.1640	Parts of the John Barstow House are believed to date from 1640. An addition along with renovations were later added by the original family in the 1790s to accommodate their growth. The John Barstow House is now a private residence.
Joseph Andrews–Perez Lincoln House		Chatham	c.1640	The Joseph Andrews–Perez Lincoln House is believed to have been built around 1640 as a garrison. It was originally owned by Joseph Andrews, who passed the house on to his son Thomas in 1665. These dates are approximate as no dendrochronology survey has been conducted on the home.
Richard Sparrow House	Richard Sparrow House	Plymouth	c.1640	The Richard Sparrow House is allegedly (Note: The title of "Oldest surviving house in Plymouth Massachusetts" could also be given to the Samuel Lucius-Thomas Howland House (also c 1640). Its impossible to know for sure as no dendrochronology surveys have been conducted for these two structures.) the oldest surviving house in Plymouth having been built around 1640. Renovations were last done on the house in 1934 and the Richard Sparrow House now operates as a museum. No dendrochronology survey has been conducted on the house, leaving the original build date as an estimate.
Samuel Lucius–Thomas Howland House		Plymouth	c.1640	Thomas Howland is believed to have completed this house sometime in 1640. He eventually transferred his property to Samuel Lucas in 1697, who sold it to the Jackson and Russell families. the latter of these owned the property throughout the nineteenth and early twentieth centuries until 1939. No dendrochronology survey has been conducted on the home which is now a private residence.
Capt. Thomas Willett House		Kingston	c.1640	The current back ell of the Thomas Willett house is estimated to date from 1640. An attachment to the original structure in the form of a saltbox was later added around 1700. The hose passed through several owners over the years and last received a restoration in 1946. No dendrochronology survey has been conducted on the home.
Fairbanks House		Dedham	1641	The Fairbanks House is the oldest verified wood-frame house in North America after timbers were dated from 1637 to 1641 using dendrochronology. This home is largely preserved in its original state with the central complex being the oldest. Later additions (including wings, and lean-tos on the original structure) were added after 1800 as the family's descendants grew in numbers.
Edmond Hunt House		Duxbury	c.1641	This residence is also known as the Edwin Hunt House, the Edmond Hawes-Barker Hunt House, and the Barker Hunt House. It is believed to date to around 1641 which would make it one of the oldest houses in Duxbury. The interiors of the house were eventually stripped bare sometime around 1906 when it used for storage space. Restorations were undertaken in 1962 to make the structure appear as it had been when first constructed. It now serves as a private summer home.
Wing Fort House		East Sandwich	c.1641	The Wing Fort House is the oldest home in New England continuously owned and occupied by the same family. Descendants of the original owner Stephen Wing continued to live in the home until 1942, when the last resident sold it to the Wing Family of America, Inc. Dendrochronological dating was attempted in 2007, but was unsuccessful due to "many of the samples having too many narrow rings, some having too few rings, and to the lack of reference chronologies from the south-eastern part of Massachusetts."
John Doane House		Kingston	c.1644	Deacon John Doane allegedly built this house sometime in 1644. Not much is known about the residence other than the builder, and the lack of a dendrochronology survey to confirm the build date.
Sturgis Library		Barnstable	c.1644	The oldest portion of Sturgis Library was built c.1644 as a house for Reverend John Lothropp, who was the founder of Barnstable. Later alterations include: a west room addition, work on lengthening the front posts, and raising the front and rear up to two full stories. The house is now named after the birthplace of Boston merchant William Sturgis, who was able to buy back his ancestral home before his death in 1863. Sturgis left his house to the village of Barnstable as a Library which had its original house portion converted when opening in 1867.
James Noyes House		Newbury	c.1646	Reverend James Noyes was one of the founders of Newbury, and built his house there sometime in 1646. His descendants continued to occupy the home until January 26, 1895, when the last original family owner died. The home was given an update sometime in 1729, 1800, and in 1880 when the size of the chimney was reduced. Its most recent renovations occurred in 2020, and the house was sold the following year as a private residence.
Shatswell Planters Cottage	—N/a	Ipswich	c.1646	The Shatswell Planters Cottage is believed to date to around 1646 based on John Satchwell's will. It was later moved to Strawberry Hill on Jeffreys Neck Road sometime in the 1940s. Daniel Wendel acquired the home in 1956 after he saw that it was being used as a garage and workshop that was to be demolished. Over time the varied uses of the cottage destroyed some of the original framing used to determine its initial size and form. The house was restored by Wendel and now is owned by The Trust for Public Land.
John Ellis House		Sandwich	c.1647	Its estimated that the John Ellis House was built sometime around 1647. Not much is known about the residence other than the dimensions of the it, the builder, and the lack of a dendrochronology survey to confirm a build date.
General Israel Putnam House		Danvers	c.1648	This house was originally built by Thomas Putnam around 1648, and is named after his grandson Israel Putnam. In its later history the residence was operated a shoe-making shop by Daniel Putnam in the 1850s. The Putnam family transferred ownership of the residence to the Danvers Historical Society in 1991, but as of 2020 the family once again owns the property.
Bicknell House		Weymouth	c.1650	John Bicknell is believed to have built this house sometime around 1650. The house then passed in ownership to John's son who is believed to have added the eastern portion of the house in 1730. At some point in the late 1890s the house was moved to a new stone foundation, and was modernized/remodeled with an ell added to the rear. The Bicknell family ceased ownership of the house in 1937, and it was converted into a duplex. During this time heaters replaced the fireplaces along with the installation of modern conveniences.
Edward Brown House		Ipswich	c.1650	The Edward Brown House was originally built sometime around 1650, and now contains both 17th and 18th century elements. Originally the structure was a one-room-over-one-room floor plan on the current eastern portion of the house. The western portion of the house was built on sometime in the mid-18th century based on its architectural elements. This addition gave the home its central chimney and a lean-to was added later on. The Edward Brown House is currently a historically protected private residence.
Edward Wilder House		Hingham	c.1650	Originally, the Edward Wilder House had a saltbox structure when it was built sometime around 1650. The house has since been enlarged several times due to the original owner's growing family. This house later had its roof raised in 1904, which gave the chimney an unusual position as it was not moved.
Elisha Leavitt House	N/A	Hingham	c.1650	The original Eastern core portion of this house was built sometime in the mid-seventeenth century by persons unknown. It has since been greatly altered as the now hidden original features has an "envelope" of another century. The second section was built in the mid-eighteenth century which probably absorbed two properties into one. During this time the house was owned by Elisha Leavitt (his second home) until his death in 1790. The house has passed through several owners since then and remains a private residence.
Ford House		Marshfield	c.1650	Its estimated that the Ford House was built sometime around 1650. Several rear addition ells were added to the original structure sometime in the 19th century. More recent additions include a modern main entry enclosure, which was added sometime in the mid-20th century. There is no dendrochronology survey to scientifically confirm a build date to the 17th century for the Ford House.
Samuel Robinson-Michael Chapleman House		Salem	c.1650	This house was built by Samuel Robinson sometime in 1650, he later sold it to seaman Michael Chapleman in 1669 giving the house its namesake. While the southern end of the house is believed to be original this structure has been rendered indistinguishable due to modern additions.
John Chenery House		Belmont	c.1654	The John Chenery House is estimated to have been built around 1654 and has since been remodeled. Architecture on the exteriors of the house now date to the 1850s to 1870's as the home was lived in and updated. Two gabled dormers were added, and the house received a simple Italianate manner. The John Chenery House remained in the family until 1971.
Thomas Scruggs House (Note: This is also referred to as the "Thomas Scruggs-John Raymond House".)	—N/a	Beverly	c.1654	This house was built by Thomas Scruggs sometime in the mid-seventeenth century. The year c.1654 is given for when the house passed down to his son-in-law, John Rayment. Either Scruggs or Rayment built the oldest portion which now makes up the eastern end of the house. The original western end was used as a kitchen and was later removed to become a carriage house. This was eventually replaced by the current western end at an unknown date.
Retire Beckett House		Salem	c.1655	The Retire Beckett House was completed by shipbuilder John Beckett sometime around 1655. Its namesake though comes from one of John's descendants; Retire Becket (c. 1754 – May 29, 1831) who is more well known. Over time the house is reputed to have been doubled in width, a central chimney was eventually added, and the rear lean-to was attached in 1682. The residence was moved to its present location at the House of Seven Gables in 1924 to save it from demolition. It now serves as the museum's gift shop with remnants of 18th century paneling inside.
Thomas Dane House		Concord	c.1657	The first known deed for the Thomas Dane House is from 1657 for "the house barn and land" that the previous owner had bought in 1653. If this is accurate then it would mean that the house was built sometime before 1657. The house was allegedly expanded to the east in 1810 which lengthened it to the present six bays. Windows present on the east side of the house have architectural features which date them between 1740 and 1820. The home is now still a private residence with repairs last being done in the 1990s.
James Moulton House		Wenham	c.1658	This house was built sometime around 1658 by James Moulton at the base of a hill. Alterations to the home appear to have been made between 1750 and 1760 as the present chimney base is constructed of brick in the form of an arch. The rooms on the south side of the chimney have also been remodeled on the first and second floors. Later alterations include a kitchen ell which was added about 1860–1870, and a side porch in the twentieth century.
Newman–Fiske–Dodge House		Wenham	c.1658	The Newman–Fiske–Dodge House is named after Antipas Newman, who is believed to have built the residence sometime around 1858. Later on the house passed to William Fiske, Jr., who was a jury member in the Salem witch trials. The right exterior portion of the house is the original single cell structure. On the left side is a more modern cell which was sometime in 1695 or 1696 to form the saltbox structure. A lean-to and additional wings were added to the house during and after the 18th century. The home's interior still contains some First Period elements from large original beams, to the front staircase trim.
Caleb Moody House		West Newbury	c.1658	Caleb Moody I (1637–1698) built this house sometime around 1659. Original portions of the structure are found at the south end of the house, bracketed by the chimneys. Eight additional rooms were added to the house in 1773 that extend eastward from the north end of the original block. The house remained in the Moody family until the early 20th century when it was occupied by tenants. Single families were once again occupying the house by 1937, and today the residence is privately owned.
Dillingham House		Sandwich	c.1659	This house was built by Simeon Dillingham (son of Edward Dillingham) sometime around 1659. As a caveat, an earlier date of 1650 which was previously cited by the S.H.C. is also still mentioned among sources. Eventually, the house passed down to a descendant named "Branch" in the early 19th century. The town's archive states that Branch later took his own life in 1813. Allegedly, his wife died within three weeks due to mysterious causes which left their 9 children orphaned. At some point in time in the late 19th century, the house was moved from Tupper Road to Main Street and was raised to its present two-story size. The house remained in the Dillingham family until 1926 and has had multiple owners since.
Parkman Tavern		Concord	c.1659	The Parkman Tavern was built by George Wheeler sometime around 1659. This residence gets its namesake from William Parkman, great-uncle to historian Francis Parkman, who operated a tavern on the premises in the late 18th century. The Parkman Tavern is originally thought to have been a one room deep house that was enlarged in the late 18th century to its present form. At some point the roof and windows were altered, and the rear wing of the house was added c. 1900. This house still contains a lot of wood from the original structure along with pieces up to 1820.
Philip Call House		Ipswich	c.1659	The Philip Call House was built by cordwainer Philip Call around 1659, and was later enlarged around 1725. Various architectural periods can be found in this house that span over four generations. The original 2 and a half story house dating to the 17th century is found left of the front door which spans three windows on each floor. As a whole the house has elements that date from as built to the Victorian era.
White Horse Inn		Ipswich	c.1659	Innkeeper John Andrews sold this house to Richard Dummer in 1659, which later gave it the historical name Cpl. John Andrews-Richard Dummer House. The house as it stands today is altered beyond recognition under its original tavern name "White Horse Inn". These alterations may have been done as early as 1763 when the house was enlarged to its Georgian form. Around 1800 the early central chimney was also removed and replaced by two side chimneys. While little is visible of the original house, the dimensions of the rooms and cased framing indicate that much of it may survive hidden behind later elements.

== See also ==
- List of historic houses in Massachusetts
- List of the oldest buildings in Massachusetts
- Oldest buildings in the United States
- First Period houses in Ipswich, Massachusetts
