= Newman–Fiske–Dodge House =

Historic house in Massachusetts, United States

- U.S. National Register of Historic Places
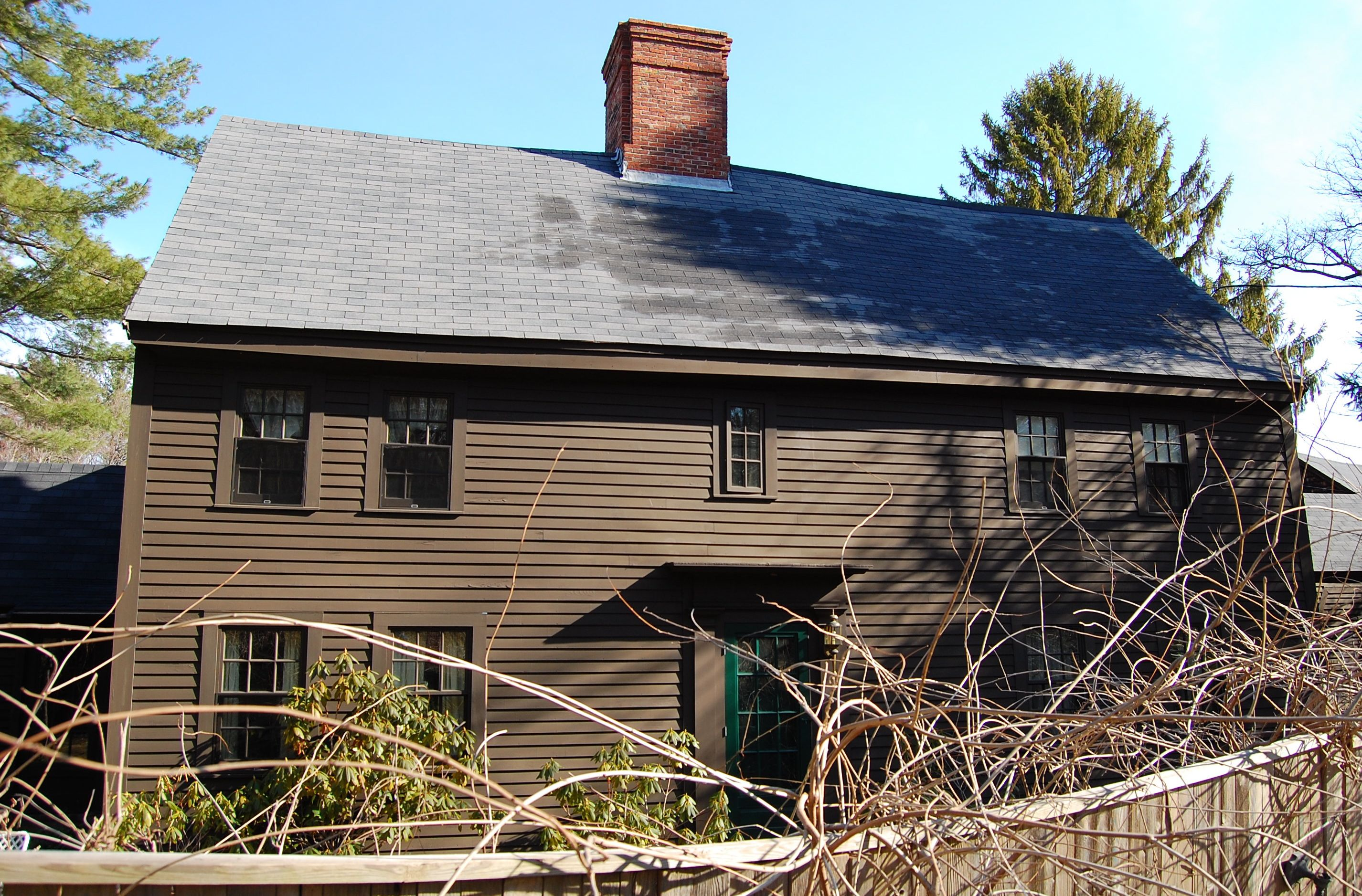
- Newman-Fiske-Dodge House

- Location within Massachusetts Location within the United States
- Location: 162 Cherry Street, Wenham, Massachusetts
- Coordinates: 42°36′13″N 70°54′54″W
- Built: 1658
- Architectural style: Colonial
- MPS: First Period Buildings of Eastern Massachusetts TR
- NRHP reference No.: 90000267
- Added to NRHP: March 9, 1990

The Newman–Fiske–Dodge House is a historic First Period house in Wenham, Massachusetts. The house contains a rare instance of preserved 17th century decoration. Like many First Period houses, it was built in stages. The first part, the now-central chimney and right-side two stories, was built c. 1658, with the left-side rooms being added c. 1695–96. The fireplace in the right-side room contains original detailing that was covered over by paneling sometime in the 18th century, and the trim on the staircase to the second floor was probably added at the time of the addition.

There have been several later additions to the house. A leanto section was added to the rear in the 18th century, and single story wings were added to either side in the 19th century. The interior was also partially redecorated in the 19th century, giving the left side front room some Greek Revival character. In the early 20th century the house underwent a major restoration, in which the left side front room was opened up to the leanto section, creating a large living space.

The first documented owner of the house (and for whom it may have been built) was the Rev. Antipas Newman, who married Elizabeth, the daughter of John Winthrop the Younger. The modifications in the 1690s were probably made by William Fiske, Jr.

The property was listed on the National Register of Historic Places in 1990. It also includes a barn which may be of 18th century origin.

== See also ==
- National Register of Historic Places listings in Essex County, Massachusetts
- First Period houses in Massachusetts (1620–1659)
- List of the oldest buildings in Massachusetts
