= First Period architecture =

Period of American colonial architecture

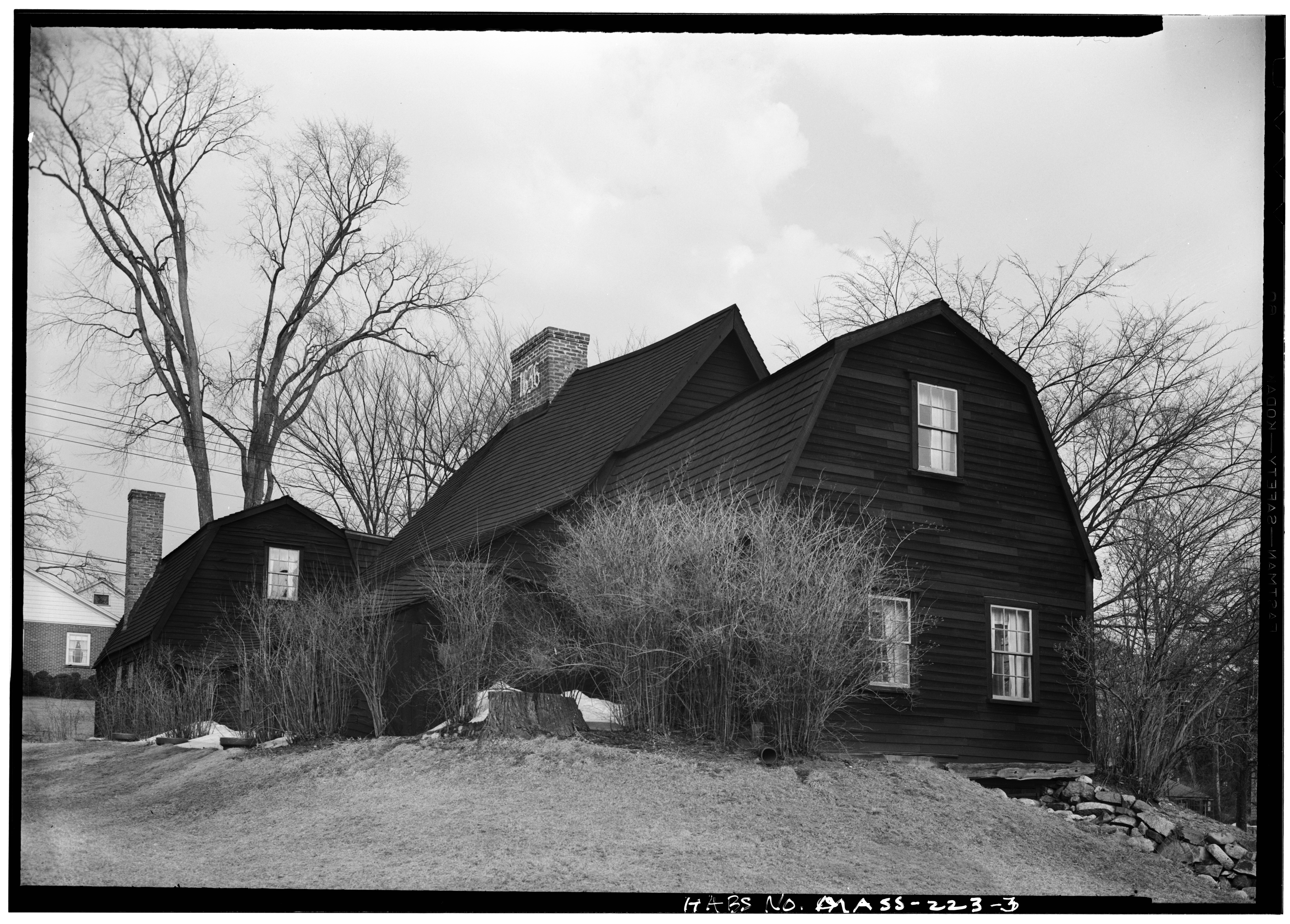
The Fairbanks House in Dedham, Massachusetts, the oldest timber structure in North America, built around 1637

First Period is an American architectural style that flourished between 1626 and 1725, used primarily by British colonists during the Colonial era, particularly in Massachusetts and Virginia. Essex County, Massachusetts, has the highest number of preserved First Period buildings.

== Typical features ==
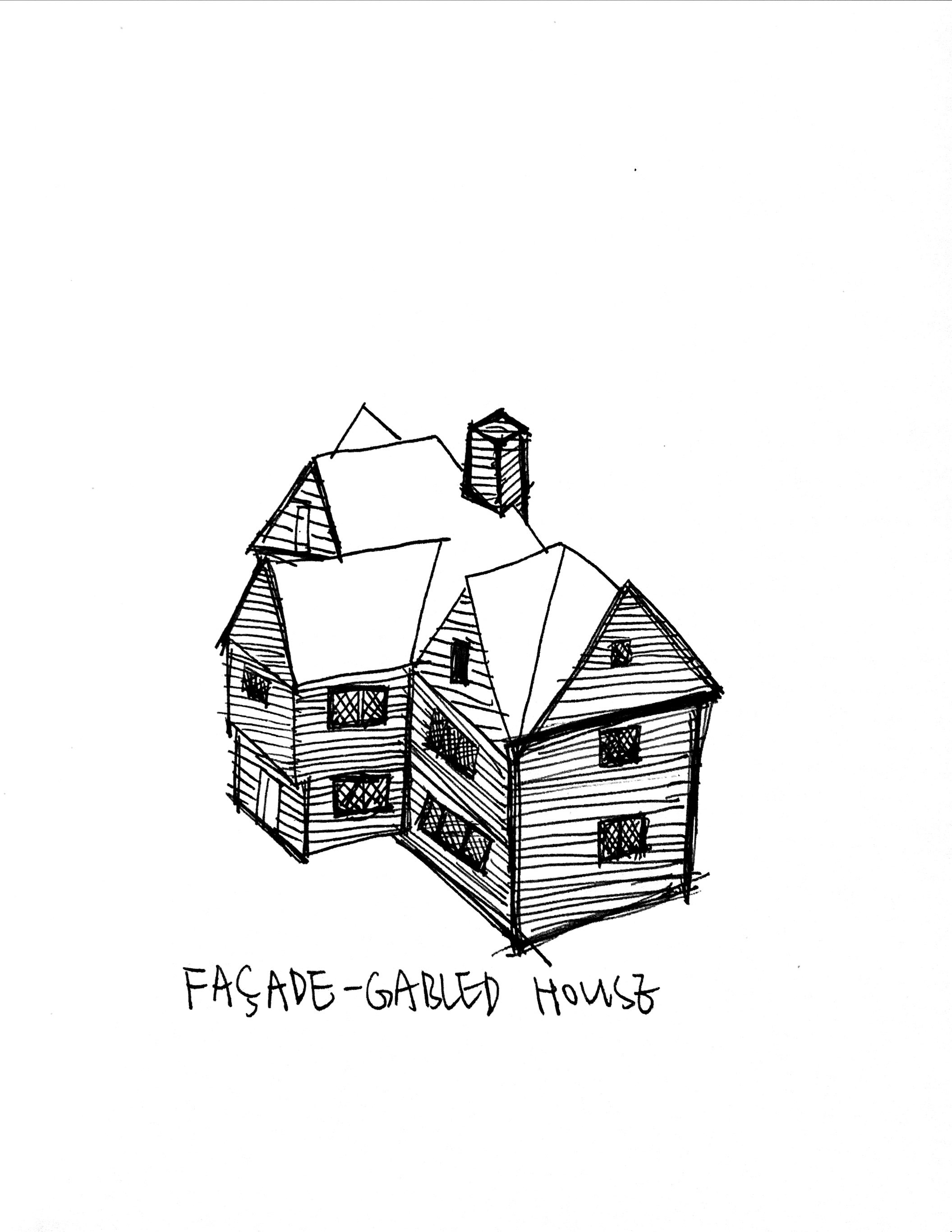
Façade-gabled house

- South-facing
- Central chimney
- Asymmetrical rooftop
- Small diamond-shaped casement windows
- Façade-gabled

The harsh winter weather in the colonies proved to be dangerous. To adapt to the conditions, First Period houses are built facing south to optimize sunlight and allow the house to be heated better. First Period houses are often constructed with a central chimney, to allow multiple rooms on multiple floors to have a fireplace and further maximize heat during the winter.

A gabled, asymmetrical rooftop helps prevent snow from accumulating on the roof during snowy winters. It also provides extra light for the attics through small casement windows. A still standing example of a First Period house in the British colonies is the Ross Tavern in Ipswich, Massachusetts, built in 1680.

== Interior features ==
- Heavy oak frame
- Exposed chamfered summer beams (front room)
- L-shaped staircases

Inside, walls were furnished with clay and twigs to act as insulation. Staircases are often built in an L or U shape around the central chimney. A heavy oak frame and thick wooden beams are used to maintain the house structure.

Wooden frames of First Period houses were smoothed by planes, whereas timber frames of later colonial architecture styles were roughly adzed and incomplete. Due to the lack of an architect, the frame was often left exposed.

== Floor plan ==
First Period houses were constructed with less variable floor plans. The most common plan is two-room central-chimney, found in Massachusetts Bay. Another variation of floor plan was a one-room-deep linear plan, which featured a small porch or hall immediately after the main entrance with large rooms on either side. The rooms would be separated by the central chimney and the staircase leading to the second floor. The second floor was usually a similar layout, but with the addition of sleeping quarters.

== Transformation of styles ==
=== Houses built before c. 1660 ===
First Period architecture could be divided into three periods of time, the earliest immigrants constitute this age category from settlement to the 1660s. Ten existing houses in Massachusetts have been proved that they were built before 1660 based on structural evidence.

=== Houses built from 1660 to 1700 ===
While houses built before 1660 were designed by colonists with no architectural background, houses built from 1660 to 1700 were constructed by experienced carpenters, with heavy timber frame to support the structure and more complex design. One iconic characteristic about it is chamfers with massive amount of decorative "stops" to carry the wooden frame.

=== Houses built from c. 1700 to 1725 ===
Houses built after 1700 are less decorative and quarter-round or wide decorative bevels replaced the older, bold version of chamfers, sophisticated design are no longer favored. With growing populace of Georgian architecture style in New England, timber frames had a tendency to be hidden and decorated, instead of being shown to people. The joiners substituted the carpenters as main contributors to interior design.

== Inheritance and innovation ==
First Period concepts were developed from English post-medieval styles, there are dominant three types of roof structures in New England which adopt architectural characteristics from the west of England, the principal and common rafter system, the principal rafter and purlin system, and the principal rafter system. These roof design systems were maintained to the later eighteenth century along with exposed and decorated timber frames. The main multiple purlins span the principal rafters at the level of the outer face of the rafters, which are placed above the bay posts, and support vertically laid roofing boards. This style had gained prevalence in the seventeenth century, especially in Essex County, where English colonists firstly settled down.

Meanwhile, English settlers innovated the principal rafter system in New England with adjustments to local conditions. In the West of England, thatch rooftops were widely used, so thick collar beams were demanded, but in New England, thatch roofs were superseded by wooden shingles which significantly reduced the weight and hence collar beams disappeared after modernization.

== Types of buildings ==
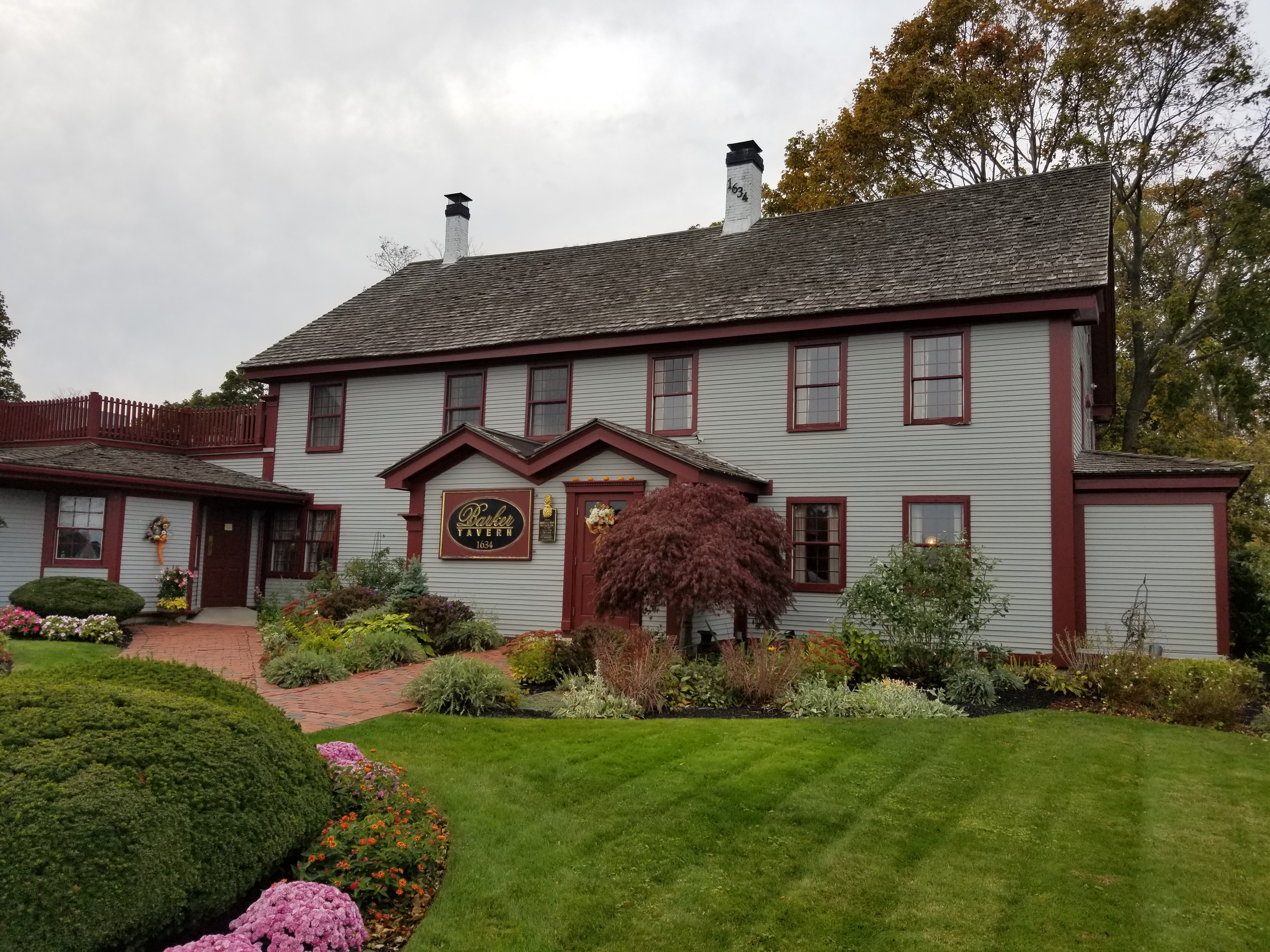
Williams–Barker House in Scituate, Massachusetts, was built c. 1634

=== Homes ===
New settlers found adequate amount of wood and mud in New England, but few materials to mix them. They decided to design their homes with solid wooden structures and natural resources to acclimatize themselves to the long and cold winter and the short time suitable for agricultural work. Hence, wooden English cottages emerged in large numbers with thick clapboards nailed to the outside.

However, houses in New England are not unified. The Puritans dislodged some people to Rhode Island and Connecticut River valley and later more untrammeled colonists from other part of England. Compared with former architectures erected by the Puritans, their style is more laissez-faire, mixed with individual personality.

Another English architecture style is brought to New England in the First Period is façade gable, its purpose is to direct the rainwater away and introduce light to the attics, which is abandoned in the later Georgian style, an advanced version of First Period styles but more modern, demands highly symmetrical design.

The Williams–Barker House is a heritage house, its foundation finished in 1634 by house owner, John Williams, who was one of the earliest English immigrants in New England. From the outside, it could be seen that the timber frame supports the shape of the house and there is a central chimney to ventilate, few casement windows and a steep roof. Inside of the house, the ceiling is fairly low and wood beams are visible, fireplace is centered to ensure it heat up the house evenly and dining tables are placed surround it, due to its new use as a restaurant.

=== Churches ===
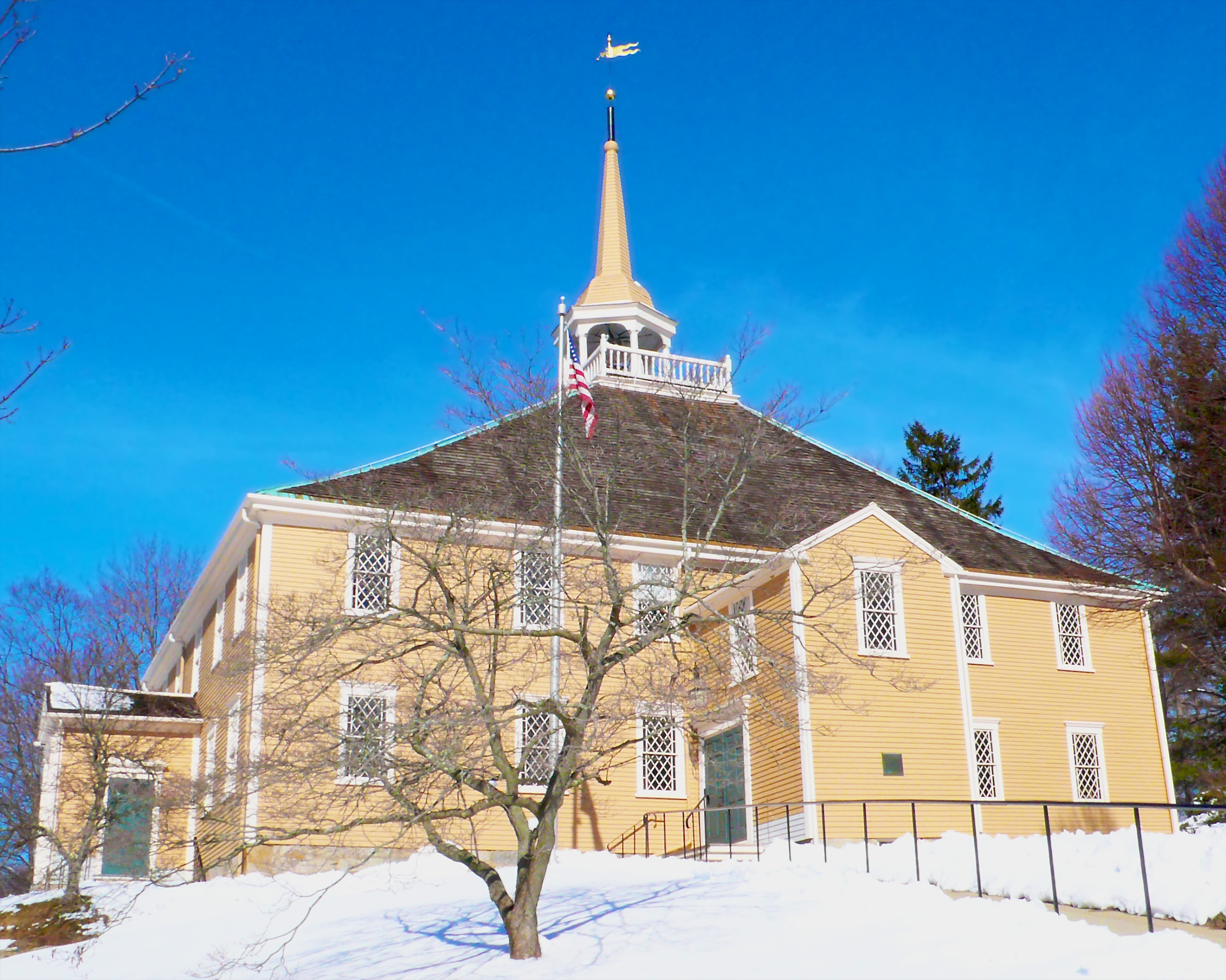
Old Ship Church exterior

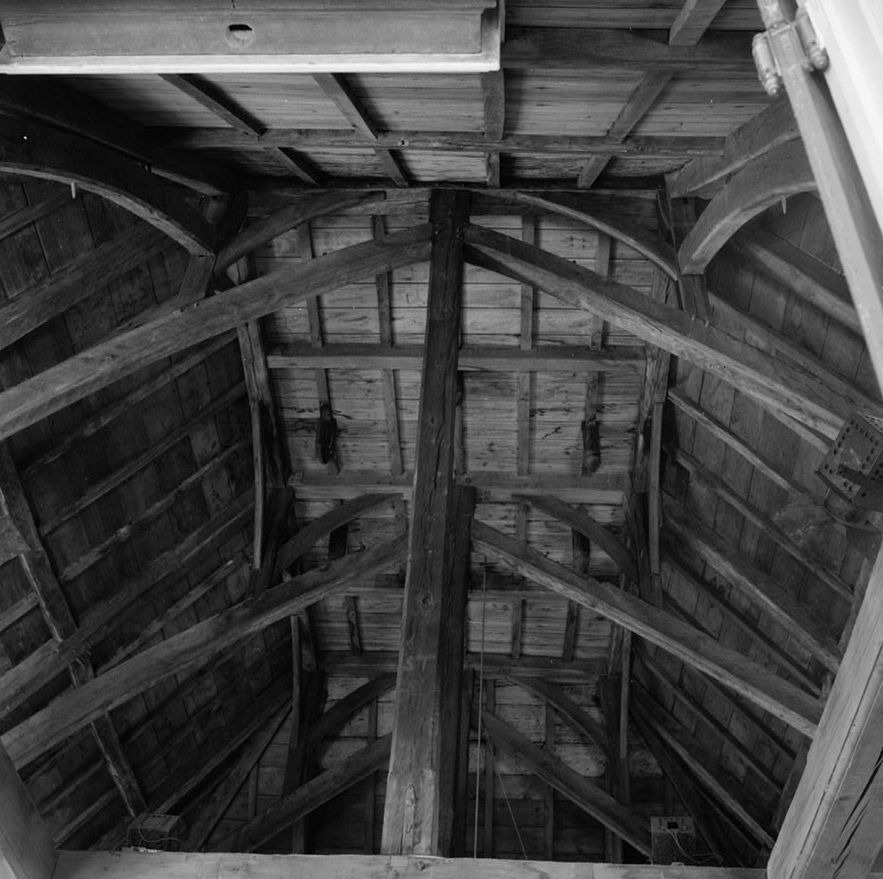
Roof Framing, General View, Old Ship Church by the Historic American Buildings Survey

Christianity was brought to the United States by early English colonists; the oldest First Period church was built in New Mexico in 1629, named San Estevan del Rey Mission Church, is still in use as a museum. And later in Virginia, Maryland, and Massachusetts, few churches were constructed by Puritans following English medieval architecture styles in the 17th century.

Unlike Boston, cities like Plymouth and Hingham have not been restored to attract tourism, churches are well-maintained in original medieval architecture styling with centered fireplaces near the staircases.

Old Ship Church is one of the oldest church built by puritans in Hingham, Massachusetts, and a well-preserved example of First Period architecture style. It is named after the shape of ceiling, which was inspired by its architects, carpenters from the early arrived English colonists. The wooden timber frame of the church and walls were constructed in 1681, and later in the 1740s, galleries on the side were added.

== See also ==
- American historic carpentry
- Georgian architecture – structures built from 1714 to 1830.
- Federal architecture – structures built from c. 1780 to 1830.
- List of the oldest buildings in America.
- First Period houses in Massachusetts (1620–1659).
- First Period houses in Massachusetts (1660–1679).
- Saltbox house
