= Parkman Tavern =

Historic house in Concord, Massachusetts, United States

- U.S. National Register of Historic Places
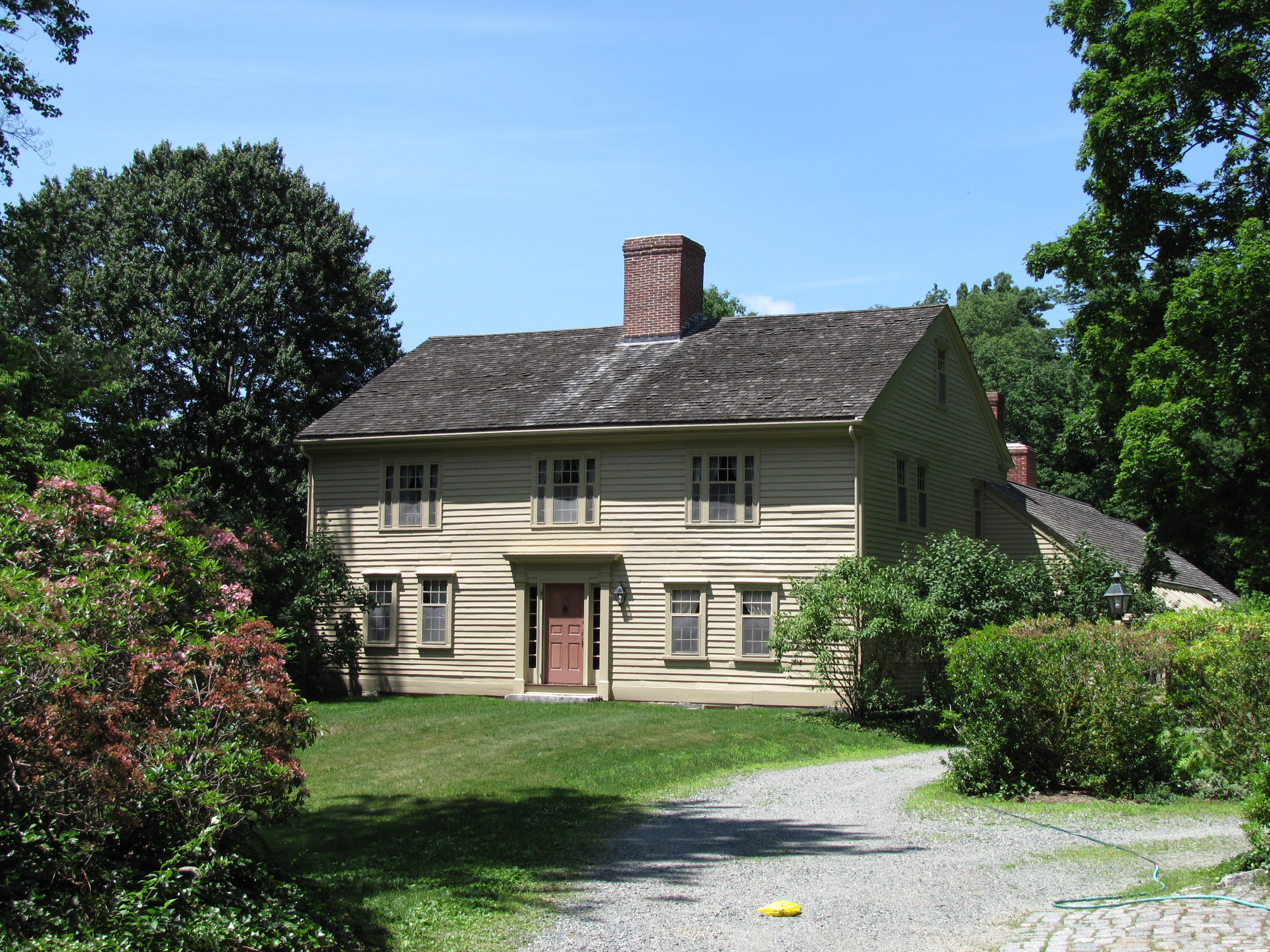
- Parkman Tavern

- Location within Massachusetts Location within the United States
- Nearest city: Concord, Massachusetts
- Coordinates: 42°25′46″N 71°22′36″W
- Built: 1659
- Architect: Wheeler, George
- Architectural style: Greek Revival
- NRHP reference No.: 79000358
- Added to NRHP: June 19, 1979

The Parkman Tavern is an historic tavern (now a private residence) at 20 Powder Mill Road in Concord, Massachusetts. It is a 2 1/2-story timber-frame structure, built by ship's carpenters with wall frames wider at top of first story than base, five bays wide, with a side-gable roof, large central chimney with multiple ovens, and clapboard siding. It is estimated to have been built in the late 17th century (1659), by a member of the locally prominent Wheeler family. In the late 18th century it was purchased by William Parkman, great-uncle to historian Francis Parkman, who operated a tavern on the premises.

The house was listed on the National Register of Historic Places in 1979.

== See also ==
- First Period houses in Massachusetts (1620–1659)
- List of the oldest buildings in Massachusetts
- National Register of Historic Places listings in Concord, Massachusetts
