= Richard Sparrow House =

Historic house in Plymouth, Massachusetts, US

- U.S. National Register of Historic Places
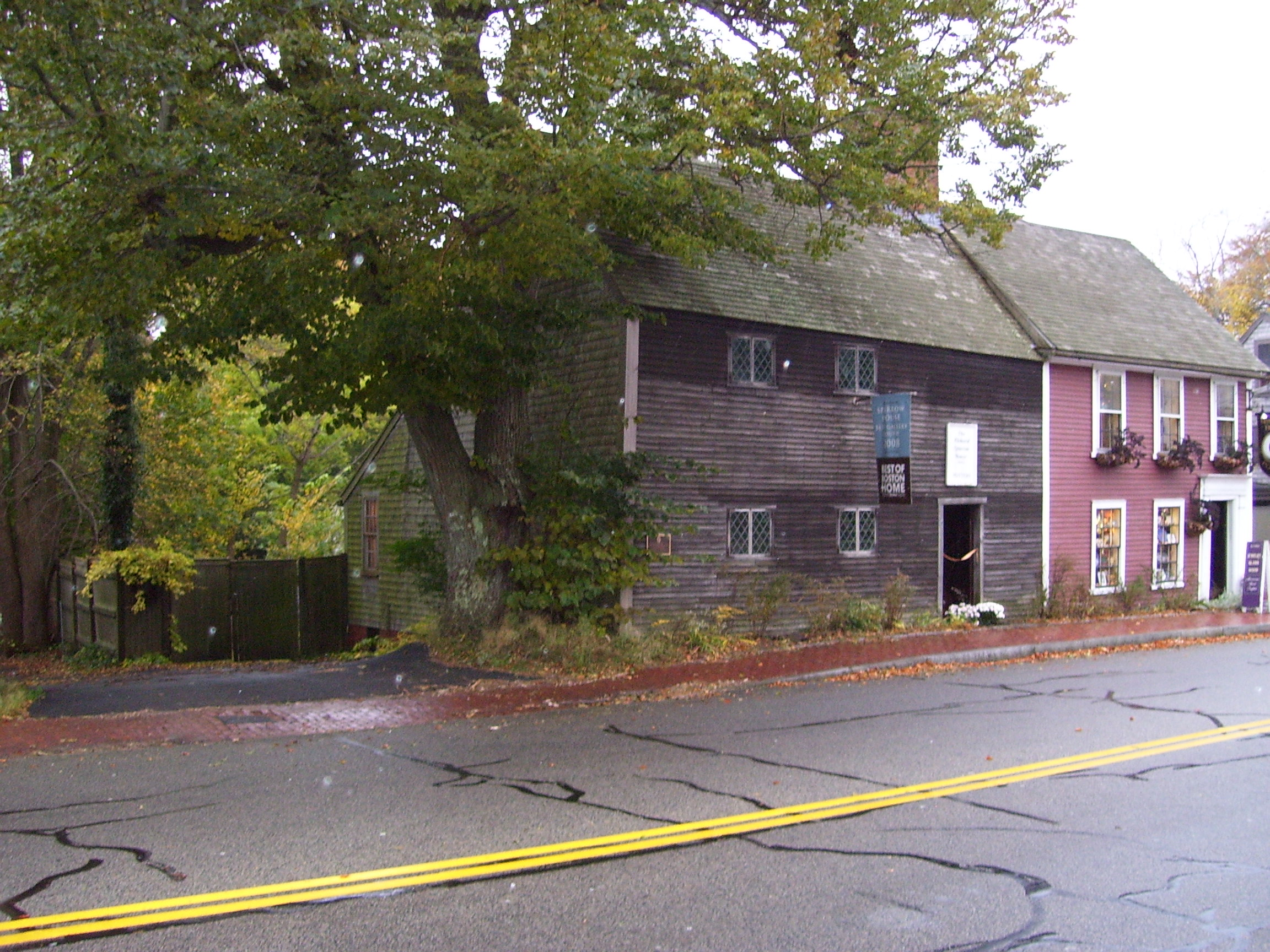

- Location within Massachusetts Location within the United States
- Location: Plymouth, Massachusetts
- Coordinates: 41°57′15″N 70°39′54″W
- Built: ca. 1640
- NRHP reference No.: 74002035
- Added to NRHP: October 9, 1974

The Richard Sparrow House is a historic house at 42 Summer Street in Plymouth, Massachusetts and the oldest surviving house in Plymouth.

The house was built around 1640 by Richard Sparrow, an English surveyor who arrived in Plymouth in 1636. He was granted a 16-acre (6.5 ha) tract of land in 1636 on which he later built the house. Sparrow moved to Eastham in 1653. The Richard Sparrow House was added to the National Register of Historic Places in 1974. It is now operated as a house museum and art gallery and is part of Plymouth Village Historic District.

== See also ==
- First Period houses in Massachusetts (1620–1659)
- List of the oldest buildings in Massachusetts
- National Register of Historic Places listings in Plymouth County, Massachusetts
