= Samuel Lucius–Thomas Howland House =

Historic house in Plymouth, Massachusetts, USA

Coordinates: 41.958356°N 70.662924°W

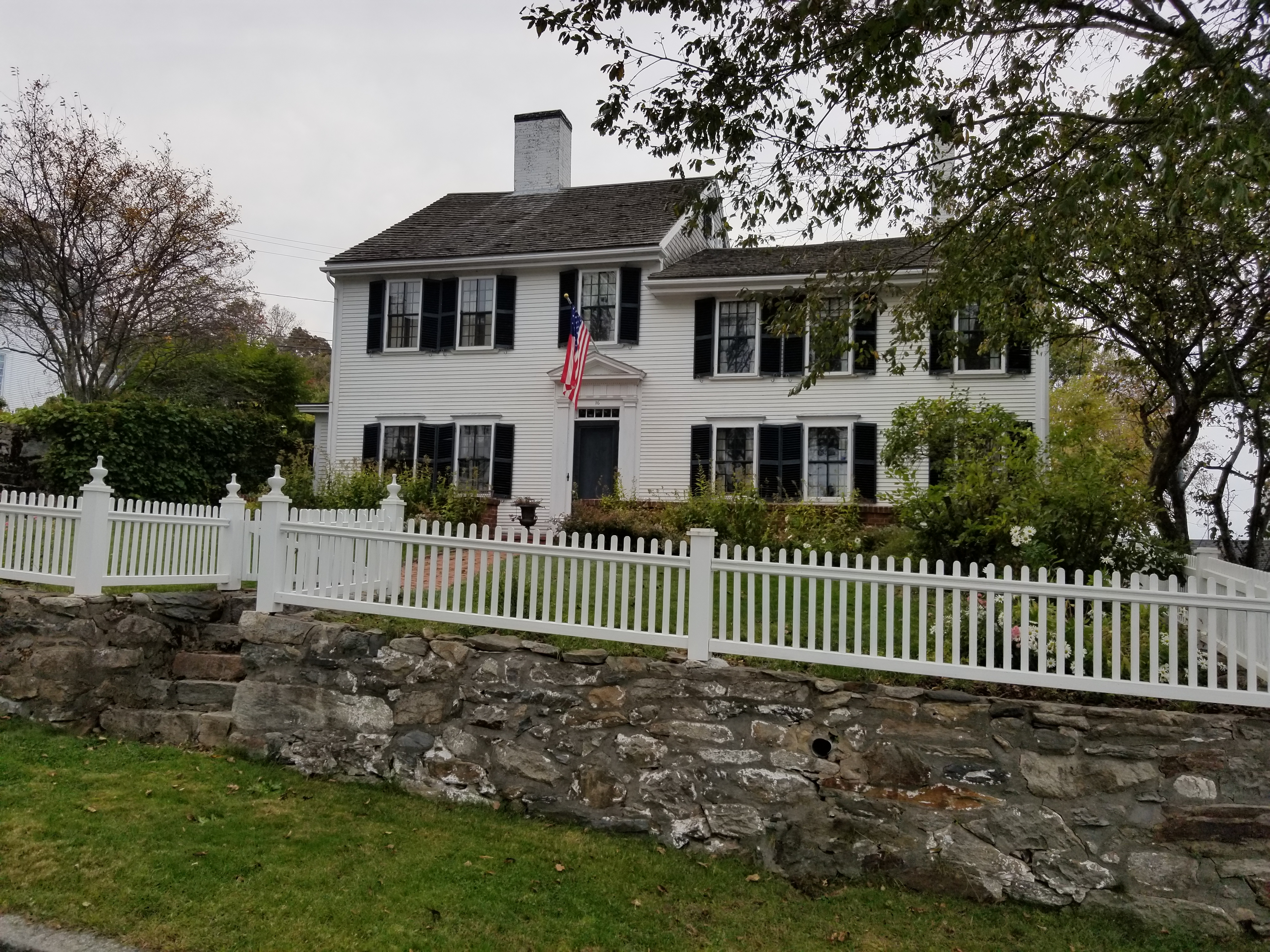
2019 image of Samuel Lucas–Thomas Howland House on North Street

Samuel Lucius–Thomas Howland House (also known as the Samuel Lucas–Thomas Howland House) is a historic house at 36 North Street in Plymouth, Massachusetts located within the Plymouth Village Historic District as a contributing property. It is located adjacent to Cole's Hill from which it is separated by North Street. The earliest part of the house is estimated to have been constructed around 1637–1640, which would make it one of the oldest houses in Massachusetts. In 1697, Thomas Howland transferred the property to Samuel Lucas. The Jackson and Russell families occupied the property in the nineteenth and early twentieth centuries until 1939. As of 2019, it remains a private residence.

== Images ==
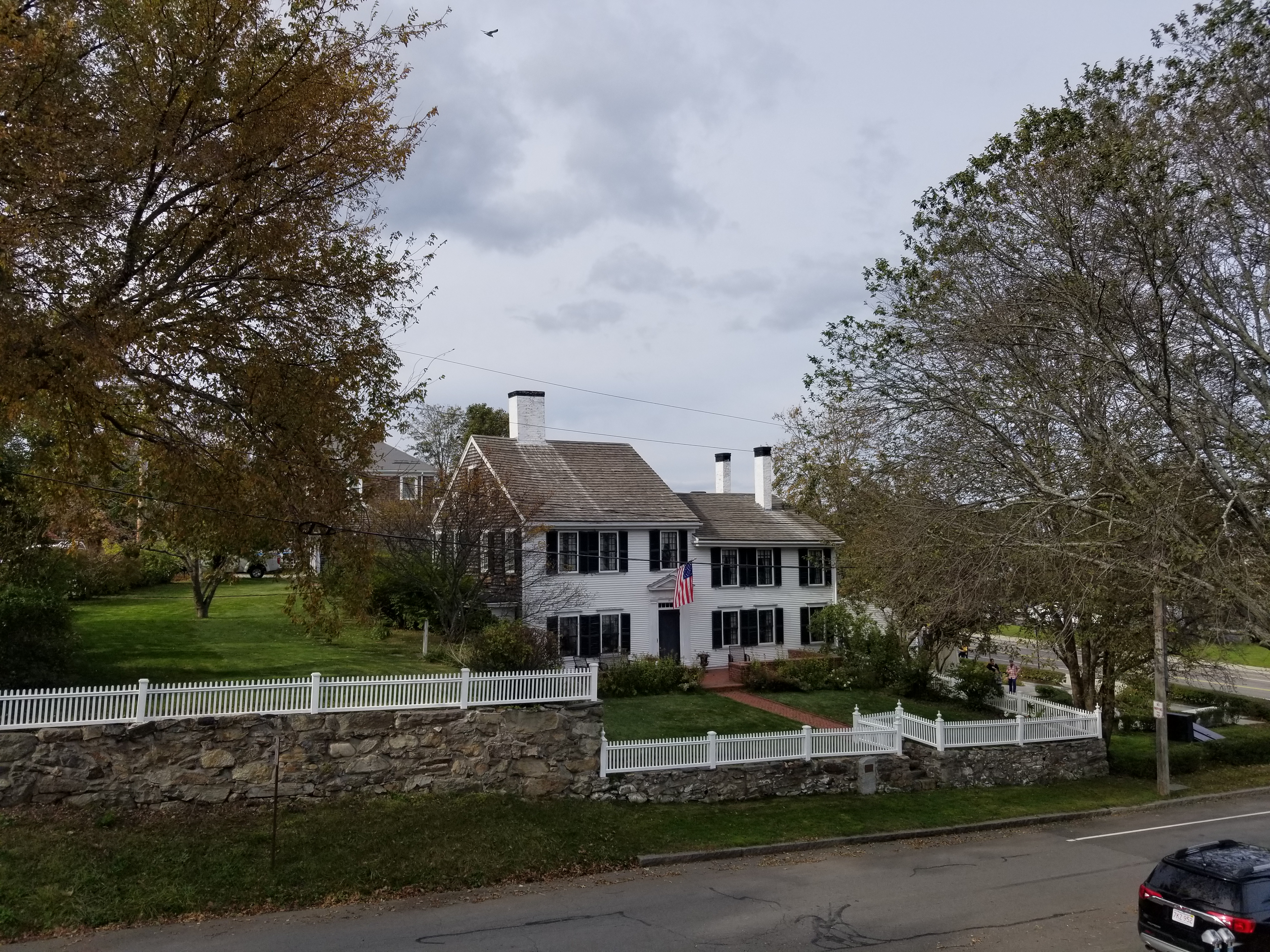
2019 image

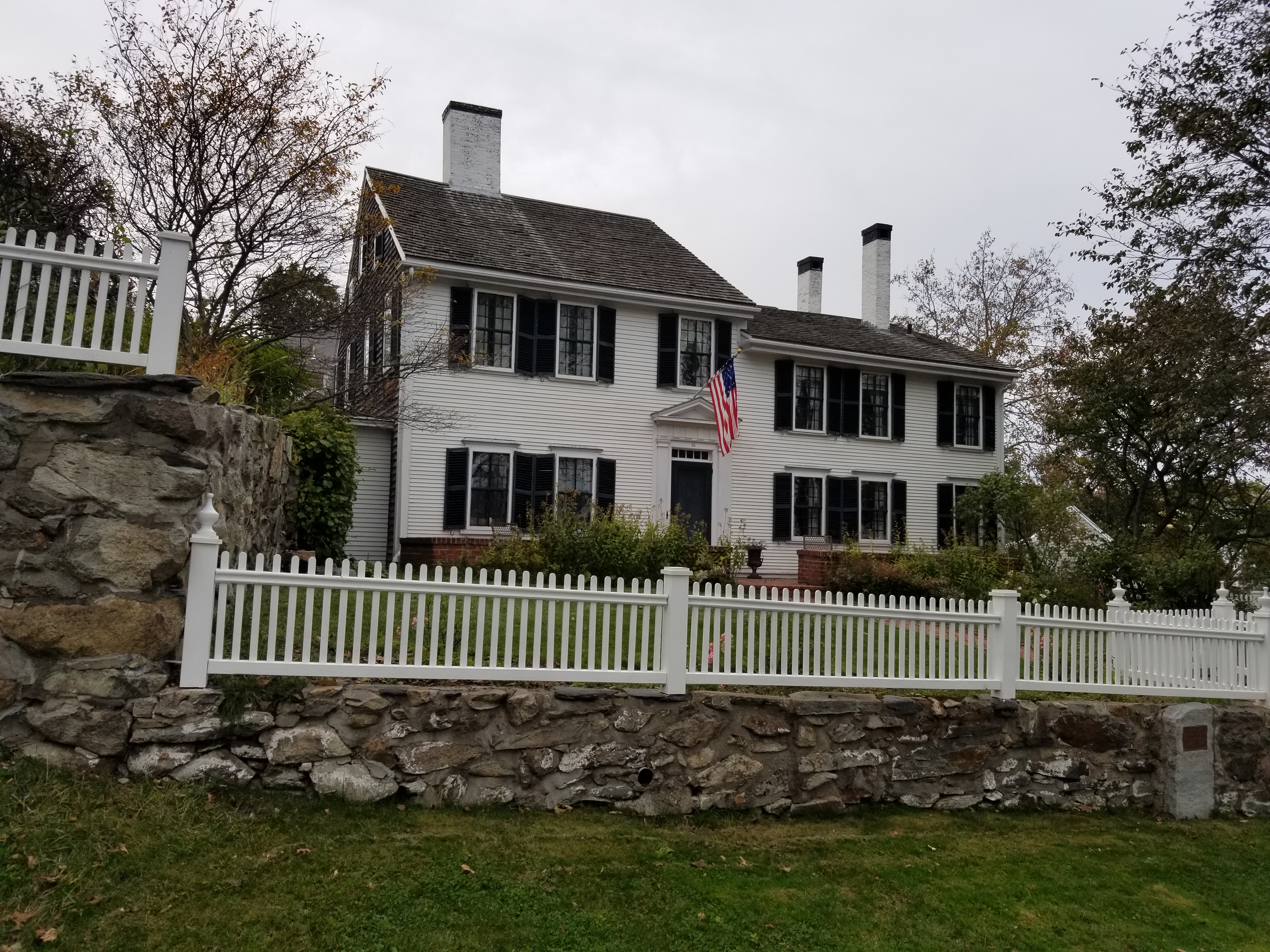
2019 image

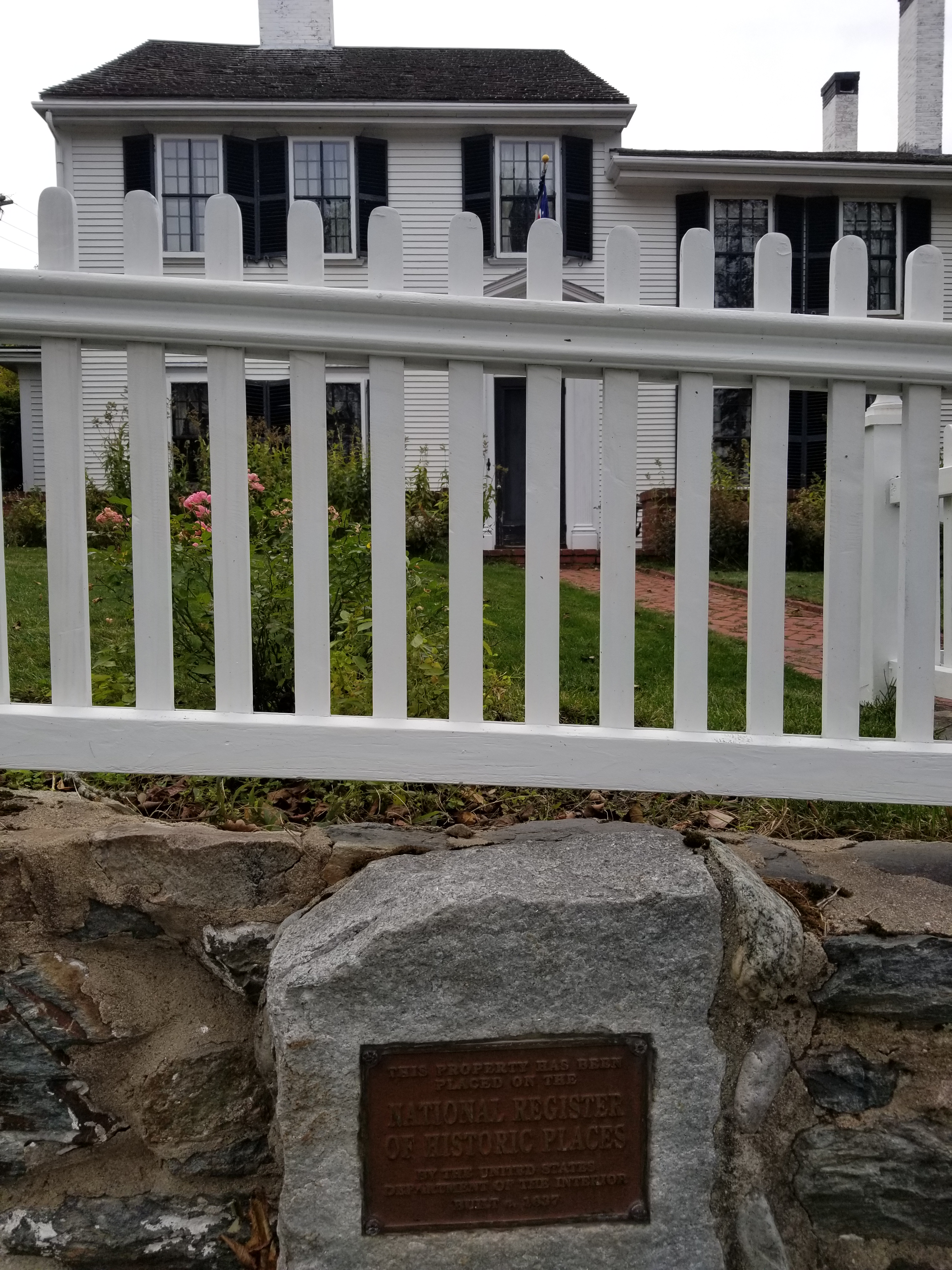
National Register plaque citing a c. 1637 construction date

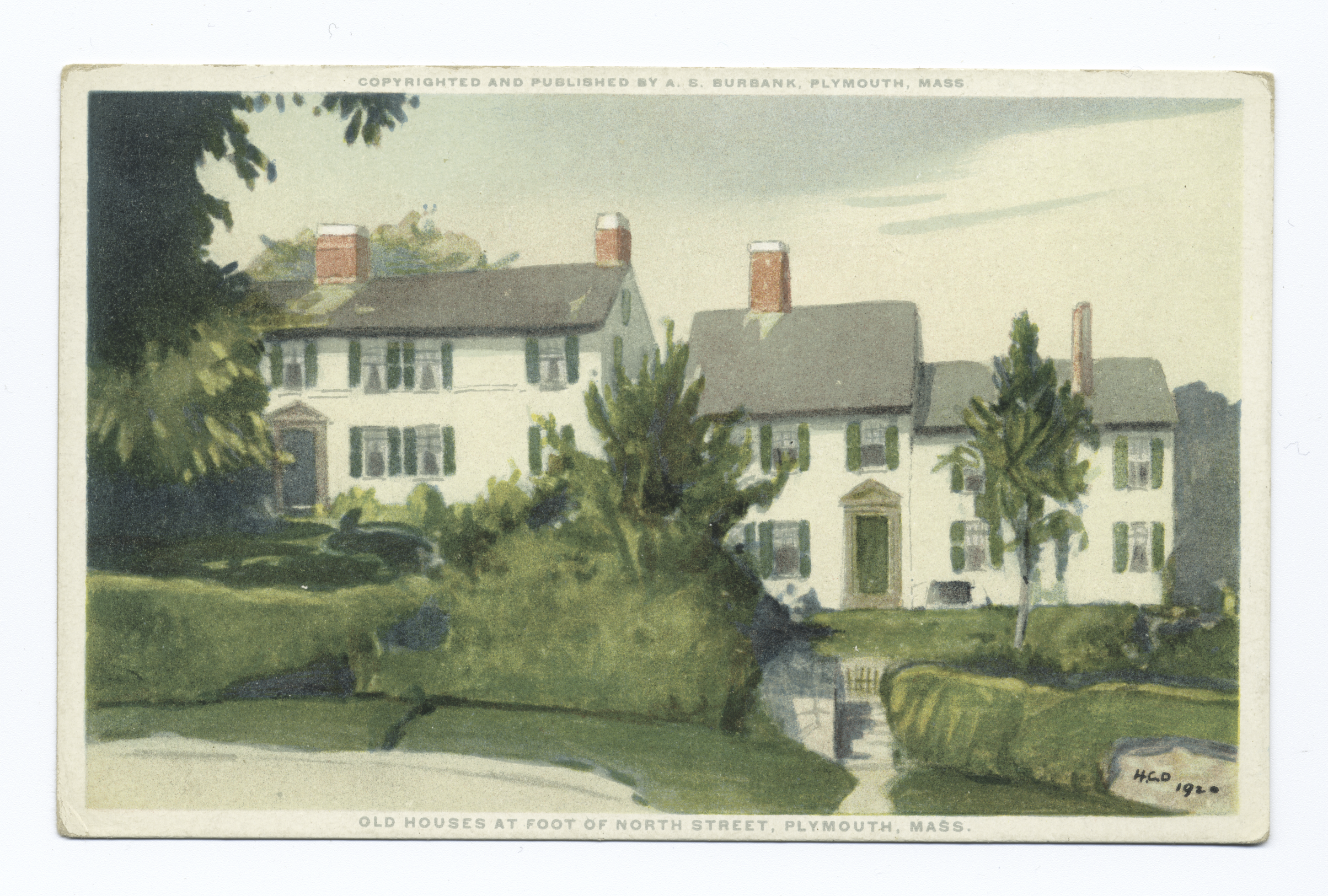
early 20th century postcard which also shows house on left which was torn down

== See also ==
- First Period houses in Massachusetts (1620–1659)
- List of the oldest buildings in Massachusetts
