= Plymouth Village Historic District =

Historic district in Massachusetts, United States

- U.S. National Register of Historic Places
- U.S. Historic district
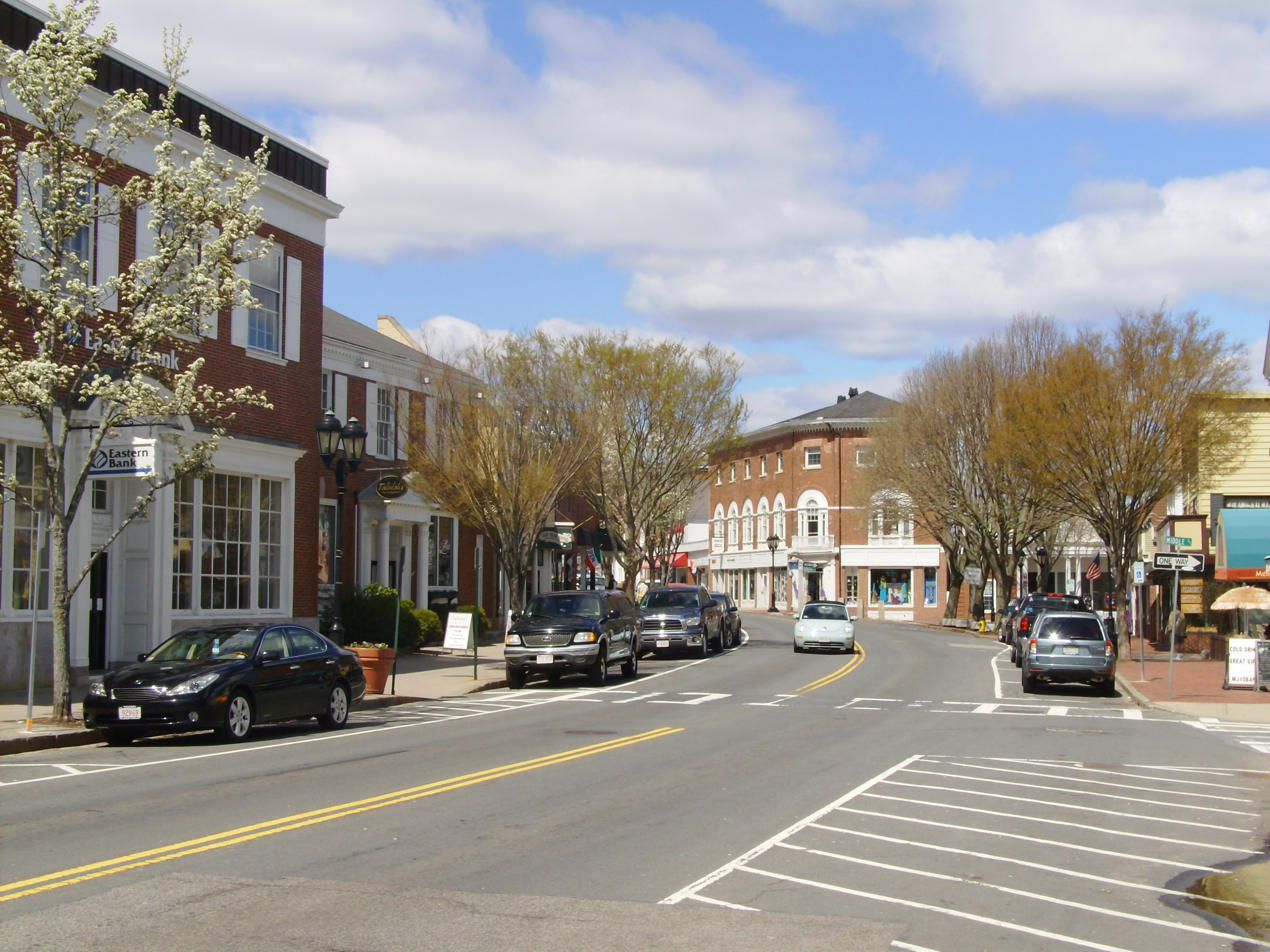

- Location within Massachusetts Location within the United States
- Location: Plymouth, Massachusetts
- Coordinates: 41°57′26″N 70°39′49″W
- Architect: Multiple
- Architectural style: Greek Revival, Georgian, Federal
- NRHP reference No.: 82004435
- Added to NRHP: June 2, 1982

The Plymouth Village Historic District is a historic district encompassing part of the area of earliest settlement of the Plymouth Colony in Plymouth, Massachusetts. It includes properties in an area roughly bounded on the west by North Street, on the north by Water Street on the east by Town Brook, and on the south by Court Street and Main Street. The area includes Leyden Street and streets that were laid out as early as 1633, and nearby are some of Plymouth's oldest surviving houses (Richard Sparrow House (1640), Harlow Old Fort House (1677), Samuel Lucius-Thomas Howland House (1640) and Jabez Howland House (1667)). The site is near Plymouth Rock where the Pilgrims landed in 1620 and the Pilgrim Hall Museum containing many of their surviving artifacts.

The district was listed on the National Register of Historic Places in 1982.

== See also ==
- Burial Hill
- National Register of Historic Places listings in Plymouth County, Massachusetts
