= Elisha Leavitt =

American loyalist

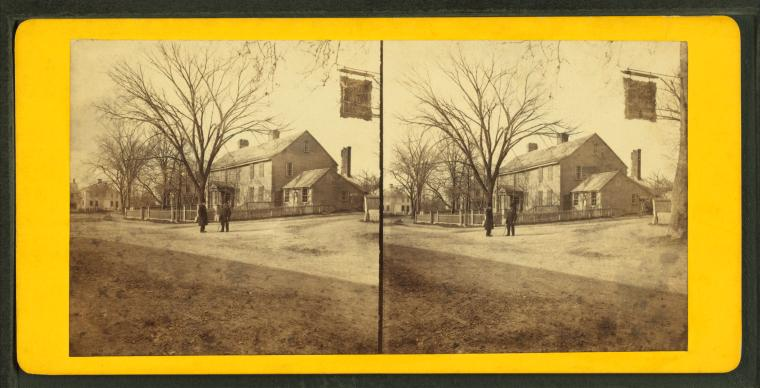
First home of Loyalist Elisha Leavitt, originally the Thaxter estate, later demolished, Hingham, Massachusetts

Elisha Leavitt (1714–1790) was a Hingham, Massachusetts, Loyalist landowner who owned several islands in Boston Harbor. During the Siege of Boston in 1775, Leavitt encouraged British forces to use one of his islands to gather hay for their horses, triggering one of the first skirmishes of the American War of Independence, The Battle of Grape Island (or Grape Island Alarm). This encounter followed the battles at Lexington and Concord by a month, and preceded the Battle of Bunker Hill by less than a month.

== Life ==
Elisha Leavitt was born at Hingham on March 1, 1714, the son of Elisha Leavitt Sr. and the former Sarah Lane, daughter of Ebenezer Lane. He was married to the former Ruth Marsh, daughter of Thomas and Mary (Burr) Marsh, with whom he had four children.

Elisha Leavitt was a successful businessman and landowner in Hingham. In 1771 Leavitt purchased one of Hingham's landmarks, the old Thaxter Mansion built in 1652, which had tapestried walls, elaborate painted murals, decorated door panels and large tiled fireplaces.

When Leavitt bought the home, it had been occupied by five generations of the Thaxter family, including Samuel Thaxter Junior, son of Col. Samuel Thaxter. (After Thaxter's death, his widow remarried Rev. John Hancock of Braintree, and was the mother of the first signer of the Declaration of Independence.) The last Thaxter owner, Samuel Thaxter, moved to Bridgewater, Massachusetts in 1771 and sold the house to Elisha Leavitt.

By the time Leavitt bought the Thaxter Mansion, he was a confirmed Tory, and he used a blind passage in the house, accessed by a secret door, to hide Tories from nearby Marshfield when the local Committee of Safety conducted a search for them. The Tories were later successfully smuggled by water to Boston.

Leavitt was an unlikely Loyalist. He began his career as a simple blacksmith, was named constable of Hingham, then launched himself on a career as a trader and entrepreneur, becoming a shareholder in the fishing company and engaging in navigation as a shipowner.

Eventually Leavitt became one of the largest landowners in the region; among his holdings were several islands in Boston Harbor, including 62-acre (250,000 m^{2}) Lovells Island, purchased by Leavitt from the town of Charlestown in 1767, 50-acre (200,000 m^{2}) Grape Island, half of 23-acre (93,000 m^{2}) Gallops Island, and 39-acre (160,000 m^{2}) Georges Island. The islands were largely used for pasturage for cattle and horses and for raising hay. Leavitt had purchased Georges Island from Hannah Greenleaf in April 1765. Elisha Leavitt also owned land across the region, including substantial acreage at Cohasset, the seaside town carved from Hingham.

== Battle of Grape Island ==
During the so-called 'Provision War' at the outbreak of hostilities, as British officers struggled to find sympathetic citizens who would supply their army with food and drink, the Tory Elisha Leavitt stepped forward to offer British troops hay, vegetables and cattle. His actions infuriated locals passionate about the Continental cause. Leavitt's ownership of Grape Island then brought him unwelcome prominence.

Realizing that British officers needed pasturage for their horses during the Siege of Boston in 1775, Leavitt offered them the use of Grape Island. But when British forces landed on the island in their sloops, the alarm was sounded on the mainland. Shortly afterwards hundreds of militiamen from the South Shore assembled at Weymouth, opposite Grape Island, and began firing on the British. Eventually the militiamen landed on Grape Island in skiffs, forcing the British to flee. The angry colonists, in retaliation for Leavitt's actions, burned the wealthy Tory's barn to the ground and confiscated his cattle. "This glorified skirmish", wrote historian Edward Rowe Snow, "has gone down in the history as the Battle of Grape Island."

The incident was closely watched by many observers in the Boston area, including John Adams's wife Abigail, who noted the "widespread confusion" in her hometown the day of the encounter – the closest the American Revolutionary War had come to the Adams family residence. Abigail wrote to her husband on May 24, 1775: "...it seems their Expidition (sic) was to Grape Island for Levets hay." Abigail Adams praised several members of her husband's family, who were among the hundreds of Continental militiamen who drove off the British soldiers. "I may say with truth, all of Weymouth, Braintree, Hingham, who were able to bear arms, and hundreds from other towns within twenty, thirty, forty miles of Weymouth."

Following the Grape Island skirmish, enraged citizens turned up on the doorstep of Leavitt's mansion to set it alight or "for the purpose of doing violence to his person", according to the History of the Town of Hingham. But the avuncular Leavitt averted trouble and defused the mob by rolling out a barrel of rum and "dispensing its contents liberally."

"The gentlemen aforesaid", says the Hingham history, referring delicately to the assembled mob, "were received by Mrs. Leavitt in elegant dress, and urged to walk in and partake of the wine. This unexpected and politic Courtesy disarmed the fury of the Whigs, and the threatened violence was drowned in good cheer."

== Later life and legacy ==
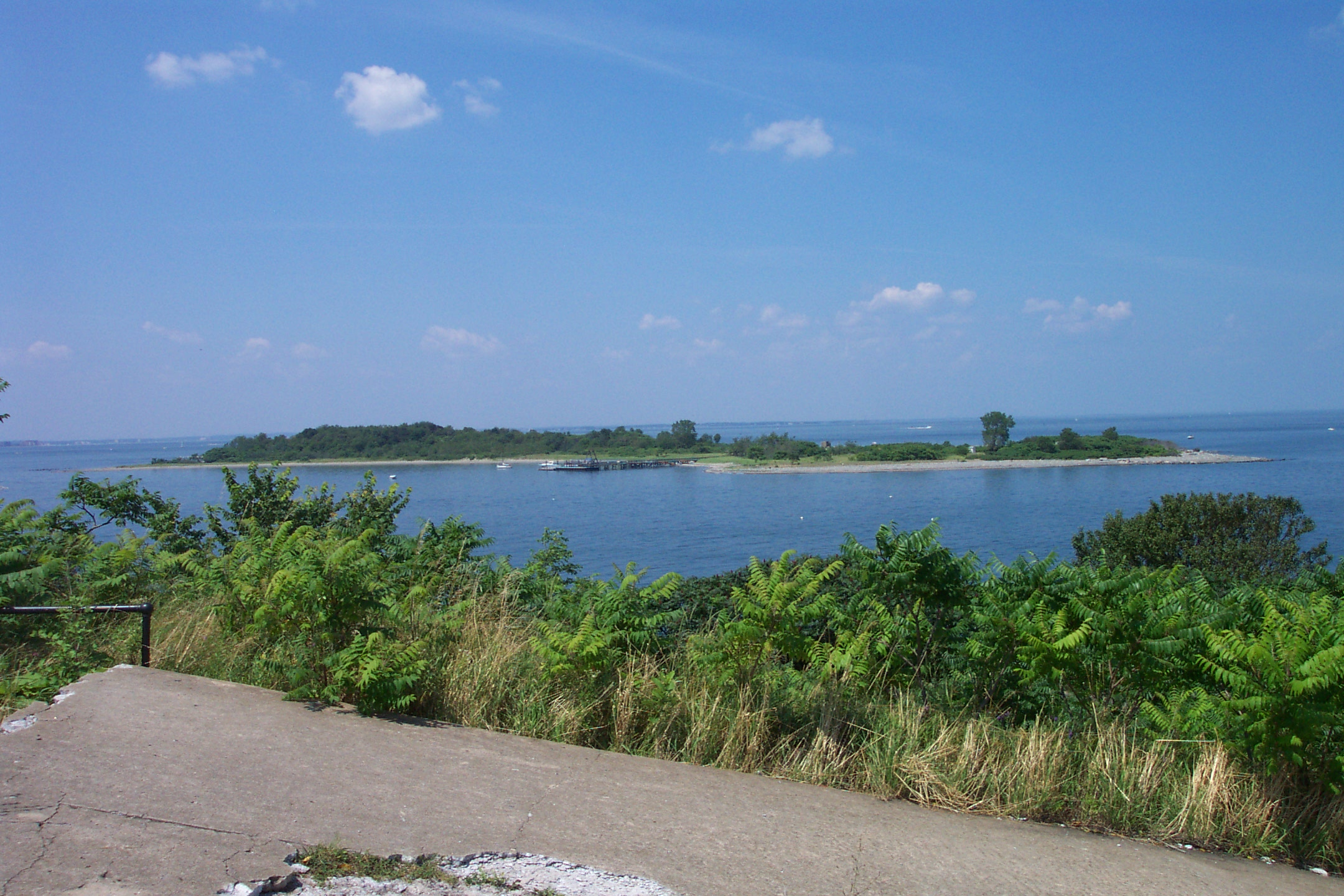
Lovells Island, as seen from Georges Island, Boston Harbor, both owned by Hingham Tory Elisha Leavitt

Unlike many Loyalists, Leavitt was never forced to flee the country, nor give up his substantial holdings. Whether his successful transition to the age of American independence was due to his personality, sheer pluck, or to a change of heart is unknown.

While Leavitt was one of Hingham's most visible Tories, his son Dr. Martin Leavitt, born in 1755, had different politics. A close friend and Harvard classmate (1773) of Bela Lincoln of Hingham, Martin Leavitt practiced medicine until he died aged thirty on November 27, 1785, when he drowned in the town's mill pond.

Elisha Leavitt died in 1790 at his home on North Street in Hingham, not far from Leavitt Street, where Elisha's great-grandfather John Leavitt had settled in 1636.

At his death Leavitt willed ownership of Gallops Island to his grandson Caleb Rice, son of Col. Nathan Rice of the Continental Army, and former aide de camp to General Benjamin Lincoln, a Hingham native. Col. Rice had married Elisha Leavitt's daughter Meriel. Caleb Rice subsequently purchased the half of Gallops Island that his grandfather Leavitt did not own. Rice later sold the entire island to the government.
