= Williams–Barker House =

Historic House in Massachusetts, United States

Coordinates: 42.2035°N 70.727°W

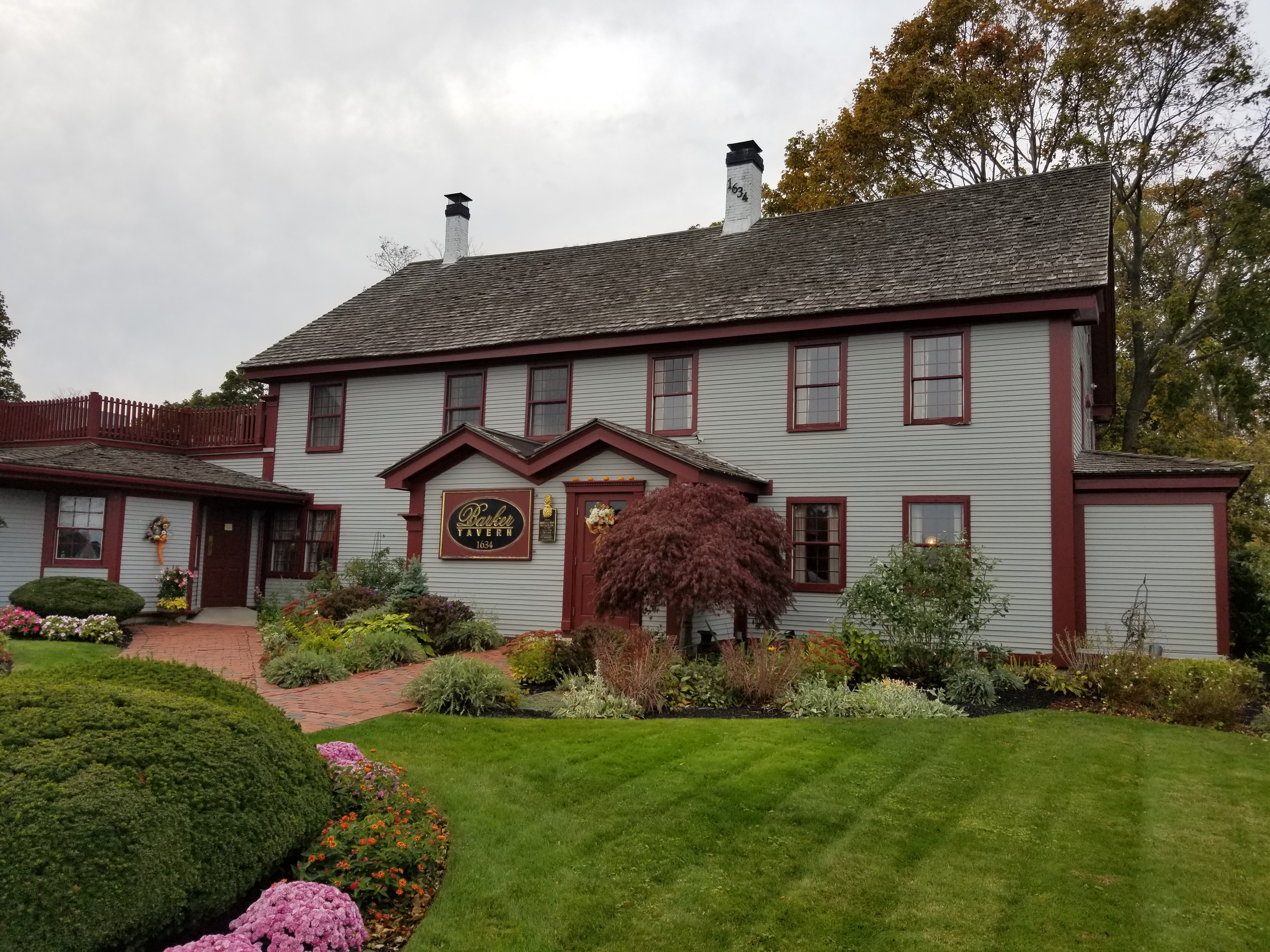
Barker Tavern in Scituate, Massachusetts, also known as the Williams–Barker House, built c. 1634

Williams–Barker House (also known as Barker House) is an historic building on Barker Road in Scituate, Massachusetts. The core of house is believed to date from 1634 when it was constructed by John Williams who had emigrated from England. The construction date of the building has not yet been verified through dendrochronology.

The house is believed to have served as a garrison during King Philip's War when it was owned by Captain John Williams and the walls were reinforced with bricks. The thick wooden walls and beams were "once pierced for portholes." The Williams and Barker families occupied the house for seven generations, until it was sold in 1910 and became known as the Hatherly Inn in the early twentieth century. In 1978, the Jordan family purchased and began operating the tavern as the Barker Tavern. The building is now extensively renovated and continues to be operated as an event venue.

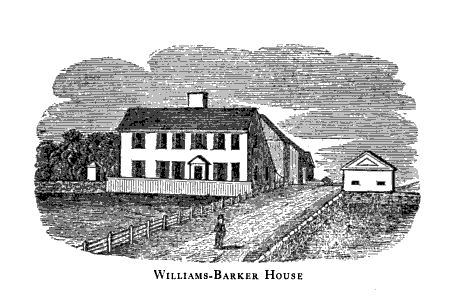
Barker Tavern in the 19th century

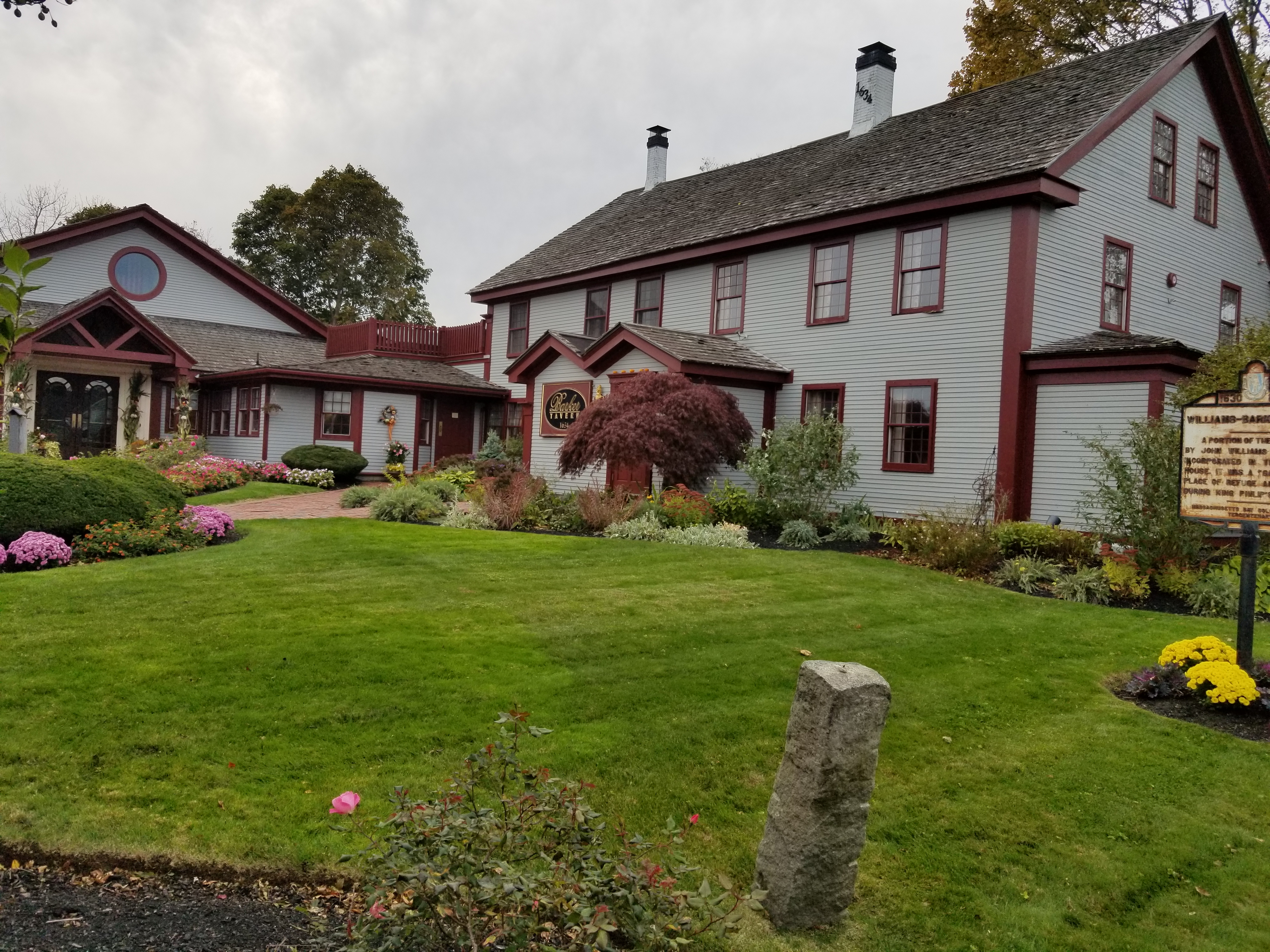
Massachusetts historical marker states "A portion of this house built by John Williams in 1654 is incorporated in the present house. It was a 'Garrison' and place of refuge and defence during King Phillip's War. Massachusetts Bay Colony Tercentenary Commission

== See also ==
- First Period houses in Massachusetts (1620–1659)
