= Ipswich Mills Historic District =

Historic district in Massachusetts, United States

- U.S. National Register of Historic Places
- U.S. Historic district
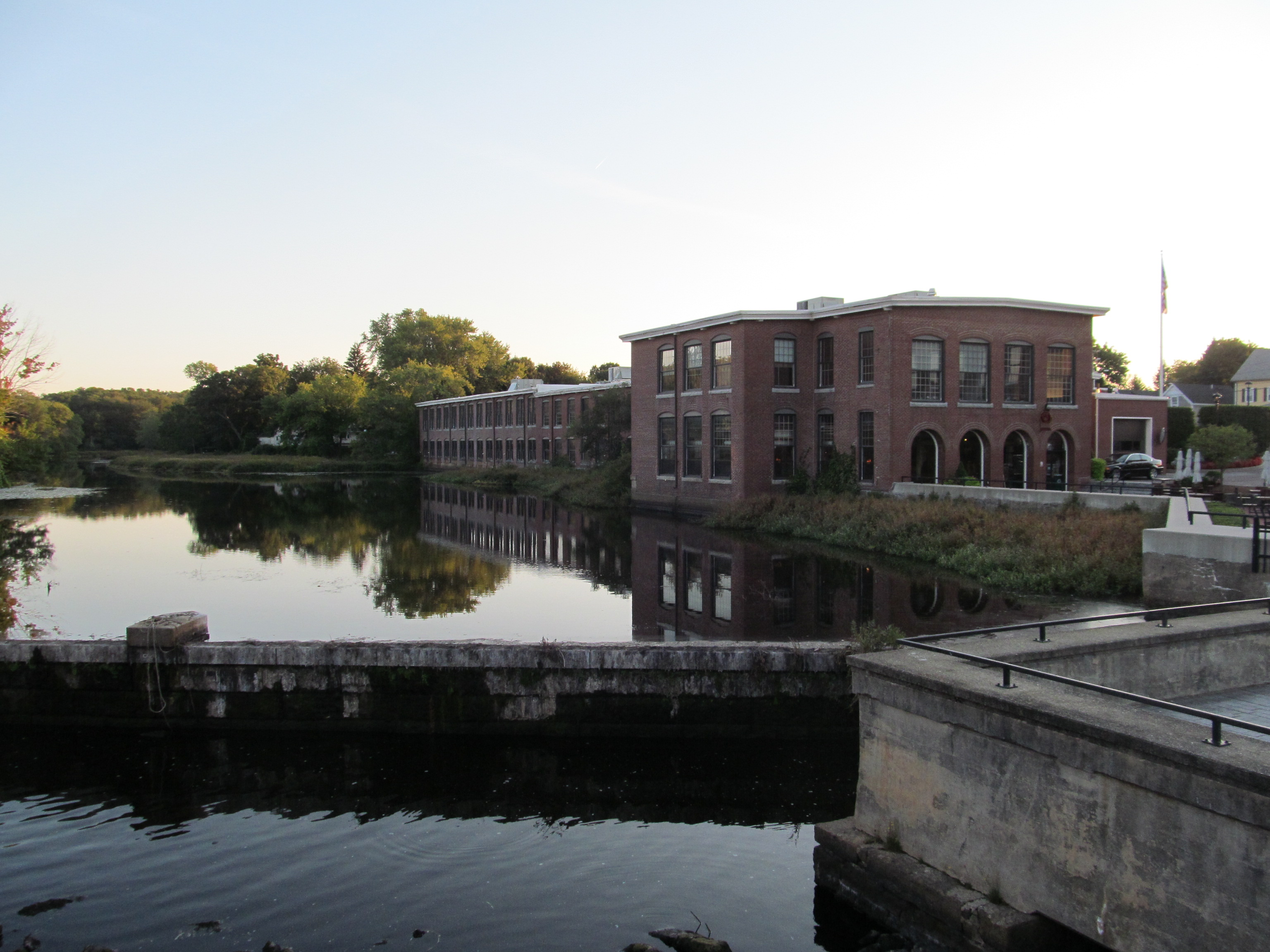
- EBSCO Publishing

- Location within Massachusetts Location within the United States
- Location: Ipswich, Massachusetts
- Coordinates: 42°40′33″N 70°50′24″W
- Built: 1868
- Architectural style: Greek Revival, Italianate
- NRHP reference No.: 96000923
- Added to NRHP: August 22, 1996

The Ipswich Mills Historic District encompasses a major textile mill complex and associated worker housing along the Ipswich River near the center of Ipswich, Massachusetts. The district includes the factories of the Ipswich Mill Company (off Union and Estes Streets), and several blocks of modest worker cottages mostly on side streets off Estes and Kimball Streets. The site had been used as for mills since the 17th century, and was purchased by the Ipswich Mill Company (owned by textile magnate Amos Adams Lawrence) in 1868. Mill worker housing was built surrounding the complex through the early 20th century, when River Court, Peatfield Street, and 1st through 6th Streets were laid out. The district was listed on the National Register of Historic Places in 1996.

== Description and history ==
The Ipswich Mills district is located just south of the Ipswich central business district, on the west bank of the Ipswich River and south of the Choate Bridge. It is bounded on the west by railroad tracks and the Ipswich commuter rail station. The northern part of the district is where the mill complex was located, with the mill-related residential area stretching out to its south. The mill complex at its height was a large collection of masonry structures that were for the most part interconnected in some way, all but two of which were demolished in the 1970s. One of these, the yarn mill, was one of the major visual elements of the mill complex. It was built in 1880, and is a four-story brick structure with several side wings that were added in the early 20th century. The second building, used for finishing, is a two-story structure that directly abuts the river, and is now separated from the first building by a passage connecting two parking lots.

Most of the residences to the south of the mill complex post-date the establishment in 1868 of the Ipswich Mills. One notable house that stood in the area until the 1890s was the John Whipple House, now a National Historic Landmark, which was used as mill tenement housing prior to being moved to its present location on Ipswich's South Green. The majority of the residential structures are houses that were built by the Ipswich Mill Company in the first two decades of the 20th century. The company built three basic types, which were typically clustered together on the side streets off Estes and Kimball Streets: single-family houses either 1-1/2 or 2-1/2 stories in height, and duplexes.

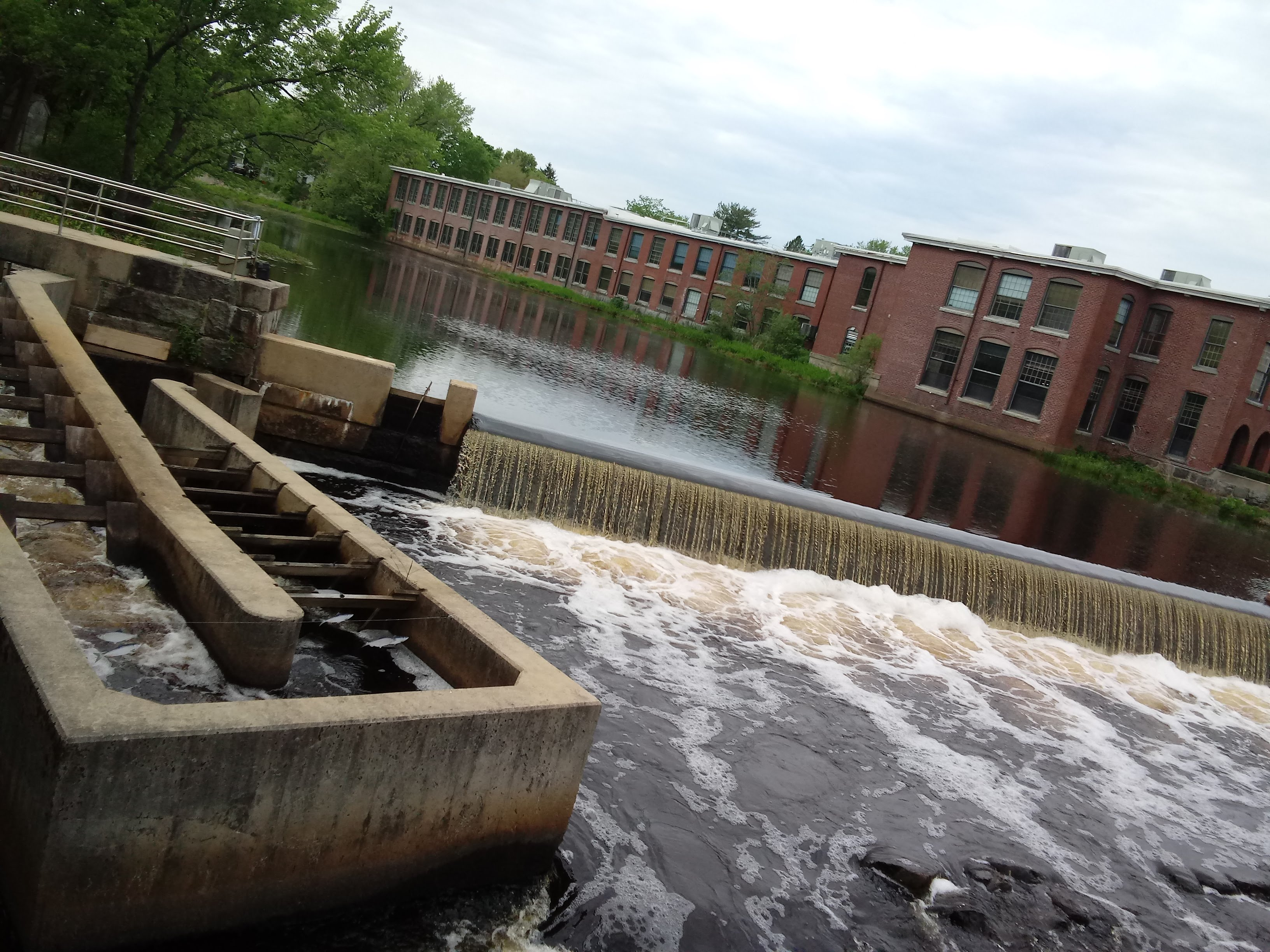
Ipswich Mills Historic District fish ladder

The Ipswich Mill Company was founded in 1868 by Amos Adams Lawrence, and developed this area, which had seen a variety of industrial uses since the 18th century. The company manufactured hosiery, one of the community's early industries, and grew to become the largest hosiery maker in the world between 1916 and 1919, with mills in five New England locations. Demand for the mill's products declined after the First World War, and its mills were shuttered one by one, with the Ipswich mill closing in 1928. The mill complex was acquired by Sylvania Electric in 1941, which was responsible for the demolition of much of the complex in the 1970s.

== See also ==
- 1913 Ipswich Mills strike
- National Register of Historic Places listings in Ipswich, Massachusetts
- National Register of Historic Places listings in Essex County, Massachusetts
