= Brown Stocking Mill Historic District =

Historic district in Massachusetts, United States

- U.S. National Register of Historic Places
- U.S. Historic district
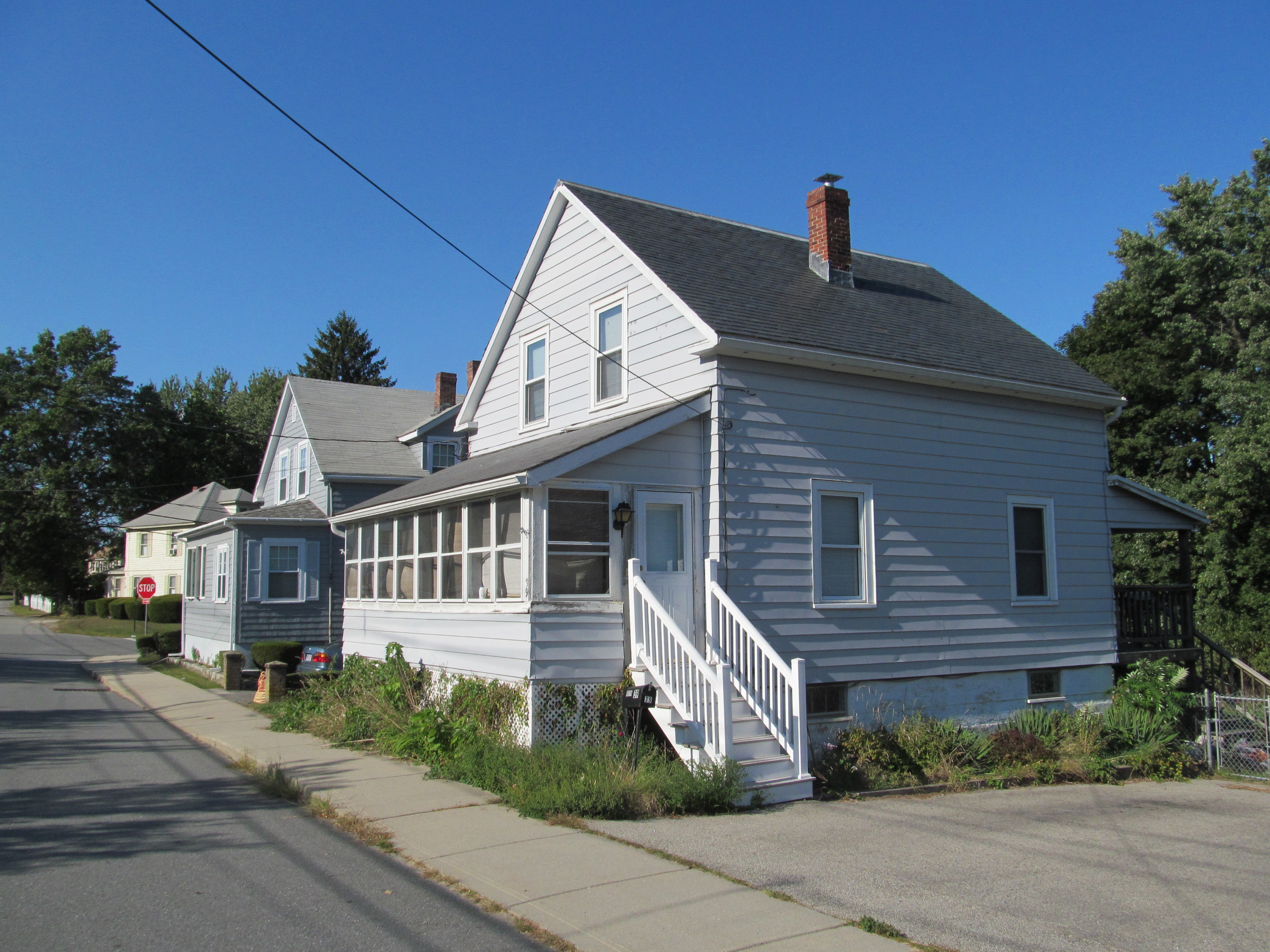
- 39 Brownville Avenue

- Location within Massachusetts Location within the United States
- Location: Ipswich, Massachusetts
- Coordinates: 42°40′38″N 70°50′49″W
- Built: 1907; 119 years ago
- Architectural style: Queen Anne
- NRHP reference No.: 96000924
- Added to NRHP: August 22, 1996

The Brown Stocking Mill Historic District in Ipswich, Massachusetts encompasses the (now demolished) mill building of Harry S. Brown's stocking-making factory, and associated mill worker housing Brown had built. Brown, a supervisor at the Ipswich Mills, established his company in 1906, constructed a factory on Brownville Avenue, and built a series of worker housing units on Brownville and several nearby streets. The historic district was listed on the National Register of Historic Places in 1996. It includes properties at 24—32 Broadway Avenue, 3—41 Brownville Avenue, 10 Burleigh Avenue, 3—5 Burleigh Place, and 35—47 Topsfield Road.

== See also ==
- National Register of Historic Places listings in Ipswich, Massachusetts
- National Register of Historic Places listings in Essex County, Massachusetts
