= Nathaniel Rust Mansion =

Historic house in Massachusetts, United States

- U.S. National Register of Historic Places
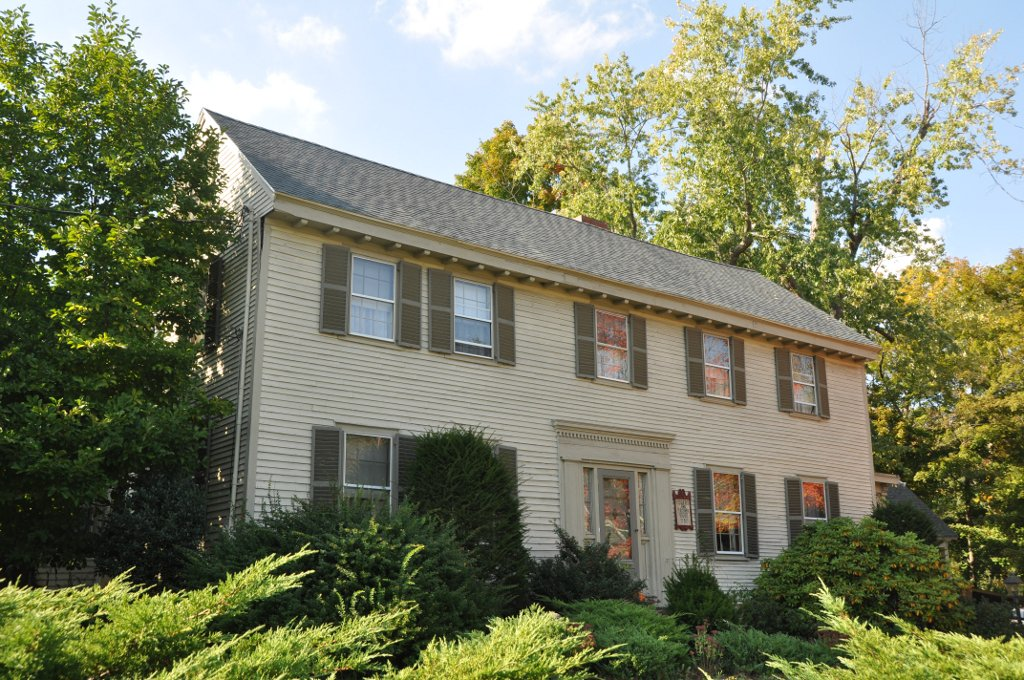

- Location within Massachusetts Location within the United States
- Location: Ipswich, Massachusetts
- Coordinates: 42°40′21″N 70°50′15″W
- Built: r.1665
- Architectural style: Colonial
- MPS: Central Village, Ipswich, Massachusetts MRA
- NRHP reference No.: 80000440
- Added to NRHP: September 17, 1980

The Nathaniel Rust Mansion is a historic house at 83 County Street in Ipswich, Massachusetts. It is a 2 1/2-story colonial style house with First Period origins, indicated in part by its asymmetrical front facade. The date of its construction is uncertain; the first record of the house is its sale by Deacon William Goodhue to Nathaniel Rust, a tanner, in 1665. It was for many years located on the South Green, but was moved to its present location on County Street in 1837 by Asa Brown. Brown at the same time made modifications to the house, giving it its Federalist character. The house is one of the oldest houses in Ipswich that is situated outside one of its central historic districts.

The house was listed on the National Register of Historic Places in 1980.

== See also ==
- National Register of Historic Places listings in Ipswich, Massachusetts
- National Register of Historic Places listings in Essex County, Massachusetts
- List of the oldest buildings in Massachusetts
