= House on Labor-in-Vain Road =

Historic house in Massachusetts, United States

- U.S. National Register of Historic Places
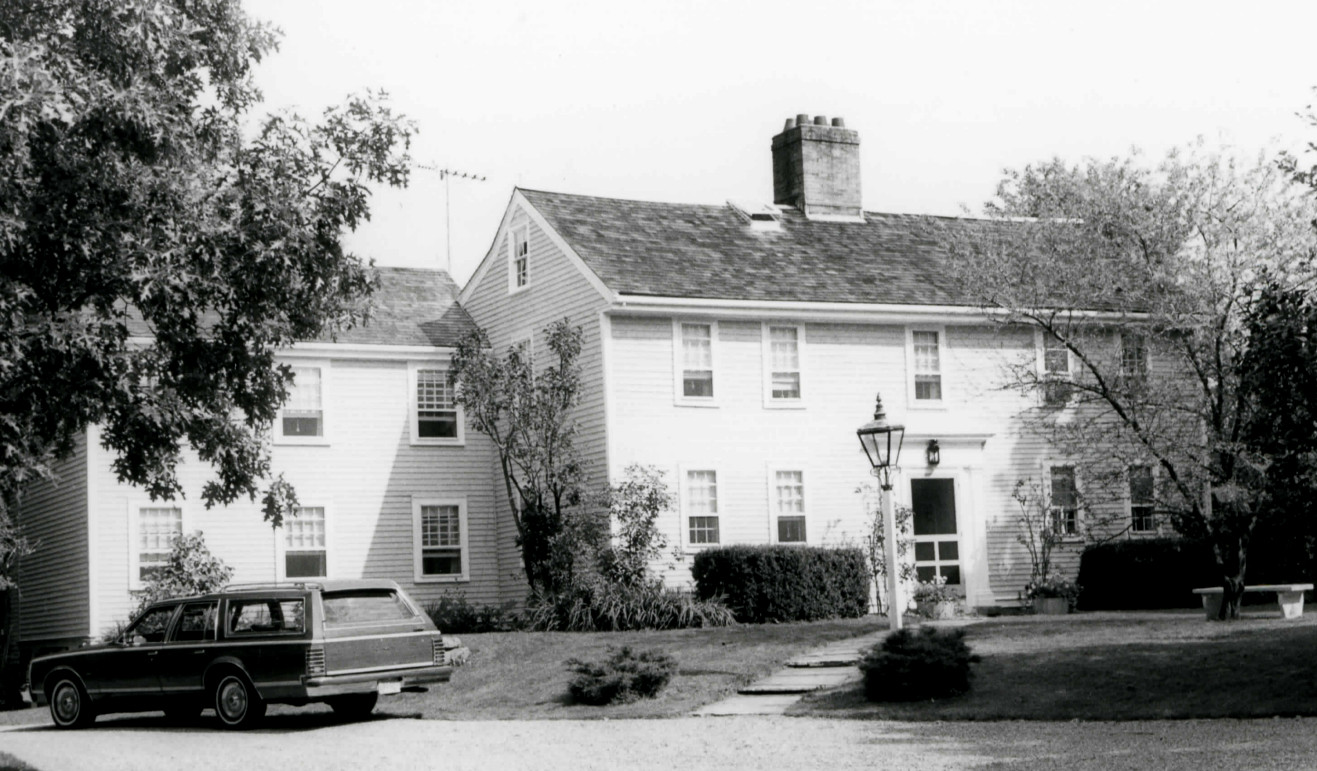
- The house c. 1986

- Location within Massachusetts Location within the United States
- Location: Labor-in-Vain Rd., Ipswich, Massachusetts
- Coordinates: 42°40′40″N 70°48′22″W
- Architectural style: Colonial
- MPS: First Period Buildings of Eastern Massachusetts TR
- NRHP reference No.: 90000234
- Added to NRHP: March 9, 1990

The House on Labor-in-Vain Road is a historic house in Ipswich, Massachusetts. Built about 1720 and enlarged c. 1810, it has a well-preserved assortment of architectural stylistic details predating 1850. It was listed on the National Register of Historic Places in 1990.

== Description and history ==
The House on Labor-in-Vain Road stands at the end of a long private lane (now providing access to several nearby houses) in a high area of the marshlands of eastern Ipswich. The lane forms a southern extension of Labor-in-Vain Road, which provides access to the area from Turkey Shore Road. The house is at the center of what was once an estate of more than 600 acres (240 ha). The main part of the timber-frame house is 2 1/2 stories in height, with a side gable roof, central chimney, and clapboarded exterior. This section shows details of construction that contain both First Period and early Georgian features. The staircase in the front lobby has turned balusters that are possibly original, and are similar in appearance to balusters found at the nearby Smith House on Argilla Road. Both the right-side parlor and second-floor chamber have exposed beams with chamfered corners. The doorway between the parlor and the lobby is topped by a distinctive open latticework transom.

Later period features include paneling on the fireplace surround of the left parlor, and Federal period features on the right parlor fireplace. The house has had three major additions: the first, in 1810, add a wing to the left side of the house, where additional Federal style features are found. A full leanto was added to the house rear around the turn of the 20th century, and another extension was added on the rear, probably when the house was used as clubhouse for a golf club that occupied the estate. The leanto addition included stylistically First Period elements to harmonize with those found in the older part of the house.

== See also ==
- National Register of Historic Places listings in Ipswich, Massachusetts
- National Register of Historic Places listings in Essex County, Massachusetts
