= Meetinghouse Green Historic District =

Historic district in Massachusetts, United States

- U.S. National Register of Historic Places
- U.S. Historic district
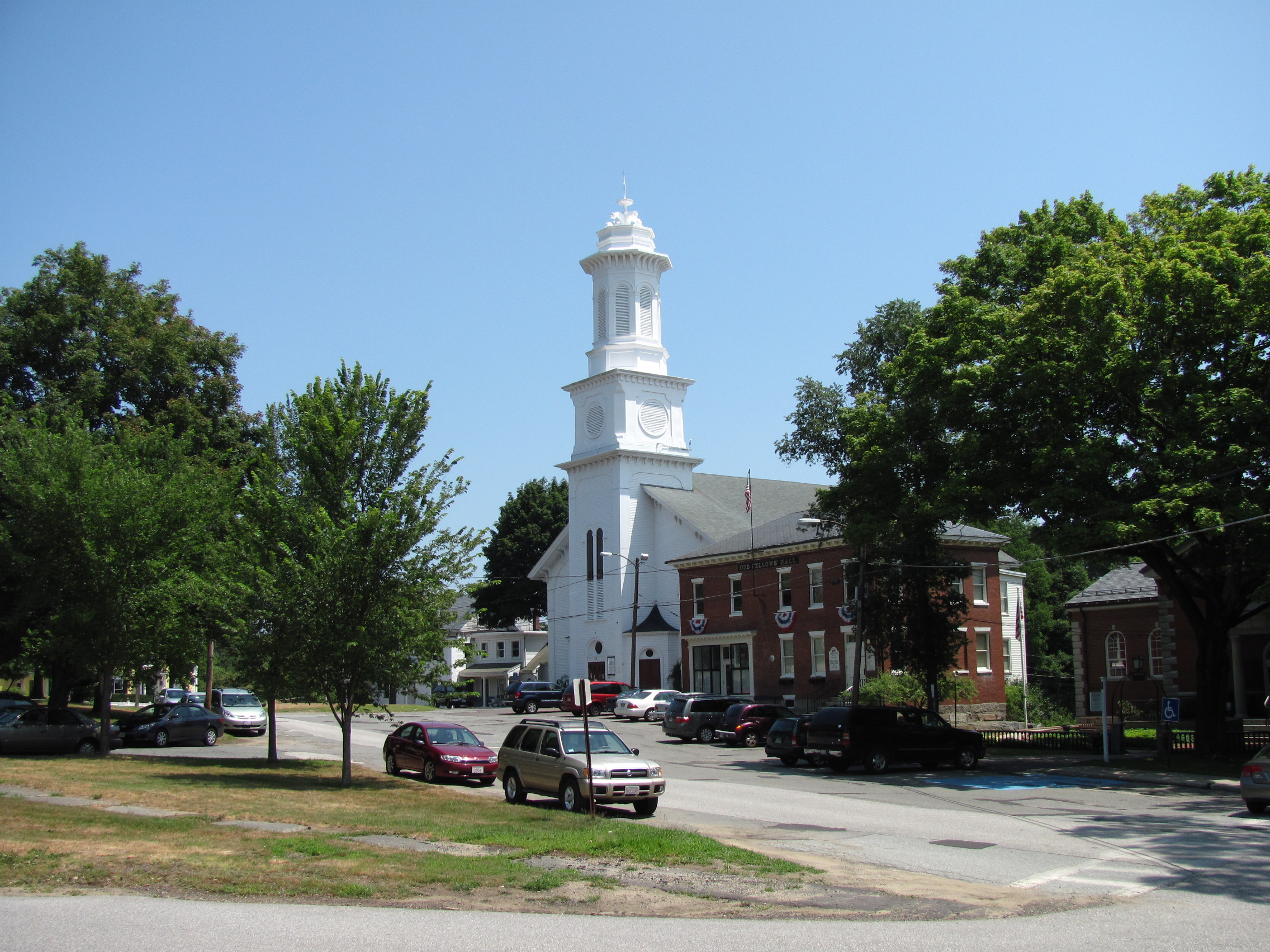
- Odd Fellows Hall and United Methodist Church

- Location within Massachusetts Location within the United States
- Location: Ipswich, Massachusetts
- Coordinates: 42°40′53″N 70°50′11″W
- Built: 1687
- Architect: Multiple
- Architectural style: Colonial Revival, Greek Revival, Queen Anne
- MPS: Central Village, Ipswich, Massachusetts MRA
- NRHP reference No.: 80000464
- Added to NRHP: September 17, 1980

Meetinghouse Green Historic District encompasses the historic 17th century heart of Ipswich, Massachusetts. The district runs along North Main Street, south from its junction with High Street to the southern end of the Meetinghouse Green. It was listed on the National Register of Historic Places in 1980.

The Meetinghouse Green was laid out in 1634, not long after Ipswich was established, and was for many years the heart of its civic life. In addition to private residences, it was flanked by public facilities, including a meeting house, jail fort, and animal pound, as well as the stocks. Although it has since become predominantly residential, it is still the site of churches and the public library.

Most of the thirty properties in the district are residential, with their construction divided between the 18th and 19th centuries. The 18th century houses are mainly Georgian in character, although there are a few houses that have some evidence of First Period origins, despite exterior decorations from a later period. The 19th century buildings are mostly Greek Revival or Italianate in character; there is one Queen Anne house (47 North Main), and one with Second Empire styling (21 North Main).

== See also ==
- High Street Historic District (Ipswich, Massachusetts)
- South Green Historic District (Ipswich, Massachusetts)
- East End Historic District (Ipswich, Massachusetts)
- National Register of Historic Places listings in Ipswich, Massachusetts
- National Register of Historic Places listings in Essex County, Massachusetts
