= Meeting House Green =

Meeting House Green may refer to:

- Meetinghouse Green Historic District, Ipswich, Massachusetts
- The green in Haddam Center Historic District in Connecticut
- Some other specific village green
