= Ross Tavern =

Historic tavern in Massachusetts, United States

- U.S. National Register of Historic Places
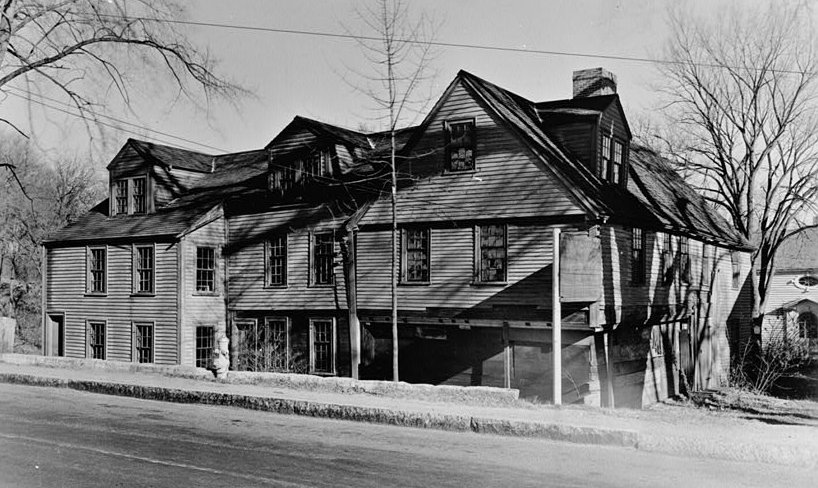
- Ross Tavern in 1936, before it was moved to its present site

- Location within Massachusetts Location within the United States
- Location: 52 Jeffrey's Neck Road, Ipswich, Massachusetts
- Coordinates: 42°41′53″N 70°49′45″W
- Built: r.1680
- Architectural style: Colonial
- MPS: First Period Buildings of Eastern Massachusetts TR
- NRHP reference No.: 90000235
- Added to NRHP: March 9, 1990

The Ross Tavern is a historic building in Ipswich, Massachusetts. Now a private residence, the building was moved to its present site from central Ipswich (adjacent to the Choate Bridge) in 1940, and carefully restored to a First Period appearance. It was listed on the National Register of Historic Places in 1990.

The building has a complicated history, in part because it includes parts of two different structures. A house was built c. 1680 in downtown Ipswich, and moved near the Choate Bridge in 1735. This house, known as the Ross Tavern, remained at that site until it was disassembled and moved to Jeffrey's Neck by Daniel Stone Wendel, an amateur architectural historian, in 1940. Wendel was the son of local American Impressionist Artist Theodore Wendel. Nothing is known of its original owners. Wendel joined the tavern to a second house, the c. 1675–1700 Lord-Collins House, that he also moved to the site. This house is one of a very few First Period homes to provide evidence of a transom window.

== See also ==
- National Register of Historic Places listings in Ipswich, Massachusetts
- National Register of Historic Places listings in Essex County, Massachusetts
