= Bailey House (Ipswich, Massachusetts) =

Historic house in Massachusetts, United States

- U.S. National Register of Historic Places
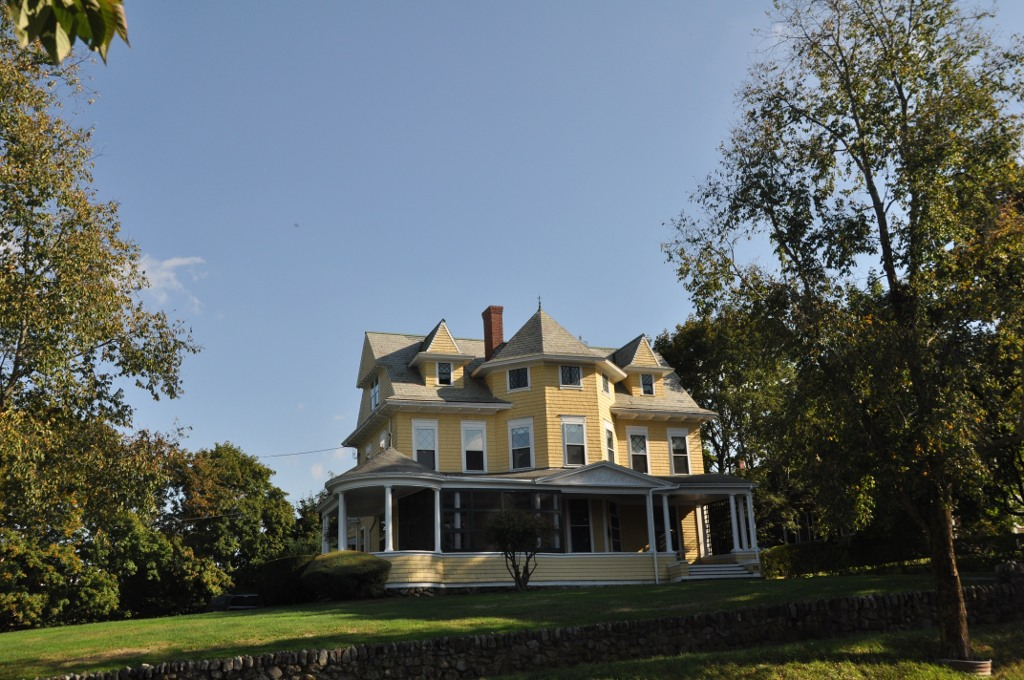

- Location within Massachusetts Location within the United States
- Location: Ipswich, Massachusetts
- Coordinates: 42°40′43″N 70°50′24″W
- Built: 1900
- Architectural style: Queen Anne
- MPS: Central Village, Ipswich, Massachusetts MRA
- NRHP reference No.: 80000457
- Added to NRHP: September 17, 1980

The Bailey House is a historic house in Ipswich, Massachusetts. It was built sometime between 1893 and 1910 to serve as the home and office Doctor Bailey, a prominent local physician. It is sited on a hill overlooking the central downtown area of Ipswich. The 2 1/2-story house is one of the most elaborate examples of Queen Anne/Colonial Revival architecture in central Ipswich. Roughly rectangular in plan, a veranda embellished with Colonial Revival details wraps around the north and west sides of the house. The central portion of the front is a protruding bay that also rises up through the bottom of the roof and is topped by a turret shaped gable extension. It is flanked on either side by small gable dormers.

The house was listed on the National Register of Historic Places in 1980.

== See also ==
- National Register of Historic Places listings in Ipswich, Massachusetts
- National Register of Historic Places listings in Essex County, Massachusetts
