= National Register of Historic Places listings in Ipswich, Massachusetts =

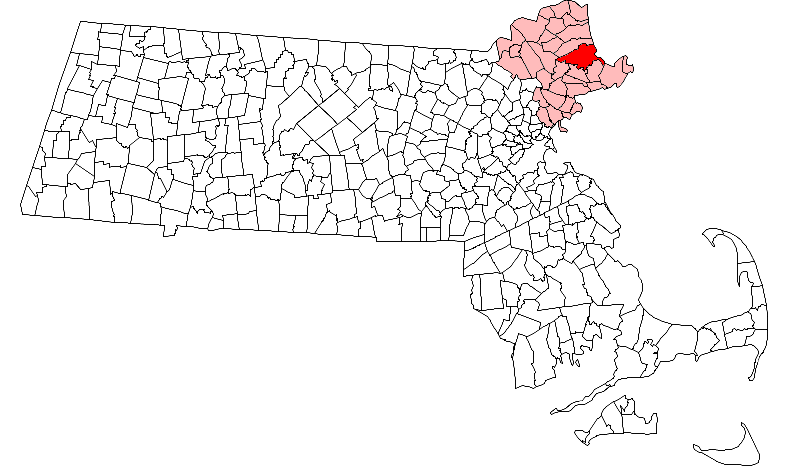
Location of Ipswich in Massachusetts

This is a list of the National Register of Historic Places listings in Ipswich, Massachusetts.

This is intended to be a complete list of the properties and districts on the National Register of Historic Places in Ipswich, Massachusetts, United States. The locations of National Register properties and districts for which the latitude and longitude coordinates are included below, may be seen in an online map.

Essex County, of which Ipswich is a part, is the location of 461 properties and districts listed on the National Register. Ipswich itself is the location of 31 of these properties and districts.

This National Park Service list is complete through NPS recent listings posted May 1, 2026.

== Current listings ==
	Name on the Register	Image	Date listed	Location	Description
1	Bailey House	Bailey House	September 17, 1980 (#80000457)	40 Market St. 42°40′43″N 70°50′24″W	
2	Brown Stocking Mill Historic District	Brown Stocking Mill Historic District	August 22, 1996 (#96000924)	24-32 Broadway Ave., 3-41 Brownville Ave., 10 Burleigh Ave., 3-5 Burleigh Pl., and 35-47 Topsfield Rd. 42°40′38″N 70°50′49″W	
3	Brown's Manor	Brown's Manor	September 17, 1980 (#80000459)	115 High St. 42°41′20″N 70°50′58″W	
4	James Burnham House	James Burnham House	March 9, 1990 (#90000236)	37 Heartbreak Rd. 42°39′53″N 70°49′49″W	
5	Burnham-Patch House	Burnham-Patch House	September 17, 1980 (#80000452)	1 Turkey Shore Rd. 42°40′35″N 70°50′01″W	
6	Benjamin Stickney Cable Memorial Hospital	Benjamin Stickney Cable Memorial Hospital	May 10, 1990 (#90000683)	Junction of MA 1A and MA 133; 42°39′59″N 70°50′15″W	
7	Caldwell Block	Caldwell Block	July 7, 1983 (#83003434)	S. Main St. 42°40′46″N 70°50′17″W	
8	Dr. John Calef House	Dr. John Calef House	September 17, 1980 (#80000447)	7 Poplar St. 42°40′33″N 70°50′05″W	
9	Castle Hill	Castle Hill	December 2, 1977 (#77000183)	East of Ipswich on Argilla Rd. 42°41′09″N 70°45′53″W	
10	Choate Bridge	Choate Bridge	August 21, 1972 (#72000137)	MA 133/1A (S. Main St.) over the Ipswich River; 42°40′46″N 70°50′16″W	
11	East End Historic District	East End Historic District	September 17, 1980 (#80000461)	East St. 42°40′57″N 70°49′54″W	
12	Giddings-Burnham House	Giddings-Burnham House	March 9, 1990 (#90000233)	37 Argilla Rd. 42°40′25″N 70°49′54″W	
13	Isaac Goodale House	Isaac Goodale House	March 9, 1990 (#90000232)	153 Argilla Rd. 42°39′38″N 70°47′58″W	
14	Benjamin Grant House	Benjamin Grant House	September 17, 1980 (#80000449)	47 County St. 42°40′41″N 70°50′09″W	
15	Heard-Lakeman House	Heard-Lakeman House	September 17, 1980 (#80000441)	2 Turkey Shore Rd. 42°40′35″N 70°50′03″W	
16	High Street Historic District	High Street Historic District	September 17, 1980 (#80000454)	High St. 42°41′07″N 70°50′28″W	
17	House on Labor-in-Vain Road	House on Labor-in-Vain Road	March 9, 1990 (#90000234)	Labor in Vain Rd. 42°40′40″N 70°48′22″W	
18	Howe Barn	Howe Barn	March 9, 1990 (#90000230)	421 Linebrook Rd. 42°40′38″N 70°56′07″W	Listed at 403 Linebrook Rd; this is a 17th-century barn that was converted to a house in 1948.
19	Ipswich Mills Historic District	Ipswich Mills Historic District	August 22, 1996 (#96000923)	Roughly bounded by Union St., Boston and Maine railroad tracks, and the Ipswich River; 42°40′33″N 70°50′24″W	
20	Thomas Low House	Thomas Low House	March 9, 1990 (#90000237)	36 Heartbreak Rd. 42°39′49″N 70°49′43″W	
21	Meetinghouse Green Historic District	Meetinghouse Green Historic District	September 17, 1980 (#80000464)	N. Main St. 42°40′53″N 70°50′11″W	
22	Merrifield House	Merrifield House	September 17, 1980 (#80000469)	11 Woods Lane; 42°40′39″N 70°49′51″W	
23	Paine-Dodge House	Paine-Dodge House	March 9, 1990 (#90000231)	49 Jeffrey's Neck Rd. 42°41′36″N 70°49′00″W	On The Trustees of Reservations Greenwood Farm property.
24	Ross Tavern	Ross Tavern	March 9, 1990 (#90000235)	52 Jeffrey's Neck Rd. 42°41′53″N 70°49′45″W	
25	Nathaniel Rust Mansion	Nathaniel Rust Mansion	September 17, 1980 (#80000440)	83 County St. 42°40′21″N 70°50′15″W	
26	Smith House	Smith House	March 9, 1990 (#90000238)	168 Argilla Rd. 42°40′16″N 70°47′40″W	Listed at 142 Argilla Rd.
27	South Green Historic District	South Green Historic District	September 17, 1980 (#80000471)	MA 1A; 42°40′32″N 70°50′13″W	
28	Turner Hill	Turner Hill	November 26, 1982 (#82000483)	315 Topsfield Rd. 42°39′48″N 70°52′59″W	
29	Wade House	Wade House	September 17, 1980 (#80000467)	9 Woods Lane; 42°40′35″N 70°49′53″W	
30	John Whipple House	John Whipple House	October 15, 1966 (#66000791)	53 S. Main St. 42°40′34″N 70°50′11″W	
31	Shoreborne Wilson House	Shoreborne Wilson House	September 17, 1980 (#80000456)	4 S. Main St. 42°40′44″N 70°50′14″W	

== See also ==
- List of National Historic Landmarks in Massachusetts
- National Register of Historic Places listings in Massachusetts
- National Register of Historic Places listings in Essex County, Massachusetts
