= Caldwell Block =

- U.S. National Register of Historic Places
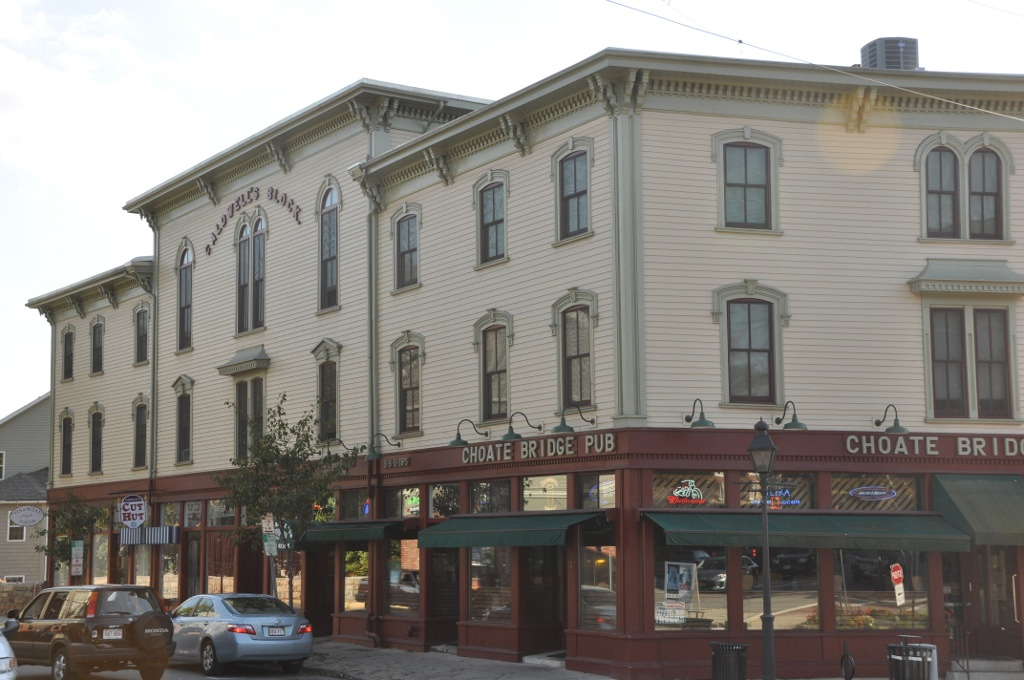

- Location within Massachusetts Location within the United States
- Location: Ipswich, Massachusetts
- Coordinates: 42°40′46″N 70°50′17″W
- Built: 1870
- Architectural style: Italianate
- MPS: Central Village, Ipswich, Massachusetts MRA
- NRHP reference No.: 83003434
- Added to NRHP: July 7, 1983

The Caldwell Block is a historic block on S. Main Street in Ipswich, Massachusetts. It is the oldest surviving building in Ipswich that was designed as a commercial and retail space, and is still used for that purpose. It is located prominently in the center of Ipswich, at the junction of North and South Main Streets, and Central and Market Streets. It was built in 1870 by Luther Caldwell, on the site of an old woolen mill that was destroyed by fire a few years earlier, and features Italianate styling. The building has always housed retail stores on the ground floor and office space above. It is notable as the location of the offices of writer John Updike between 1961 and 1974, when he wrote many of his works there.

The building was listed on the National Register of Historic Places in 1983.

== See also ==
- National Register of Historic Places listings in Ipswich, Massachusetts
- National Register of Historic Places listings in Essex County, Massachusetts
