= Isaac Goodale House =

Historic house in Massachusetts, United States

- U.S. National Register of Historic Places
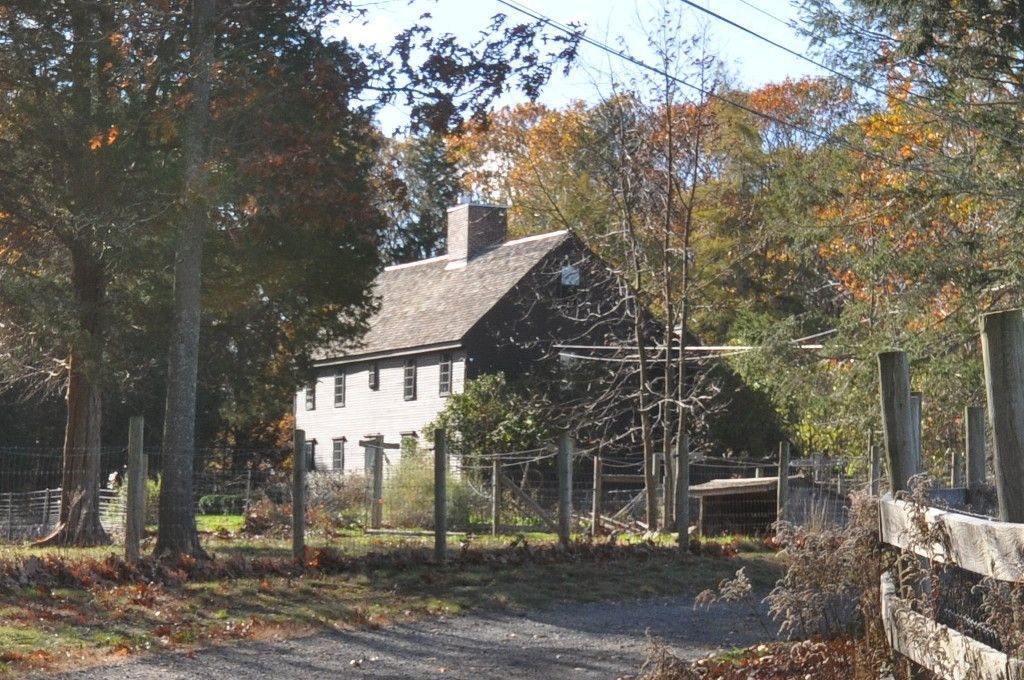

- Location within Massachusetts Location within the United States
- Location: 153 Argilla Rd., Ipswich, Massachusetts
- Coordinates: 42°39′38″N 70°47′58″W
- Built: c. 1690–1700
- Architectural style: Colonial
- MPS: First Period Buildings of Eastern Massachusetts TR
- NRHP reference No.: 90000232
- Added to NRHP: March 9, 1990

The Isaac Goodale House is a historic house in Ipswich, Massachusetts. Built about 1700, the house has many original First Period elements, despite its relocation to its present location in 1928. The house was listed on the National Register of Historic Places in 1990, and is the subject of a preservation easement held by the Ipswich Historic Commission.

== Description and history ==
The Isaac Goodale House is set on a remote lot at the end of a private lane that runs to the rear of Goodale, now Russell Orchards on the south side of Argilla Road. It is situated facing east toward salt marshes of a small tidal river. It is a 2 1/2-story timber-framed structure, with a gabled roof, central chimney, and clapboarded exterior. It has many surviving interior First Period elements, including chamfered beams and board and batten doors. The windows are reproductions; according to architectural historian Anne Grady, "old leading and glass found in the cellar formed the model for the new leaded glass windows" as part of a 1929 restoration.

By tradition, Robert Goodale moved from Salem to what is now Peabody in 1669 and built the house for his son Isaac shortly thereafter. Stylistic features place the construction date closer to 1700, and it was more likely built by Isaac Goodale c. 1695. The house was moved to Ipswich by their descendant, Dr. Robert Goodale and his family in 1928, its reconstruction overseen by preservationist Eugene Dow.

The house was added to the National Register of Historic Places in 1990. After 300 years of almost continuous ownership by the Goodales, the property was sold to another family.

== See also ==
- List of the oldest buildings in Massachusetts
- National Register of Historic Places listings in Ipswich, Massachusetts
- National Register of Historic Places listings in Essex County, Massachusetts
