= Benjamin Grant House =

Historic house in Massachusetts, United States

- U.S. National Register of Historic Places
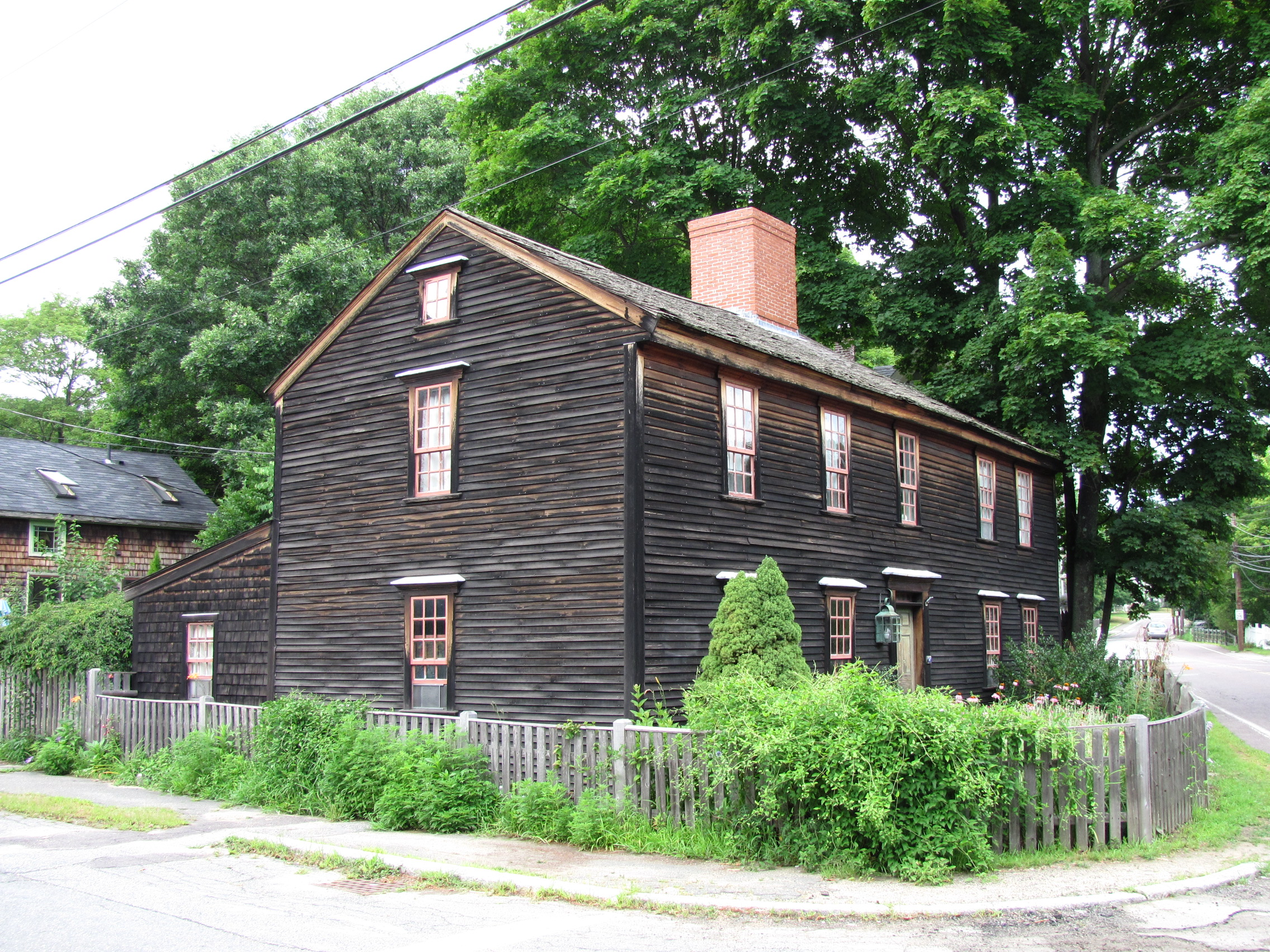
- Benjamin Grant House

- Location within Massachusetts Location within the United States
- Location: Ipswich, Massachusetts
- Coordinates: 42°40′41″N 70°50′9″W
- Built: 1735
- Architectural style: Colonial
- MPS: Central Village, Ipswich, Massachusetts MRA
- NRHP reference No.: 80000449
- Added to NRHP: September 17, 1980

The Benjamin Grant House is a historic house at 47 County Street in Ipswich, Massachusetts. It is a well-preserved early Georgian house, built c. 1735 by Benjamin Grant. He was killed in the French and Indian War, and the house subsequently came into the hands of the Ross family, who owned it well into the 20th century. The house is a 2 1/2-story colonial with a central chimney. The front portion of the house consists of two rooms, one on either side of the chimney, behind which is a single-story leanto addition. The interior of the house has remained well preserved, showing numerous Georgian details.

The house was listed on the National Register of Historic Places in 1980, and is subject to a local preservation restriction.

== See also ==
- National Register of Historic Places listings in Ipswich, Massachusetts
- National Register of Historic Places listings in Essex County, Massachusetts
