= Thomas Low House =

Historic house in Massachusetts, United States

- U.S. National Register of Historic Places
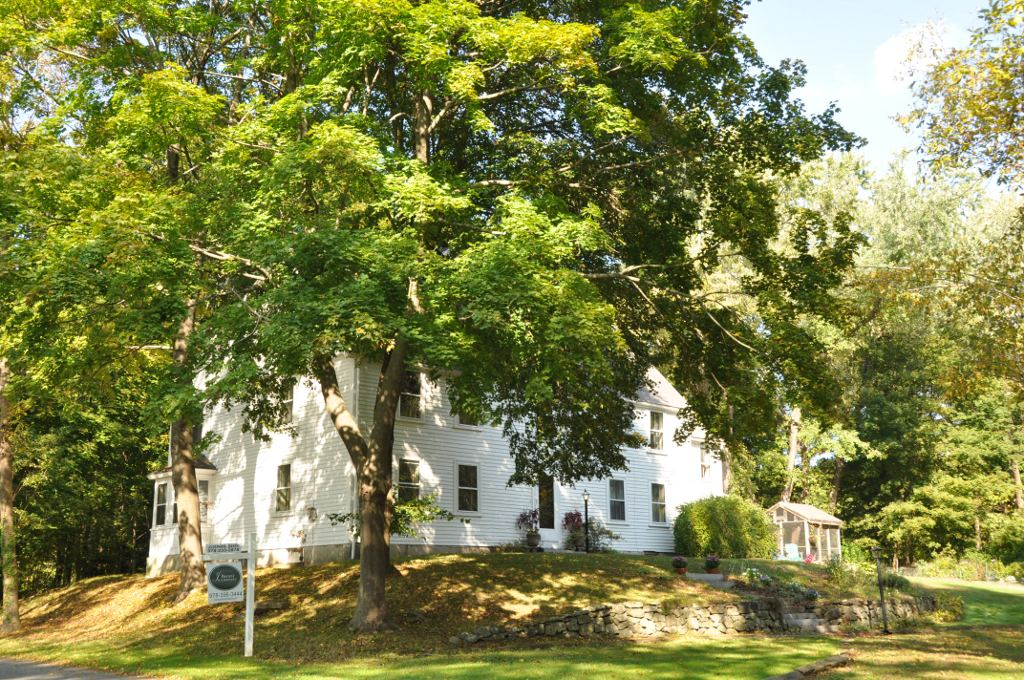

- Location within Massachusetts Location within the United States
- Location: 42 Heartbreak Rd., Ipswich, Massachusetts
- Coordinates: 42°39′49″N 70°49′43″W
- Built: 1700
- Architectural style: Federal
- MPS: First Period Buildings of Eastern Massachusetts TR
- NRHP reference No.: 90000237
- Added to NRHP: March 9, 1990

The Thomas Low House is a historic house in Ipswich, Massachusetts. It is a 2 1/2-story wood-frame house, with a symmetrically windowed five-bay main facade, a rear two-story addition, and a second two-story addition on the right side. The house is first mentioned in a 1708 deed, when it was transferred from John Low to his brother Thorndike. The house has only very minor evidence of its First Period origin. It began as a two-story structure with two rooms on each floor and a chimney between. A leanto addition came at a later date, and was raised to a full second story sometime in the 18th century. The addition on the right side is modern (1981), but is built on the footprint of an older addition. The house was complete restyled during the Federalist period.

The house was listed on the National Register of Historic Places in 1990.

== See also ==
- National Register of Historic Places listings in Ipswich, Massachusetts
- National Register of Historic Places listings in Essex County, Massachusetts
