= Benjamin Stickney Cable Memorial Hospital =

Geography
- Location: Ipswich, Massachusetts, United States
- Coordinates: 42°39′59″N 70°50′15″W

History
- Constructed: 1917
- Closed: 1980

Links
- Lists: Hospitals in Massachusetts
- Benjamin Stickney Cable Memorial Hospital
- U.S. National Register of Historic Places
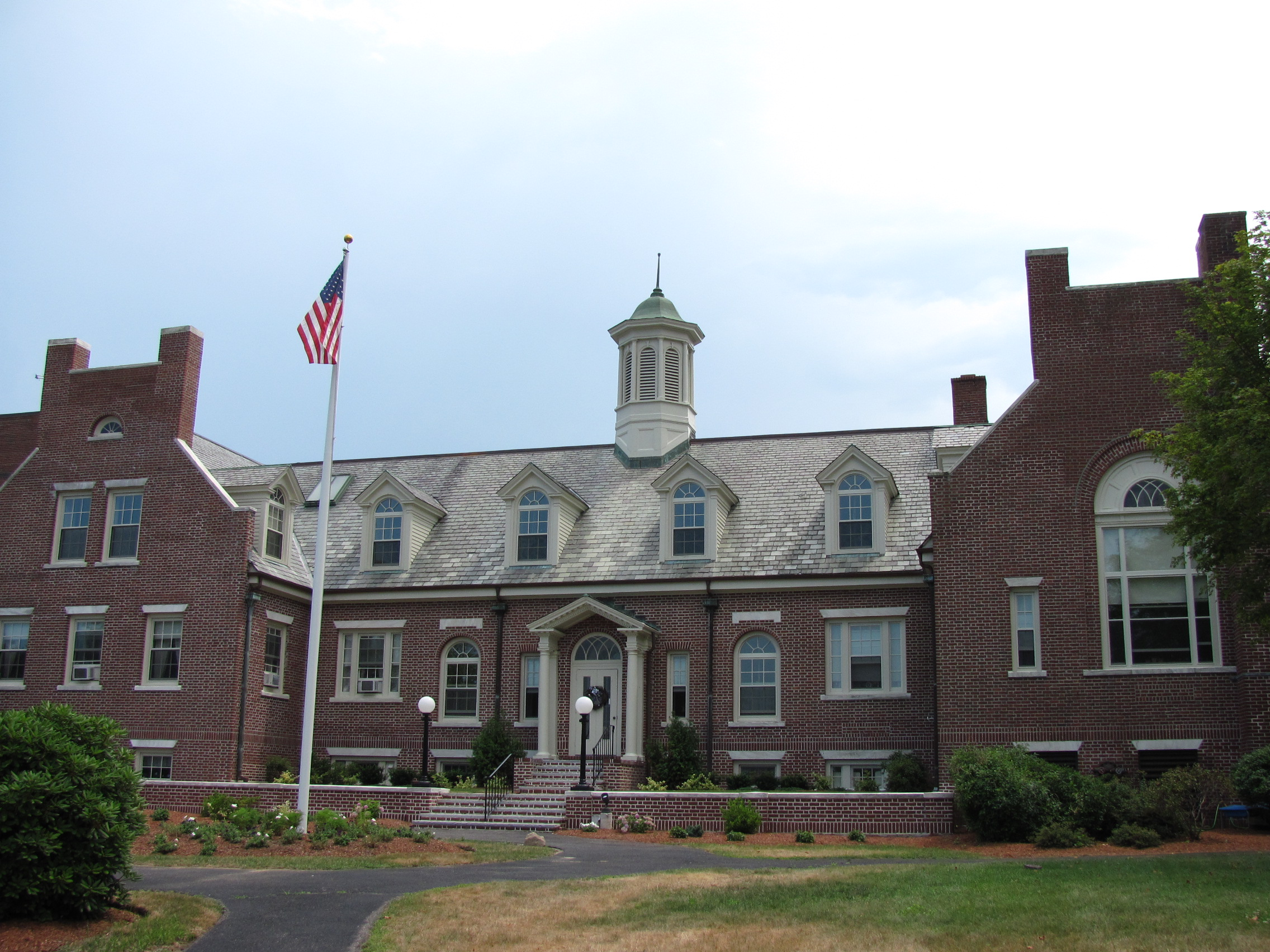
- Benjamin Stickney Cable Memorial Hospital

- Location within Massachusetts Location within the United States
- Location: Ipswich, Massachusetts
- Built: 1917
- Architect: Stevens, Edward E.; Shurtleff, Arthur A., Et al.
- Architectural style: Colonial Revival
- NRHP reference No.: 90000683
- Added to NRHP: May 10, 1990

The Benjamin Stickney Cable Memorial Hospital is a historic hospital building at the junction of Massachusetts routes 1A and 133 in Ipswich, Massachusetts, U.S. The Colonial Revival building was built in 1917, following an extended fundraising effort, begun in 1906 and pushed further along by philanthropist and Castle Hill owner Richard T. Crane, Jr., after the 1915 death in a car accident of his friend, Benjamin Stickney Cable. Crane purchased the land on which the building sits and made a further donation of $145,000 to the construction fund.

The building was designed by noted hospital architect Edward F. Stevens in a Georgian Revival style designed to harmonize with the rich colonial heritage of Ipswich. The original part of the building is a 2 1/2-story brick-and-terracotta structure in the shape of an H. A major addition in 1961 added a wing to the east side of the building, doubling the available space from 20 to 41 beds, and a dining hall was built into the slope of a hill on the east side of the patients' terrace at the rear of the original building. The most notable architectural parts of the building interior are Memorial Hall and the patients' day room, both richly detailed with paneled wainscoting, leaded-glass French doors, and ornate crown molding.

The hospital closed its doors in 1980, and the building was converted to apartments in the late 1980s. It was listed on the National Register of Historic Places in 1990, although the 1961 additions do not contribute to this listing.

== See also ==
- National Register of Historic Places listings in Ipswich, Massachusetts
- National Register of Historic Places listings in Essex County, Massachusetts
