= Heard-Lakeman House =

Historic house in Massachusetts, United States

- U.S. National Register of Historic Places
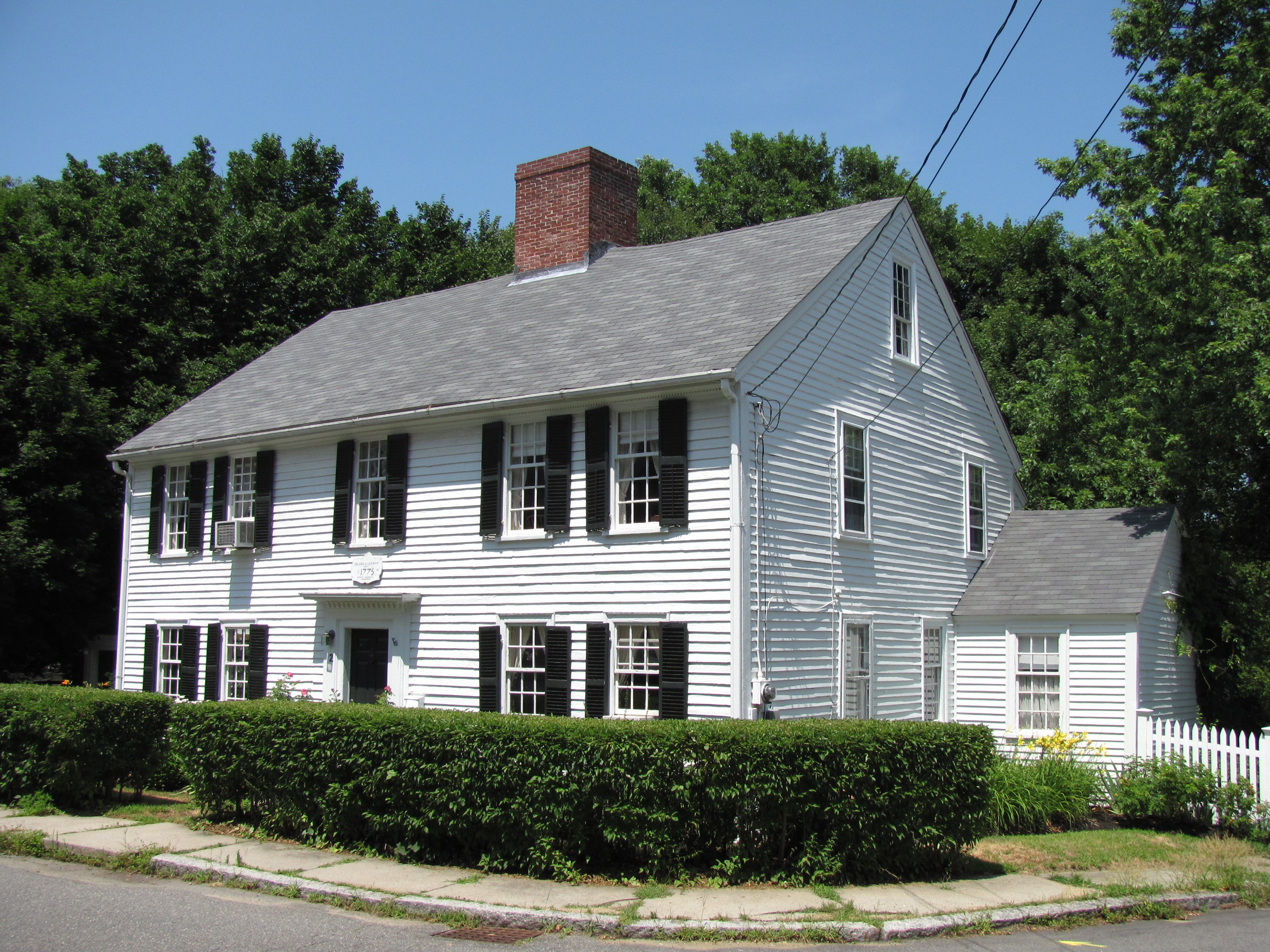
- Heard-Lakeman House

- Location within Massachusetts Location within the United States
- Location: Ipswich, Massachusetts
- Coordinates: 42°40′35″N 70°50′3″W
- Built: 1776
- Architectural style: Colonial
- MPS: Central Village, Ipswich, Massachusetts MRA
- NRHP reference No.: 80000441
- Added to NRHP: September 17, 1980

The Heard-Lakeman House is a historic house at 2 Turkey Shore Road in Ipswich, Massachusetts. Nathaniel and John Heard built this 2 1/2-story wood-frame house in 1776 for Nathaniel to live in. He sold it in 1795 to Richard Lakeman III, member of a seafaring family. The house is notable for an extremely large chimney with an arched foundation over 11 feet (3.4 m) long, which supports two large fireplaces. The building was a notable object of restoration during the Colonial Revival in the 1920s.

The house was added to the National Register of Historic Places in 1980, and is subject to local preservation restrictions.

== See also ==
- National Register of Historic Places listings in Ipswich, Massachusetts
- National Register of Historic Places listings in Essex County, Massachusetts
