= Howe Barn =

Historic barn in Massachusetts, United States

- U.S. National Register of Historic Places
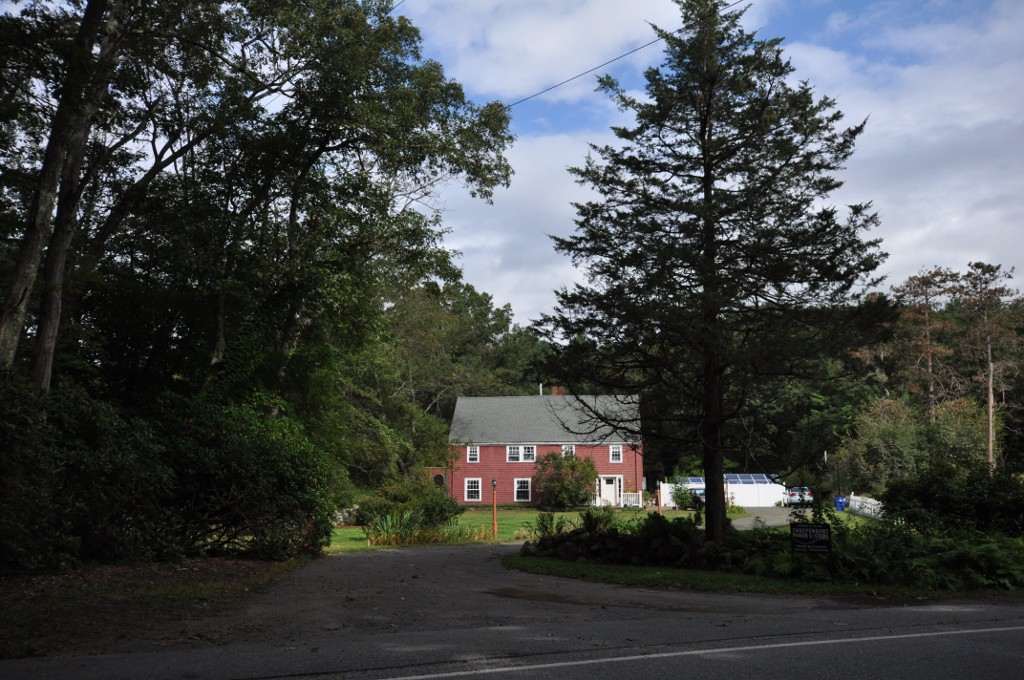

- Location within Massachusetts Location within the United States
- Location: 421 Linebrook Road, Ipswich, Massachusetts
- Coordinates: 42°40′38″N 70°56′7″W
- Built: 1853
- Architectural style: Colonial Revival, Colonial
- MPS: First Period Buildings of Eastern Massachusetts TR
- NRHP reference No.: 90000230
- Added to NRHP: March 9, 1990

The Howe Barn is a historic barn, that has been converted into a house, in Ipswich, Massachusetts, United States. It is important as one of a small number of surviving First Period barn frames in Essex County. Family tradition places the construction of the barn to c. 1711 by Abraham Howe, an early settler of the Linebrook Road area. Elements of the frame, which are still visible in the attic and some areas left exposed during the 1948 conversion to a house, bear some resemblance to a similar period barn at the Stanley Lake House in nearby Topsfield.

The building was listed on the National Register of Historic Places in 1990.

== See also ==
- National Register of Historic Places listings in Ipswich, Massachusetts
- National Register of Historic Places listings in Essex County, Massachusetts
