= Brown's Manor =

Historic house in Massachusetts, United States

- U.S. National Register of Historic Places
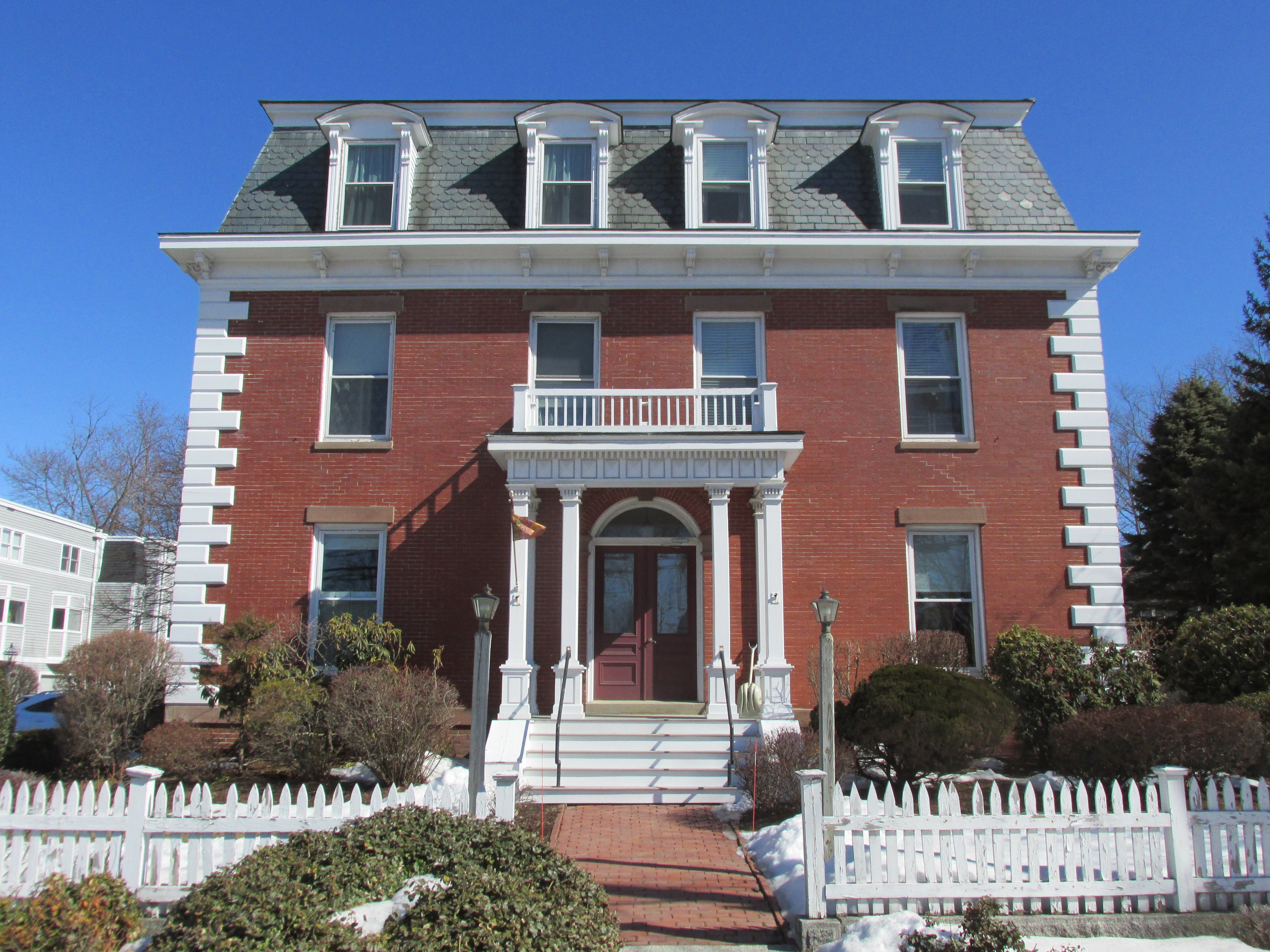
- Brown's Manor

- Location within Massachusetts Location within the United States
- Location: Ipswich, Massachusetts
- Coordinates: 42°41′20″N 70°50′58″W
- Area: less than one acre
- Built: 1886
- Architectural style: Second Empire
- MPS: Central Village, Ipswich, Massachusetts MRA
- NRHP reference No.: 80000459
- Added to NRHP: September 17, 1980

Brown's Manor is a historic house at 115 High Street in Ipswich, Massachusetts. It is a 2 1/2-story Second Empire structure, with brick walls decorated with wooden trim, and a mansard roof pierced by segmented-arch dormers. The building corners have white-painted wood quoining, and the front entrance, set in a round-arch opening, is sheltered by a porch supported by grouped paneled columns. The house was built about 1886, probably by George Brown, who purchased the property that year. Brown was from a family known locally for its house-building skills.

The house was listed on the National Register of Historic Places in 1980.

== See also ==
- National Register of Historic Places listings in Ipswich, Massachusetts
- National Register of Historic Places listings in Essex County, Massachusetts
