= Merrifield House =

Historic house in Massachusetts, United States

- U.S. National Register of Historic Places
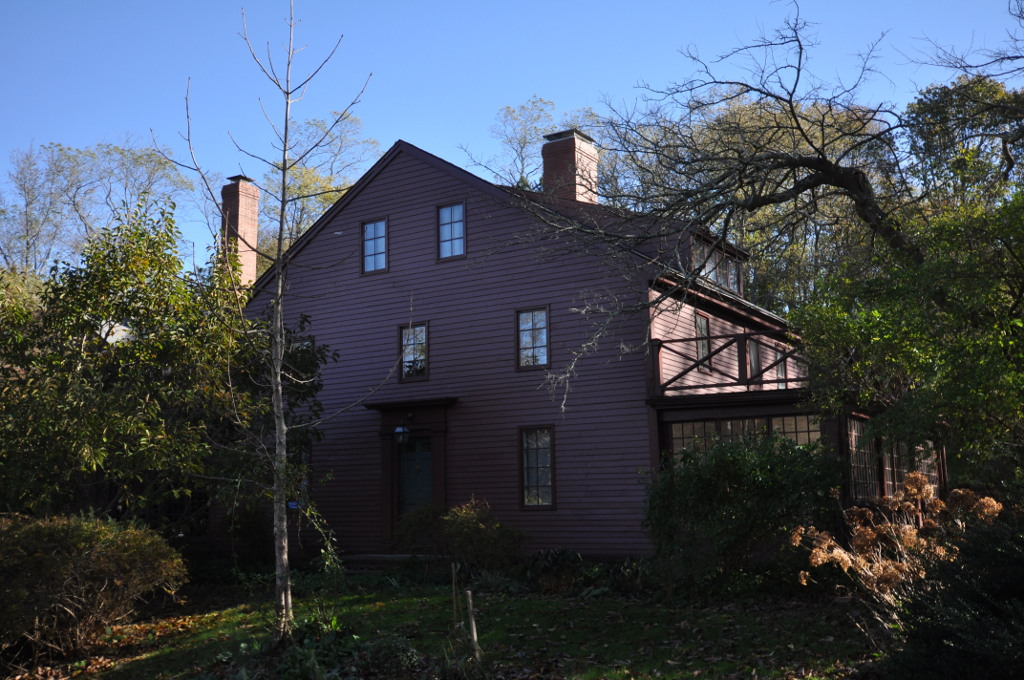

- Location within Massachusetts Location within the United States
- Location: 11 Woods Ln., Ipswich, Massachusetts
- Coordinates: 42°40′39″N 70°49′51.1″W
- Built: 1792
- Architectural style: Federal
- MPS: Central Village, Ipswich, Massachusetts MRA
- NRHP reference No.: 80000469
- Added to NRHP: September 17, 1980

The Merrifield House, also known as Rosebank, is a historic house at 11 Woods Lane in Ipswich, Massachusetts. It was built c. 1792 by Francis Merrifield, Jr., a veteran of the American Revolutionary War. The main block of the house is a 2.5 story, nearly square, wood-frame structure with an off-center chimney. The house has a number of rambling additions, some of which may have been built by Merrifield to accommodate his large family. It is also somewhat unusual in having a second cooking fireplace in its second level.

The house was listed on the National Register of Historic Places in 1980.

== See also ==
- National Register of Historic Places listings in Ipswich, Massachusetts
- National Register of Historic Places listings in Essex County, Massachusetts
