= Shoreborne Wilson House =

Historic house in Massachusetts, United States

- U.S. National Register of Historic Places
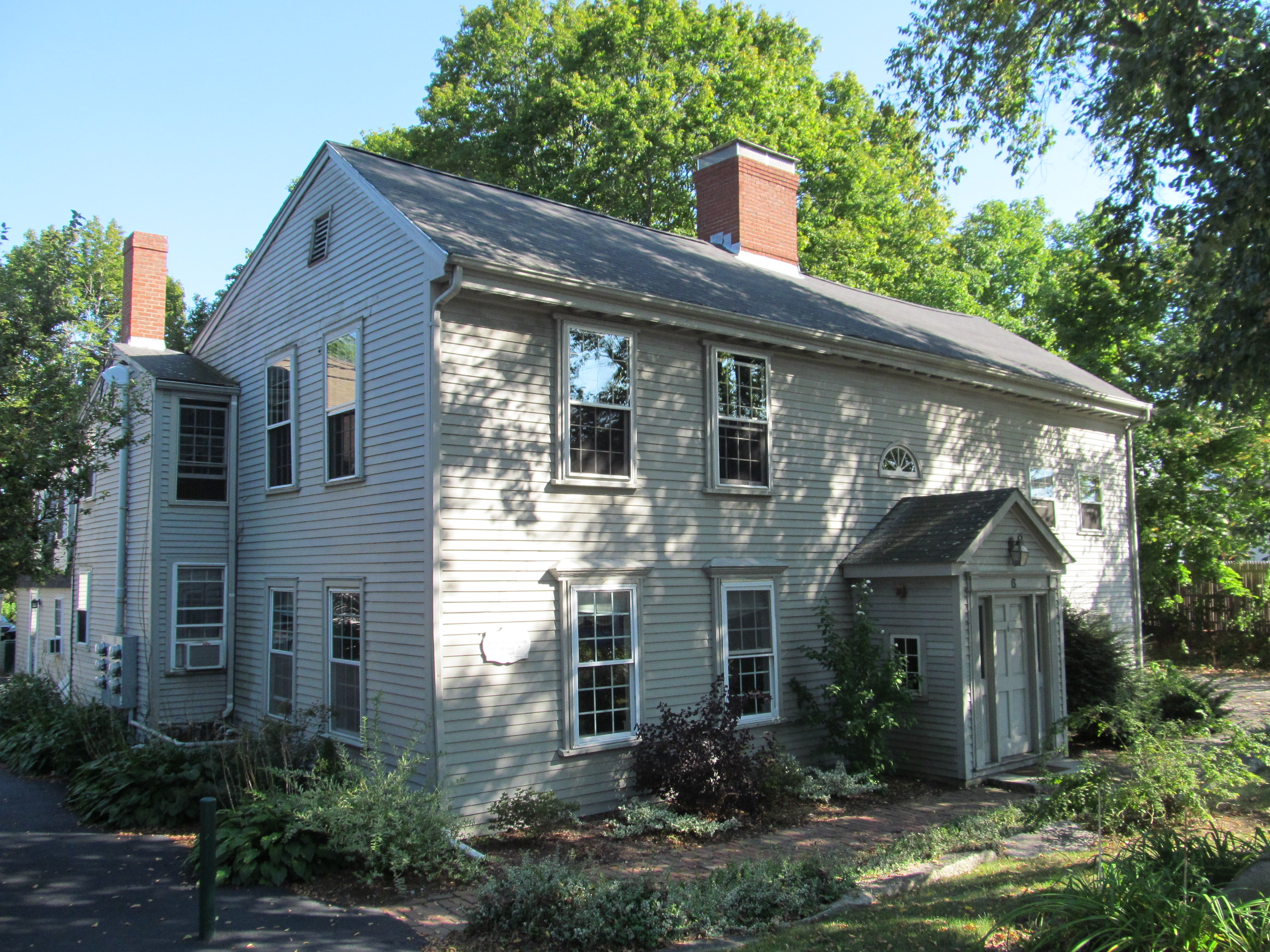
- Shoreborne Wilson House

- Location within Massachusetts Location within the United States
- Location: Ipswich, Massachusetts
- Coordinates: 42°40′44″N 70°50′14″W
- Built: 1685
- Architectural style: Colonial
- MPS: Central Village, Ipswich, Massachusetts MRA
- NRHP reference No.: 80000456
- Added to NRHP: September 17, 1980

The Shoreborne Wilson House is a historic colonial house at 4 South Main Street in Ipswich, Massachusetts. The 2 1/2-story wood-frame house was built between 1685 and 1692 by Shoreborne Wilson, a cooper. It has a basic four-room center chimney plan, of which Wilson built the northwest section. The house was acquired by Captain Samuel Appleton in 1702, who likely built the southeast section. In the following years the house went through a variety of uses. It underwent a restoration of sorts in the 1920s, in which fireplaces and trim details were replaced.

The house was listed on the National Register of Historic Places in 1980.

== See also ==
- National Register of Historic Places listings in Ipswich, Massachusetts
- National Register of Historic Places listings in Essex County, Massachusetts
