= East End Historic District (Ipswich, Massachusetts) =

Historic district in Massachusetts, United States

- U.S. National Register of Historic Places
- U.S. Historic district
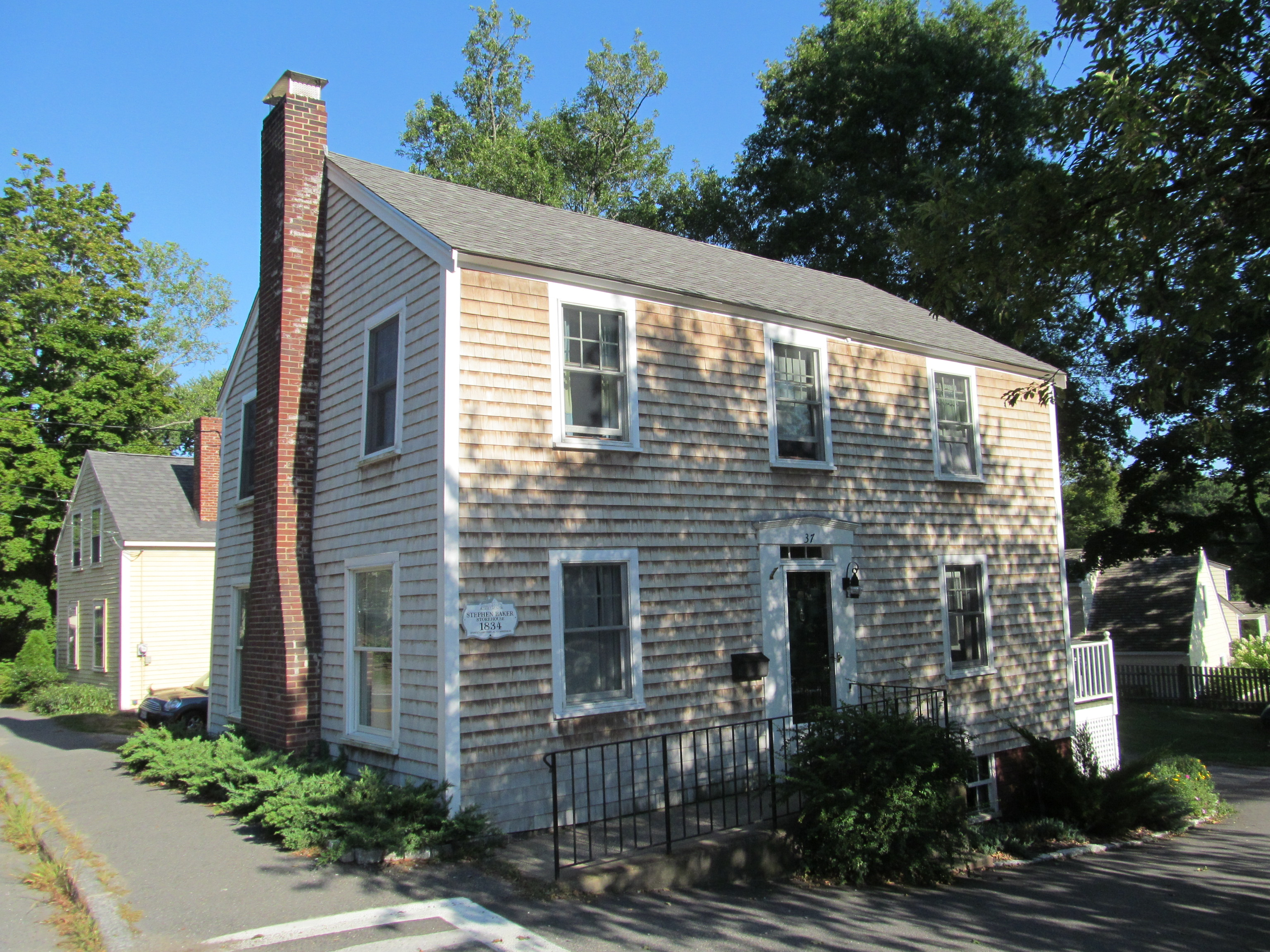
- Stephen Baker Storehouse

- Location within Massachusetts Location within the United States
- Location: Ipswich, Massachusetts
- Coordinates: 42°40′57″N 70°49′54″W
- Architect: Multiple
- Architectural style: Greek Revival, Second Empire, Italianate
- MPS: Central Village, Ipswich, Massachusetts MRA
- NRHP reference No.: 80000461
- Added to NRHP: September 17, 1980

The East End Historic District encompasses the historic eastern portion of central Ipswich, Massachusetts. The now predominantly residential district is bounded on the north and west by East Street, running from its junction with North Main and High Streets to Jeffrey's Neck Road. The eastern boundary includes the Ipswich River and Turkey Shore Road from its junction with Labor-in-Vain Road to Green Street, and the southern boundary runs along Green Street to North Main. The district was listed on the National Register of Historic Places in 1980.

Historically, the district encompasses the part of Ipswich that served as its access to the sea. The very earliest structures in the new settlement were built in the area near what is now Town Wharf, and development radiated from that point. In the early years, this was a center of economic activity, with lumber and fishing interests shipping their products out. A shipbuilding industry was active in the area, and there were workshops for a diversity of trades, including pottery and tanning.

By the 19th century these early industries were in decline, and industrial activity in other parts of the town took over in importance, so the area began to develop a more residential character. The early First Period, Georgian, and Federalist houses began to be joined by 19th century housing featuring Greek Revival, Second Empire, and Italianate architecture. The Green Street bridge tied the area to the South Green area, leading to some further development along Turkey Shore Road, south of the Ipswich River. The district has more than sixty houses representing these periods of development.

== See also ==
- National Register of Historic Places listings in Ipswich, Massachusetts
- National Register of Historic Places listings in Essex County, Massachusetts
