= Wade House (Ipswich, Massachusetts) =

Historic house in Massachusetts, United States

- U.S. National Register of Historic Places
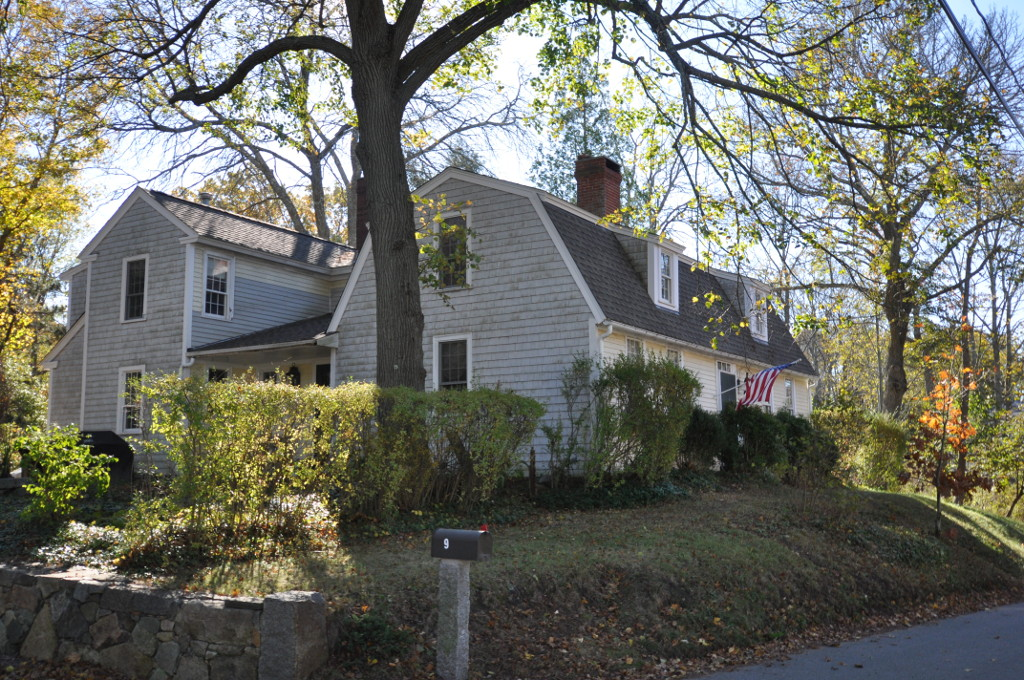

- Location within Massachusetts Location within the United States
- Location: 9 Woods Ln., Ipswich, Massachusetts
- Coordinates: 42°40′36.8″N 70°49′53″W
- Built: 1792
- Architectural style: Federal
- MPS: Central Village, Ipswich, Massachusetts MRA
- NRHP reference No.: 80000467
- Added to NRHP: September 17, 1980

The Wade House is a historic house in Ipswich, Massachusetts. The 1 1/2-story gambrel-roofed central chimney house was built in 1792 by Francis Merrifield, Jr. It was acquired in 1827 by Mary Wade, daughter of local Revolutionary War soldier Nathaniel Wade. It has been in the Wade family since then. The house originally had two rooms downstairs and two upstairs; the rear of the house was added in two stages. A number of period details survive, including the central staircase and paneled doors. Fragments of period wallpaper have also been preserved, and reproduction wallpaper has been used in one of the downstairs rooms.

The house was added to the National Register of Historic Places in 1980.

== See also ==
- National Register of Historic Places listings in Ipswich, Massachusetts
- National Register of Historic Places listings in Essex County, Massachusetts
