= Turner Hill =

Historic house in Massachusetts, United States

- U.S. National Register of Historic Places
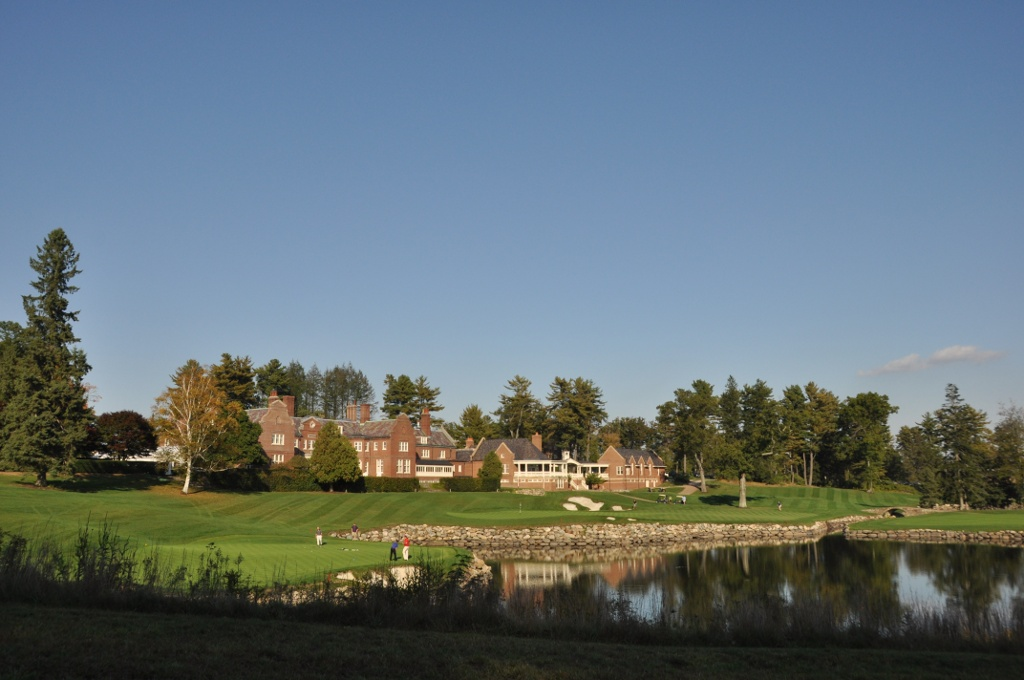

- Location within Massachusetts Location within the United States
- Location: Ipswich, Massachusetts
- Coordinates: 42°39′48″N 70°52′59″W
- Built: 1900
- Architect: Rantoul, William G.
- Architectural style: Tudor Revival
- NRHP reference No.: 82000483
- Added to NRHP: November 26, 1982

Turner Hill is a historic estate located at 315 Topsfield Road in Ipswich, Massachusetts. It was built for Charles Goodnough Rice and Ann Proctor Rice to a design by Boston architect William Rantoul. Begun in 1898 and completed in 1903, the estate echoed European country estates the couple had seen in their travels. The estate house features extensive plaster molding and detailed woodwork, notably in the reception hall, whose wildlife motifs echo those of Haddonfield Hall in Scotland. Rice died in 1943, and the estate was sold to the Missionaries of La Salette, who established a spiritual retreat on the site. It has since been converted into a golf club, with the main mansion house providing club facilities. In addition to a golf course, the grounds also have a large condominium complex.

The estate was listed on the National Register of Historic Places in 1982.

== See also ==
- National Register of Historic Places listings in Ipswich, Massachusetts
- National Register of Historic Places listings in Essex County, Massachusetts
