= Smith House (Ipswich, Massachusetts) =

Historic house in Massachusetts, United States

- U.S. National Register of Historic Places
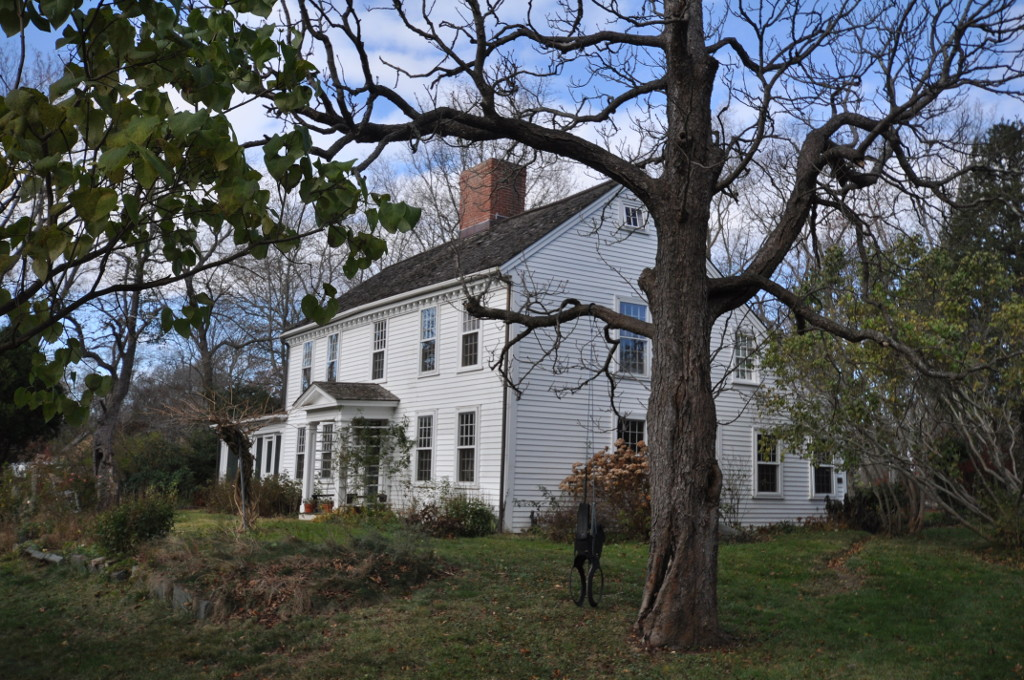

- Location within Massachusetts Location within the United States
- Location: 168 Argilla Rd., Ipswich, Massachusetts
- Coordinates: 42°40′14.7″N 70°47′49″W
- Built: 1720
- Architectural style: Colonial
- MPS: First Period Buildings of Eastern Massachusetts TR
- NRHP reference No.: 90000238
- Added to NRHP: March 9, 1990

The Smith House, also known locally as the Tilton-Smith House, is a historic house in Ipswich, Massachusetts. Built in the first quarter of the 18th century, it is a good example of late First Period architecture. It suffered serious fire damage in 1998, but underwent a meticulous restoration. It was listed on the National Register of Historic Places in 1990.

== Description and history ==
The Smith House stands in a rural-residential area of eastern Ipswich, on the north side of Argilla Road, roughly midway between Northgate Road and Fox Creek Road. It is oriented facing nearly south (the road runs east-northeast), and is screened from the road by mature plantings. It is a 2 1/2-story colonial style house with five window bays and a center chimney. It features an integral leanto section at its rear (rather than being a later addition). A number of the critical framing members of its construction are still exposed, showing workmanship that is typical of the First Period, but there are also typical Georgian period features, such as a plastered ceiling and wood paneling, and the stairway to the second floor is Georgian in character. The main entrance is sheltered by a small gabled Greek Revival porch.

The exact date of construction is not known with certainty. Architectural analysis places its construction toward the later end of the First Period of colonial construction, which ended around 1725. Other evidence suggests it may have been built about 1720 by Abraham Tilton, Jr. The house was extensively damaged by fire in 1998, and underwent a meticulous restoration by its owners, using period building techniques and salvage materials from 18th and 19th-century buildings. The building is the subject of a preservation easement held by the Ipswich Historic Commission.

== See also ==
- National Register of Historic Places listings in Ipswich, Massachusetts
- National Register of Historic Places listings in Essex County, Massachusetts
