= John Whipple House =

Historic house in Massachusetts, United States

- U.S. National Register of Historic Places
- U.S. National Historic Landmark
- U.S. Historic district – Contributing property
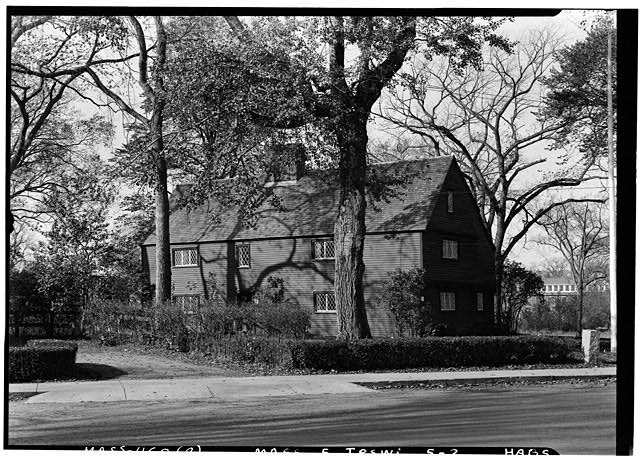
- John Whipple House; Ipswich, Massachusetts

- Location within Massachusetts Location within the United States
- Location: 1 South Green, Ipswich, Massachusetts
- Coordinates: 42°40′34″N 70°50′11″W
- Built: 1677
- Architect: Whipple, John
- Architectural style: Salt Box
- Part of: South Green Historic District (ID80000471)
- NRHP reference No.: 66000791

Significant dates
- Added to NRHP: October 15, 1966
- Designated NHL: October 9, 1960
- Designated CP: September 17, 1980

The John Whipple House is a historic colonial house at 1 South Green in Ipswich, Massachusetts. Built in the seventeenth century, the house has been open to the public as a museum since 1899 and was the subject of some of the earliest attempts at the preservation of colonial houses. It was designated a National Historic Landmark in 1960, one of the earliest properties to receive that honor.

== History ==
Construction of the three-story wood-frame First Period house was begun by Captain John Whipple in 1677 at the corner of Saltonstall and Market Streets. This initial construction consisted of a half-house timber frame with a chimney on the right side. In 1690, his son Major John Whipple added a second half-house to the right of the entryway. By 1705, a series of 3-sided 1-story timber frame additions (lean-tos) had been added on the west side of the house, including a kitchen (the third chimney), a buttery, and sleeping quarters for the household slaves and servants. Circa 1710, the west roof of the primary house was raised and extended over the lean-tos creating 4 additional slope-ceiling rooms. The total room count was then 14, not including the fully usable 3rd-floor attic above the primary structure. This was a very large house then (and now), with high ceilings in all rooms except the lean-tos, a prominent location near the mills and with land abutting the Ipswich River. It became known as "The Mansion", a title it retained for more than a century.

In the 1720s, a daughter who had inherited the house from Major John Whipple altered the facade and some of the interior to reflect the new and fashionable Georgian-style architecture. This required the removal of gables from the east facade and the replacement of diamond-paned leaded-glass casement windows with the new-style sash windows. The main entry timbered door was replaced with a paneled door with a window above.

The interior rooms received plastered ceilings and walls, and discreet camouflaging of the exposed timber frame members. The house and room configuration remained in this state until 1898 when it was purchased by the Ipswich Historical Society. The property had fallen into decline, after serving for a few years as the Mill managers' home, then a boarding house for mill workers and finally as a veritable tenement.

The Historical Society restored some of the interior to the assumed 17th-century style and replaced the Georgian windows and exterior doors with reproductions of the 17th-century originals. It was opened to the public as a House Museum in 1899. In 1927, it was moved to its current location, on the opposite side of the river, surrounded by 10 acres (4.0 ha) of woods, field, and garden. The house is sited on the same compass points as it was originally.

When extensive termite damage was found in the east façade in the 1950s, the house was closed and extensive restoration was begun. The exposed interior skeleton of this facade revealed the prior existence of 2 gables, which were then included in the restoration project. All new casement windows with hand-blown glass set in hand-leaded frames were installed and the house was re-opened to the public. It was declared a National Historic Landmark in 1960, the first year such designations were made, and added to the National Register of Historic Places in 1966. In 2002 the house was definitively dated to 1677 using dendrochronology.

The house features oak, tamarack, pine and chestnut framework, and original plasterwork. Some remaining sash windows in lean-to rooms date to the 1690s. The Ipswich Historical Society is now the Ipswich Museum and offers house tours for the public from late May to late October, Thursdays – Sundays.

== Gallery ==
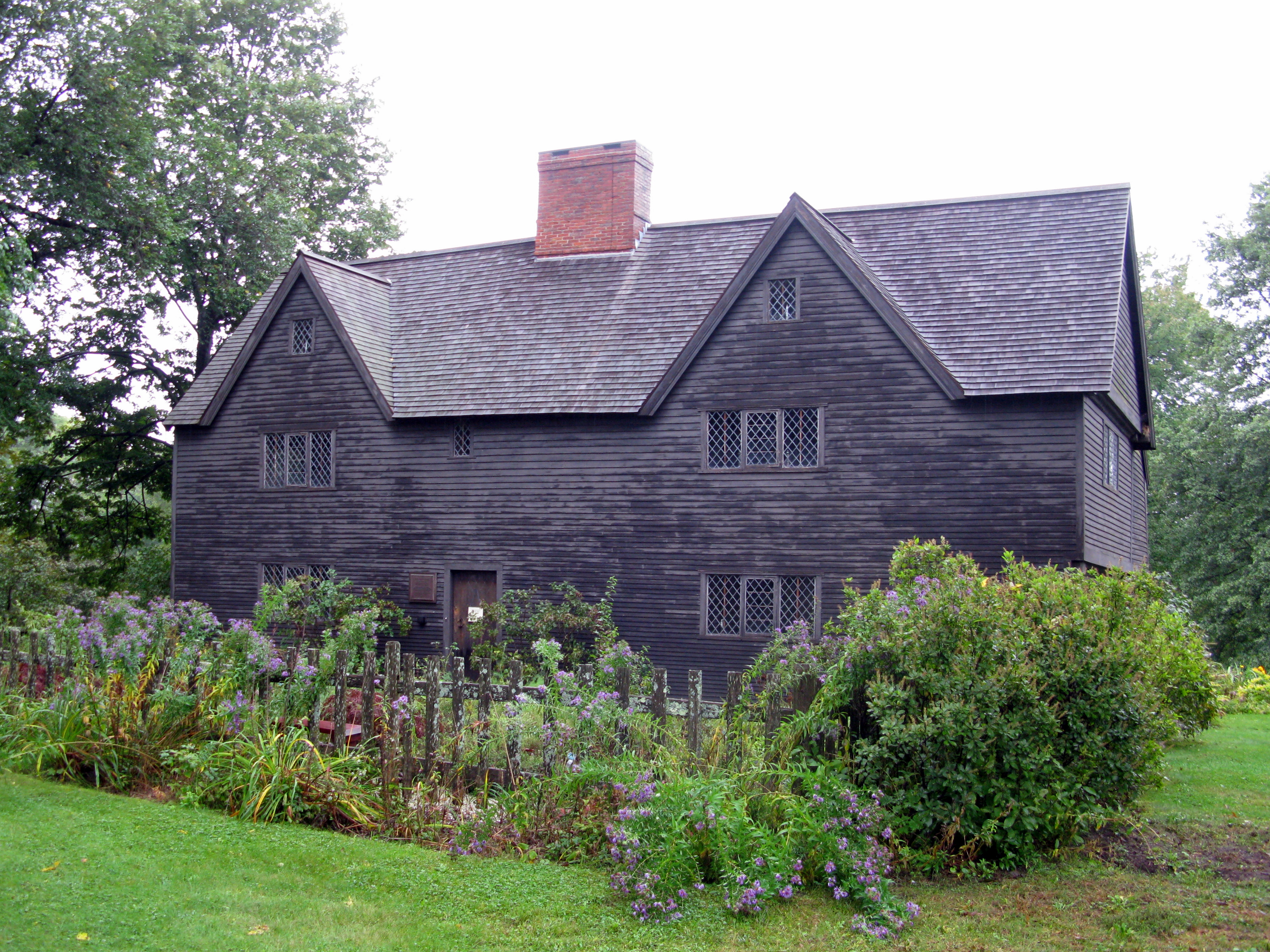
Front

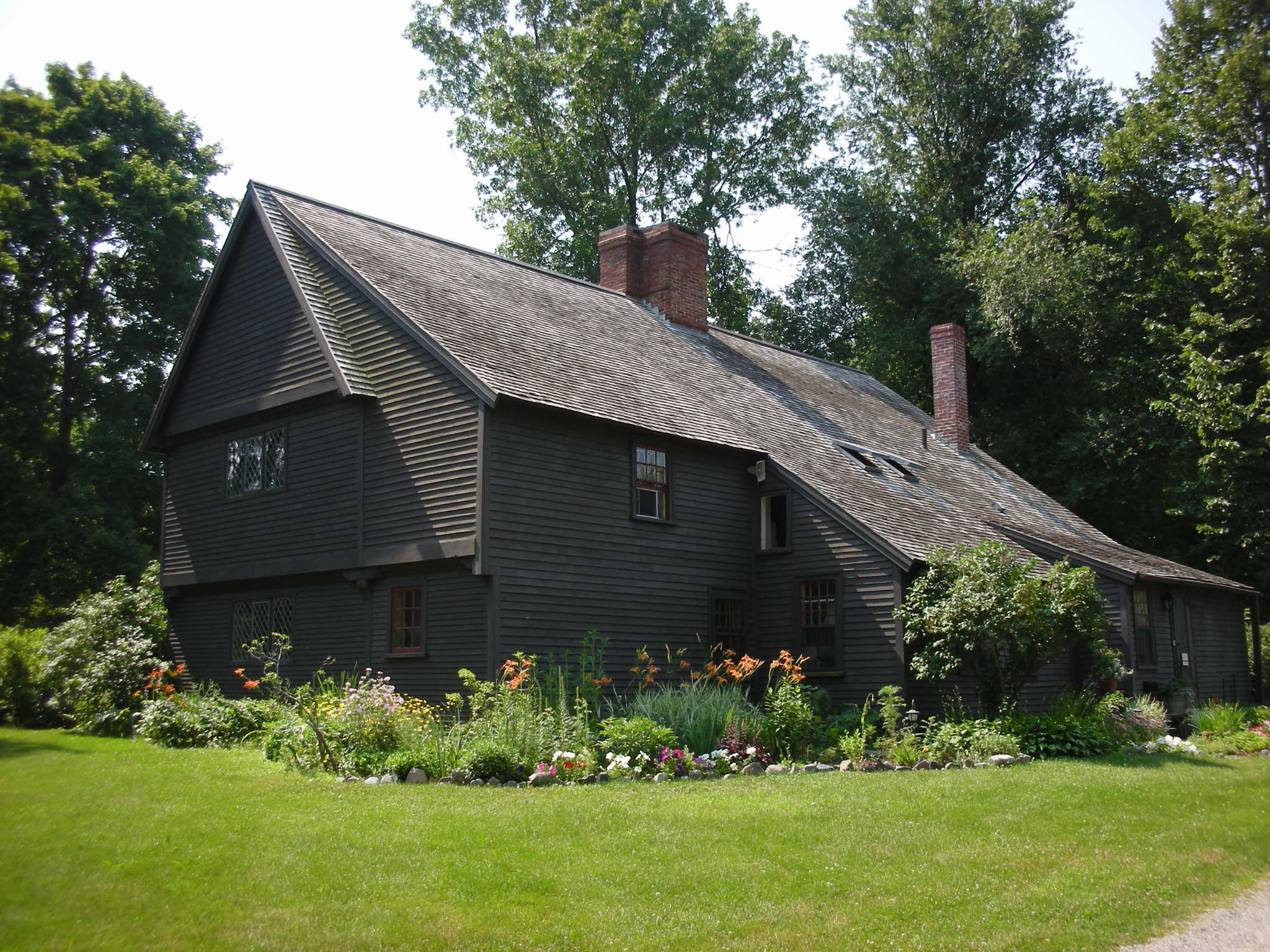
Back

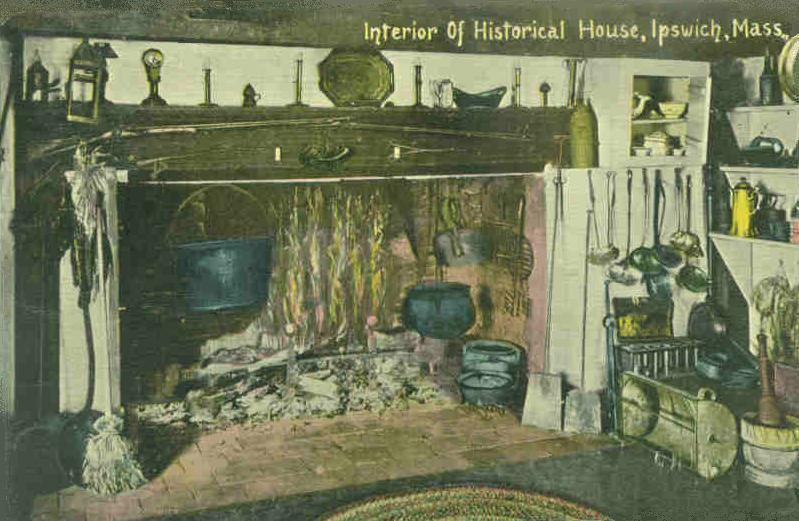
Kitchen

== See also ==
- List of the oldest buildings in Massachusetts
- National Register of Historic Places listings in Ipswich, Massachusetts
- National Register of Historic Places listings in Essex County, Massachusetts
- List of National Historic Landmarks in Massachusetts
