= High Street Historic District (Ipswich, Massachusetts) =

Historic district in Massachusetts, United States

- U.S. National Register of Historic Places
- U.S. Historic district
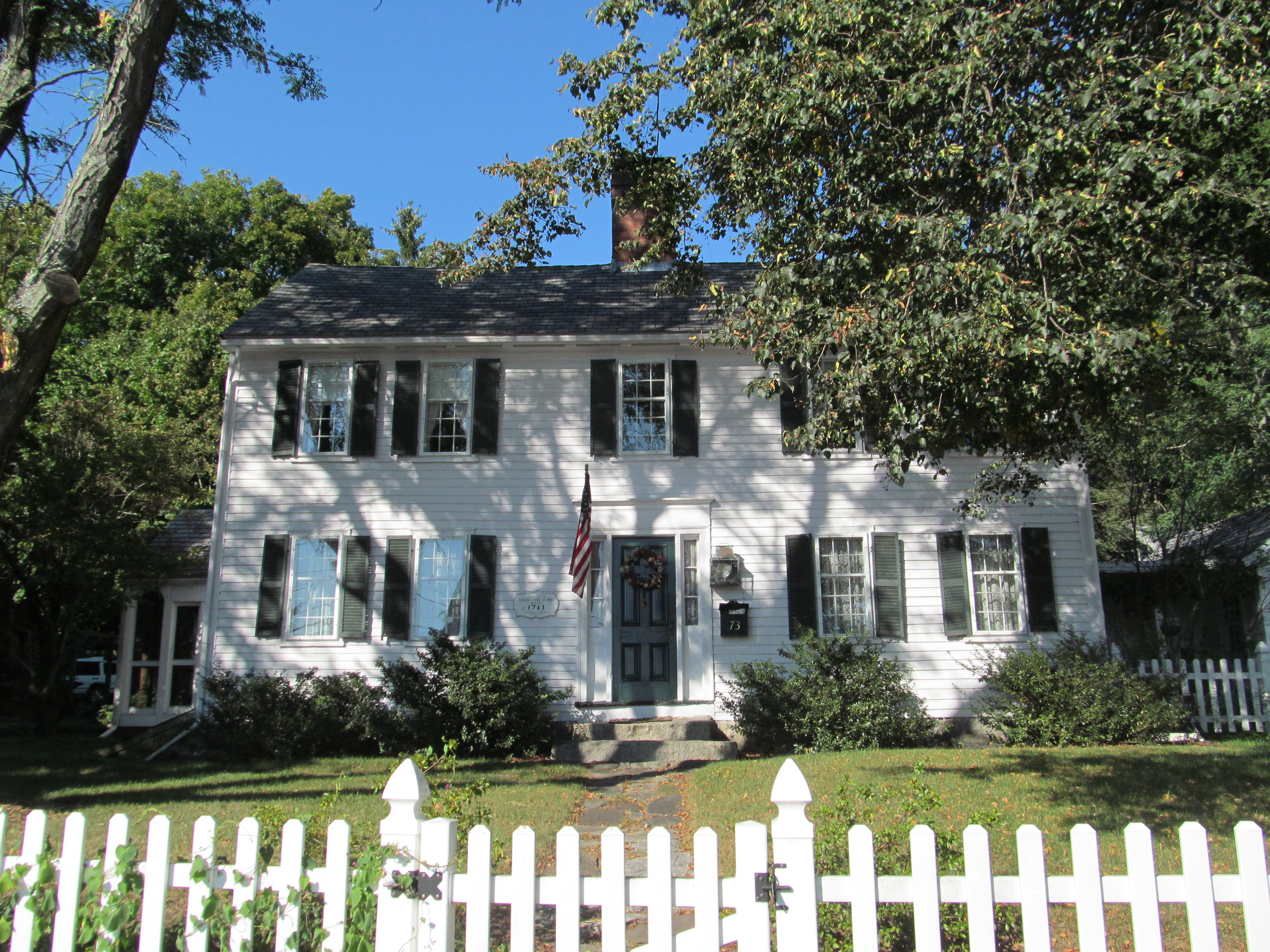
- Nathaniel Lord House

- Location within Massachusetts Location within the United States
- Location: Ipswich, Massachusetts
- Coordinates: 42°41′7″N 70°50′28″W
- Architect: Multiple
- Architectural style: Colonial, Federal
- MPS: Central Village, Ipswich, Massachusetts MRA
- NRHP reference No.: 80000454
- Added to NRHP: September 17, 1980

The High Street Historic District is a predominantly residential historic district in Ipswich, Massachusetts. It encompasses the oldest section of High Street, which was laid out when Ipswich was founded in 1633. The district runs for four blocks from the junction with Town Farm Road and the railroad right-of-way in the west, to North Main Street in the east. The street was for several centuries part of the principal thoroughfare through the town, but became sidelined by the construction of Central Street in 1871, which bypassed traffic off most of this stretch of High Street.

Ipswich was from its earliest days an important transit stop, and High Street was the location of its inns for travelers. It was also where courts met when judges rode the circuit. In the 18th century small industrial shops also populated the street, and some of these led to the building of larger textile firms elsewhere. When Central Street was built just south of High Street, the street began to acquire a more distinctly residential character, which it retains to this day.

The district contains more than thirty structures built before 1750, many of which retain First Period and Georgian styling. Some of the more interesting houses include that of John Caldwell, built c. 1660 on the site of Governor Simon Bradstreet's original 1630s house, the c. 1770s town jail, which was converted into a Greek Revival house in the 19th century, and the c. 1727 house of Reverend Nathaniel Rogers. One of the more unusual later buildings included on the district is a Stick Victorian at 12 High Street.

The district was listed on the National Register of Historic Places in 1980.

== See also ==
- National Register of Historic Places listings in Ipswich, Massachusetts
- National Register of Historic Places listings in Essex County, Massachusetts
