= Choate Bridge =

- U.S. National Register of Historic Places
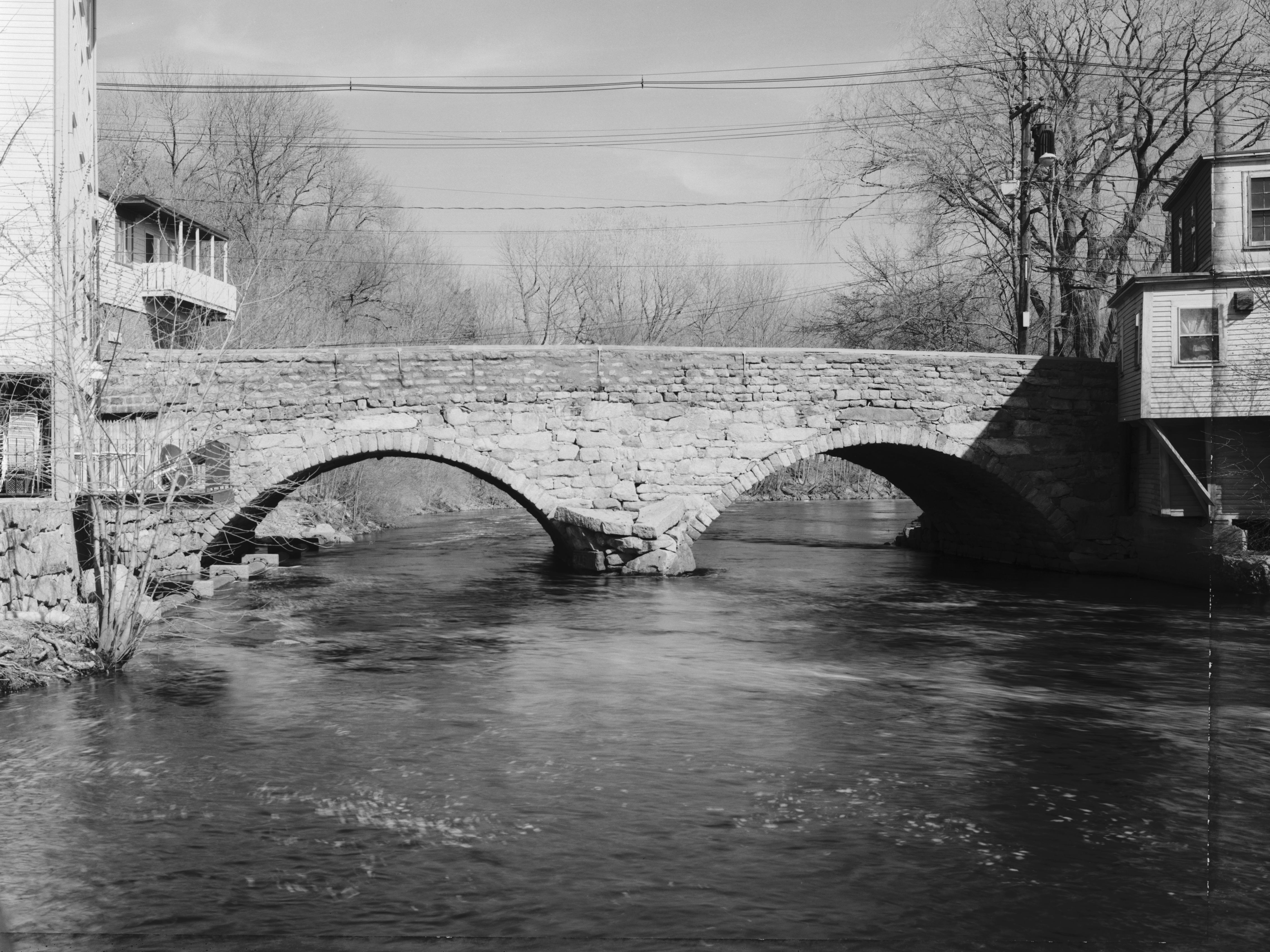
- Choate Bridge, Spanning Ipswich River at South Main Street, Ipswich

- Location within Massachusetts Location within the United States
- Location: Ipswich, Massachusetts
- Coordinates: 42.67947°N 70.8371°W
- Built: 1764
- Architect: Col. John Choate
- NRHP reference No.: 72000137
- Added to NRHP: August 21, 1972

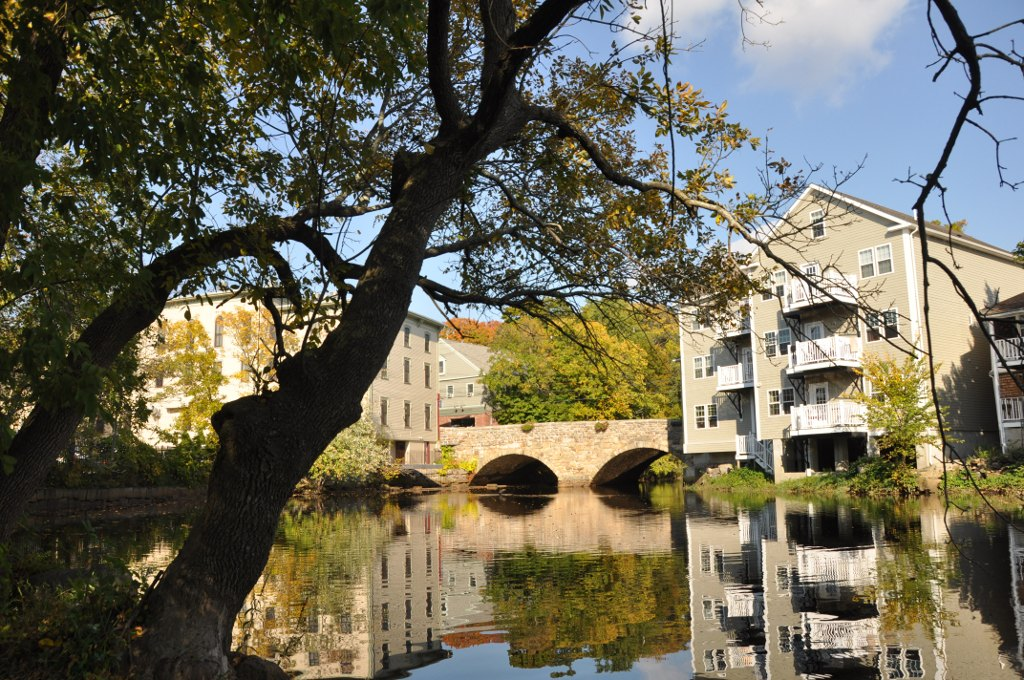
The bridge in 2012

Choate Bridge (1764) is a historic stone arch bridge carrying Route 1A/Route 133 (South Main Street) over the Ipswich River in Ipswich, Massachusetts. It is one of the oldest surviving bridges in North America, and is probably the oldest in Massachusetts. It was listed on the National Register of Historic Places in 1972 and also has been designated as a National Historic Civil Engineering Landmark.

== History ==
The stone bridge was built in 1764 with funds provided by the town of Ipswich and Essex County. Construction was supervised by Colonel John Choate, in whose honor the bridge was named. Choate was allegedly the first person to ride his horse over the bridge. In 1838 the single lane bridge was widened to two lanes by adding to the eastern side of the structure. In 1989 the bridge was extensively renovated.

There are two known bridges of greater age still in use in the United States: the Pennypack Creek Bridge in Philadelphia, a double arch stone bridge built in 1697, and a single arch stone bridge in nearby Rowley, Massachusetts, built in 1643 and rebuilt in the 19th century.

== Description ==
The bridge has a total length of 72 feet (22 m), with two stone arches, each spanning 30 feet 6 inches (9.30 m). It is constructed out of roughly dressed granite; the original 1764 arches are 20 feet (6.1 m) wide, with the 1838 addition adding 16 feet (4.9 m). The arch facing of the older portion is finished with lime and mortar, while the newer is dry laid. The older western spandrel wall is fashioned out of heavily chinked rubble, while that on the eastern side is fashioned out of larger blocks that are drill-split rubble. The bridge has low parapets on either side; that on the west is presumed to be original to the bridge's 1764 construction. All of the stone elements have seen numerous repairs and evidence of repointing prior to the 1989 rehabilitation. The central pier has an extended nose on the upstream side of unknown age.

== See also ==
- List of bridges documented by the Historic American Engineering Record in Massachusetts
- List of bridges on the National Register of Historic Places in Massachusetts
- National Register of Historic Places listings in Ipswich, Massachusetts
- National Register of Historic Places listings in Essex County, Massachusetts
