= South Green Historic District (Ipswich, Massachusetts) =

Historic district in Massachusetts, United States

- U.S. National Register of Historic Places
- U.S. Historic district
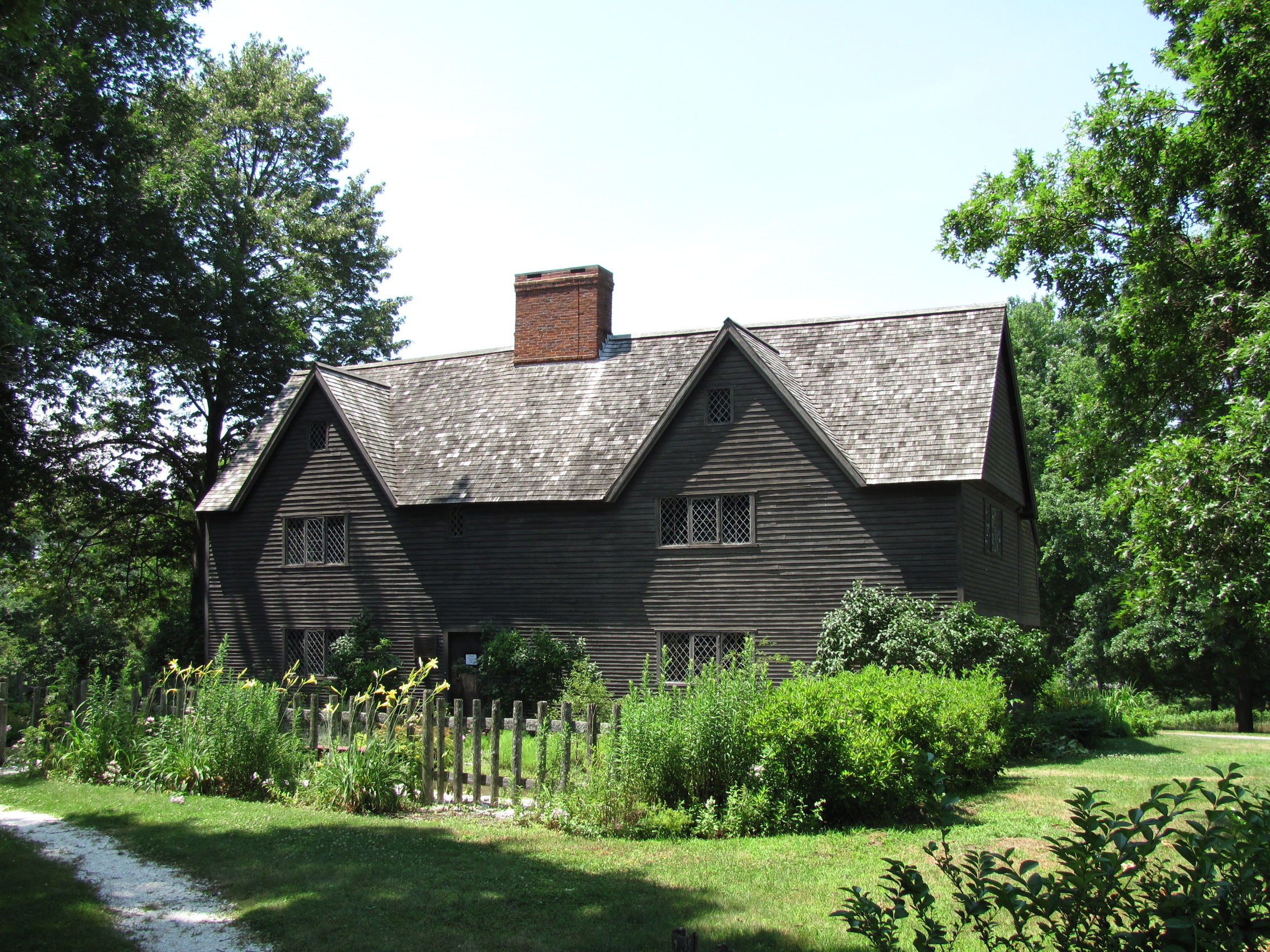
- John Whipple House, ca. 1670s

- Location within Massachusetts Location within the United States
- Location: Ipswich, Massachusetts
- Coordinates: 42°40′32″N 70°50′13″W
- Architect: Multiple
- Architectural style: Second Empire
- MPS: Central Village, Ipswich, Massachusetts MRA
- NRHP reference No.: 80000471
- Added to NRHP: September 17, 1980

The South Green Historic District encompasses one of the oldest central civic parts of Ipswich, Massachusetts. The town's South Green was laid out in 1686, and is now the heart of a collection of historic properties dating from the 17th to the 19th century. The centerpiece of the district is the green itself, and its most notable associated property is the John Whipple House, a National Historic Landmark and museum. The district boundaries extend from the junction of South Main and Elm Streets, southward past the green to where County Road (Massachusetts Route 1A) crosses Saltonstall's Creek.

Ipswich voted to establish the South Green in 1686, after which it was used as a common grazing area, and as a training ground for the local militia. It was also the site of Ipswich's earliest school buildings, which even predated the establishment of the green as a common area. The first schoolhouse was built in the area in 1652; it was moved to the Meetinghouse Green in 1704, at which time private education continued in the area. A public school was again introduced to the South Green area in 1794, which became the English High School from 1836 to 1874.

Most of the surviving structures in the district are houses. The oldest is the c. 1653 Whipple House, which was moved to the area in the 1930s. The green is flanked by buildings dating through the 19th century, in a variety of styles. The predominant styles are Georgian, Federal, and Greek Revival, although there are several later Victorian properties. The district was listed on the National Register of Historic Places in 1980.

== See also ==
- National Register of Historic Places listings in Ipswich, Massachusetts
- National Register of Historic Places listings in Essex County, Massachusetts
