= Goodhue =

Goodhue may refer to:

== Places in the United States ==
- Goodhue County, Minnesota
  - Goodhue, Minnesota
  - Goodhue Township, Goodhue County, Minnesota

== People ==
- Benjamin Goodhue (1748–1814), U.S. representative and senator from Massachusetts
- Bertram Goodhue (1869–1924), American architect
- Cameron Goodhue (born 1987), New Zealand rugby union footballer, brother of Jack and Josh Goodhue
- Charles Frederick Henry Goodhue (c. 1785–c. 1840), entrepreneur and politician in Lower Canada, brother of George Goodhue
- Charles Quincy Goodhue (1835–1910), American illustrator
- Dale L. Goodhue (born c. 1944), American organizational theorist and computer scientist
- F. Abott Goodhue (1883–1963), American banker
- Frederick Goodhue (1867–1940), Scottish rugby union footballer
- George Jervis Goodhue (1799–1870), Canadian merchant, landowner and politician
- Harry Wright Goodhue (1905–1931), American stained glass artist
- Jack Goodhue (born 1995), New Zealand rugby union footballer
- James M. Goodhue (1810–1852), American journalist, newspaper editor and newspaper founder, namesake of the county
- Josh Goodhue (born 1995), New Zealand rugby union footballer
- Lyle Goodhue (1903–1981), American inventor and scientist
- Mary B. Goodhue (1921–2004), American politician and lawyer
- Nellie A. Goodhue (1869–1957), American pioneer in the education of handicapped and exceptional children
- Ralph B. Goodhue (1878-1960), American farmer and politician
- Sarah Whipple Goodhue (1641–1681), American Puritan writer
- Goodhue Livingston (1867–1951), American architect and co-founder of Trowbridge & Livingston, an architectural firm in New York City

== Other uses ==
- USS Goodhue, a World War II attack transport
- Goodhue Building, an office building in downtown Beaumont, Texas, United States
- Goodhue Lutheran Church, Florence, South Dakota, United States, on the National Register of Historic Places
