= Charles Goodhue =

Charles Goodhue is the name of:

- Charles Frederick Henry Goodhue (c. 1785–c. 1840), entrepreneur and politician in Lower Canada
- Charles Quincy Goodhue (1835–1910), American illustrator
