= Eric Standley =

American painter

Eric Standley (born 1968 in Ipswich, Massachusetts) is an American contemporary artist known for his extremely complex, multi-layered cut paper compositions. He received his BFA in Painting and Interrelated Media from the Massachusetts College of Art and an MFA in Painting at the Savanna College of Art and Design. Dr. Panagiotis Kambanis, the archaeologist of Byzantine and post-Byzantine antiquities at the Museum of Byzantine Culture wrote in his forward of the 2014 CUT Catalogue, "It is not the quality of the raw material that makes art, but the art that gives quality to the raw material. The works of Eric Standley consist of successive layers of intricately cut paper sheets, which with the help of lasers create a multifaceted, rich, and colorful ensemble. The result is so complex and detailed that [it] should be examined from multiple viewpoints in order for it to be fully appreciated". Standley is an associate professor of studio art for the School of Visual Arts at Virginia Tech. He lives and works in Blacksburg, Virginia, US.
