= Fort Philip =

- Plum Island, Newburyport, Massachusetts

Site information
- Type: Coastal defense
- Condition: no remains, beach eroded

Location
- Location in Massachusetts Fort Philip (the United States)
- Coordinates: 42°48′55″N 70°49′5″W

Site history
- Built: 1776, 1808
- In use: 1776–1781, 1808–1815
- Materials: wood, earthworks
- Demolished: circa 1830
- Battles/wars: American Revolutionary War; War of 1812

Fort Philip (also spelled Fort Phillips) was a fort built in 1776 during the American Revolutionary War and rebuilt in 1808, which also served in the War of 1812 to around 1815. It was in Newburyport, Massachusetts on the northern end of Plum Island, known as Lighthouse Point, guarding the mouth of the Merrimack River. The 1808 rebuilding was part of the second system of US fortifications. The secretary of war's report on fortifications in December 1808 states that "...a battery of wood, filled in with sand and surmounted with sod, has been erected. It... was constructed of wood on account of the shifting sands." A subsequent report in December 1811 describes the fort as "...an enclosed battery, built of earth and timber, mounting five heavy guns... ." The site eventually washed away in the 1830s. A militia artillery battery was stationed in the area in the Spanish–American War.

== See also ==
- List of military installations in Massachusetts
