= Sandy Point State Reservation =

State reserve in Massachusetts

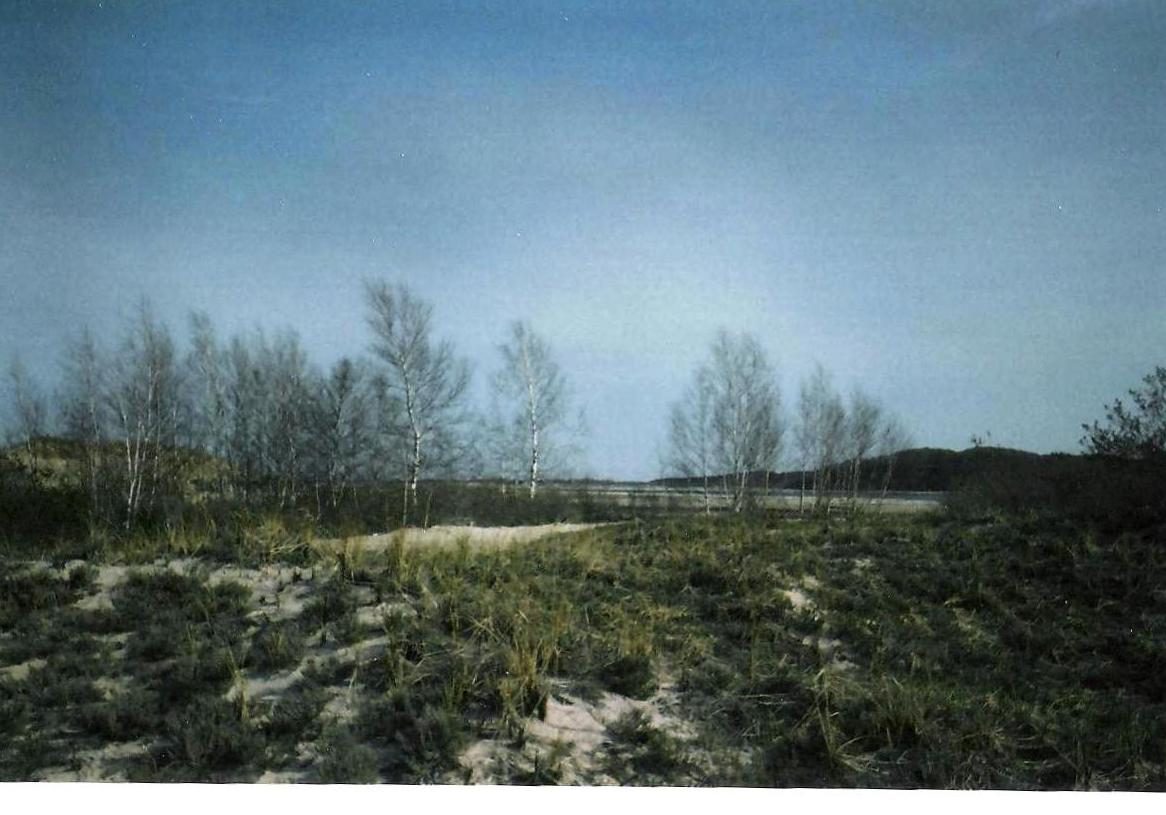
- View south from Sandy Point. Castle Hill, Ipswich, is visible across the bay. The trees are white birch.

- Location within Massachusetts Location within the United States
- Location: Ipswich, Massachusetts, United States
- Coordinates: 42°42′10″N 70°46′35″W
- Area: 134 acres (54 ha)
- Named for: The extensive sand bank projecting into Ipswich Bay that appears at low tide and is a hazard when covered at high tide.
- Administrator: Massachusetts Department of Conservation and Recreation
- Website: Official website

Sandy Point State Reservation is a coastal Massachusetts state park located in the town of Ipswich at the southern tip of Plum Island. The reservation is managed by the Department of Conservation and Recreation and is an important nesting area for the piping plover and the least tern. Access to the reservation is through the adjoining Parker River National Wildlife Refuge.

== Geography ==
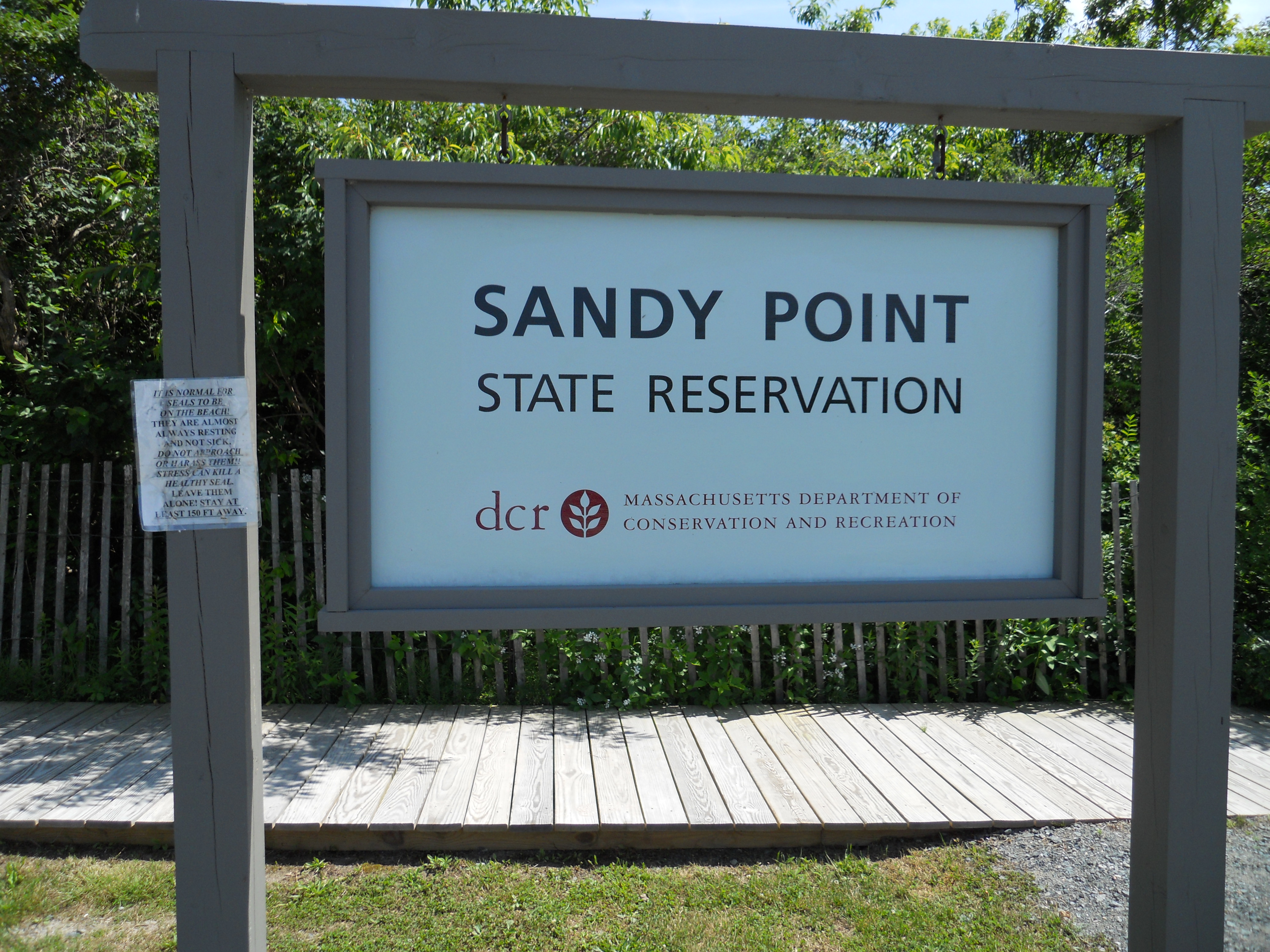
Entrance sign in the parking lot beneath Bar Head.

Sandy Point State Reservation is on a large spit of sand at the southern end of Plum Island: "Sandy Point". Plum Island Drive, a dirt road on the southern half of Plum Island, ends at the foot of a hill of glacial origin, Bar Head. Rocks: "Bar Head Rocks", extend from a 19th-century gravel pit in the side of the hill into the water. Some of them have been formed into a rudimentary breakwater at the high water line. At present harbor seals have been observed basking in these rocks and in Emerson Rocks slightly further north in the Parker River National Wildlife Refuge. They are rare; visitors cannot count on seeing one. They are advised by sign not to approach a seal if one is present. The presence of the seals has also brought their main predators back to the waters off Plum Island: sharks. Although shark attacks are extremely rare as yet, sightings are not. Among them is the great white shark. Swimmers either from the beach or from boats off the beach are advised to consider the dangers.

On the north side of Bar Head is Stage Island Pool, a fresh-water pond created on the vestiges of a 19th-century salt works. It is named after Stage Island, the esker that forms its northern border. The drying vats stood where the pool now stands; gravel was mined from the hill to place a circular protective access road around what is now the pool area. Within it was a canal and within that the vats. A dike was placed across the mouth of what was then Bar Island Creek (now non-existent) dividing it from Stage Island Creek and creating an impoundment in the canals, kept full by several pump-up windmills and a treadmill. Water was periodically channeled from the canal to the drying vats. The salt works was not profitable and did not last long. The dike was kept, behind which fresh-water runoff drowned the vats and the canal, creating a convenient refuge for birds.

The Parker River National Wildlife Refuge extends to the foot of Bar Hill on the southern side of Stage Island Pool; that is, the pool is not in the state park. Stage Island is part of the refuge. The trail on state land along the southern half of the pool, which follows the old salt-works road, is continued in the refuge on the northern side. The road on the east side of the pond also is not state land. The dunes in this area have been stabilized with stands of black pine. Visitors are restricted from the dunes and in summer the beach on the federal reservation. A large variety of rarely seen birds may feed and rest in and around the pool. An observation tower on federal land, open in the summer, is of use in viewing the birds.

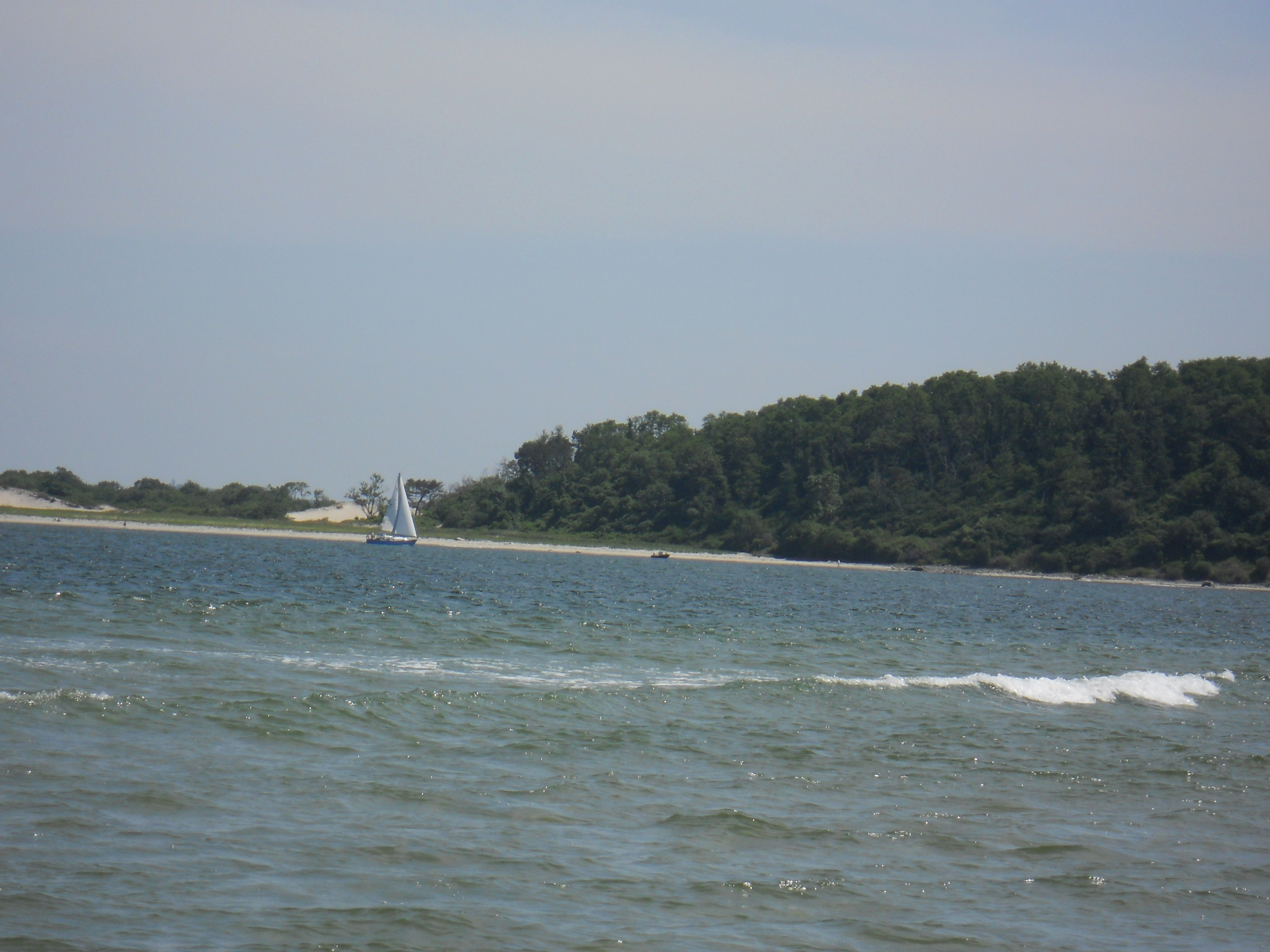
Sailboat beating upwind into the channel in Ipswich Bay. Castle Hill and Crane's Beach are visible in the background. The tide is high. A breaker on Sandy Point is visible in the foreground.

The state park contains mainly the hill and the sand spit, a maritime feature. The Atlantic Local Coastal Pilot of 1879 gives detailed instructions for sailing into the Ipswich River and Plum Island Sound from the Atlantic. It advises the captain of a sailing vessel to heave to and send for a pilot, as "The bar at the entrance to Ipswich Harbor is of shifting sand and changes its position with every heavy gale ...." The channel went, and still goes, between two bars, North Breaker, extending from Sandy Point, and South Breaker, extending from the vicinity of Castle Hill. In 1879 they were marked by buoys and lights. Currently North Breaker is marked by a spar buoy and South Breaker by a can buoy, in addition to the channel buoys. At low tide North Breaker is nearly entirely exposed.

The reference points out the difficulty in 1879 of anchoring either off the mouth of the channel or in Plum Island Sound, as the currents may cause the vessel to drag anchor. Currently Ipswich Harbor is sprinkled with mooring buoys securely fastened to the bottom. At low tide water in the channel may be as deep as only 5 feet (1.5 m), which is true today. As at the northern end of Plum Island, tidal currents through the channel are unusually swift; moreover, the sands near the low tide mark are uncompacted and form quicksands. In the age of wooden sailing vessels, it was possible for small cargo vessels to sail up the Ipswich to unload their cargos closer to town. Today mainly motorized recreational vessels are seen in marinas along the river.

The reference estimated the height of Castle Hill — called that even then — at 125 feet (38 m). Bar Head was estimated to be 40–50 feet high and was bare of trees. Today the entire hill is covered with a dense and impassable thicket, a refuge for birds. A trail has been cut from the beach to a vegetation-choked wooden observation tower on the summit.

== Historical summary ==
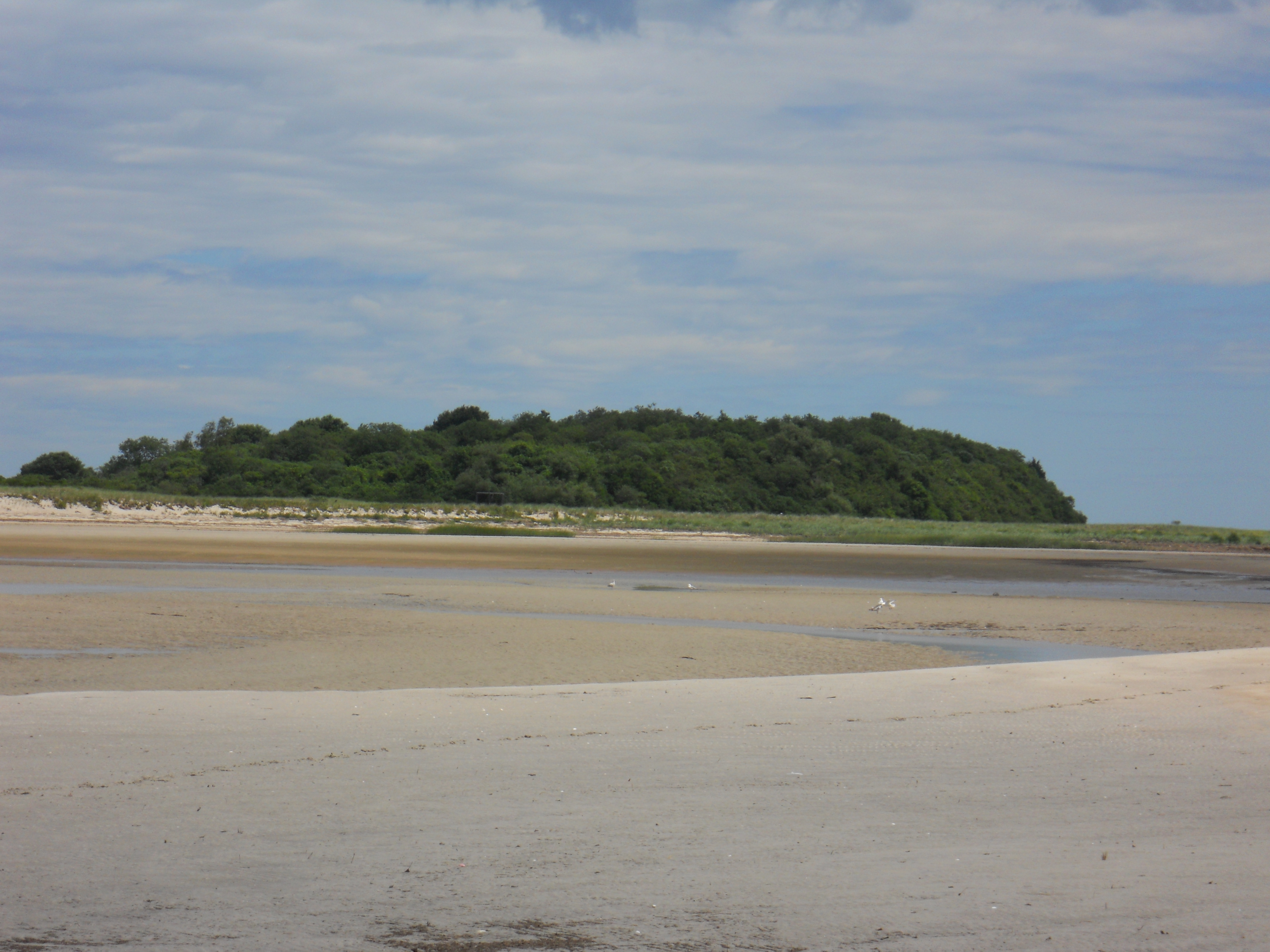
Bar Island seen from Sandy Point at low tide.

In the earliest documents concerning the Plum Island region (17th century) the major features are named with their current names. The coastal terrain of the North Shore of Massachusetts is mainly of glacial origin. Moraines and eskers in the wetlands are often called "islands" regardless of whether they are so. Bar Head received its original name of Bar Island from the bar extending from Sandy Point. Bar Head is currently preferred, but that name may also refer to only Bar Head Rocks or only to the cliff facing the sea. In the time of the salt works, a small village was placed there, Bar Island Village. In colonial times as now Bar Island was never an island, even at high tides.

Just to the north of Bar Island is Stage Island, also formerly called "the Bluffs", which is an esker. Early literature refers to it as an upland. These terms are relative to the point of view of a boat on the water, as Stage Island was never an island and the bluffs are only a gentle rise of 10–20 feet off the water, not a bluff or an upland in the usual montane sense of the word. The term stage comes from some sort of stage, unknown now, used for drying fish at that location. Also visible from Sandy Point are Grape Island and Middle Ground, or Middle Island, which are islands in Plum Island Sound, Castle Hill, Little Neck and Jeffrey's or Great Neck. The latter three are divided from the mainland by the wetlands of the Ipswich River and the Essex River. The south end of Plum Island can only be accessed (except along Plum Island Drive) by boat from hills and necks that are far from town and difficult to access themselves.

=== From commons to estate ===
From 1634 to 1649 use of the southern portion of Plum Island was ungoverned. Individuals pastured farm animals there in the summer, mainly hogs. In 1649 the General Court of Massachusetts apportioned the southern 2/5 of Plum Island to Ipswich, Massachusetts. It was at first managed by appointees of the town as a commons. If the town harvested the grass it was distributed to those who had no grass; otherwise, individuals were allowed to harvest grass at will. Mutual interferences were punishable by fine.

By popular demand at town meetings the Ipswich portion of Plum Island, Hog Island and Castle Neck (on which was Castle Hill) were divided into lots, 1664–1665, which were distributed to the legal residents. On April 10, 1665, selectmen chosen by town meeting for the purpose found that there were 203 "reckoned and allowed inhabitants" and 800 acres (3.2 km^{2}) of commons. Allowing 2 shares (6 acres) for 28 persons, 1.5 shares (4.5 acres) for 70 persons and 1 share (3 acres) for the rest, they specified a method for laying out 266 shares starting from the Rowley border. The shares received by a person: 2, 1.5 or 1, depended on the person's assessed wealth. The lots were distributed by a system that combined chance and wealth such that "the fine upland lots fell in the main to the humbler folk."

In 1667 the town acted to restrict herd animals from the newly distributed commons, as "the value of the upland lots, particularly, was greatly impaired by the unrestrained wandering of the cattle and swine...." These and other measures were not effective. Animals originating in Newbury continued to devastate the island. In 1679 Ipswich petitioned the General Court again charging that the marshes were being "trodden to dirt" and the cover removed from the dunes was destabilizing the sand. The court acted to forbid animals from the island without proprietor permission, but as this measure was not effective either, in 1739 all animals were restricted from the island under penalty of impoundment and heavy fines if the animals were claimed, confiscation if they were not. The cutting of trees and bushes also was forbidden, with a fine for each plant cut. The act was continued until at least 1785.

The commons division of 1665 was no great windfall to the population of Ipswich. Many were not farmers and had no animals. The remote location prevented most from occupying and building on their land. Other crops could not be grown in the sandy and salty soil; only salt marsh hay was worth anything. The parcels were advertised as "fine upland farms", but they were neither farms nor upland. If a farmer did pasture his animals there in the summer, they had to compete for the grass with unrestrained herds from the north. The best course for the new owner was to sell if he could find a buyer. They were not long in arriving; entrepreneurs gradually bought up the land for their own purposes.

Middle Island was the richest farmland and was close to the Ipswich shore. The original recipients were John Brown and William Buckley. In 1693 John Pengry bought the island and in subsequent years the lots in the marsh and dunes opposite. He acquired Stage Island. He did not occupy the land himself, but chose to build a house and barn and lease the expanded farm to Amos Goodwin. In 1712-13 Pengry sold 20 acres (81,000 m^{2}) to Nathaniel Emerson, a fisherman who had been born in Ipswich but lived in Gloucester, thus starting the Emerson dynasty. The Emersons placed a fishing business there: a wharf, a warehouse, fish-drying stages, and kept two sloops in the creeks: the Sea Flower and the Hope. Emerson Rocks are named after the Emersons.

In 1732 Pengry sold another tract including Stage Island, which was resold and ended up in the hands of William Dodge, a "wealthy merchant." He kept a schooner, the Rebecca, and a fleet of smaller boats in Plum Island sound and owned a "negro man servant, Scipio." Although slaves could not be legally purchased in Massachusetts, they could be bought elsewhere and owned in Massachusetts, and were, extensively. In 1783 Dodge bought Bar Island, which had been tenanted by small landholders attempting to live there. The island was clear of vegetation and remained so until the 20th century. The Emersons reached a peak in the 1730s when the estate came into the hands of the brothers, Nathaniel and Broster. An alcoholic, Broster squandered the assets of the business, forcing it into bankruptcy. Nathaniel's son Stephen in 1740 sold to Ralph Cross, a shipbuilder from Newbury, the first of the Cross dynasty. He gradually bought all the Ipswich portion of Plum Island up to and over the Rowley line, except for Stage Island and Bar Island, which was sold as a single estate to various owners. The Cross holdings became known as Cross Farm, a name which they hold today. Stage Island and some of the marsh to the north were the last remnant of privately held land in the south of the island, but now they have been left to the Federal reservation. Although the hay was cut and sold for a profit, the holdings were never a subsistence farm as on the mainland. The now apparently rural sound was then a busy harbor where 3-masters anchored between shores lined with shipyards and the warehouses of merchants from the Parker River southward. By the 19th century the businesses were preempted by Newburyport Harbor, not accessible from the sound, and the region declined.

=== Hazards of Ipswich Bar ===
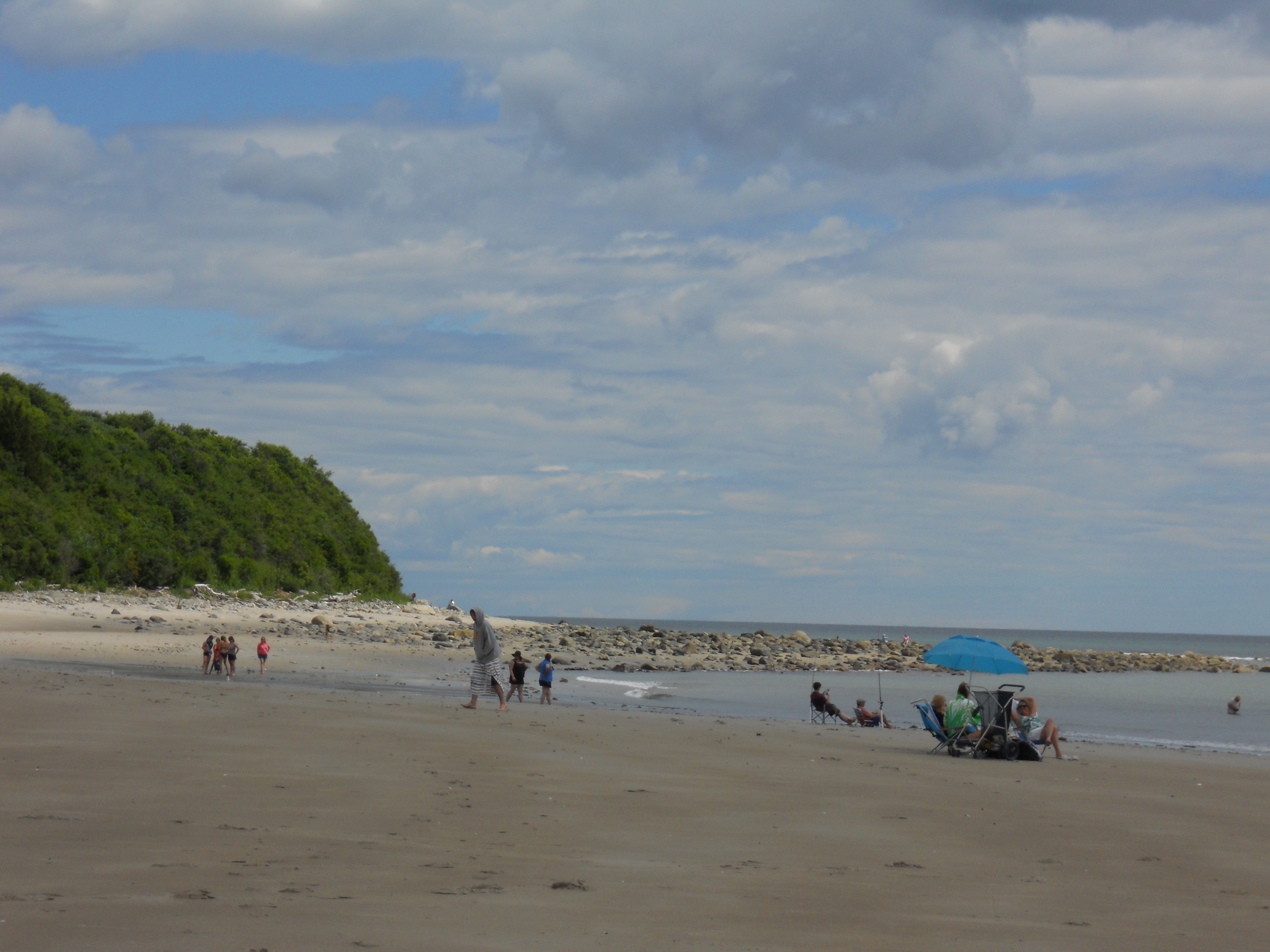
Bar Head Rocks, a prelude to disaster. Seen here at low tide, they are covered at high, waiting to take the bottom out of a vessel trying to clear Sandy Point.

Ipswich Bar, as Sandy Point has been called historically, has a long history of tragedy. The swift currents and shallow waters are dangerous at any time of year, but they are fatal most often in winter and in a storm. Sailing vessels were driven aground on the bar and although in full sight of land only 1/4 mile or less away the victims could not reach it except through the chilled waters and breaking surf, and if they did reach it, found themselves far from assistance. The main cause of death is hypothermia or drowning following on hypothermia, which ensues in only a few minutes in the winter waters of Massachusetts, chilled by the Labrador current. Records of the loss of small boats began in the 18th century. They went aground on the beach or bar in winter. The boat's complement attempting to reach shore died in the surf or on the beach. As those buried in the sand did not stay buried a cemetery was established for them on Bar Island.

Among the disasters of greater magnitude is the wreck of the Falconer, a 360-ton brig from Belfast captained by Joseph Rolerson, of the same city, whom the town records of Ipswich, Massachusetts, list as Captain Joseph Rawlinson. She was transporting 350 tons of coal from Cape Breton, Nova Scotia, to Boston when she encountered the northeaster of December 15, 1847. The ship carried 53 passengers and crew, including the captain's wife and son.

The initial phase of the storm was mild and foggy. A lumber ship, the Pliant, of Eastport, Maine, under Captain Reynolds, lost its way in the fog and struck on Ipswich Bar, the entire crew escaping without further incident. Captain Rolerson out at sea observing Squam Light at Gloucester, Massachusetts, believed it was Cohasset Light south of Cape Ann and tacked north to enter what he thought was Boston Harbor. In reality it was Ipswich Bay. Observing the bar lights at Ipswich and Newburyport he knew he was lost and dropped anchor three miles (5 km) from shore to wait out the storm, a fatal judgement. On the night of the 17th the temperature dropped, the full force of the storm struck the ship, she dragged anchor and struck Ipswich Bar 3/4 of a mile from Patch's Beach, as it was then called, at the foot of Castle Hill. There was a driving snow. At daybreak the residents immediately sent for help to Ipswich 5 miles (8.0 km) away. The vessel foundered in breakers throwing spray mast-high and began to disintegrate. The ship's boat was thrown in the surf, drowning three. The captain's wife and son with many passengers died of exposure in the cold wind, unable to shelter below deck. Help arrived at the beach, the remaining ship's complement were taken off at great hazard in small, open boats. The captain died within an hour of reaching safety. The residents of Ipswich opened their homes. The wreck resulted in 17 deaths. After a funeral procession winding through town they were buried in Ipswich, except for the captain and his family, who were shipped back to Belfast. Many of dead were poor immigrants headed for a new life in America.

On December 3, 1849, the Nancy with a cargo of bricks went aground on Plum Island. The crew of five were lost. On December 24, 1850, the Argus with a cargo of worked stone foundered on Emerson Rocks. The captain and some of the crew were lost. Two were trailed through the snow to a thicket, where they were found dead. The list continues: the Ornament, the Teazer, the Votary and in 1883 the City Point, a sidewheeler, on Emerson rocks. In 1802 and in 1852 the Merrimack Humane Society of Newburyport constructed shelters for cast-away mariners at Sandy Point. Only scattered stones remain. The dunes at the south end of Plum Island are strewn with massive ship timbers, some protruding from the sand at odd angles, causing visitors to speculate concerning their origin.

== Ecology ==
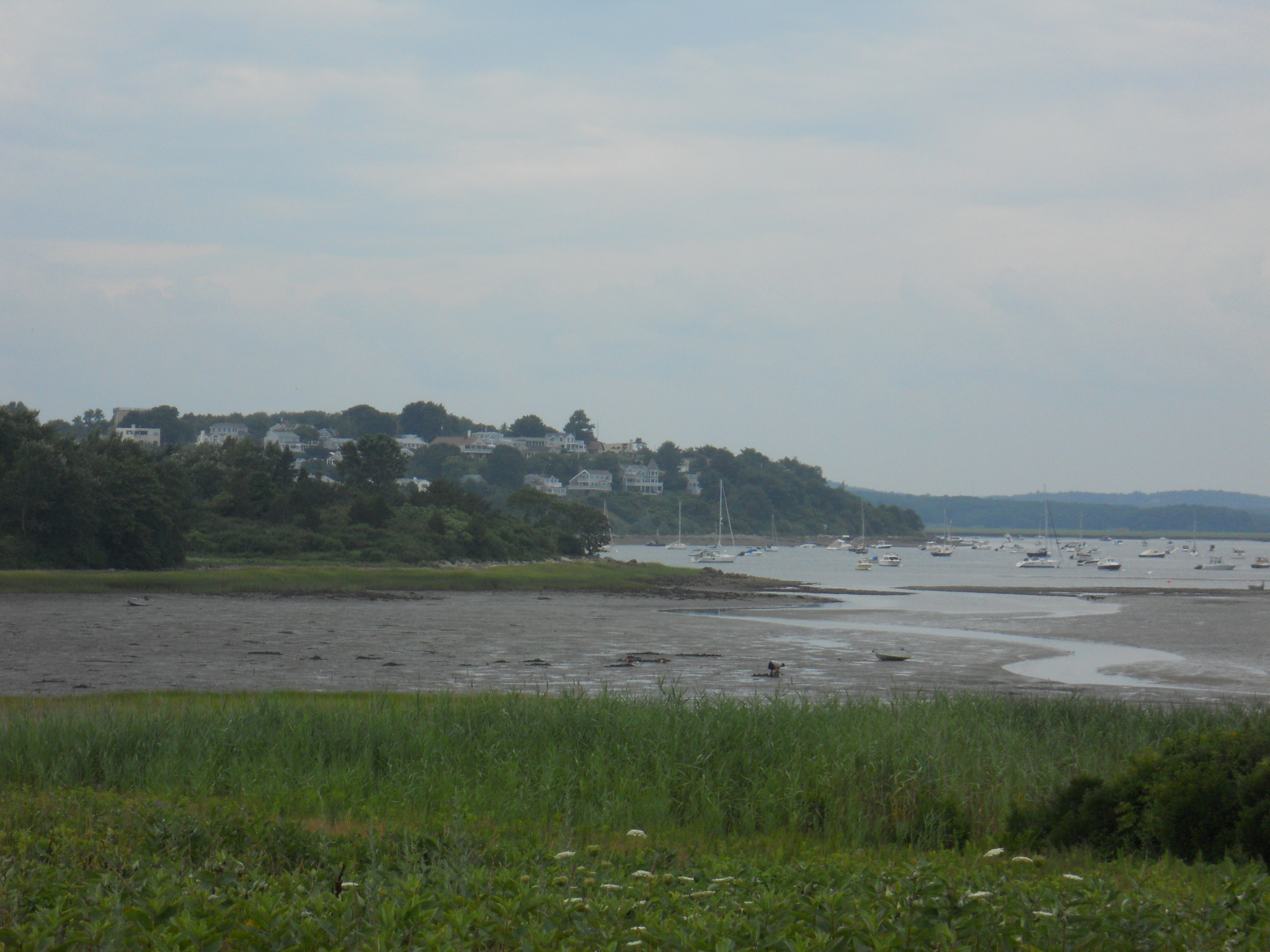
View inland from Stage Island. In the foreground is Stage Island Creek at low tide, an intertidal flat. Part of the island is shown, then Plum Island Sound, and in the background Jeffrey's Neck, Ipswich. To the right of that is the entrance to the Eagle Hill River.

The inland side of Plum Island is an estuary containing four subcategories of ecosystem: salt marsh, fresh marsh, tidal creeks and bays and intertidal flats. Over the last 50 years the system has been declining due to a decreased rate of sedimentation caused by the abandonment of farming in the region, reforestation of the former farms, and a gradual rise in sea level.

Fresh marsh is visible in Stage Island Pool. The predominant plants around its fringes are Typha latifolia (common cattail), and the intrusive species, Phragmites (common reed) and Lythrum salicaria (purple loosestrife).

Northward from Stage Island can be seen salt marsh stretching to the horizon interspersed with tidal creeks. At low tide shellfishing takes place in the intertidal flats, typically of individuals digging for clams, which are cooked and sold in all the restaurants of the region. Salt marsh features Spartina alterniflora (smooth cordgrass) and Spartina patens (marsh hay). Along the south of Plum Island some haying continues, whether government-sponsored or associated with private ownership or leases.

== Activities and amenities ==
The park offers beachcombing, fishing, restricted hunting, and walking trails. Birdwatching opportunities include a wealth of seabirds, shore birds, and field birds.

== Bibliography ==
- Waters, Thomas Franklin (1918), "Plum Island: Ipswich, Mass", Publications of the Ipswich Historical Society, vol. XXII, Ipswich Historical Society
