= George Jervis Goodhue =

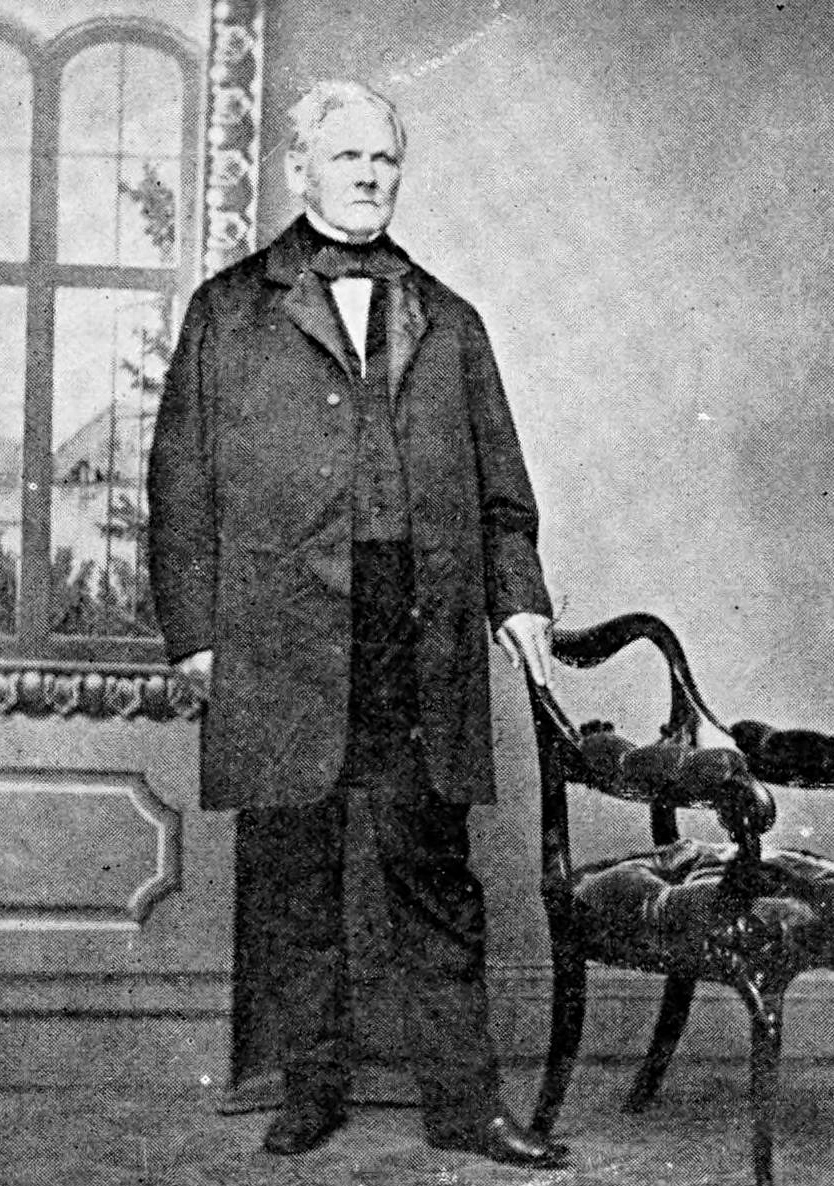

Member of the Legislative Council of the Province of Canada
- In office 1842–1867

Personal details
- Born: 1 August 1799 Putney, Vermont
- Died: 11 January 1870 (aged 70) London, Ontario

George Jervis Goodhue (1 August 1799 – 11 January 1870) was a Canadian merchant, landowner, and politician.

Born in Putney, Vermont, the son of Josiah Goodhue and Rachel Burr, Goodhue came to Canada in 1820. A merchant in London, Ontario, he owned a store, distillery and ashery. He was elected to Township of London Council in 1838. He was appointed to the Legislative Council of Canada in 1842 representing Kent Division and held the office until Confederation in 1867.

His brother Charles Frederick Henry served in the Lower Canada legislative assembly.

Upon his death, Goodhue's will left his property to his children as a life estate that would be transferred to his grandchildren afterwards. Goodhue's children agreed to a different distribution of his assets removing the life estate provisions, and applied to the Legislative Assembly of Ontario to ratify the agreement by statute without the consent of all parties, including Goodhue's trustees. The Legislature ratified the agreement through a bill, and the trustees petitioned the Governor General to disallow the enactment. Prime Minister and Justice Minister John A. Macdonald refused to disallow the enactment as it was within the powers of the provincial legislature.
