= Sarah Whipple Goodhue =

- Born: Sarah Whipple; 3 November 1641; Ipswich, Massachusetts, US
- Died: 23 July 1681 (aged 39)
- Known for: Writer
- Notable work: The Copy of a Valedictory and Monitory Writing

Sarah Whipple Goodhue (3 November 1641–23 July 1681) was an American Puritan writer from New England who is remembered for her work The Copy of a Valedictory and Monitory Writing, written seven days before her death.

== Biography ==
Goodhue was born on 3 November 1641 in Ipswich, Massachusetts to a family of middle-class merchants. She was the only child of Elder John and Susannah Whipple. As a child, Sarah was exposed to the multifaceted activities of her father, which included politics, schooling, the general court, and his rule as elder of the church. Sarah Goodhue learnt to read and write, unlike many girls of that era.

She married Deacon Joseph Goodhue in Ipswich on 13 July 1661. They had their first child within ten months of being married, and they had nine children in total. In July 1681, a week before giving birth to twins, Goodhue had a strong feeling that she would die in childbirth and wrote a pre-emptive farewell to her family in the form of The Copy of a Valedictory and Monitory Writing. At the time, she already had three sons and four daughters. Goodhue died on 23 July 1681, three days after giving birth, along with one of the twins.

== Writing ==
Valedictory (1681) represents one of the few surviving triolets from this era of American literature. Goodhue explained the timeliness of her writing was due to a premonition she would die in childbirth: "I have had of late a strong persuasion upon my mind, that by sudden death I should be surprized." Valedictory is addressed to her husband, siblings, in-laws and children, with passages that are specifically addressed to different family members. She wrote of her religious devotion and her love for her husband and children. In an evangelical tone, she compelled her "Children, neighbours and friends" to "get a part and portion of Jesus Christ". She also expressed concern at leaving her husband to look after so many children alone, urging him to place some in the care of relatives.

My first, as thy name is Joseph, labor so in knowledge to increase,

As to be freed from the guilt of thy sins, and enjoy eternal peace.

Mary, labor so to be arrayed with the hidden man of the heart,

That with Mary thou mayst find thou hast chosen the better part.

William, thou hast that name for grandfather's sake,

Labor so to tread in his steps, as over sin conquest thou mayst make.

Sarah, Sarah's daughter thou shalt be, if thou continuest in doing well,

Labor so in holiness among the daughters to walk, as that thou may excel.

So my children all, if I must be gone, I with tears bid you all farewell.

The Lord bless you all.

— Sarah Whipple Goodhue, The Copy of a Valedictory and Monitory Writing (1681)

Goodhue's writing suggests that she was a well-educated woman. Valedictory is crude at times but depicts the work of a well-practiced author, using techniques such as couplets and 17-syllable lines. The poem depicts the depth of religious experience among Puritans. It is also an example of the limited evangelical role women could play at the time, which consisted of preaching within private circles.

Valedictory was printed three times in 1770, 1805, and 1830. Women were not widely appreciated or recognized for their religious devotion during the 17th century, which is perhaps why the work was not published until the 18th century. In the 19th century, it was reported that the poem was owned by people in Ipswich and kept alongside their Bibles.
