= Parker River National Wildlife Refuge =

Protected area in Massachusetts, United States

- IUCN category IV (habitat/species management area)
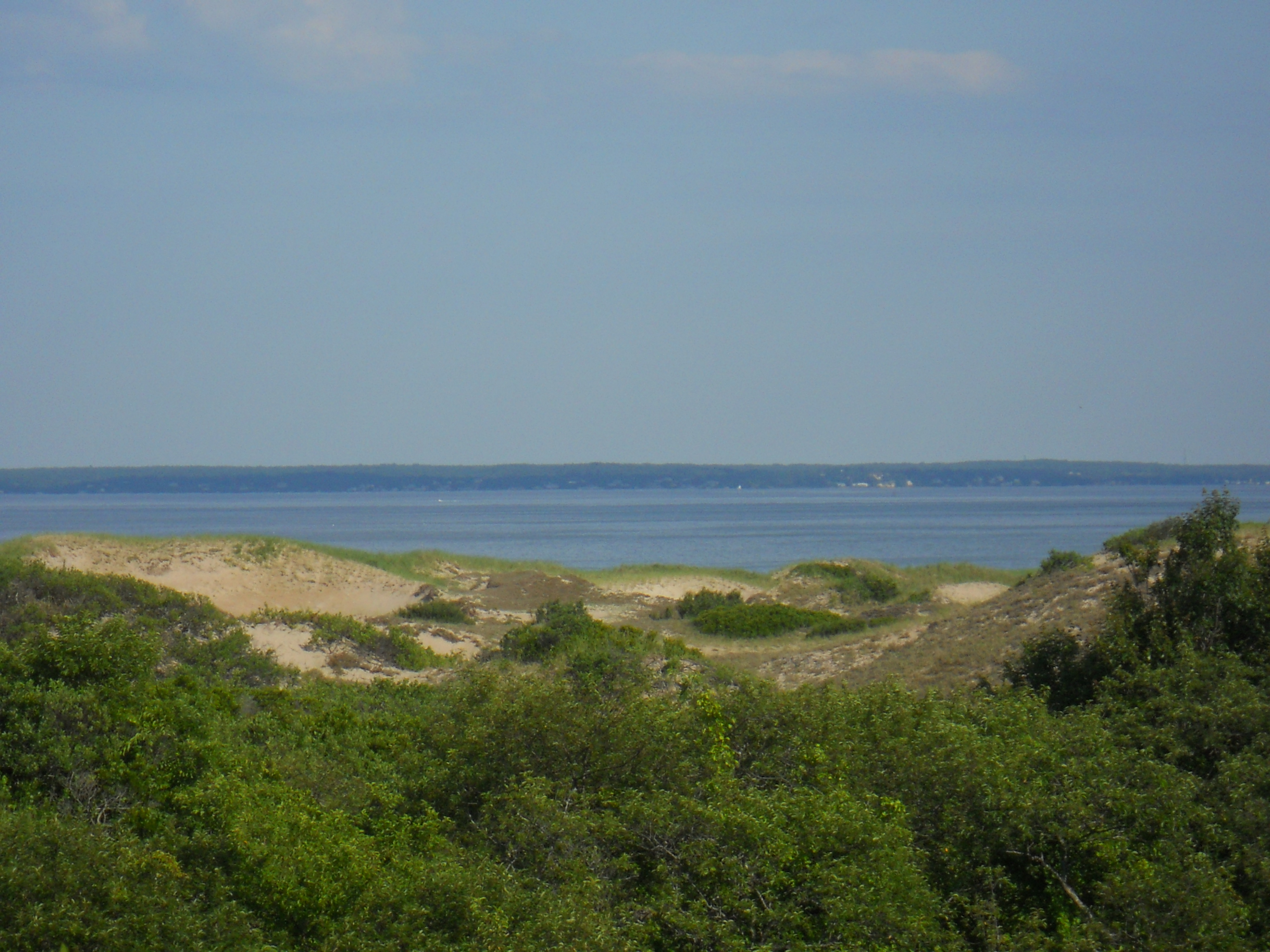
- View from the top of the dunes trail, center of refuge

- Location within Massachusetts Location within the United States
- Location: Plum Island (Massachusetts), United States
- Nearest city: Newburyport, Massachusetts
- Coordinates: 42°44′43″N 70°48′28″W
- Area: 4,662 acres (18.87 km^{2})
- Established: 1942
- Governing body: U.S. Fish and Wildlife Service
- Website: Parker River National Wildlife Refuge

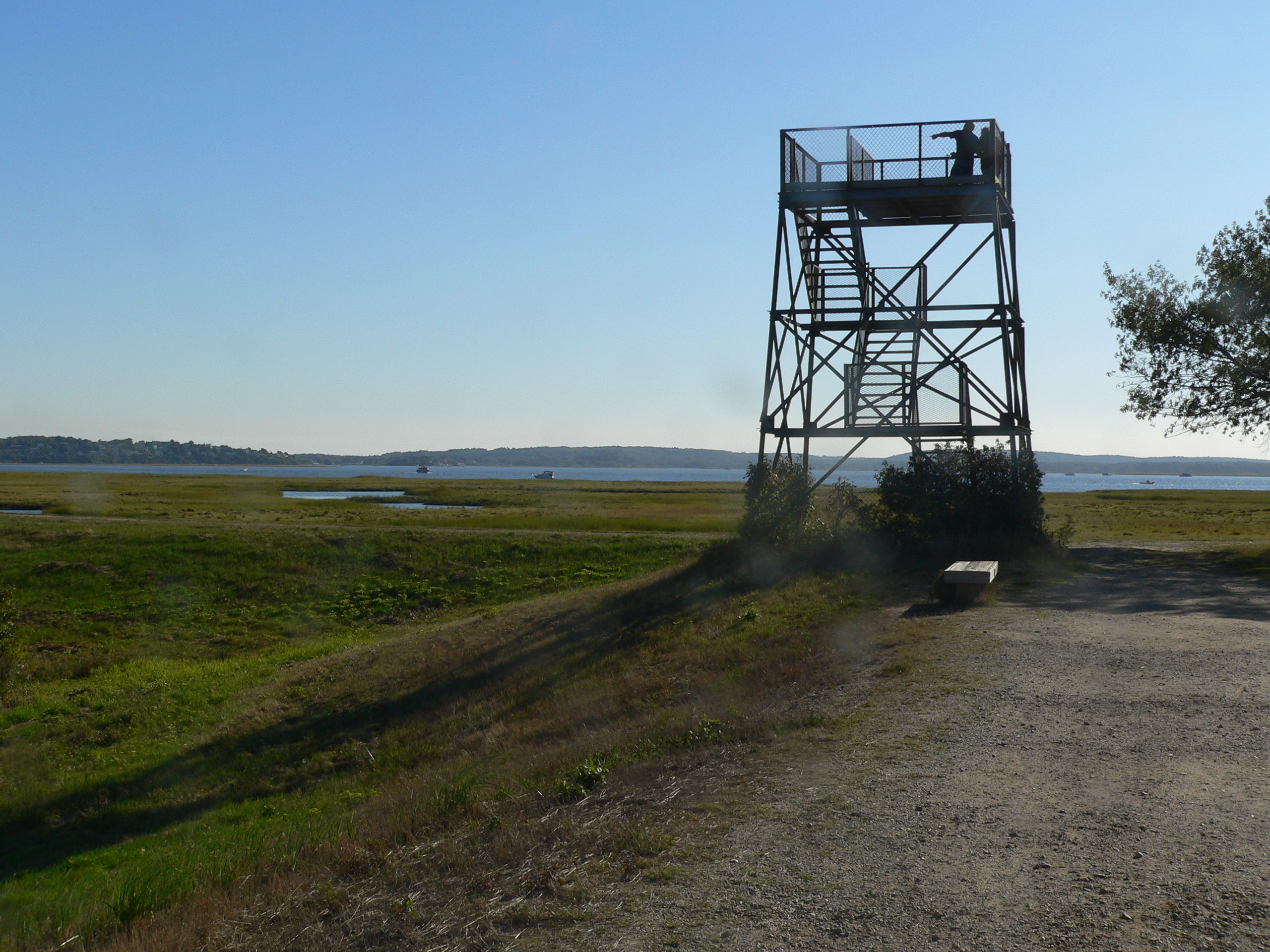
Observation tower

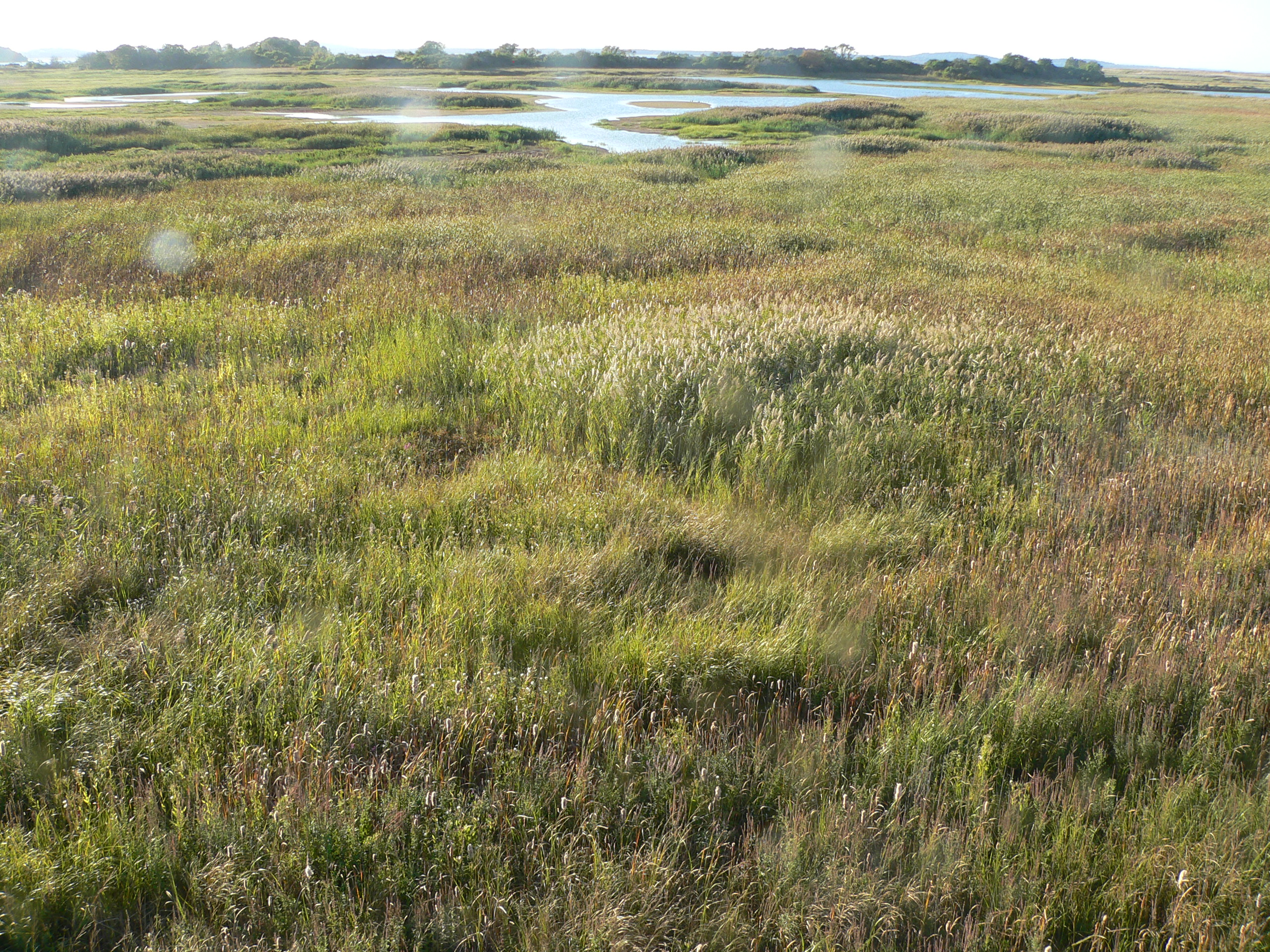
The Great Marsh

Parker River National Wildlife Refuge is a wildlife sanctuary encompassing the majority of Plum Island in northeastern Essex County, Massachusetts, 5 miles (8 km) southeast of Newburyport. It was established in 1942 primarily to provide feeding, resting, and nesting habitats for migratory birds. Located along the Atlantic Flyway, the refuge is of vital stopover significance to waterfowl, shorebirds, and songbirds during migratory periods.

In 1985, The Trust for Public Land added 12 acres (4.9 hectares) to the refuge. Besides providing habitat for birds and wildlife, the pristine coastal habitat is enjoyed by visitors who come to swim, hike, surf, fish, and birdwatch.

== Features and location ==
The refuge includes the mouth of the Parker River, which drains the mainland on the other side of Plum Island Sound. The refuge also includes the southern three-quarters of Plum Island, an 8-mile (13 km) long barrier island off the coast of mainland Essex County. The southern tip of the island, however, belongs to Sandy Point State Reservation. Trails and observation stations are scattered throughout the refuge. Included in the refuge is Plum Island Sound and all the smaller islands within it, and the mouth of the Plum Island River on the Plum Island Sound side only. The marsh in and around the winding channels of the rivers is known as Great Marsh, which has a much greater area than the refuge.

Hiking, jogging and cycling along Plum Island Drive only is permitted any time the refuge is open. Photography is permitted from any location open to the public. Beach locations may be visited over boardwalks out of nesting season. Trailers and licensed fishing are permitted on the beach in the autumn. Access is via roads through the dunes. Licensed deer hunting is permitted for one day of the year up to a maximum limit of kills. The process is controlled by the park employees and volunteers. Seasonal licensed commercial shellfishing is permitted at one location where a stream through the marsh bends close to the island. Licensed seasonal wildfowl hunting is permitted in a special area on the right bank of the Parker River. It must be accessed from the mainland side. New visitor facilities offering exhibits and programs are located on the mainland bordering Plum Island Airport. Any other activities within the refuge are strictly forbidden; the brochure presents a long list.

The refuge consists of 4,662 acres (18.87 km^{2}) of diverse habitats including sandy beach and dune, shrub/thicket, bog, swamp, freshwater marsh, saltwater marsh and associated creek, river, mudflat, and newly created salt pannes. These and other refuge habitats support varied and abundant populations of resident and migratory wildlife including more than 300 species of birds and additional species of mammals, reptiles, amphibians, insects, and plants.

The ecology of the island, however, is not in its original state, due to earlier draining of Great Marsh by parallel channels and destabilization of the dunes by overuse. Much of the inland side of the island was cleared for farming. The farmers also used the marsh grass for haying and pasturing animals. In the waters, the chemical pollution of the Merrimack River and the damming of its stream at a number of locations totally changed the character of the fish and the bird species that fed on them. Even today coastal currents from the Merrimack in flood deposit unacceptable levels of debris on the beach, which are typically removed in public campaigns.

The creation of the reservation involved the purchase and evacuation of the farmland, the stabilization of the dunes by planting Black Pine, an intrusive Alpine species, and the enhancement of biodiversity by the creation of artificial fresh-water pools on the inland side. More recently heavy equipment was used to replace the parallel channels with unconnected pools in some places, recreating the original marsh. Since the prohibition of the public from the beach in the summer, seals from the Atlantic have been basking there.

== See also ==
- National Wildlife Refuge
- Plum Island (Massachusetts)
- Sandy Point State Reservation
