= Ralph B. Goodhue =

American politician

Ralph Bigelow Goodhue (January 27, 1878 – January 18, 1960) was an American farmer and politician.

Goodhue was born in Northfield, Rice County, Minnesota. He went to Carleton Academy and to Carleton College. Goodhue also went to the University of Minnesota School of Agriculture. He lived in Dennison, Minnesota with his wife and family and was a farmer. Bigelow served in the Minnesota Senate from 1943 to 1950. He died in Rice County, Minnesota.
