= Charles Frederick Henry Goodhue =

Canadian politician

Charles Frederick Henry Goodhue (c. 1785 – c. 1840) was an entrepreneur, farmer and political figure in Lower Canada. He represented Sherbrooke in the Legislative Assembly of Lower Canada from 1830 to 1834.

Goodhue was born in Putney, Vermont, the son of Josiah Goodhue and Rachel Burr. In 1819, he was living in Sherbrooke, Quebec, where he manufactured axes. Goodhue was a justice of the peace and was also registrar for Sherbrooke County from 1830 to 1837. He voted against the Ninety-Two Resolutions. In 1838, Goodhue was invited to become a member of the Special Council which governed the province after the Lower Canada Rebellion but refused. He died in Chicago.

His brother George Jervis served as a member of the Legislative Council of Upper Canada.
