= RST =

RST may refer to:

== Businesses and organisations ==
- Renault Sport Technologies, a former name of the motorsport vehicle division of Renault
- Rhodesian Selection Trust, a former Northern Rhodesian mining company
- Rosetta Stone (company) (NYSE stock ticker symbol), a language education software company
- Royal Society of Tasmania, a Tasmanian scientific organisation

== Places ==
- Rochester International Airport, Minnesota, US (by IATA code)
- Royal Shakespeare Theatre, Stratford-upon-Avon, England

== Science and technology ==
=== Computing ===
- reStructuredText (file extension .rst), a lightweight markup language
- RST, the reset flag in the Transmission Control Protocol
- Intel Rapid Storage Technology, a computer storage technology
- Reverse semantic traceability, a software quality control method

=== Medicine and psychology ===
- Rapid strep test, for strep throat
- Reading span task, a memory span test
- Reinforcement sensitivity theory, a psychological theory

=== Other uses in science and technology ===
- R-S-T system (or RST code), a method of reporting radio signal quality
- RST model, a model of general relativity
- The reference, second, and third phases, in a three-phase electric system
- Nancy Grace Roman Space Telescope, a NASA infrared satellite telescope
- Rhetorical structure theory, a linguistic theory of text organization

== Other uses ==
- Registered Safe Technician, a basic safe-cracking qualification
- Retail sales tax
- Romance Standard Time or Central European Time
