= 1881 Wisconsin lieutenant gubernatorial election =

- November 8, 1881
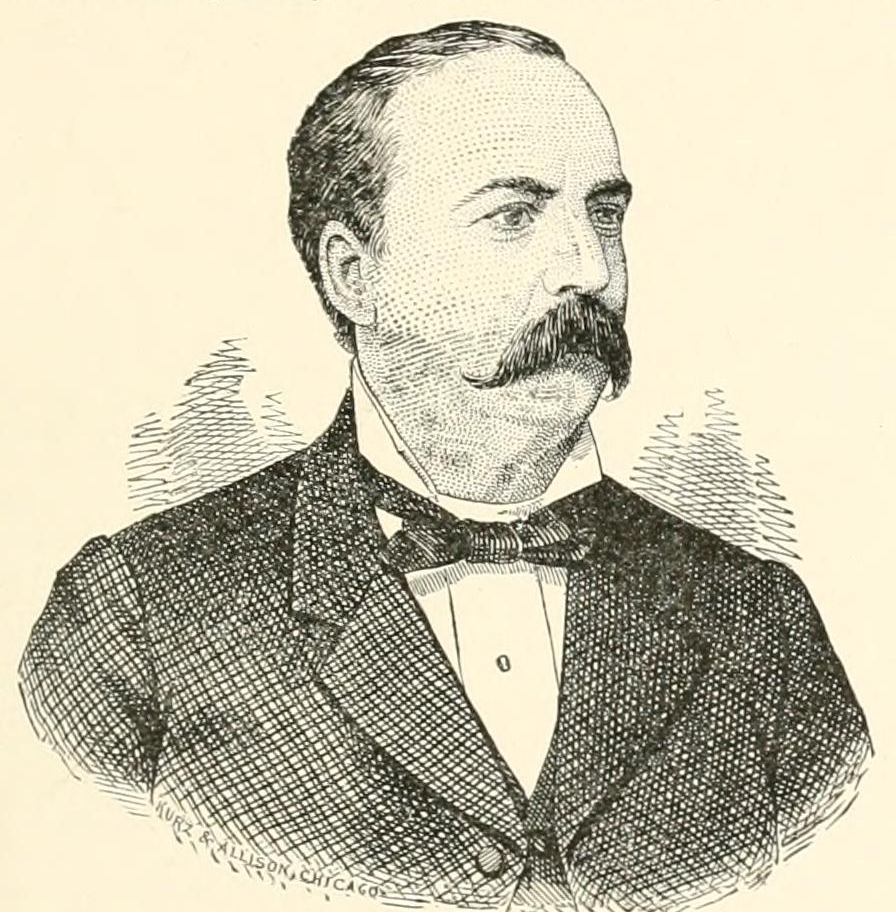

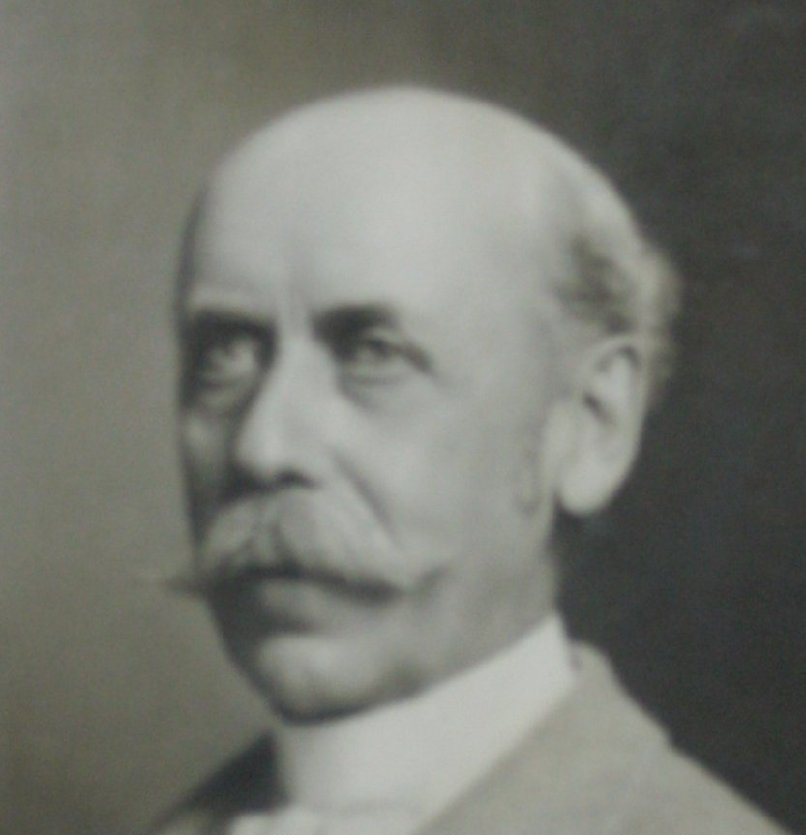

Nominee	Sam Fifield	Wendell Abraham Anderson	Harvey Clapp
Party	Republican	Democratic	Prohibition
Popular vote	83,502	69,304	12,247
Percentage	48.59%	40.33%	7.13%
Lieutenant Governor before election
James M. Bingham
Republican
Elected Lieutenant Governor
Sam Fifield
Republican

The 1881 Wisconsin lieutenant gubernatorial election was held on November 8, 1881, in order to elect the lieutenant governor of Wisconsin. Republican nominee and former Speaker of the Wisconsin State Assembly Sam Fifield defeated Democratic nominee and incumbent chairman of the Democratic Party of Wisconsin Wendell Abraham Anderson, Prohibition nominee and former member of the Wisconsin State Assembly Harvey Clapp and Greenback nominee and former member of the House of Representatives of the Wisconsin Territory David Giddings.

== General election ==
On election day, November 8, 1881, Republican nominee Sam Fifield won the election by a margin of 14,198 votes against his foremost opponent Democratic nominee Wendell Abraham Anderson, thereby retaining Republican control over the office of lieutenant governor. Fifield was sworn in as the 14th lieutenant governor of Wisconsin on January 2, 1882.

=== Results ===
Wisconsin lieutenant gubernatorial election, 1881
Party	Candidate	Votes	%
Republican	Sam Fifield	83,502	48.59
Democratic	Wendell Abraham Anderson	69,304	40.33
Prohibition	Harvey Clapp	12,247	7.13
Greenback	David Giddings	6,711	3.91
	Scattering	74	0.04
Total votes		171,838	100.00
Republican hold			
