= CGHS model =

Toy model of general relativity

The Callan–Giddings–Harvey–Strominger (CGHS) model is a toy model of general relativity in 1 spatial and 1 time dimension. It is named after Curtis Callan, Steven Giddings, Jeffrey A. Harvey and Andrew Strominger, who published on it in 1992.

== Overview ==
General relativity is a highly nonlinear model, and as such, its 3+1D version is usually too complicated to analyze in detail. In 3+1D and higher, propagating gravitational waves exist, but not in 2+1D or 1+1D. In 2+1D, general relativity becomes a topological field theory with no local degrees of freedom, and all 1+1D models are locally flat. However, a slightly more complicated generalization of general relativity which includes dilatons will turn the 2+1D model into one admitting mixed propagating dilaton-gravity waves, as well as making the 1+1D model geometrically nontrivial locally. The 1+1D model still does not admit any propagating gravitational (or dilaton) degrees of freedom, but with the addition of matter fields, it becomes a simplified, but still nontrivial model. With other numbers of dimensions, a dilaton-gravity coupling can always be rescaled away by a conformal rescaling of the metric, converting the Jordan frame to the Einstein frame. But not in two dimensions, because the conformal weight of the dilaton is now 0. The metric in this case is more amenable to analytical solutions than the general 3+1D case. And of course, 0+1D models cannot capture any nontrivial aspect of relativity because there is no space at all.

This class of models retains just enough complexity to include among its solutions black holes, their formation, FRW cosmological models, gravitational singularities, etc. In the quantized version of such models with matter fields, Hawking radiation also shows up, just as in higher-dimensional models.

== Action ==
A very specific choice of couplings and interactions leads to the CGHS model.

$$S = \frac{1}{2\pi} \int d^2x\, \sqrt{-g}\left\{ e^{-2\phi} \left[ R + 4\left( \nabla\phi \right)^2 + 4\lambda^2 \right] - \sum^N_{i=1} \frac{1}{2}\left( \nabla f_i \right)^2 \right\}$$

where g is the metric tensor, $\phi$ is the dilaton field, f_{i} are the matter fields, and λ^{2} is the cosmological constant. In particular, the cosmological constant is nonzero, and the matter fields are massless real scalars.

This specific choice is classically integrable, but still not amenable to an exact quantum solution. It is also the action for Non-critical string theory and dimensional reduction of higher-dimensional model. It also distinguishes it from Jackiw–Teitelboim gravity and Liouville gravity, which are entirely different models.

The matter field only couples to the causal structure, and in the light-cone gauge ds^{2} = − e^{2ρ} du,dv, has the simple generic form

$$f_i\left( u, v \right) = A_i\left( u \right) + B_i \left( v \right)$$,

with a factorization between left- and right-movers.

The Raychaudhuri equations are

$e^{-2\phi} \left( - 2\phi_{,vv} + 4 \rho_{,v}\phi_{,v} \right) + f_{i,v}f_{i,v}/2= 0$ and
$$e^{-2\phi} \left( - 2\phi_{,uu} + 4 \rho_{,u}\phi_{,u} \right) + f_{i,u}f_{i,u}/2= 0$$.

The dilaton evolves according to

$$\left( e^{-2\phi} \right)_{,uv} = - \lambda^2 e^{-2\phi}e^{2\rho}$$,

while the metric evolves according to

$$2\rho_{,uv} - 4\phi_{,uv} + 4\phi_{,u}\phi_{,v} + \lambda^2 e^{2\rho} = 0$$.

The conformal anomaly due to matter induces a Liouville term in the effective action.

=== Black hole ===
A vacuum black hole solution is given by

$$ds^2 = - \left( \frac{M}{\lambda} - \lambda^2 uv \right)^{-1} du\, dv$$
$$e^{-2\phi} = \frac{M}{\lambda} - \lambda^2 uv$$,

where M is the ADM mass. Singularities appear at uv = λ^{−3}M.

The masslessness of the matter fields allow a black hole to completely evaporate away via Hawking radiation. In fact, this model was originally studied to shed light upon the black hole information paradox.

== See also ==
- dilaton
- general relativity
- quantum gravity
- RST model
- Jackiw–Teitelboim gravity
- Liouville gravity
