= Wendell Anderson (disambiguation) =

Wendell Anderson could refer to:

- Wendell Abraham Anderson (1840–1929), former Chairman of the Democratic Party of Wisconsin
- Wendell R. Anderson (1933–2016), American hockey player, politician, and former governor of Minnesota
- Wendell T. Anderson (1929–2009), American politician from Georgia
