= David Giddings =

19th century American politician

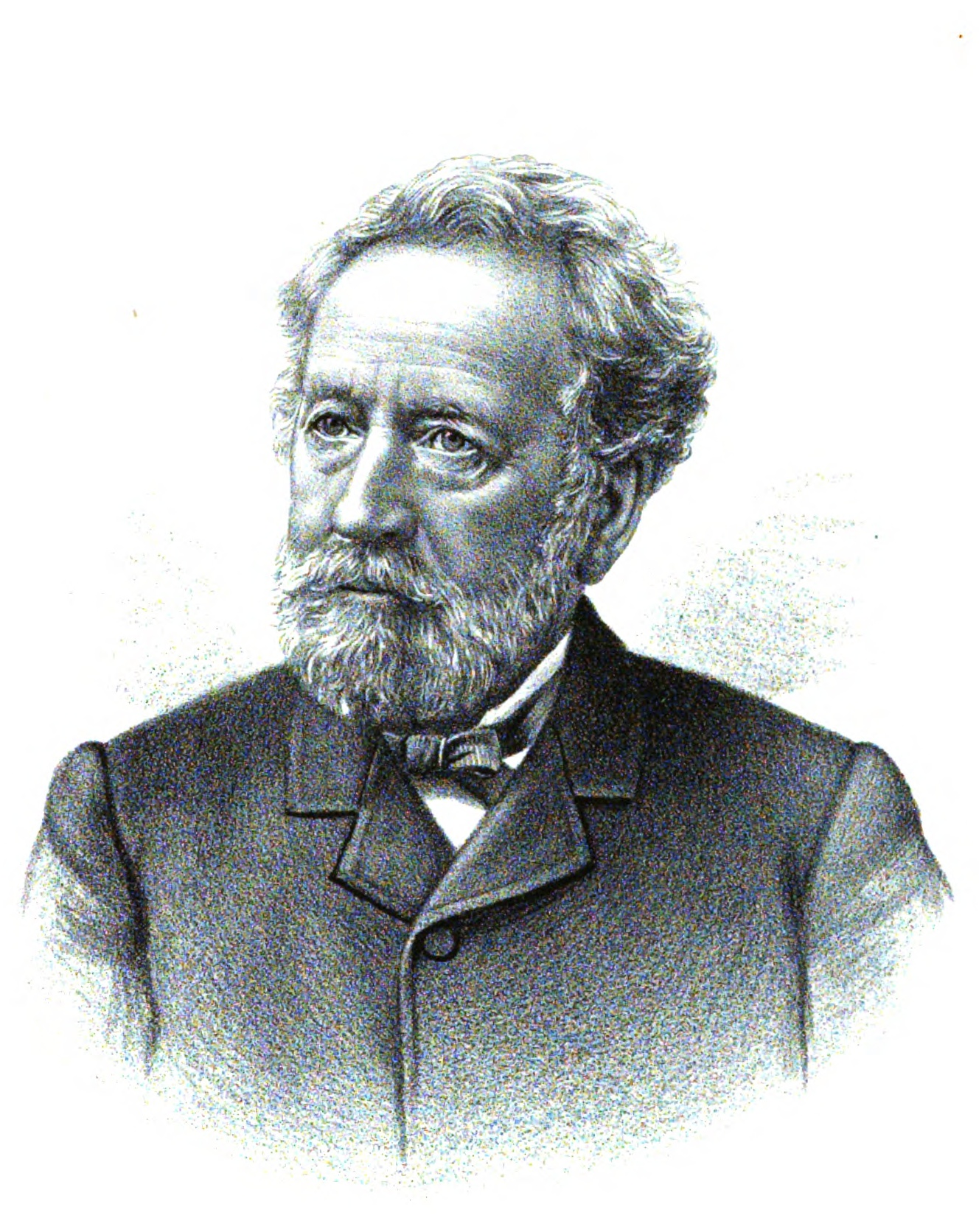
- From Portrait and biographical album of Fond du Lac County, Wisconsin (1889)

Member of the House of Representatives of the Wisconsin Territory for Brown, Fond du Lac, Manitowoc, Portage, & Sheboygan counties
- In office November 2, 1840 – November 7, 1842 Serving with Albert G. Ellis, & Mason C. Darling
- Preceded by: Ebenezer Childs, Charles C. Sholes, Barlow Shackleford, Jacob W. Conroe
- Succeeded by: Albert G. Ellis, Mason C. Darling & David Agry

Personal details
- Born: July 24, 1806 Ipswich, Massachusetts, U.S.
- Died: October 26, 1900 (aged 94) Sheboygan Falls, Wisconsin, U.S.
- Resting place: Sheboygan Falls Cemetery, Sheboygan Falls, Wisconsin
- Party: Greenback Party (1874–1889); Republican (1854–1874); Whig (before 1854)
- Spouse: Dorothy Chapin Trowbridge (m. 1842; died 1897)
- Children: Harvard Giddings^{(b. 1843; died 1937)}; Clara Giddings^{(b. 1848; died 1870)}; George Giddings^{(b. 1852)}

David R. Giddings (July 24, 1806 – October 26, 1900) was an American surveyor, civil engineer, and Wisconsin pioneer. He served in the 2nd Wisconsin Territorial Assembly, representing the northeast quadrant of the Wisconsin Territory, and was a delegate to the first Wisconsin constitutional convention. He was responsible for the initial surveys of dozens of Wisconsin towns in Brown, Dodge, Fond du Lac, Kenosha, Racine, Sheboygan, and Winnebago counties.

== Early life ==
David Giddings was born in Ipswich, Massachusetts. He received a liberal education in Ipswich and studied civil engineering. At age 19, he started work as a merchant in the city. He sold liquor for some time, but after seeing the effect of alcohol on his customers, he discontinued the sale.

== Pioneer years and surveying career ==
In the Spring of 1835, he determined to move to the west. He sold out his merchandise stock and traveled over land to Buffalo, then took a ship to Chicago. Initially, he planned to go south to Peoria, but instead teamed with a carpenter to rig a makeshift skiff and sail north on Lake Michigan to Milwaukee. A storm forced them to go ashore early at Waukegan, and they subsequently walked to the site of Racine, Wisconsin, towing their skiff. After a brief stop with the sole inhabitant at Racine, they continued north to the Milwaukee River and finally met Solomon Juneau residing there.

Juneau attempted to persuade them to remain at Milwaukee, but Giddings determined to continue north to Green Bay. He arrived at Green Bay on July 4, just over two months since his departure from Massachusetts.

At Green Bay, he was hired to build fences for Albert Gallatin Ellis for $20 per month. Ellis had been appointed to survey the nearby town of Astor, as well as several towns in the southeast corner of the state (now Racine and Kenosha counties). Due to his civil engineering education, Ellis contracted out much of the work to Giddings. The next year, Giddings was contracted for twelve more surveys at the headwaters of the Rock River, in what is now northern Dodge County and western Fond du Lac County. He then surveyed all the land between Lake Winnebago and the Wolf River, comprising much of present-day Winnebago County.

After surveying in Sheboygan County, Giddings decided to set his permanent residence in the area of Sheboygan, Wisconsin, in 1837. He quickly built a store in the settlement. When Sheboygan County was formally organized for judicial purposes, Giddings was elected the first county judge, and also had jurisdiction for Manitowoc County, which was not yet organized. He served two years.

He purchased a sawmill west of Sheboygan in 1838, along with about 500 acres of forested land around the mill, which would ultimately become much of the village of Sheboygan Falls. He built the first shingle mill in the state of Wisconsin and subsequently built or purchased several other mills. He worked to build up a settlement at Sheboygan Falls by selling off parcels of land for homes. Through his mills, he employed the new settlers and sold lumber to them to build their homes. He worked diligently to improve the prospects of Sheboygan Falls and Sheboygan County, and surveyed a railroad route for free to ensure a new road from Chicago to Green Bay would pass through Sheboygan Falls.

== Political career ==
In the Fall of 1840, while he was working on a survey of lands west of Green Bay, he was elected to the House of Representatives of the Wisconsin Territory to represent the northeast quadrant of the state. He served at both sessions of the 2nd Wisconsin Territorial Assembly. In 1846, as Wisconsin was preparing for statehood, he was elected to the convention to draft a state constitution.

Politically, Giddings began as a member of the Whig Party and moved into the new Republican Party when it was organized in 1854. He was a candidate for Wisconsin State Senate in 1856, running on the Republican ticket, but was not successful. He was then a candidate for Wisconsin State Assembly in 1859, but lost to another Republican, Oran Rogers, in a three-way contest.

When the Greenback Party was organized in the 1870s, Giddings became a member of that party. He was a Greenback nominee for United States Congress in 1878, and for lieutenant governor of Wisconsin in 1881.

== Later years ==
Giddings's grave (leftmost) at Sheboygan Falls Cemetery

In 1863, he purchased a large farm in the town of Empire, Wisconsin, in Fond du Lac County—previously known as the "Macy farm". Giddings initially gave the farm to his son, Harvard, to manage, but made it his own permanent residence in 1874.

Giddings ultimately lived into his nineties on his farm in Empire. When his health began to fail, he moved back to his Sheboygan Falls homestead, which was then managed by his son, Harvard. He died there on October 26, 1900, and was buried at Sheboygan Falls Cemetery.

== Personal life and family ==
David Giddings was a son of Joshua Giddings of Ipswich, Massachusetts. Joshua Giddings was a third cousin of Joshua Reed Giddings. The Giddings were descendants of George Giddings, who emigrated from England to the Massachusetts Bay Colony in 1635.

David Giddings married Dorothy Trowbridge on June 7, 1842, in Sheboygan County. Dorothy Trowbridge was also a pioneer settler of Sheboygan County; she was born in Worcester County, Massachusetts, and emigrated to Wisconsin with her parents in the 1830s. David and Dorothy Giddings had three children, Harvard, Clara, and George. Clara died at age 22, but the sons survived their parents. Harvard Giddings (sometimes erroneously referred to as "Howard") took over the family estate in Sheboygan Falls.

== Electoral history ==
=== Wisconsin Assembly (1859) ===
Wisconsin Assembly, Sheboygan 3rd District Election, 1859
Party	Candidate	Votes	%	±%
General Election, November 8, 1859
Republican	Oran Rogers	474	39.57%	
Republican	David Giddings	426	35.56%	
Democratic	Walsh	298	24.87%	
Plurality		48	4.01%	
Total votes		1,198	100.0%	
Republican gain from Democratic				

=== U.S. House of Representatives (1878) ===
Wisconsin's 5th Congressional District Election, 1878
Party	Candidate	Votes	%	±%
General Election, November 5, 1878
Democratic	Edward S. Bragg (incumbent)	12,392	46.18%	−12.03%
Republican	Hiram N. Smith	10,285	38.33%	−3.46%
Greenback	David Giddings	4,157	15.49%	
Plurality		2,107	7.85%	-8.57%
Total votes		26,834	100.0%	-20.08%
Democratic hold				

=== Wisconsin Lieutenant Governor (1881) ===
Wisconsin Lieutenant Gubernatorial Election, 1881
Party	Candidate	Votes	%	±%
General Election, November 8, 1881
Republican	Sam S. Fifield	83,592	47.97%	−4.97%
Democratic	Wendell A. Anderson	69,304	39.77%	+0.77%
Prohibition	Harvey S. Clapp	12,247	7.03%	
Greenback	David Giddings	6,711	3.85%	−2.95%
Plurality		14,288	8.20%	-5.74%
Total votes		174,247	100.0%	-8.70%
Republican hold				

Party political offices
Preceded by William L. Utley	Greenback nominee for Lieutenant Governor of Wisconsin; 1881	Succeeded by Milan Ford
