= Burnham-Patch House =

Historic house in Massachusetts, United States

- U.S. National Register of Historic Places
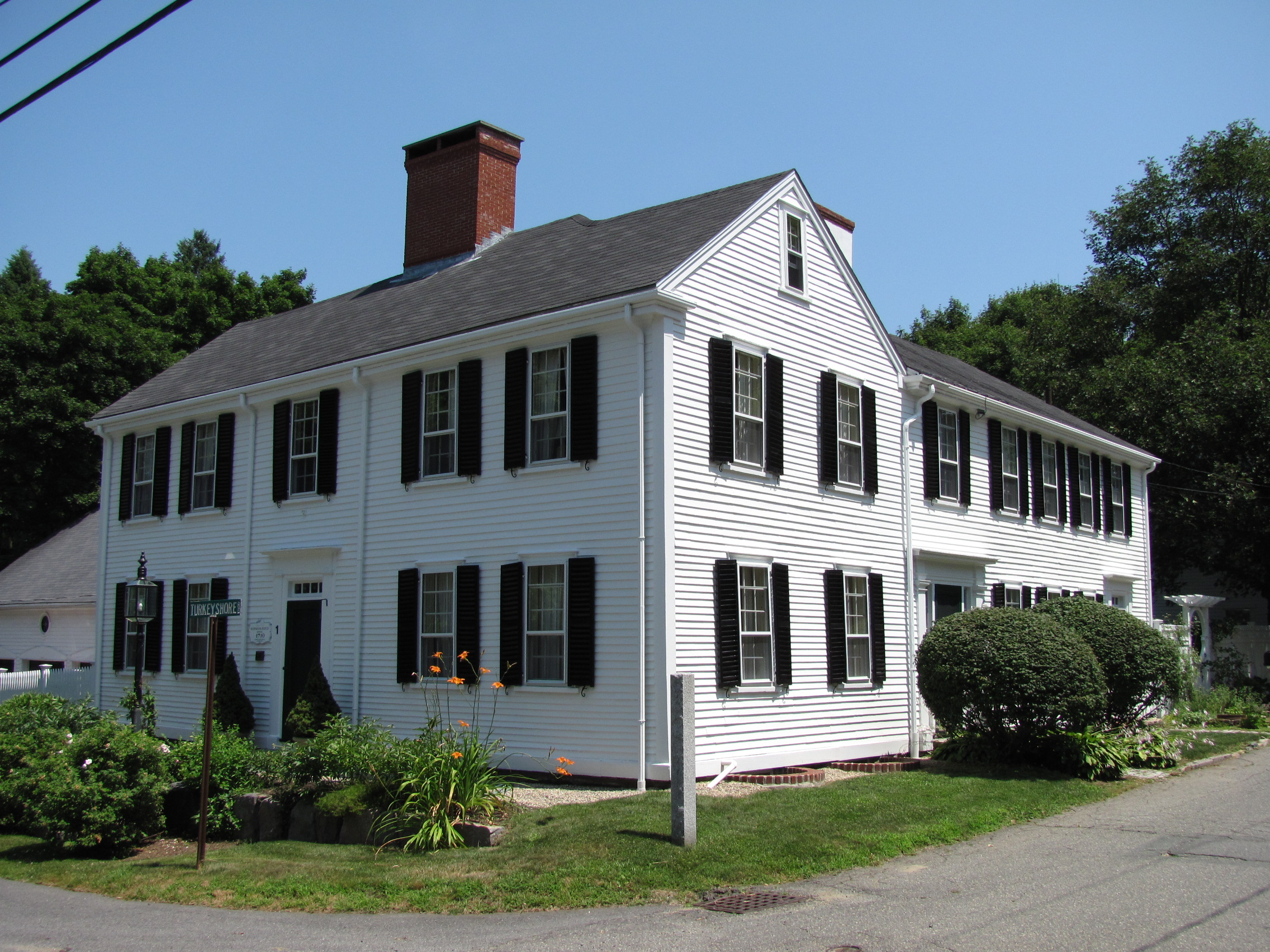
- Burnham-Patch House

- Location within Massachusetts Location within the United States
- Location: Ipswich, Massachusetts
- Coordinates: 42°40′35″N 70°50′1″W
- Built: 1730
- Architectural style: Colonial
- MPS: Central Village, Ipswich, Massachusetts MRA
- NRHP reference No.: 80000452
- Added to NRHP: September 17, 1980

The Burnham-Patch House is a historic house at 1 Turkey Shore Road in Ipswich, Massachusetts. The 2 1/2-story Colonial stands on a plot of land purchased by Thomas Burnham in 1667, occupying a prominent position on Turkey Shore Road, a historically important path to the coast. The house itself appears to have been built around 1730, with evidence that some of its beams were reused from an older, 17th century, structure. Its irregular interior floorplan suggests that it may have been built following the old house's floorplan. The property remained in the Burnham family until 1795, when it was sold to Colonel John Patch, a leading local figure in the American Revolutionary War. In 1814 the house was purchased by Abner Day, who operated a tavern on the premises for many years.

The house was listed on the National Register of Historic Places in 1980. It is under a local preservation restriction.

== See also ==
- James Burnham House, owned by Thomas Burnham's son
- Giddings-Burnham House, also owned by Thomas Burnham
- National Register of Historic Places listings in Ipswich, Massachusetts
- National Register of Historic Places listings in Essex County, Massachusetts
