= Joannes Brothers Company =

American wholesaler and retailer of grocery products

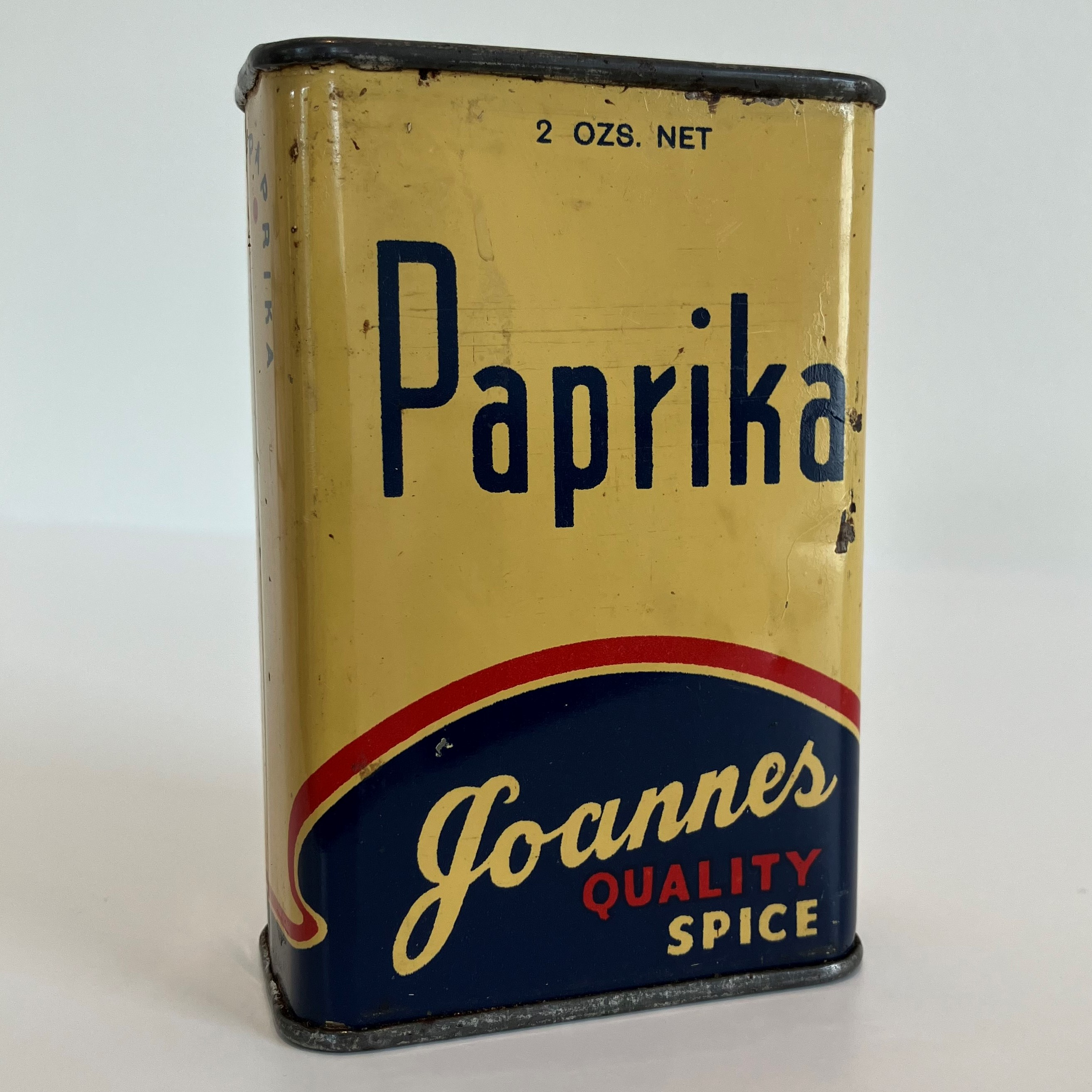
- Paprika sold under the Joannes Quality label of Joannes Brothers Company of Green Bay
- Type: Private
- Industry: Wholesaling
- Founded: Green Bay, Wisconsin (1872; 154 years ago)
- Defunct: November 5, 1955
- Fate: Acquired by Supervalu, Inc.
- Headquarters: Green Bay, Wisconsin, US
- Area served: Wisconsin, Michigan
- Key people: Lee Joannes
- Products: Supermarkets, wholesale foods, private labels, coffee and spices

Joannes Brothers Company was a wholesaler and retailer of grocery products based in Green Bay, Wisconsin that served the Upper Midwest for over 80 years. The company began as a small retail operation in 1872, growing into an interstate distributor by the turn of the century. The rise of Joannes Brothers was closely linked with the growth of Green Bay and the industrialization of the Great Lakes region, initiating some of the first business transactions that established Green Bay as a regular market. It was acquired by Minnesota-based SuperValu in 1955. A separate venture, initially operating under the same name, was established by an original Joannes Brothers Company founder in Los Angeles in 1905. The operation was acquired by McCormick & Company in 1953.

== History ==
Joannes Brothers Company was founded in Green Bay, Wisconsin as a retail grocer by brothers Charles, Mitchell, Thomas, and William Joannes. The Joannes brothers had immigrated from Tervuren, Belgium as children in 1856, initially settling on a farm in Lawrence township, southwest of Green Bay. After the death of their father in 1858, the family left their farm and integrated with the growing Green Bay community. The brothers held jobs in various industries during the 1860s and early 1870s, including postal work, jeweler apprentice, farm hand, clerk, bookkeeper, and traveling salesman. In 1872, confident in their trade skills and business experience, the brothers opened a small retail grocery operation on North Washington Street in Green Bay.

Taking advantage of Green Bay's Lake Michigan port and extension of railroads north of Chicago, the firm imported a wide variety of agricultural products, raw coffee, and other soft commodities to grow its operation, in addition to expanding the wholesale distribution of local products such as cheese. Surviving through the financial panic of 1873, the Joannes Brothers Company added a wholesale branch in 1877.

Due to the success of the wholesale operation, Joannes Brothers discontinued its retail business in 1884 to focus exclusively on the wholesale market. The firm expanded its operations to include a spice mill, coffee roaster, riverfront warehouse, and oil warehouse, as well as installing the first telephone line in the city between its downtown office and its gardens in the town of Preble. By the late 1880s, Joannes Brothers had outgrown its founding location and re-located further up the Fox River, completing a four-story granite structure in the Romanesque Revival style in 1891. Growing demand at the turn of the century also necessitated construction of a six-story distribution facility, a riverfront warehouse, and new spice mill. Additionally, in 1889, the Chicago, Milwaukee, St. Paul and Pacific Railroad laid an industrial rail spur – the Alley Track – through downtown Green Bay, bisecting the Joannes Brothers complex and allowing for direct loading and unloading at the company facility.

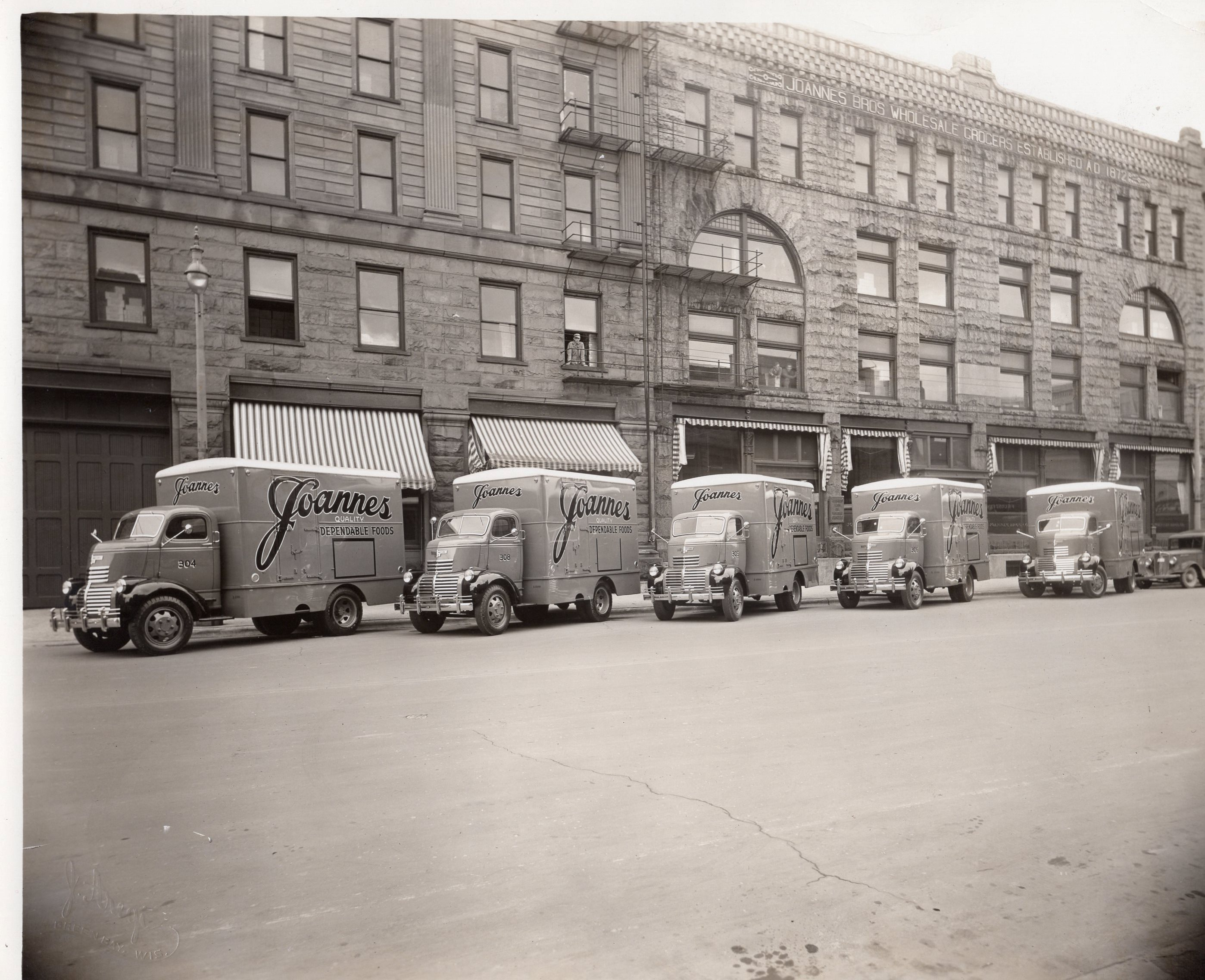
Delivery trucks outside Joannes Brothers Company in Green Bay, Wisconsin in the 1930s

In the early 1900s, co-founder and vice president Charles Joannes began traveling to California for health reasons and established business contacts in the West Coast wholesale industry. In 1905, he founded a second Joannes Brothers operation in Los Angeles, and opened the company's first purpose-built facility in 1907. Charles Joannes subsequently resigned as vice president of the Green Bay operation in 1912 and turned his full attention to growing the Joannes Brothers’ distribution of coffee, tea, and spices from the Los Angeles firm. In 1917, that firm completed a 46,000 square foot, John Parkinson-designed facility near downtown Los Angeles that still stands.

The 1920s was a period of significant change for the firm as management passed to the second generation of Joannes family members. In Green Bay, Harold and Leland Joannes succeeded their fathers, Mitchell and Thomas, respectively. Leland Joannes also joined the Green Bay Packers board of directors and became the team's treasurer in 1923. In Los Angeles, Ralph Joannes succeeded his father, Charles, overseeing the merger of Joannes Brothers, Puritas Coffee & Tea Company, and San Diego Coffee Company to form Coffee Products of America in 1930.

In Green Bay, Joannes Brothers tried to modernize its business model by consolidating accounts under wholesale and cash-and-carry operations. The latter being established in five locations in northeastern Wisconsin. The company also re-entered the retail grocery space with four supermarkets in Green Bay. Leland Joannes retired from Joannes Brothers Company in 1945, vacating the vice president position. He remained president of the Green Bay Packers until 1947, thereafter serving as chairman of the board, vice president, and director emeritus over the next three decades.

By 1951, after only five years, Joannes Brothers ended its retail foray in Green Bay by selling its supermarkets to Sure Way Stores. In November 1955, Super Valu, Inc. of Minnesota purchased the Joannes Brothers Company operation in Green Bay to expand its midwestern reach. At the time of its acquisition, Joannes Brothers served 170 independent retail grocers in northeastern Wisconsin and the Upper Peninsula of Michigan. The firm lived on briefly as the Green Bay Division of Super Valu, Inc. In that time, the company vacated the sprawling, but antiquated, downtown location for a modern facility in Green Bay's suburbs. By 1959, the City of Green Bay began to raze aging downtown commercial structures in association with urban renewal projects of the 1960s and 1970s, and by 1994 all infrastructure of the former Joannes Brothers Company had been demolished.

In the 1940s, Coffee Products of America, the successor to Joannes Brothers Company in Los Angeles, evolved into Ben-Hur Products, Inc. – leveraging its household name recognition in the southwestern United States. Ben-Hur Products, Inc. expanded to a second large coffee roasting and food processing plant near downtown Los Angeles in 1950, before being purchased by McCormick & Company in 1953. McCormick continued roasting and spice mill operations from the original Joannes Brothers locations until 1959.

== Product labels ==
Joannes Brothers Company of Los Angeles, known as Coffee Products of America after 1930, primarily distributed under the Ben-Hur label. The Green Bay operation distributed under several private labels.

These were the private label brands for Joannes Brothers Company in Green Bay:

- Joannes Quality – Store generic brand, offering a broad range of products from food staples and locally milled spices, to household cleaning products
- Martha Washington – Food staples and household products
- Peerless – Tobacco products
- Sunset Club – Coffee

== Legacy ==
The Joannes Brothers Company founders and heirs in Green Bay, who retained upward of 95% ownership of the company until it was sold in 1955, donated liberally to local philanthropic causes. In 1919, founders Charles, Mitchell, and Thomas Joannes donated 40 acres of property along Green Bay's East River to the city of Green Bay, becoming Joannes Park. The park today includes an aquatic center, skate park (original park swimming pool), and a minor league baseball stadium. Additionally, Mitchell Joannes' funding made possible the construction of the Downtown YMCA in 1924.

The homes of the company founders are on the National Register of Historic Places as part of Green Bay's Astor Historic District – containing examples of the architectural styles spanning the period 1835 to 1920. The Mitchell Joannes house, specifically, is a fine example of a Châteauesque-style residence, constructed of Belgian brick and rusticated stone.
