= Giddings (surname) =

Giddings is a locational surname derived from a group of villages in Cambridgeshire, England, called Great Gidding, Little Gidding and Steeple Gidding.

== List of people with the surname Giddings ==
- David Giddings (1806–1900), American territorial legislator, engineer, and businessman
- Dewitt Clinton Giddings (1827–1903), American politician
- Franklin Henry Giddings (1855–1931), an American sociologist and economist
- Harry Giddings, Jr. (1884–1949), a Canadian trainer and breeder of horses
- J. Calvin Giddings (1930-1996), US American chemistry professor
- J. Wight Giddings (1858–1933), American politician
- Joshua Reed Giddings (1795–1864), an American statesman and a prominent opponent of slavery
- Joshua Giddings (cyclist) (born 2003), British racing cyclist
- Lara Giddings (born 1972), an Australian politician, Premier of Tasmania
- Marsh Giddings (1816–1875), a US politician
- Napoleon Bonaparte Giddings (1816–1897), United States Senator
- Paula Giddings (born 1947), a writer and African-American historian
- Ruth Giddings (1911–2015), Irish contract bridge player
- Steven Giddings, American physicist
- Stuart Giddings (born 1986), an English footballer
