= Giddings-Burnham House =

Historic house in Massachusetts, United States

- U.S. National Register of Historic Places
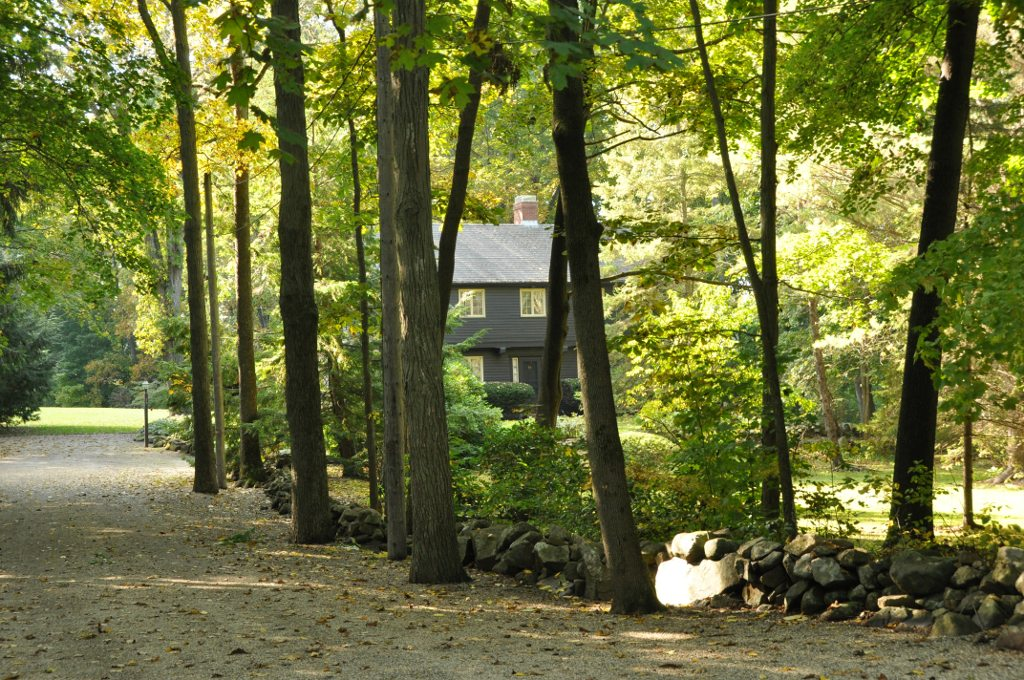

- Location within Massachusetts Location within the United States
- Location: 37 Argilla Road, Ipswich, Massachusetts
- Coordinates: 42°40′25″N 70°49′54″W
- Built: c. 1640 (Traditional) c. 1685 (NRHP)
- Architectural style: Colonial
- MPS: First Period Buildings of Eastern Massachusetts TR
- NRHP reference No.: 90000233
- Added to NRHP: March 9, 1990

The Giddings-Burnham House is a historic house in Ipswich, Massachusetts. The house was probably built in the 1640s by George Giddings and was sold to his brother-in-law Thomas Burnham. The earliest documentation for this property was the deed of sale between George Giddings and Thomas Burnham in 1667 negating previous thoughts that the house was not built until 1680. The original house has been expanded and renovated and has a plaque on the door from the Ipswich Historical Commission stating that the home was built before 1667 by George Giddings.

The house was listed on the National Register of Historic Places in 1990.

== See also ==
- George Giddings House and Barn
- Burnham-Patch House, also owned by Thomas Burnham
- James Burnham House, owned by Burnham's son
- National Register of Historic Places listings in Ipswich, Massachusetts
- National Register of Historic Places listings in Essex County, Massachusetts
