= Gidding =

Gidding is a surname. Notable people with the surname include:

- Charles Gidding (1853–1943), United States Navy sailor
- John Gidding (born 1977), American architect, actor and model

== See also ==
- Great Gidding, village in Cambridgeshire, England
- Little Gidding, village in Cambridgeshire, England
- Giddings (disambiguation)
