= Jeffrey A. Harvey =

American physicist (b. 1955)

Jeffrey A. Harvey (born February 15, 1955, in San Antonio, Texas) is an American string theorist at the University of Chicago.

== Scientific contributions ==
Among Harvey's many contributions to the field of theoretical physics, he is one of the co-discoverers of the heterotic string, along with David Gross, Emil Martinec, and Ryan Rohm. The four physicists were colloquially known as the "Princeton string quartet".

Harvey is a fellow of the American Physical Society and of the American Academy of Arts and Sciences. In 2013, he received the Quantrell Award. He is a trustee at the Institute for Advanced Study in Princeton, New Jersey.

He received the Dirac Medal in 2023.

== Selected publications ==
- Callan, Curtis G.; Giddings, Steven B.; Harvey, Jeffrey A.; Strominger, Andrew (1992-02-15). "Evanescent black holes". Physical Review D. 45 (4). American Physical Society (APS): R1005–R1009. arXiv:hep-th/9111056. doi:10.1103/physrevd.45.r1005. ISSN 0556-2821. PMID 10014472. S2CID 5840401.
- Dixon, L.; Harvey, J.A.; Vafa, C.; Witten, E. (1985). "Strings on orbifolds". Nuclear Physics B. 261. Elsevier BV: 678–686. doi:10.1016/0550-3213(85)90593-0. ISSN 0550-3213.
- Dixon, L.; Harvey, J.; Vafa, C.; Witten, E. (1986). "Strings on orbifolds (II)". Nuclear Physics B. 274 (2). Elsevier BV: 285–314. doi:10.1016/0550-3213(86)90287-7. ISSN 0550-3213.
- Gross, David J.; Harvey, Jeffrey A.; Martinec, Emil; Rohm, Ryan (1985). "Heterotic string theory (I). The free heterotic string". Nuclear Physics B. 256. Elsevier BV: 253–284. doi:10.1016/0550-3213(85)90394-3. ISSN 0550-3213.
- Gross, David J.; Harvey, Jeffrey A.; Martinec, Emil; Rohm, Ryan (1986). "Heterotic string theory: (II). The interaciton heterotic string". Nuclear Physics B. 267 (1). Elsevier BV: 75–124. doi:10.1016/0550-3213(86)90146-x. ISSN 0550-3213.
- Gross, David J.; Harvey, Jeffrey A.; Martinec, Emil; Rohm, Ryan (1985-02-11). "Heterotic String". Physical Review Letters. 54 (6). American Physical Society (APS): 502–505. doi:10.1103/physrevlett.54.502. ISSN 0031-9007. PMID 10031535.

== See also ==
- CGHS model
