= Giddings =

Giddings may refer to:

- Giddings (surname)
- Giddings, Texas
- Mount Giddings, a mountain in Antarctica
- Giddings Peak, a mountain in Antarctica
- Giddings Hall, Georgetown College
- Giddings Road Covered Bridge, a bridge in Ohio, United States
- George Giddings House and Barn, a historic farm in Massachusetts, United States
