= Junction Trio =

- Origin: New York City
- Genres: Classical; Chamber
- Years active: 2015–present
- Members: Conrad Tao (piano); Stefan Jackiw (violin); Jay Campbell (cello)
- Website: www.jcttrio.com

The Junction Trio is a classical "supergroup" composed of three already accomplished musicians. Noted for their performances Beethoven, Dvořák and John Zorn, they have performed at venues around the world, including Carnegie Hall in their home town of New York City.
