= Hongcheon Pi clan =

Korean clan from Gangwon Province

- Country: Korea
- Current region: Hongcheon County
- Founder: Pi Wi jong
- Connected members: Pi Chun-deuk

Hongcheon Pi clan (Korean: 홍천 피씨; Hanja: 洪川 皮氏) was one of the Korean clans. Their Bon-gwan was in Hongcheon County, Gangwon Province, South Korea. According to the research in 2000, the number of Hongcheon Pi clan was 1143. Their founder was Pi Wi jong. He was a Jinwu Guard Commander (Hanja: 金吾後衛指揮) in Yuan dynasty. He was dispatched as a special envoy during Chungnyeol of Goryeo’s reign in Goryeo. After that, he was naturalized and began Hongcheon Pi clan because Pi In seon (Hanja: 皮寅善), a eldest brother of Pi Wi jong, was chosen as Prince of Hongcheon (Hanja: 洪川君).

== See also ==
- Korean clan names of foreign origin
