= So-Young Pi =

South Korean physicist

So-Young Pi (Korean: 피서영; born 1946) is a South Korean physicist.

So-Young Pi's father was the Korean writer Pi Chun-deuk. She attended Seoul National University, graduating with a degree in physics, before moving to the United States to pursue a doctorate in the subject at the State University of New York at Stony Brook. Pi then completed postdoctoral research at Rockefeller University and the Massachusetts Institute of Technology. During her postdoctoral research, Pi met and later married fellow physicist Roman Jackiw. The two had a son, violinist Stefan Jackiw.

Pi taught at Boston University and was granted emeritus status upon retirement. In 2014, she was elected a fellow of the American Physical Society, which recognized her "[f]or her seminal contributions to the phenomenon of density fluctuations in theories of cosmic inflation."
