= Roman Jackiw =

Theoretical physicist (1939–2023)

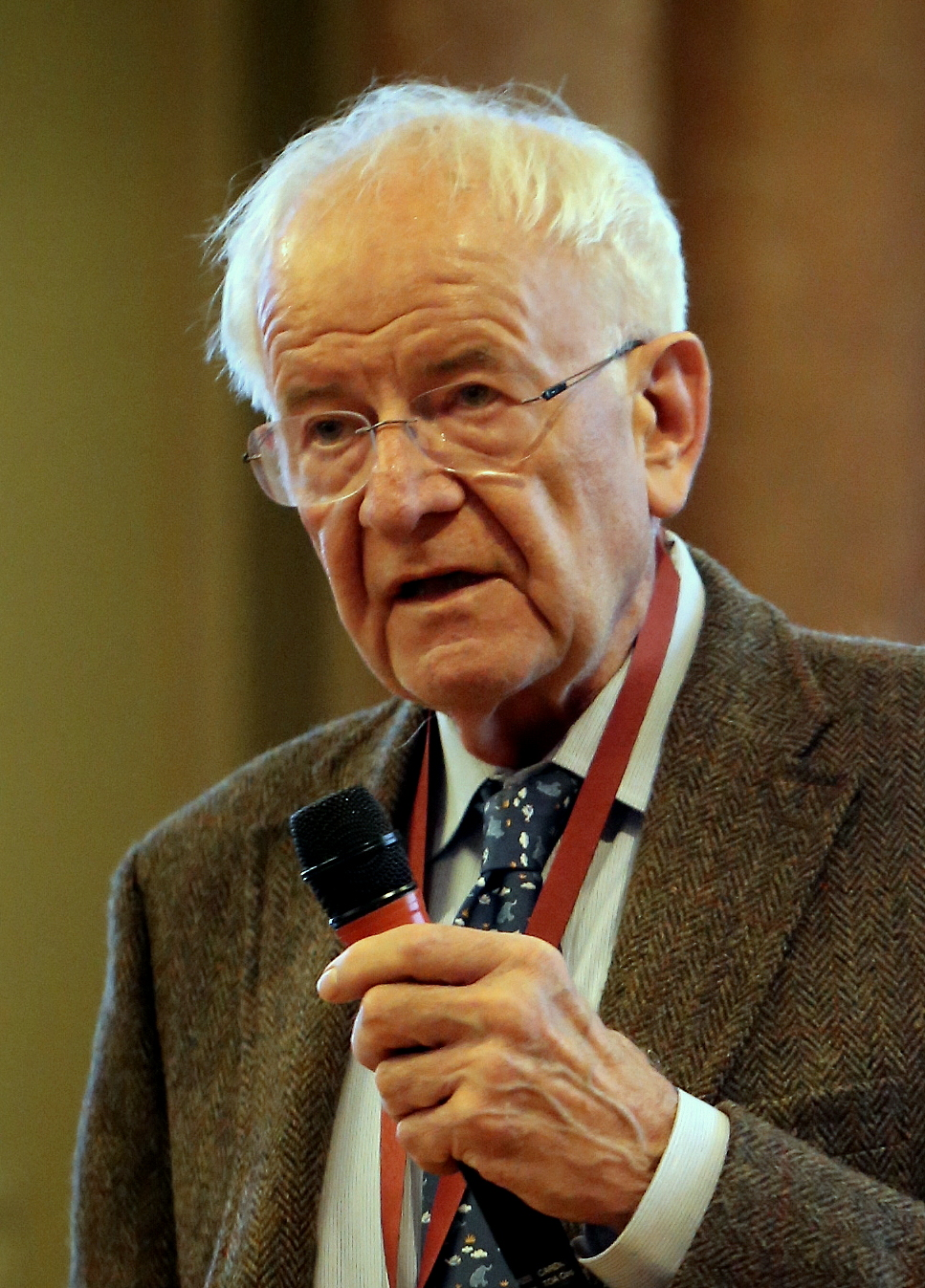
- Jackiw in 2013
- Born: 8 November 1939; Lubliniec, General Government (now Poland)
- Died: 14 June 2023 (aged 83); Cambridge, Massachusetts, U.S.
- Education: Swarthmore College (BA); Cornell University (PhD)
- Known for: Adler–Bell–Jackiw anomaly Jackiw–Teitelboim gravity Theta vacuum
- Children: Stefan Jackiw; Nicholas Jackiw
- Awards: Dirac Medal (1998); Heineman Prize (1995)
- Scientific career
- Fields: Physics
- Workplaces: MIT
- Thesis: Nonperturbative solutions of the Bethe-Salpeter equation for the vertex function (1966)
- Doctoral advisor: Hans Bethe; Kenneth G. Wilson
- Doctoral students: Andrea diSessa; Andrew Strominger; Joseph Lykken

Roman Wladimir Jackiw (Note: Ukrainian: Роман Володимир Яцків, romanized: Roman Volodymyr Yatskiv) (/ˈroʊmɑːn ˈdʒɑːkiːv/; Polish: [ˈrɔman ˈjakʲiv]; November 8, 1939 – June 14, 2023) was an American theoretical physicist and Dirac Medallist.

== Early life and education ==
Jackiw was born in Lubliniec, Poland, in 1939 to a Ukrainian family that moved to Austria and Germany before settling in New York City when Jackiw was about 10.

Jackiw earned his undergraduate degree from Swarthmore College and his PhD from Cornell University in 1966 under Hans Bethe and Kenneth Wilson. He was a professor at the Massachusetts Institute of Technology Center for Theoretical Physics from 1969 until his retirement. He retained his affiliation in emeritus status in 2019.

== Career ==
Jackiw co-discovered the chiral anomaly, which is also known as the Adler–Bell–Jackiw anomaly. In 1969, he and John Stewart Bell published their explanation, later expanded and clarified by Stephen L. Adler, of the observed decay of a neutral pion into two photons. This decay is forbidden by a symmetry of classical electrodynamics, but Bell and Jackiw showed that this symmetry is not preserved at the quantum level. Their introduction of an "anomalous" term from quantum field theory required that the sum of the charges of the elementary fermions be zero. This work also gave important support to the color theory of quarks.

Jackiw is also known for Jackiw–Teitelboim gravity, often abbreviated as JT Gravity, a theory of gravity with one dimension each of space and time that includes a dilaton field. Sometimes known as the R = T model, it is used to model some aspects of near-extremal black holes.

== Personal life ==
Jackiw married fellow physicist So-Young Pi, daughter of Korean writer Pi Chun-deuk. Jackiw's sons are the violinst Stefan Jackiw and Nicholas Jackiw, a software designer known for inventing The Geometer's Sketchpad. His daughter, Simone Ahlborn, is an educator at Moses Brown School in Providence, Rhode Island.

Jackiw died on 14 June 2023, aged 83.

== Awards ==
- Heineman Prize, 1995
- Honorary doctorate from the Faculty of Science and Technology at Uppsala University, 2000
