= National Safeman's Organization =

North American safe-cracking trade association

The National Safeman's Organization (NSO) is one of North America's largest trade associations of safe and vault technicians. It provides technical training in safe-cracking at periodic "Penetration Parties" and offers three levels of certification:

- Registered Safe Technician (RST)
- Certified Journeyman Safecracker (CJS)
- Certified Master Safecracker (CMS)

The organization was formed in the fall of 1992 between National Publishing and safe expert Dave McOmie. Mr. McOmie has served continuously as the organization's director. The NSO publishes a quarterly newsletter, The National Safeman.

== Registered Safe Technician ==
Registered Safe Technician (RST) is a qualification awarded to members of the National Safeman's Organization who have passed the required test.

This is the first of three levels of certification offered by NSO. To receive the title, a candidate must demonstrate knowledge of parts and lock identification, combination changing and basic servicing, lock facts, and troubleshooting. Passing this test is a prerequisite for taking the level 2 test, for Certified Journeyman Safecracker.

== Certified Journeyman Safecracker ==
Certified Journeyman Safecracker (CJS) is the second of three levels of certification offered by NSO. Registered Safe Technicians are eligible to test for this title. They must demonstrate knowledge of tools and techniques, dial-to-lock identification, round doors, square doors, and fire safes. Passing this test is a prerequisite for taking the tests to become a Certified Master Safecracker.

== Certified Master Safecracker ==
Certified Master Safecracker (CMS) is the third level offered by NSO. Candidates for the title must have already completed the first two levels of accreditation. Only then may they apply to take the written and practical tests to become Certified Master Safecrackers. The testing involves information detailing all aspects of the safe technician's trade, covering antique safes, GSA containers, vault doors, and high-security containers.

The written sections concentrate on testing the candidates' research and safe identification skills. The practical sections tests the individuals' actual competence (as opposed to theoretical competence) in trouble shooting, combination lock manipulation, and offset drillpoint transferring skills.

The CMS accreditation has been available to safe technicians since 1997, and is proctored by the National Safeman's Organization.
