= Pi Chun-deuk =

South Korean writer (1910–2007)

- Born: April 21, 1910
- Died: May 25, 2007 (aged 97)
- Writing career
- Language: Korean

Korean name
- Hangul: 피천득
- Hanja: 皮千得
- RR: Pi Cheondeuk
- MR: P'i Ch'ŏndŭk

Pi Cheon-deuk (Korean: 피천득; April 21, 1910 – May 25, 2007), also known by their pen name Geum-a, was a Korean poet and an English literature scholar, but primarily an essayist.

== Biography ==
Born in Seoul, Korean Empire on April 21, 1910, his pen name was Geum-a. He majored in English literature at Hujiang University (formally University of Shanghai) in Shanghai. He was a professor at Seoul National University from 1946 – 1974 and taught many students. Before liberation he concentrated on poetic composition and English poetry as an instructor at Gyeongseong Central Business Institute, and after liberation he taught the arts at Gyeongseong University and later taught at Seoul National University.

In 1954, he studied English literature at Harvard University by invitation of the United States Department of State. He started his literary pursuits in 1930, publishing the poem "Seojungsogok" in magazine Sindonga. His first collection of poems Lyrical Poetical Works was well-received as a simple and beautiful poem describing nature and the heart.

Though a famous writer, he was known as a plain, free and easy person. He lived among books in a small apartment.

Pi's daughter So-Young studied physics, and married fellow physicist Roman Jackiw. Pi's grandson is the American violinist Stefan Jackiw.

== Work ==
Pi's major works are A Piece of Silver Coin and Affinity.

Pi initially established himself as a poet with the publication of his poem "Seojeongsogok" (서정소곡, Short Lyrical Piece) in Shindong-a (신동아, New Dong-a) in 1930, followed by the publication of "sogok" (소곡, Musical Sketch) and "Gasin nim" (가신 님, My Lover Has Gone). The distinguishing feature of his poetry is its that it excludes all ideas and thoughts and praises the beauty of pure emotion. He also published various essays, including "Nunborachineun bamui chueok" (눈보라 치는 밤의 추억, Memory of a Snowy Night), "Gidarineun pyeonji" (기다리는 편지, The Waiting Letter), "Muje" (무제, Untitled), and "Naui pail" (나의 파일, My File). Generally, through a clear and consistent delineation of feeling, he portrayed a life overflowing with a poetic sentiment based on a pure sentiment that excludes all thoughts, idea, and subjects. Because his essays are beautifully express the emotions of everyday life through an intimate and delicate style, they tend to read like prosaic lyric poetry. Thus, his essays are regarded as representative works of the lyrical-contemplative essay. In 1947 he gathered all his works that lyrically sang of nature and a childlike heart and published the anthology Seojeongsijip (서정시집, Collection of Lyrical Poetry). In his 1969 anthology, Sanhowa jinju (산호와 진주, Coral and Pearl), he expressed his unattainable aspiration through the metaphor of the coral and pearl, contributing a beautiful and lyrical poem and essay. His "Supil" (수필, Essay), a piece on essay theory written in the form of an essay, deals with the nature and characteristics of the essay. He also published works on English literature such as "Ellijabeseujoui gyususiin" (Elizabethan Female Poets) and "Seikseupieoui soneteu" (Shakespeare's Sonnets). Among his other works are Seojeongsijip, Geuma simunseon (Geuma Poetry Anthology), A Flute Player (플루트 연주자), and Sanhowa jinju (Coral and Pearl).

He depicted ordinary subjects in a simple and delicate way which could be enjoyed by many people regardless of age or gender. The main works Affinity, Essay, Flute Player can be found in Korean textbooks as part of a regular school curriculum.

== Published books ==
- Original essays: Affinity, Life
- Translations: My Favorite Poems, Sonnets

== Awards ==
- 1995: Inchon Award
