= Wendell T. Anderson =

American politician

Member of the Georgia House of Representatives from the 8th district
- In office January 10, 1977 – January 12, 1987
- Preceded by: Roger Morton Johnson
- Succeeded by: Allyn Prichard

Personal details
- Born: Wendell Thomas Anderson; April 26, 1929 Canton, Georgia, U.S.
- Died: March 23, 2009 (aged 79) Canton, Georgia, U.S.
- Party: Democratic
- Spouse: Dorothy Price (m. 1948)
- Children: 2

Wendell Thomas Anderson (April 26, 1929 – March 23, 2009) was an American politician from Georgia.

== Early life and education ==
Anderson was born in Canton, Georgia, in 1929. After graduating from Canton High School in 1948, he worked as an electrical contractor. He was employed by Lockheed Aircraft, and then Southern Railway.

== Political career ==
Anderson's political career began in 1967, when he began serving on the Cherokee County Board of Education. He remained on the board until his election to the Georgia House of Representatives in 1976.

A member of the Democratic Party, Anderson served in the state house for 10 years.

== Personal life ==
Anderson was a lifelong Methodist. He died on March 23, 2009, and was survived by his wife and two children.
