= RST model =

Conformal anomaly free CGHS model

The Russo–Susskind–Thorlacius model or RST model in short is a modification of the CGHS model to take care of conformal anomalies and render it analytically soluble. In the CGHS model, if we include Faddeev–Popov ghosts to gauge-fix diffeomorphisms in the conformal gauge, they contribute an anomaly of −24. Each matter field contributes an anomaly of 1. So, unless N=24, we will have gravitational anomalies. To the CGHS action

$S_{\text{CGHS}} = \frac{1}{2\pi} \int d^2x\, \sqrt{-g}\left\{ e^{-2\phi} \left[ R + 4\left( \nabla\phi \right)^2 + 4\lambda^2 \right] - \sum^N_{i=1} \frac{1}{2}\left( \nabla f_i \right)^2 \right\}$, the following term
$$S_{\text{RST}} = - \frac{\kappa}{8\pi} \int d^2x\, \sqrt{-g} \left[ R\frac{1}{\nabla^2}R - 2\phi R \right]$$

is added, where κ is either $(N-24)/12$ or $N/12$ depending upon whether ghosts are considered. The nonlocal term leads to nonlocality. In the conformal gauge,

$$S_{\text{RST}} = -\frac{\kappa}{\pi} \int dx^+\,dx^- \left[ \partial_+ \rho \partial_- \rho + \phi \partial_+ \partial_- \rho \right]$$.

It might appear as if the theory is local in the conformal gauge, but this overlooks the fact that the Raychaudhuri equations are still nonlocal.
