= James Burnham House =

Historic house in Massachusetts, United States

- U.S. National Register of Historic Places
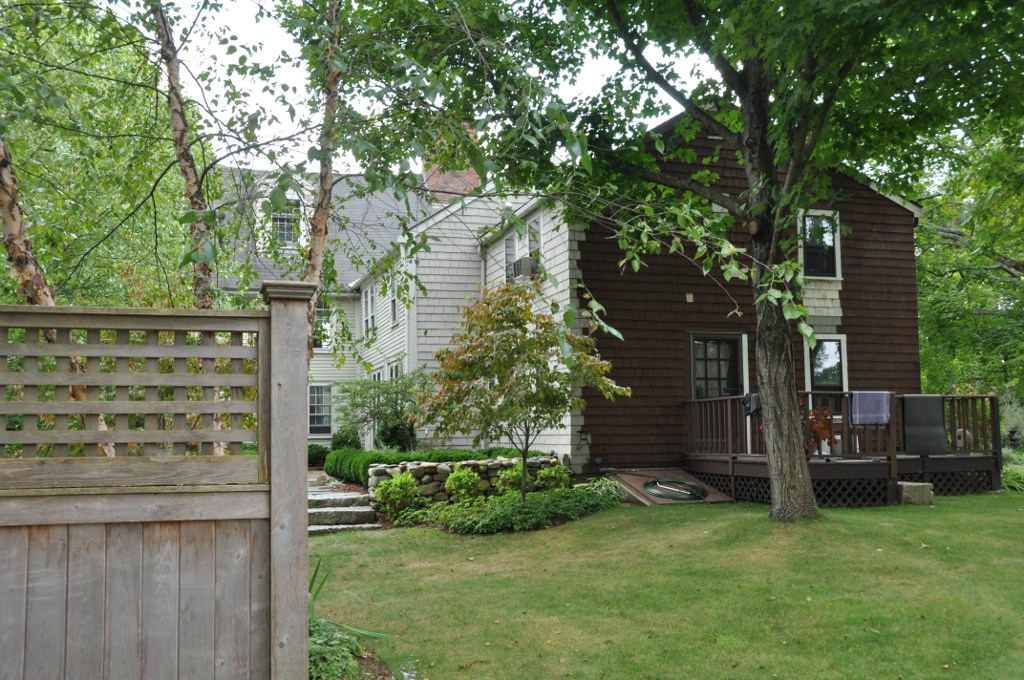

- Location within Massachusetts Location within the United States
- Location: 37 Heartbreak Road, Ipswich, Massachusetts
- Coordinates: 42°39′53″N 70°49′49″W
- Built: 1677
- Architectural style: Colonial Revival, Colonial
- MPS: First Period Buildings of Eastern Massachusetts TR
- NRHP reference No.: 90000236
- Added to NRHP: March 9, 1990

The James Burnham House is a historic First Period house in Ipswich, Massachusetts. Burnham, who was apparently a wealthy man, lived in three different houses in the area from the 1670s to 1703. This is house is believed to be one that he purchased from Samuel Poad in 1677, based on what is known of the various properties and related transactions. The main body of the house exhibits no exposed evidence of its 17th century origins, but analysis of its structure reveals a set of features that make it nearly certain that it was built well before 1700. These diagnostic features include unusually large rooms, of a scale comparable to others in Ipswich, a spacing between joists that is distinctive to pre-1683 Ipswich houses, and a relatively steep roof pitch. Most of these features were covered over by alterations made to the interior during the Federal period, and the building's attic space has been finished over. A two-story ell was added onto the back of the house in the 19th century, and a porch was added in the 20th.

The house was listed on the National Register of Historic Places in 1990.

== See also ==
- Giddings-Burnham House, owned by James Burnham's father Thomas
- National Register of Historic Places listings in Ipswich, Massachusetts
- National Register of Historic Places listings in Essex County, Massachusetts
