= Jordan and Einstein frames =

Field variables

The Lagrangian in scalar-tensor theory can be expressed in the Jordan frame or in the Einstein frame, which are field variables that stress different aspects of the gravitational field equations and the evolution equations of the matter fields. In the Jordan frame the scalar field or some function of it multiplies the Ricci scalar in the Lagrangian and the matter is typically coupled minimally to the metric, whereas in the Einstein frame the Ricci scalar is not multiplied by the scalar field and the matter is coupled non-minimally. As a result, in the Einstein frame the field equations for the space-time metric resemble the Einstein equations but test particles do not move on geodesics of the metric. On the other hand, in the Jordan frame test particles move on geodesics, but the field equations are very different from Einstein equations. The causal structure in both frames is always equivalent and the frames can be transformed into each other as convenient for the given application.

Christopher Hill and Graham Ross have shown that there exist "gravitational contact terms" in the Jordan frame, whereby the action is modified by graviton exchange. This modification leads back to the Einstein frame as the effective theory. Contact interactions arise in Feynman diagrams when a vertex contains a power of the exchanged momentum, $q^2$, which then cancels against the Feynman propagator, $1/q^2$, leading to a point-like interaction. This must be included as part of the effective action of the theory. When the contact term is included results for amplitudes in the Jordan frame will be equivalent to those in the Einstein frame, and results of physical calculations in the Jordan frame that omit the contact terms will generally be incorrect. This implies that the Jordan frame action is misleading, and the Einstein frame is uniquely correct for fully representing the physics.

== Equations and physical interpretation ==
If we perform the Weyl rescaling $\tilde{g}_{\mu\nu}=\Phi^{-2/(d-2)} g_{\mu\nu}$, then the Riemann and Ricci tensors are modified as follows.

$$\sqrt{-\tilde{g}}=\Phi^{-d/(d-2)}\sqrt{-g}$$
$$\tilde{R}=\Phi^{2/(d-2)}\left[ R + \frac{2(d-1)}{d-2}\frac{\Box \Phi}{\Phi} -\frac{3(d-1)}{(d-2)}\left(\frac{\nabla\Phi}{\Phi}\right)^2 \right]$$

As an example consider the transformation of a simple Scalar-tensor action with an arbitrary set of matter fields $\psi_\mathrm{m}$ coupled minimally to the curved background

$$S = \int d^dx \sqrt{-\tilde{g}} \Phi \tilde{R} + S_\mathrm{m}[\tilde{g}_{\mu \nu},\psi_\mathrm{m}] =\int d^dx \sqrt{-g} \left[ R + \frac{2(d-1)}{d-2}\frac{\Box \Phi}{\Phi} - \frac{3(d-1)}{(d-2)}\left( \nabla\left(\ln \Phi \right) \right)^2\right] + S_\mathrm{m}[\Phi^{-2/(d-2)} g_{\mu\nu},\psi_\mathrm{m}]$$

The tilde fields then correspond to quantities in the Jordan frame and the fields without the tilde correspond to fields in the Einstein frame. See that the matter action $S_\mathrm{m}$ changes only in the rescaling of the metric.

The Jordan and Einstein frames are constructed to render certain parts of physical equations simpler which also gives the frames and the fields appearing in them particular physical interpretations. For instance, in the Einstein frame, the equations for the gravitational field will be of the form

$$R_{\mu \nu} - \frac{1}{2} R g_{\mu \nu}= \mathrm{other \; fields}\,.$$

I.e., they can be interpreted as the usual Einstein equations with particular sources on the right-hand side. Similarly, in the Newtonian limit one would recover the Poisson equation for the Newtonian potential with separate source terms.

However, by transforming to the Einstein frame the matter fields are now coupled not only to the background but also to the field $\Phi$ which now acts as an effective potential. Specifically, an isolated test particle will experience a universal four-acceleration

$$a^\mu= \frac{-1}{d-2} \frac{\Phi_{,\nu}}{\Phi}(g^{\mu \nu} + u^\mu u^\nu),$$

where $u^\mu$ is the particle four-velocity. I.e., no particle will be in free-fall in the Einstein frame.

On the other hand, in the Jordan frame, all the matter fields $\psi_\mathrm{m}$ are coupled minimally to $\tilde{g}_{\mu \nu}$ and isolated test particles will move on geodesics with respect to the metric $\tilde{g}_{\mu \nu}$. This means that if we were to reconstruct the Riemann curvature tensor by measurements of geodesic deviation, we would in fact obtain the curvature tensor in the Jordan frame. When, on the other hand, we deduce on the presence of matter sources from gravitational lensing from the usual relativistic theory, we obtain the distribution of the matter sources in the sense of the Einstein frame.

== Models ==
Jordan frame gravity can be used to calculate type IV singular bouncing cosmological evolution, to derive the type IV singularity.

== See also ==
- Albert Einstein
- Pascual Jordan
