= Jackiw–Teitelboim gravity =

Model of gravity with dilation

In theoretical physics, Jackiw–Teitelboim gravity, also known as JT gravity or the R=T model, is a theory of gravity with a dilaton in one spatial and one time dimension (1+1D). It was first formulated by Roman Jackiw and Claudio Teitelboim. The theory is notable for being a toy model of quantum gravity that is exactly solvable, and it has found applications in understanding near-extremal black holes and the AdS/CFT correspondence.

The dynamics of JT gravity in the bulk are relatively simple, leading to a constant negative curvature spacetime (Anti-de Sitter space). However, the theory possesses interesting dynamics on the boundary of this spacetime, which are described by the Schwarzian theory. This boundary theory captures the low-energy behavior of the Sachdev-Ye-Kitaev (SYK) model, a model of quantum chaos.

== Action ==
The action for Jackiw–Teitelboim gravity is defined on a 2-dimensional manifold M with a metric g_{μν} and a dilaton field Φ. It is given by:

$$S_{JT} = \frac{1}{16\pi G_N} \int_M d^2x \sqrt{-g} \Phi (R + 2) + S_{boundary}$$

where G_{N} is the two-dimensional Newton constant, R is the Ricci scalar of the metric g_{μν}, and the cosmological constant is chosen such that the equations of motion fix the spacetime to be constantly curved.

=== Boundary Terms ===
For a manifold M with a boundary ∂M, it is necessary to include boundary terms in the action to have a well-posed variational problem. The appropriate boundary terms for JT gravity are a Gibbons–Hawking–York boundary term (GHY) for the metric and a corresponding term for the dilaton field:

$$S_{boundary} = \frac{1}{8\pi G_N} \int_{\partial M} d t \sqrt{h} (\Phi_b K - \Phi_b)$$

Here, h is the induced metric on the boundary, K is the extrinsic curvature, and Φ_{b} is the value of the dilaton at the boundary. The second term is a counterterm that normalizes the action.

The full action for Jackiw–Teitelboim gravity with boundary is therefore:

$$S = \frac{1}{16\pi G_N} \left[ \int_M d^2x \sqrt{-g} \Phi (R + 2) + 2 \int_{\partial M} d t \sqrt{h} \Phi_b (K - 1) \right]$$

== Schwarzian Boundary Theory ==
A key feature of JT gravity is that its dynamics can be reduced to a theory on the one-dimensional boundary of the two-dimensional spacetime. This is achieved by integrating out the bulk fields (the metric g_{μν} and the dilaton Φ), leaving an effective action for the boundary degrees of freedom. The resulting effective action is the Schwarzian action, which describes the reparametrizations of the boundary.

=== Derivation ===
The derivation of the Schwarzian boundary theory involves several steps:

1. Solving the bulk equations of motion: Variation of the JT action with respect to the dilaton Φ imposes the constraint R = -2, which means the bulk geometry is a slice of Anti-de Sitter space (AdS_{2}). The equation of motion for the metric connects it to the dilaton's stress-energy tensor.
2. Gauge fixing and boundary conditions: A convenient gauge choice is to fix the metric to be of the form $ds^2 = \frac{dz^2 + dt^2}{z^2}$. The boundary of this space is located at z = ε for some small ε. The boundary curve is then parameterized by a time coordinate t(u), where u is a physical time on the boundary.
3. Evaluating the on-shell action: The bulk term of the action vanishes on-shell due to the equation of motion for the dilaton. The entire action is then given by the boundary term, evaluated on the solutions to the equations of motion.
4. The Schwarzian derivative: After carefully evaluating the boundary term with the imposed boundary conditions and gauge fixing, the action reduces to: $S_{eff} = -C \int du \, \left\{ \tan \left( \frac{\pi t(u)}{ \beta} \right), u \right\}$where C is a constant proportional to Φ_{b}/G_{N}, β is the periodicity of the boundary time coordinate, and {f,u} denotes the Schwarzian derivative of a function f with respect to u: $\{f,u\} = \frac{f'''(u)}{f'(u)} - \frac{3}{2}\left(\frac{f''(u)}{f'(u)}\right)^2$

This effective action for the boundary reparametrization t(u) is the renowned Schwarzian action. This theory describes the spontaneous and explicit breaking of conformal symmetry on the boundary, a feature also seen in the low-energy limit of the SYK model.

== See also ==
- Dilaton § The dilaton in quantum gravity
