= Stefan Jackiw =

American violinist

- Born: Stefan Jackiw; 1985 (age 40–41); Boston, Massachusetts, U.S.
- Genre: Classical
- Occupation: Violinist
- Instrument: Violin
- Years active: 1997–present
- Website: www.stefanjackiw.com

Stefan Jackiw (/ˈstɛfɑːn ˈdʒɑːkiːv/; born 1985) is an American classical violinist.

== Biography ==
Stefan Jackiw was born in Boston, Massachusetts. His parents are both prominent physics professors, now retired with emeritus status. His mother, So-Young Pi, was the daughter of Korean poet and essayist Pi Chun-deuk. She was on the faculty at Boston University. His father, Roman Jackiw, was born in Poland to a Ukrainian family. He was on the faculty at MIT.

Jackiw started playing the violin at the age of four when he was given a small instrument that a child of family friends had outgrown. As a child, he took Suzuki method lessons at the Longy School of Music. His teachers include Zinaida Gilels, whom he credits with providing a secure technical foundation, the French violinist Michèle Auclair, with whom he began studying at age 12, and former Cleveland Quartet first violinist Donald Weilerstein.

Unlike many young musicians, who attend schools for the arts or are home-schooled, Jackiw went through the academic school system, graduating from The Roxbury Latin School in West Roxbury. He then attended Harvard University, starting as a psychology major, then switching to a concentration in music. He graduated with a Bachelor of Arts degree in 2007. Also in 2007, he received an Artist Diploma at the New England Conservatory (NEC), which he had been attending concurrently.

Violinists who have especially influenced him include Jascha Heifetz, Fritz Kreisler, Arthur Grumiaux, and Nathan Milstein. But his musical role model is cellist Yo-Yo Ma. In a 2007 interview with The Harvard Crimson, Jackiw said of Ma: "He throws himself into every activity that he's involved in. I've seen him perform countless times and he is always so involved, and gets the audience involved."

After graduation, Jackiw moved to New York City, where he still lives.

== Career ==
Jackiw made his professional debut at 12, when Boston Pops director Keith Lockhart invited him to perform on Opening Night in 1997, playing the Wieniawski Violin Concerto No. 2. Within a year came appearances with the Minnesota Orchestra. In 2000 he made his European debut with the Philharmonia Orchestra in London, conducted by Benjamin Zander. The critically acclaimed performance landed Jackiw's picture on the front page of The Times, while The Strad reported that "a fourteen-year-old violinist took the London music world by storm". In 2001 he performed with the Orchestre Philharmonique de Strasbourg and in recital at the Schleswig-Holstein Music Festival.

More than once, Jackiw has been called upon on short notice to fill in for other noted violinists: in 2002 for Pamela Frank with the Baltimore Symphony, and in 2007 for Janine Jansen in a Boston Symphony Orchestra performance at Tanglewood. The 2002 substitution with the Baltimore Symphony, under Yuri Temirkanov, led to a continuing relationship with that orchestra, which included a tour of Japan in 2002 and a 2003 performance at the Winter Arts Festival in St. Petersburg, Russia.

Among the U.S. orchestras with which he has collaborated are the Chicago Symphony Orchestra (with which he debuted in the 2002 season under Roberto Abbado), the New York Philharmonic, the Cleveland Orchestra, the Kansas City Symphony, the San Francisco Symphony, the Pittsburgh Symphony Orchestra, the Minnesota Orchestra, Florida Orchestra, the Indianapolis, Nashville, Milwaukee, Seattle, and Utah Symphonies, and the Boston Philharmonic Orchestra. Abroad, he has performed with the Seoul Philharmonic, the Tokyo Symphony Orchestra, the Toronto Symphony Orchestra, the Bournemouth Symphony Orchestra, l'Orchestra del Maggio Musicale Fiorentino, the Royal Liverpool Philharmonic, the Ulster Orchestra, the National Symphony Orchestra of Ireland, the Naples Philharmonic Orchestra, and the Asian Youth Orchestra.

Among Jackiw's chamber music and recital activities have been appearances in the Rising Stars Series at the Ravinia and Caramoor Festivals, the Boston Celebrity Series, Rockport Chamber Festival, the Metropolitan Museum of Art's Accolades series, the Louvre Recital Series in Paris, and the Mostly Mozart Festival. He is a regular performer at the Seattle Chamber Music Society's summer and winter festival concerts. He has been a member of the Korean chamber ensemble Ditto and the Tessara Quartet.

In 2011, Jackiw performed the finale of Mendelssohn's violin concerto for the 2011 YouTube Symphony Orchestra "Grande Finale" concert. Since 2020, he has held a master class, "Stefan's Sessions". In 2021, Jackiw joined the faculty of Tonic (formerly the Pocket Conservatory). He has premiered David Fulmer's second violin concerto and Conrad Tao's violin concerto.

== Instruments ==
As of 2025, Jackiw's violin is the 1730 "ex-Rossi" Montagnana. The instrument was purchased from Tarisio by a private foundation for Jackiw's use. He also owns a 1704 Vincenzo Rugeri violin, and previously played on a 1750 Guadagnini violin loaned to him by the Avery Fisher Career Grant.

Jackiw also owns a bow made by François Nicolas Voirin in the mid-19th century. While giving the UK premiere of Reinhold Glière's violin concerto with the Bournemouth Symphony Orchestra on May 10, 2023, his bow broke; Jackiw continued playing using the concertmaster's bow, and the Voirin was later mended.

== Honors ==
Jackiw has received a number of honors, including:

- Avery Fisher Career Grant (2002)
- Louis Sudler Prize in the Arts
- Best debut of the year, 2004–2005 season, Seattle Times and Seattle Post-Intelligencer
- One of the top two solo appearances of the year, Boston Globe (2002)

== Discography ==
- Brahms - Complete Sonatas for Violin and Piano with Max Levinson (Sony Classical, 2009)
- Beethoven - Triple Concerto in C major, Op. 56, with Inon Barnatan (piano), Alisa Weilerstein (cello), the Academy of St Martin in the Fields conducted by Alan Gilbert (Pentatone, 2019)
- Paganini - Violin Concerto, No. 1, Op. 6 (1st movement), Méditation from Thaïs with the New England Conservatory Youth Philharmonic Orchestra conducted by Benjamin Zander (CPI Records, 2001)
