= Astor Historic District =

Historic district in Wisconsin, United States

- U.S. National Register of Historic Places
- U.S. Historic district
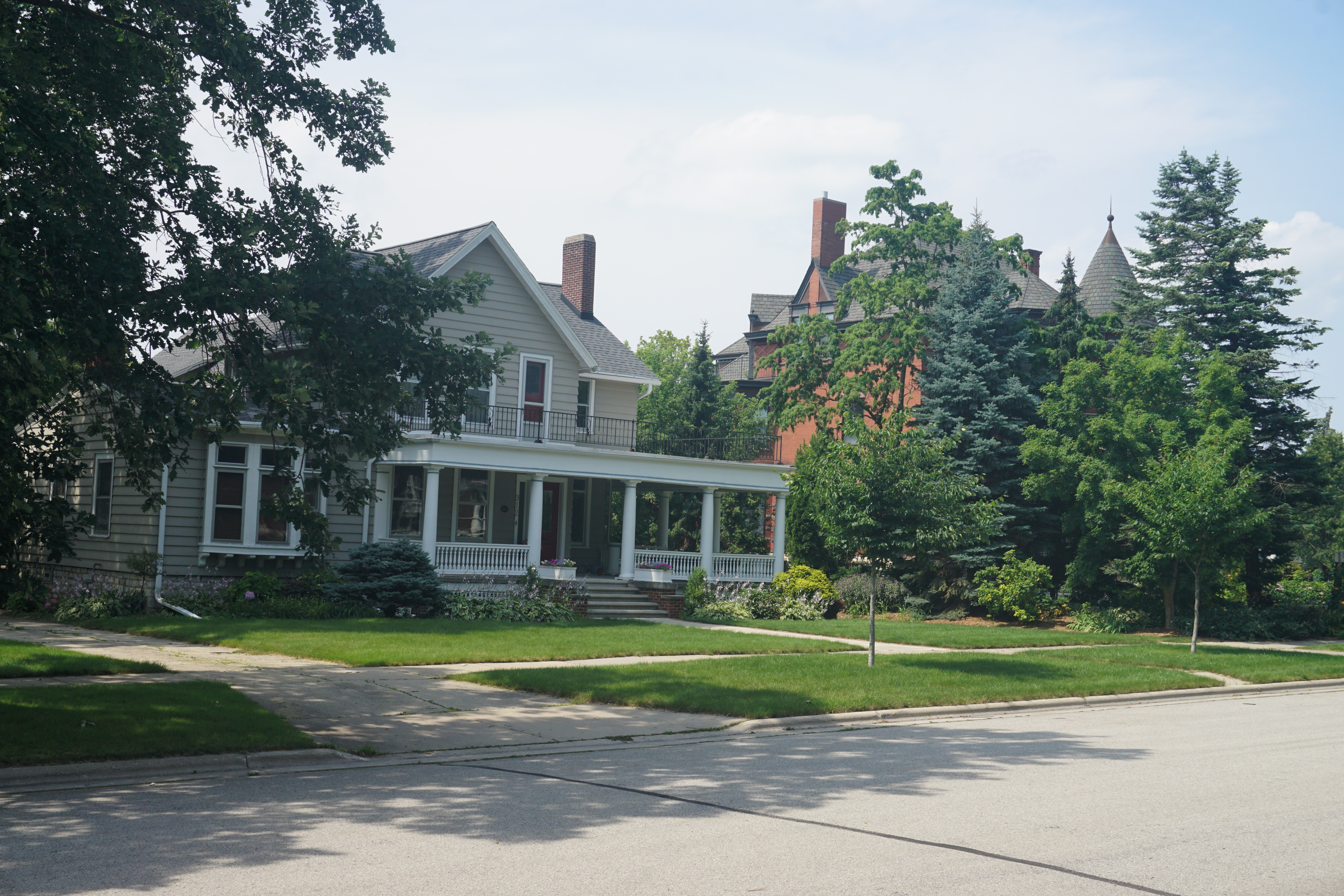
- Astor Historic District, Green Bay, Wisconsin

- Location within Wisconsin Location within the United States
- Location: Green Bay, Wisconsin
- Area: 153.5 acres (62.1 ha)
- Built: 1835
- NRHP reference No.: 80000107
- Added to NRHP: February 27, 1980

The Astor Historic District is a residential neighborhood located in Green Bay, Wisconsin. It was added to the Wisconsin State Register of Historic Places in 1975, and the National Register of Historic Places in 1980. The Astor Historic District is significant as the highest concentration of residences of the economic and civic leaders of Green Bay from its period of settlement well into the twentieth century. The neighborhoods's history, spanning nearly a century and a half, is reflected in the buildings and architectural styles of the district. The prosperity and influence of Astor is reflected in the scale and stylishness of its homes, particularly those from its period of greatest prosperity, 1895–1929.

== Description ==
The Astor Historic District is an approximately 39 square block area of the southeast section of Green Bay, Wisconsin. The area is part of the plat of Astor as surveyed by A.G. Ellis, District Surveyor of the County of Brown in 1835. The district is a configuration of straight and intersecting streets unaltered from the original plat of 1835. The district is bounded by E. Mason Street (northerly), Webster Avenue (easterly), Grignon Street (southerly), and the Fox River (westerly).

== History ==
The Astor Historic District is made up of what was once the Town of Astor. It was named for John Jacob Astor and platted by men with interests in Astor's American Fur Company. In 1838, the Town of Astor and the Town of Navarino merged to form what is now the City of Green Bay. The area the district encompasses was historically referred to as "The Hill" - the first such reference being the plat map of A.G. Ellis dated 1835. This hill is the dominant natural feature in the area, where the ridge of the hill runs parallel to the Fox River, and shaped development of Astor from the very beginning of settlement in the area. It provides natural drainage on its western slope, water running off quickly into the Fox River. The high and dry nature of the Astor area attracted early settlement of the La Baye area away from the swampy land to the north in what was, in 1829, to become the town of Navarino.

The oldest structures in the district are located along the riverfront and on the blocks centered around the intersections of Adams Street and Jefferson Street with Porlier Street. At the intersection of Adams Street and Porlier Street was the site of John Lawe's trading post, established in 1792 by his brother, Jacob Franks. Farther south along the riverfront near the southern boundary of the district is the site of two Native American cemeteries and mounds, but remains of the mounds have been lost due to the residential and railroad development of the area.

The burial mounds and settlers cabins along the riverfront gave way to the many homes that remain today, mostly from the heyday of Green Bay history during the period 1895 to 1915. During this period, Green Bay benefited greatly from its location at the mouth of the Fox River and became the center of economic activity for northern Wisconsin and the Fox River Valley. Expansion of transportation facilities and the growth of the lumber industry to the north brought opportunity and success to the families who built the Astor neighborhood. Commerce increased and with it the settlement of the Astor area. The tenor and qualities in terms of construction and design found in the homes of Frank Emery Murphy,(1862 – 1934) also lumberman, and four terms alderman of Green Bay WI, Mitchell Joannes, Patrick H. Martin, Rufus B. Kellogg, William B. Kellogg, George Greene, John Minahan, Arthur C. Neville, and others set the scope for the very distinctive qualities that set Astor apart from the remainder of the Green Bay community.

== Architecture ==
The Astor Historic District contains fine examples of the architectural styles spanning the period, 1835 to 1920. The architectural styles reflect three periods in the development of Green Bay: the period of early settlement; the preliminary growth from the 1840s to the 1880s when the community became established; and the boom years, which established the economic base for the Green Bay of the present - the period from the 1890s to 1920s. Included within the district are the remains of early settlers log cabins from the early and mid-1800s, as well as Greek Revival, Gothic Revival, Italianate, Queen Anne, and Shingle styles of the later 19th century. The eclectic revivals, châteauesque, and Prairie School styles are representative of the early twentieth century homes in the district.
