= Harvey Clapp =

American politician

Harvey Spaulding Clapp (March 13, 1817 – 1889) was an American farmer and legislator.

Born in Moretown, Vermont, Clapp moved to Wisconsin Territory in 1836 and settled in Hudson and was a farmer. He served as County Clerk of St. Croix County, Wisconsin and was a Republican. In 1874, Clapp served in the Wisconsin State Assembly. He died in New Richmond, Wisconsin.
