= Wendell Abraham Anderson =

American physician

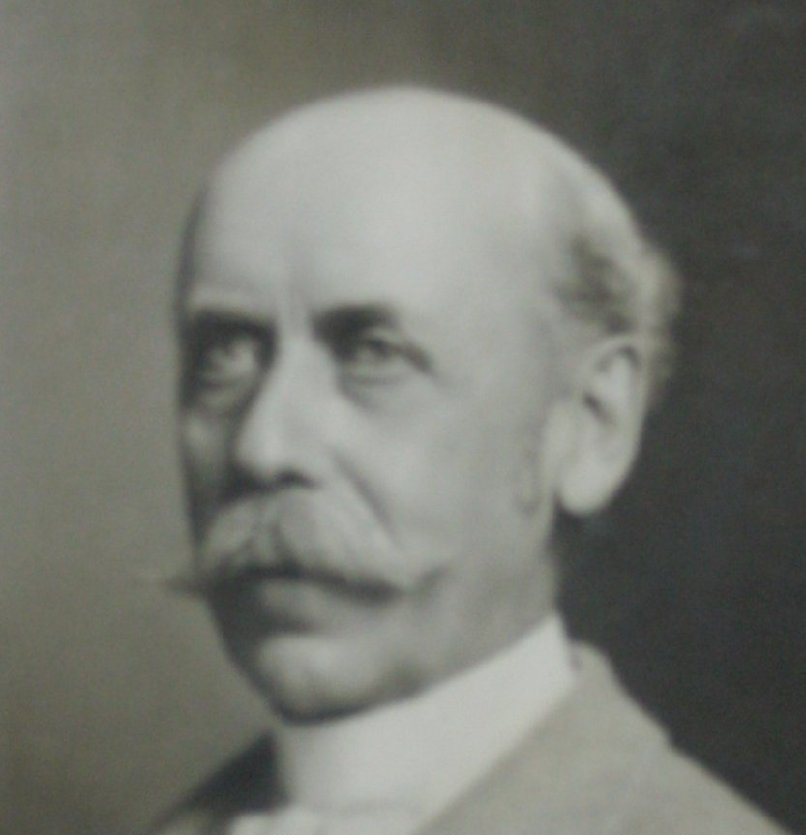
Wendell Abraham Anderson

Wendell Abraham Anderson (1840–1929), was chairman of the Democratic Party of Wisconsin in the late nineteenth century.

Anderson was born in Gray, Maine in 1840, attended the Gorham Academy in Gorham, Maine, Bowdoin College, and the Columbia University College of Physicians and Surgeons. During the American Civil War, Anderson served with the Union Army. In 1866, Anderson moved to La Crosse, Wisconsin, and died in 1929.

== Political career ==
Anderson served as city physician of La Crosse from 1870 to 1875, and from 1877 to 1881. Anderson was also twice a member of the board of education of La Crosse, from 1873 to 1876 and from 1880 to 1881. He then served as chairman of the Democratic Party of Wisconsin, from 1875 to 1876 and from 1881 to 1885. In 1881, Anderson ran for Lieutenant Governor of Wisconsin on the gubernatorial ticket with N. D. Fratt. They lost to future U.S. Secretary of Agriculture Jeremiah McLain Rusk and Sam Fifield. Anderson was then mayor of La Crosse, from 1899 to 1901 and again from 1907 to 1909. In his final public office, Anderson was appointed U.S. Consul General in Montreal, Quebec by President Grover Cleveland. Once more, Anderson served in this post twice: from 1885 to 1889 and from 1893 to 1897.
