= George Giddings House and Barn =

Historic house in Massachusetts, United States

- U.S. National Register of Historic Places
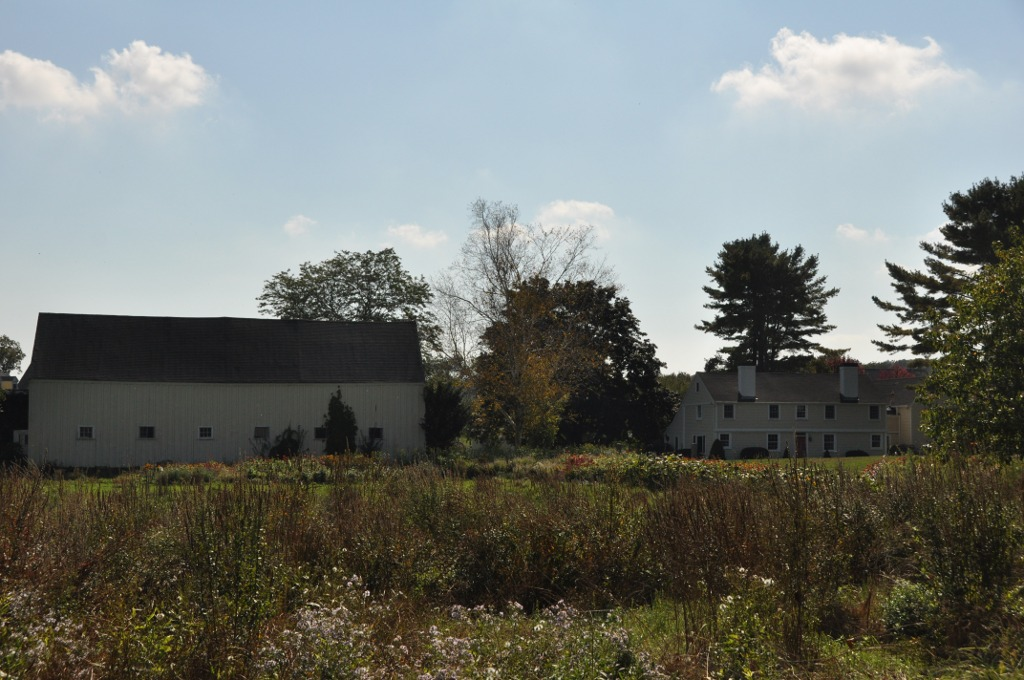

- Location within Massachusetts Location within the United States
- Location: 66 Choate Street, Essex, Massachusetts
- Coordinates: 42°38′47″N 70°48′24″W
- Built: 1690
- Architectural style: Colonial
- MPS: First Period Buildings of Eastern Massachusetts TR
- NRHP reference No.: 90000206
- Added to NRHP: March 9, 1990

The George Giddings House and Barn is a historic First Period farm in Essex, Massachusetts. Both the house and the barn are estimated to have been built in the 1690s, and contain construction details unique in Essex County First Period buildings. The house was originally built as a single two story cell structure with a large chimney on one side, which was then widened with the addition of a second cell on the other side of the chimney. In the 19th century a number of alterations were made: the central chimney was removed, the entry of the house was reoriented from south to north by the addition of a new central door on the north face, and two new chimneys were added along the north elevation. The house has modern additions to the rear (south) side. The barn is of a similar vintage to the house, although it started with only five windows, and was extended at some point by the addition to the east of a sixth bay. It is one of a very few surviving First Period barns.

The property was listed on the National Register of Historic Places in 1990.

== See also ==
- National Register of Historic Places listings in Essex County, Massachusetts
