= Steven Giddings =

Steven B. Giddings is an American physicist and is a professor at the University of California, Santa Barbara.

Giddings earned a bachelor's degree from the University of Utah and a doctorate from Princeton University. He was elected a fellow of the American Physical Society in 2012, "[f]or his wide ranging contributions to gravitational physics at its intersection with elementary particle physics, especially his work on the quantum properties of black holes in the universe and in accelerators".
