= First Period houses in Massachusetts (1660–1679) =

List of old houses in Massachusetts

This article attempts to list the oldest houses built in the Commonwealth of Massachusetts, United States, from 1660 to 1679. These are known as First Period houses of the early to mid–second generation as they were built by the children of the first settlers in the Massachusetts Bay colony. During this time, buildings in New England were increasingly designed and built by regionally trained carpenters and were only occasionally influenced by new immigrant craftsmen. These structures have highly decorated wooden frames and are structurally more complex than the previous surviving generation of houses. While many existing homes are thought to have been built between 1660 and 1679, scientifically proving their age is another matter. Of the 78 houses on this list, just 11 have been proven through dendrochronology. The rest of the examples are approximate (indicated with a "circa" or "c.") and based on architectural studies and historical records. Only First-period houses built before 1679 by the second generation are suitable for inclusion on this list.

All entries should include citations concerning 17th-century architectural features, a report by an architectural historian, or dendrochronology whenever possible. The houses on this list are limited to extant structures preferably with remaining 17th-century architecture. Any given house may or may not have been moved over time from its original foundation.

== Legend ==
Verified date using dendrochronology or some other type of architectural survey.
Estimated date.
House has been heavily modified per references used.

== 1660–1669 ==
Name	Image	Location	First Built	Short summary
Abraham Jewett House	N/A	Rowley	c.1660	Abraham Jewett is thought to have purchased a lot where he built this house around 1660. Jewett's History reads that the residence has since been altered so many times that it is "difficult to determine the original structure". According to the MHC, elements from the 17th century still exist in the oldest part of the house which is visible nearest to Prospect Street. Major alterations made since then include two front bow windows, and additions to the side and rear of the main house which are all largely confined to the mid- to late 20th century. These changes were made as the residence became a restaurant, now known locally as Stephanie's Village Pancake House.
Dillingham House		Brewster	c.1660	According to the NRHP, this house is said to have been constructed by John Dillingham no later than 1660. Very little alterations are present on the exterior of the house, except for when it was restored in 1915–18. This house was originally built as a full saltbox, and enlarged during restorations in 1915. These additions include a shed dormer, two more bedrooms and a bathroom on the second floor, and an enclosed sleeping porch. In the interior of the home, features such as 18th-century paneling and molding along with original 17th-century summer beams still remain. The house has since been modernized to include heat, electricity and plumbing.
Edward Harraden House		Gloucester	c.1660	This residence was built on land purchased by Edward Harraden in 1656, who is presumed to have built the house not long afterward. The core of the Edward Harraden House is thought to date to the 17th century, which includes attic and summer beams. Over time the single cell structure was expanded before 1765, with an early 19th-century frontispiece added later on.
Capt. John Gorham House	N/A	Barnstable	c.1660	John Gorham allegedly inherited this house from his father at an unknown date. It was described in 1686 as being the "most easterly" residence in Barnstable. Remodeling and enlargement of the residence began in 1745, and the house was later used by Miss Abigail Gorham (c. 1850) as a private school for girls. The home is now a private residence that mostly contains 18th-century architecture.
Kings Highway Inn	—N/a	Pembroke	c.1660	The Kings Highway Inn dates to at least c. 1660 based on a horseshoe plate found in the central chimney. It was operated as a tavern starting in 1713, and was later used for shoe manufacturing in 1867. During this time a large two-story addition was added to the back of the saltbox structure. The building later served as a restaurant, and is now a private residence.
Norton-Webb House	—N/a	Oak Bluffs	c.1660	This house is traditionally dated to c. 1660 based on a brick found in the chimney with said date. The residence was later moved several times in 1710 before resting in its current spot. At some point before 1800, a second wing with a shorter ell was attached to the original structure. Isaac Norton is the oldest known owner, who in 1786 deeded it to his son. Generations of the Norton family lived in the residence until at least c. 1978, when it was last recorded that a decedent named Harold Webb occupied the residence.
Rev. Samuel Willard Garrison House	—N/a	Groton	c.1660	Samuel Willard is thought to have built this house as a garrison sometime in 1660. Historian Abbott Lowell Cummings noted that the residence suggested use as a garrison based on evidence of past window framing locations. The current outward appearance of the house dates to c. 1829 as the roof was rebuilt c. 1770, and the windows replaced c. 19th century.
Waldo-Caldwell House	—N/a	Ipswich	c.1660	John Caldwell bought a house with land from Cornelious Waldo in 1654. The original structure was taken down in favor of the current structure that dates to c. 1660. This latter house was built from the first as a two-over-two room central chimney plan structure. At some point at a later date a lean-to was added which has since been replaced. The "fine sheathing" in the chambers, the front stairs, and the current chimney all date to the early 18th century. Restorations to the house were later done in 1956.
James Blake House		Dorchester	1661	The James Blake House is the oldest verified house in Boston as determined by a dendrochronology study conducted in 2007. This structure is noteworthy as it contains West England country framing which is rarely seen in the United States. In 1895, the James Blake House was moved to its present location as the city needed to make room for avenue widening. The house retains the same "probable appearance" exterior as built minus two gables that were present at the front end.
Riggs House	—N/a	Gloucester	c.1661	Thomas Riggs built the gable-roofed portion of this house sometime in 1661. His grandson George (Riggs) later added the gambrel-roofed part in 1700 which created a central chimney. Since then, all of the windows and exterior doors have been replaced over time. The dormers and second chimney between the two house parts date to the 20th century.
John Bent House	—N/a	Framingham	c.1662	The John Bent House is also known as the Albert Gibbs House, and is thought to date to around 1662. In its current form the house is an 18th-century structure around this alleged earlier 17th-century core. One of John's descendants moved the house (c. 1735) a short distance to where it stands now. Later occupants which include the Gibbs family extensively renovated the interior in the 1850s.
Ambrose Gale House	—N/a	Marblehead	c.1663	This house was built for fisherman Ambrose Gale in 1663 with initial construction taking place on the left half of the building. The chimney stacks in the ends of the house have been noted as "probably in their original locations" with the steeply pitched roof dating before 1700. Around c. 1840 the house received extensive remodeling which included the windows, exterior and interior window trim, the stairway and the fireplaces. This remodeled Greek Revival style trim house is now a private residence.
Peregrine White House	—N/a	Braintree	c.1663	Not much is known about Peregrine White's house other than the earliest part which is thought to date to around 1663. The house was originally built in Marshfield before being moved to its present location in 1947.
Col. John Thatcher House		Yarmouth	c.1664	Anthony Thacher built this house sometime in 1664 for his son John and his new wife. In 1680 the original house was moved to its present site giving its alternate name 1680 House. The original portion of the house consisted of only the eastern section, as the family grew a western wing was later added on. Generations of the Thatcher family lived in the house until the 1970s when it was given to S.P.N.E.A. (now Historic New England).
Norwood-Hyatt House		Gloucester	c.1664	The oldest portion of this house is estimated to have been built in 1664 for Francis Norwood, a mariner and early settler of Gloucester. It remained in the Norwood family and their descendants until 1879. Afterwards, the house was acquired that year by Audella Hyatt, wife of zoologist and palaeontologist Alpheus Hyatt. It was owned by descendants of the Hyatts until 1987. While the original portion of the house may date to the 17th century, most of the current structure suggests it was constructed after 1720.
Pickering House		Salem	1664	The Pickering House is located at 18 Broad Street in the Chestnut Street District, and has been owned by the same family since it was built. Results from a dendrochronology study conducted in 2007 show that the oldest parts of the house date to the winter of 1663–4. The extended parlour portion of the house was completed roughly 19 years later. Most of the home's exterior was reworked in 1841 with Gothic Revival style features. The interior of the house has since been restored to its colonial appearance.
David Stone House	N/A	Lincoln	c.1665	This house is traditionally dated to around 1665 when Gregory Stone gave the house to his son David. It was later impacted in a large way in 1959, when much of the house was rebuilt after a fire tore through the structure. Evidence suggests though, that 17th-century remains are still incorporated within the eighteenth-century version of the home. This includes heavy framing timbers, old hardware, and paneling. At some point in time the saltbox style roof was slightly raised in the rear.
Gedney House		Salem	1665	Shipwright Eleazer Gedney acquired the land for a house on April 20, 1664, which was confirmed by dendrochronology in 2002. While the oldest timbers date to 1664–65, the house has since been modified to its present form. The south end lean-to (later replaced by 1800) was raised to accompany two stories in 1706, and the end wall facing the street was given a framed overhang. A complete gutting of the interior for conversion into apartments occurred before SPNEA acquired the property in 1967.
John Hiram Perkins House		Lynnfield	c.1665	Also known as the Hart House. While this house was given to John Hiram Perkins in 1694, others lived in the residence as early as the 1660s. Much of the original house remains such as the six fireplaces in a central chimney, paneling, and floor boards. The double walls present in the house were built after 1700, and all of the windows have since been replaced. An original unique double paned window has since been removed from the home and now resides in the Historic New England museum.
Nathaniel Rust Mansion		Ipswich	c.1665	This house was conveyed to Nathaniel Rust on June 2, 1665, and has since been altered beyond recognition. At some point in time c. 1815 Federal architecture was incorporated into the residence. The mansion was later moved to its present location in 1837. Colonial period features still found at the residence include the 5 bay second floor, as well as two "diminutive" parallel summer beams in the oldest portion of the house.
Porter Bradstreet House	—N/a	Danvers	c.1665	Joseph Porter traditionally erected this house sometime in 1665 on land given to by his father as a marriage portion. The namesake "Bradstreet" comes from Captain Ludley Bradstreet, a decedent in-law of the Porters who died in 1833. At some point in the 19th century a one-story surround porch was added to the residence, and the windows were replaced. In the early 1980s a private school was established which added several buildings to the property. For a time the house was endangered after the school moved, but new owners bought it as a private residence.
Arthur Howland House	—N/a	Marshfield	c.1666	Arthur Howland (brother of John Howland) built his house in Marshfield sometime in 1666. The former of these two brothers was known to be a Quaker who conducted services inside his home. Howland died in 1675 and the house passed through his descendants until 1736. It is not known what original 17th-century elements remain in the now private residence. The dormer at the rear ell, the one-story addition joining barn, and 2-story rear ell were all added in the 20th century.
Jabez Howland House		Plymouth	c.1667	This two-story wood-frame house was originally built by Jacob Mitchell sometime in 1667. It was subsequently purchased by Jabez Howland, who was the son of John Howland. The oldest remaining portion is the single cell two-story southeast corner of house, with chimney on the west wall. The portion left of the present day entrance was added c. 1750 when the lean-to in the back was raised. Restorations to the house were started in 1912, and were completed in 1941 to give its original appearance.
Stephen Daniels House		Salem	c.1667	This house was either built for, or built by shipbuilder Stephen Daniels sometime in 1667. It was later expanded into its current Georgian configuration in 1756 by Samuel Silsbee, who was Daniel's great-grandson. The oldest remaining portion of the house is the lower-two stories of the southern half. Other names for the residence include The Daniels House and The Daniels House Bed and Breakfast as the residence is currently operated as an inn.
House of the Seven Gables		Salem	1668	The House of the Seven Gables is a National Historic Landmark. Dendrochronology studies done in 2005 dated the oldest portions of the house to roughly 1668. Later additions to the house include a lean-to and kitchen ell at the back of the house by 1693. Georgian woodwork altered the parlor wing of the original house in 1723. The back part of the original structure was removed in 1794, and in the nineteenth century the decorative gables met the same fate as they were too old fashioned. These were restored along with the original 17th-century appearance sometime in the early 20th century.
Joseph Wilcomb House	—N/a	Ipswich	c.1668	Tailor John Edwards built this house sometime in 1668, and his descendants lived in it until at least the mid-18th century. The namesake of the house comes from Captain Joseph Willcomb, who bought the house in prior to 1762. His descendants owned the house for more than 150 years before more modern independent ownership. The house was originally one room deep with a lower roof which was expanded at an unknown date. A partial restoration effort was made to the house in 1953.
Josiah Standish House	—N/a	West Tisbury	c.1668	Josiah Standish built this house sometime in 1668 and owned it for about twenty years. The house passed into the "Cottle" family who owned it until 1760, when it was sold to Captain Samuel Cobb. Over the next 85 years the house was purchased in turn by the town of West Tisbury for use as a parsonage. This idea was later abandoned, and the house passed into the Whiting family from 1845 to 2013. Despite numerous modifications over the years, the house has retained many late 17th-century or early 18th-century construction details.

== 1670–1679 ==
Name	Image	Location	First Built	Short summary
Ingersoll's Ordinary	—N/a	Danvers	c.1670	Ingersoll's Ordinary aka the Ingersoll House was built by deacon Nathaniel Ingersoll sometime in 1670 as an ordinary (tavern). The residence is best known for the role it played during the Salem witch trials, as the accused were exterminated here by Magistrate Jonathan Corwin and John Hathorne. Ingersoll owned the residence until his death in 1719. Extensive repairs which included modernization were made on the house in 1753, and it continued to be operated as a tavern into the 1800s. It was later purchased for a parsonage in 1832, and remained owned by the First Church of Danvers until 1968. Ingersoll's Ordinary is now privately owned with its earliest sections still intact.
John Kendrick House	—N/a	Ipswich	c.1670	It is thought that John Kendrick built this house sometime in 1670 based on surviving stylistic evidence. Features on the exterior of the house largely date to a later time period, though many 17th-century elements remain within. These include "rare fragments of a three part casement window frame in the southern gable", original rear rafters in the roof, and remnants in the chimney stack of a pilaster. 18th-century interior elements are found in the main rooms of the lean-to, and include corner fireplaces with "fine mid-century woodwork", and an "excellent" corner cupboard.
Judge Samuel Holten House		Danvers	c.1670	This house is estimated to have been built sometime in 1670 by Benjamin Houlton whose family had connections to the Salem witch trials. The residence gets its name from one of his decedents, Samuel Holten who served in the Continental Congress. Architecturally, the house largely dates from the 18th century with numerous additions added over time which include casement sash windows and a seven-seat privy. Remaining 17th-century features are present in the attic with the original framing.
Swett-Ilsley House		Newbury	c.1670	Stephen Swett allegedly built this house in 1670 under the name "Blue Anchor Tavern". The structure which consisted of a "typical' 17th-century single-room with a chimney bay end remained unaltered until 1720. During this latter time the roof was re-orientated, and a second single-room unit was added to the northern part of the original block. Further additions were added c. 1740, and c. 1755 which further expanded the house to the north. The original chimney was demolished and a new chimney was added to serve the first two sections of the current four blocked house.
Thomas Wheeler House	—N/a	Concord	c.1670	The lean-to portion of this house is thought to have been built by Thomas Wheeler sometime in 1670. While the structure still contains within a small seventeenth-century house, much of the current construction dates to the 1880s. This transitional Queen Anne style update was constructed by architect John Chapman. At some point a Victorian era veranda was also added on which was removed from the facade sometime after 1937.
Zaccheus Gould House		Topsfield	c.1670	It is assumed that this house was built for Zaccheus Gould sometime in 1670 as a single cell block. It was later enlarged to a double cell block c. 1700, as the left side portion was added on to the original. An ell in the rear, and three dormer windows in the front were later additions done in the 20th century. There is ample evidence of First Period features which include original summer beams and original framing. The roof of the house contains old and new portions as indicated by doubled rafters at the junctions.
Chaplin-Clarke House		Rowley	c.1671	According to the NRHP nomination form, this residence is believed to sit on the foundation of an earlier structure built by Hugh Chaplin in 1643. Joseph Chaplin (Hugh's son) allegedly built a one-room deep house in 1671 when he married. The lean-to portion is a later addition which was added c. 1700 giving the house its present form. As a whole, the house is described in the NRHP form as "an unusual and well preserved example of seventeenth century construction." The "Clarke" namesake is from a Richard Clarke, who acquired the property in the early 18th century. It is now a private residence.
Joseph Houlton House	—N/a	Danvers	c.1671	This house is most notable for being built by Joseph Houlton sometime in 1671. Houlton, his wife Sarah, and his son Joseph Houlton Jr. all supported their neighbor Rebecca Nurse in 1692, defending her against accusations of witchcraft. The house at one point used to have a lean-to, and has since been altered from its original form. Not much architecturally is known about the residence other than these two things.
Dr. John Calef House		Ipswich	c.1671	Deacon Thomas Knowlton built a 2 1/2-story end-gable house with central chimney on South Main street c. 1671. The house still retains its 17th-century core with original frame, but was altered on the exterior c. 1775. These alterations gave the residence "high-quality" Georgian styling which includes carved modillions. During this time the home was owned by a Tory named John Calef, who appears in Paul Revere's broadside "A warm place: hell". The residence was later moved to its present location in 1777 by the subsequent owner.
John Peach Jr. House	N/A	Marblehead	c.1671	While this house may be older than attested, the earliest southwestern portion is thought to have been in place by 1671. The house was originally built by John Peach Jr. who was a large landowner at the time. It was later "greatly altered" in the 1880s and 1920s, but still retains original roughly hewn beams, and a center stairway. The fireplaces inside the house have also been described as "old" but have since been moved with their chimneys.
Merchant-Choate House		Ipswich	1671	This 17th-century home is also known as the "Tuttle House". Dendrochronological dating shows the earliest portions of the house were completed sometime in 1671 with later additions. The house was extended to the north a year later, and repairs were done to this extension after 1761. Physical evidence shows that two single-cell 1 1/2-story cottages were put together around a central chimney possibly as late as 1705. These structures were later raised to two stories; a lean-to and rear lateral extensions were likely added on during the 18th century.
Michael Bacon (III) House	—N/a	Bedford	c.1671	According to records from Cambridge, Michael Bacon III is said to have built this house c.1671. The eastern front portion of the current structure which includes two original east rooms with the central chimney is described as "distinctly older" than the western front portion. The former of these could date as early as c.1642 while the latter could have been built by c.1712. Rooms on both floors were added to the rear of the house towards the mid- to late 18th century. In May 2022 it was announced that the house would be restored and preserved as part of a development plan.
Richard Temple-Stone-Munroe House	—N/a	Concord	c.1671	The oldest part of this house is believed to have been built by Richard Temple in 1671. Later owners included Capt. John Stone, who designed the original Charles River Bridge in the late 18th century, and pencil maker William Munroe (Note: non consecutively) from 1807 to 1844. The exterior of the house now dates to the mid-eighteenth century through modifications, while 17th-century features such as a "gunstock" post remain enclosed within the now enlarged structure.
Hannah Devereux Knott House	N/A	Marblehead	c.1672	There are two people which could have built this house sometime in 1672, both of which were husbands of Hannah Knott. As built, the house was a 2.5 story 1/2 house with a low pitched roof. It was 'vastly" altered in 1946 when the residence was expanded 8 feet to the rear which changed the slopes of the roof. The remains of the original house include the original beam structure with lamb's tongue stops. It is suspected that the present chimney/fireplaces are more recent as there are no indications of original placements.
Vincent House	—N/a	Edgartown	c.1672	William Vincent constructed this house as a full cape no later than 1672 to go along with his farm. It was later altered into a one-room federal style house sometime around 1790, and was continuously owned by the Vincent family until 1940. The house was acquired by the Martha's Vineyard Historical Preservation 5ociety in September 1977, when it was moved to its present location. Original features such as an exposed frame in the South-East parlor remain intact. This home is now operated as a museum during the summer months.
Chandler-Bigsby-Abbot House		Andover	c.1673	This house was originally built with four-rooms sometime before 1673 by Captain Thomas Chandler. Additions to the house which include a leanto, and ell were later added in the 18th century when the house received a Georgian renovation. The Andover Historical Commission notes that "The interior rooms on the south facing side on both levels contain huge hand hewn summer beams with chamfered edges and gun-stock post corner beams." Also mentioned is how the original chimney was removed and later replaced in the 20th century.
Isaac Robinson House	—N/a	West Tisbury	c.1673	Settler Isaac Robinson is believed to have built this house sometime in 1673 as 1/2 a cape. It was later enlarged into a full cape after 1733 by subsequent owners, and further altered by an ell which dates to the 19th century. The original rafters and collars were cut and numbered with Roman numerals before they were put into position so that the tenons and mortises fit properly. This house is also notable for having evidence of a rare wattle and daub construction. The original rafters and collars can still be seen in the present structure.
Israel Fearing House	—N/a	Hingham	c.1673	Cooper Israel Fearing is believed to have built this house sometime around 1673. Physical evidence appears to show that the original structure was a two-story single cell house, which now remains as the southwest section of the current dwelling. The rest of the residence largely dates to the mid-1700s when an east, and a rear pile of west section of the house were constructed. It was reported in January 1997 by the Boston University Preservation Studies that the residence still continues to be used as a single family dwelling.
Jerathmell Bowers House		Lowell	c.1673	Jerathmell Bowers was the stepson of an early settler named Henry Bowtell, whom had been granted a plot of land. The house is thought to date sometime around 1673 with elements from the 17th to 20th century. These elements include the northwest kitchen ell, a milking shed, and a sunroom. Major interior modernization was also undertaken c.1914. The northwest room of the house still contains many of the original 17th-century features.
Timothy Williamson Tavern-Proctor Bourne Store	N/A	Marshfield	c.1673	Freeman Timothy Williamson owned the original part of this building by 1673 when it was licensed as an ordinary (tavern). It was later purchased by merchant Proctor Bourne, who enlarged the existing structure in 1709 for use as a general store and post office. The present building now consists of three first floor commercial spaces that were subdivided between 1898 and 1933. Very little remains of the original 17th-century structure which is believed to be hidden "amidst numerous and drastic alterations".
Joseph Peaslee (Garrison) House	—N/a	Haverhill	c.1674	From a traditional narrative, Dr. Joseph Peasle built this house sometime around 1673 using bricks he brought over from England. According to the Haverhill Historical Commission however, the house may date to the following year based on an assessment done in 1972. Not much architecturally is known about the residence other than the report calling it an "excellent example of a 17th century house".
Matthew Pratt II House	—N/a	Weymouth	c.1674	According to historical records and Weymouth historians, this house was either first owned by Samuel or Matthew Pratt sometime around 1674. In either case, the residence remained in the "Pratt" family until 1902. The house remains largely as built with decorative elements such as the corner boards, short gable returns and molded cornice. Its large center brick chimney and low first-floor post height mark it as a First Period house. The only major alteration includes an enclosed porch which was added to the residence in the 20th century.
Morse-Barber House		Sherborn	c.1674	Joseph Morse possibly built the core of this house with his wife sometime around 1674. The residence served as Sherborn's first meetinghouse until a formal church was built in the 1680s. Afterwards, the house fell into the ownership of the Barber family by 1753 and remained under their ownership until the late 19th century. Under their care the house was enlarged in 1814, and was remodeled in Greek Revival-style surface treatments ca.1835. According to the Massachusetts Historical Commission, the home still retains some First Period elements.
Nicholas Eldredge House	—N/a	Chatham	c.1674	This house goes back to at least 1674 when John Downing purchased the land from an unknown individual. It was later purchased c.1696 by a descendant (Nicholas Eldredge) of the founding settler of Chatham. His descendants subsequently added onto the house c.1820, and it remained in the Eldredge family until 1923. From c.1945 the house also operated as several small businesses which include (in chronological order): "The White Rabbit", "Unnamed potters shop", "Chatham Antiques", and most recently a place selling antique maps.
Stetson–Ford House		Norwell	c.1674	While shipbuilder Thomas Stetson built this house sometime around 1674, it was later rebuilt and enlarged by shipbuilder Michael Ford c.1785. The interior largely features transitional late-Georgian/early Federal style designs including the woodwork. Evidence of First Period construction include chamfered posts and beams which remain exposed in the northeast ell and in both stories of the main house. The exposed structure of the south part of the ell still supports the long-held belief that this part of the building dates to before 1725.
Bennett House	—N/a	Manchester	c.1675	This residence could have been built by William Bennett before 1675. In the NRHP nomination, The Massachusetts Historical Commission notes that it was possibly intended for Aaron Bennett. Not much more is said about the residence other than it retains its First Period identity through the surviving western half of the structure.
Concord Old Block House		Concord	c.1675	According to the Concord Historical Commission, the "Concord Old Block House" dates to at least 1675. It has since been altered both exteriorly and interiorly with elements from the 18th to 20th century. Exposed framing of the basement and attic including the latter's structural system suggest dates in the 17th century. In 1928 the house was moved to its present location to make way for a bank. Earlier build dates which include 1635–36 to the 1660s are speculative.
Deane Winthrop House		Winthrop	1675	Dendrochronology confirms that Deane Winthrop built the earliest portion of his house in 1675. This original portion consists of a "single cell" structure which is two and one half stories in height. An addition to the east side was later added by Winthrop in 1695 which widened the chimney bay. The only other known modification is a lean-to spanning the four easternmost bays which was added sometime in the 18th century. There is suspicion that the foundation of the house also dates to this period based on the construction used. This would mean that the house was possibly moved to its present location.
Hoxie House		Sandwich	c.1675	Reverend John Smith first occupied this house around 1675, and served as a pastor from 1673 until 1689. The house was subsequently acquired by a retired whaling captain named Abraham Hoxie in the 1850s or by 1860. It remained in the Hoxie family until 1957, when the town of Sandwich took possession of the house due to unpaid owed property taxes. The "deteriorated" house was extensively restored in 1959 which retained most of the original structural members, however the fireplaces and chimneys had to be rebuilt. This house is now operated as a museum by the town.
John Capen House	N/A	Milton (Note: Moved from Dorchester after 1909.)	1675	This house was originally built in Dorchester by John Capen in 1675. As built, the structure consisted of an end chimney bay and a range of two side by side rooms. An additional room and chamber was added to the right of the chimney in the mid-eighteenth century. Later additions were also added to the rear of the house along with a lean-to. The house remained in the Capen family until 1909 when it was scheduled to be demolished. It was saved by Kenneth G. T. Webster, who purchased the house and moved it to Milton where it stands today.
John James House	—N/a	Norwell	c.1675	John James I "may have constructed a small house" which would later become the present structure's ell portion. This small house later passed through the family to Joshua James c.1820. It was around this time that he and William Tilden built the main saltbox style portion. It has since changed ownership several times and remains a private residence.
Narbonne House		Salem	1675	The Narbonne House is located on the waterfront at the Salem Maritime National Historic Site and owned by the National Park Service. Dendrochronology conducted in 2002 dated the oldest part of the house which faces west to 1675. A separate story-and-one-half building with gambrel roof was attached to the original portion of the house sometime between 1725 and 1750.
The Witch House		Salem	c.1675	Also called the Jonathan Corwin House, this was the home of Judge Jonathan Corwin who presided over the Salem Witch Trials of 1692. Corwin bought the unfinished house from Nathaniel Davenport sometime in 1675, and later had it completed. It remained in the Corwin family, and was altered and enlarged by a descendant c. 1746–1747. Another addition was made at the southeast corner of the house as early as 1851, and succeeding additions were made to the rear by 1897. Major changes occurred in 1945 when the structure was reverted to its original form based upon documentary research, building archaeology, and presumption. The house now consists of "much twentieth-century material".
William Cleaves House	N/A	Beverly	c.1675	This House dates to about 1675, and was home to William Cleaves and his wife Martha Corey (daughter of Giles Corey). Over time the structure was enlarged with additions and ells and is now "hardly recognizable as a 17th century building".
Benjamin Scott, Jr. House	—N/a	Rowley	c.1676	While this house is attributed to Benjamin Scott, Jr. it remains unclear if the build date is 1662 or 1676. The former of these two dates is from an unpublished study done in 1936 which gives the builder as Benjamin Scott Sr. In either case, both men are related to Margaret Scott, who was hung as a witch in 1692. The house has since been "beautifully restored" and shows no major alterations other than attached ell/with garage.
Jonathan and Joseph Turner House	—N/a	Norwell	c.1676	The original portion of this house was built sometime around 1676 by tanner John Turner Sr. for his sons, Jonathan and Joseph. It eventually fell under the ownership of Dr. Cushing Otis in 1803. Otis extensively remodeled the house in 1806 by adding ten feet to the west of the original structure, creating a sixth bay. This new section expanded the front parlor, and gave Otis a small office for his practice. The house remained unchanged until the mid-late 20th century when porches were added along with interior alterations to the house.
Joseph Daniell Sr. House	—N/a	Millis	c.1676	Joseph Daniell Sr. built this house sometime in 1676 to replace a previous one lost in the King Phillips War. The smaller earlier one-one-half story structure is now located behind a larger addition which was added c.1870. While Greek Revival elements have also since been added to the original exterior portion, wide pine flooring, wall paneling, and an open fireplace remain in the interior.
John Chinn-Thomas Kimball House	—N/a	Marblehead	c.1677	John Chinn built this house sometime around 1677 after acquiring the land from a Lynn merchant. His son subsequently lived in the house afterwards until 1722 when he sold it to Thomas Kimball. The Kimball family continued to own the residence, and in 1764 a descendant altered it by adding on a whole front section and covering the whole structure with a Gambrel roof. These changes also altered the interior which left only the original back portion of the house intact. The added on kitchen ells date to the 1960s.
Platts-Bradstreet House		Rowley	c.1677	This house was probably built by Samuel Platts before 1677 as a 2-story structure with 4 rooms and an attic. Sometime in the early 18th century a lean-to was added, and when the house passed into the Bradstreet family, a 2nd story was added to it. The latter of these changes wrapped the roof over the back of the chimney (see diagram in source). Sometime in 1941 a shoemaker's shop was moved to the property before the house fell into disrepair. After restoration in the 1990s the property is now owned by the Rowley Historical Society.
Whipple House		Ipswich	1677	The Whipple House is a National Historic Landmark which was dated using dendrochronology in 2002. The oldest parts of the house were shown to date to 1677 for a house that was two-and-one-half stories in height, featuring a facade gabble. Additions to the house have since been made which occurred in 1690, and later in 1790. The latter of these dates was a substantial addition at 24 feet in length east of the chimney that included a second facade gable. In 1928 the house was moved to its present location where it now serves as a museum.
Coffin House		Newbury	1678	This house features one of the oldest extant examples of the principal rafter/common purlin roof. The "Coffin" house (named after the original land owner) was dated using dendrochronology to 1678, with the oldest portion of the house being the south west ell. Later additions include a cross-wing on the north east side which was added in 1713. The house became two official dwellings in 1785, when the Coffin brothers legally divided the structure.
Cushing Homestead		Hingham	c.1678	
Curzon's Mill House		Newburyport	c.1678	John Emery Jr. originally built a corn grinding mill house (Note: This mill was originally run by a water wheel, and also served as a residence.) on this property sometime in 1678. It thereafter remained in the Emery family until 1761, when Stephen Emery sold the property to Jonathan Bagley of Amesbury. Afterwards, the house eventually fell under the ownership of the Curzon family in 1820. The only 17th-century features remaining are the foundation, and some planking due to a fire in 1840 which largely destroyed the original structure. Curzon's Mill was rebuilt, and ceased operations in 1906 when a dam was created to make a reservoir for the town.
Henry Sewall House	—N/a	Newbury	c.1678	
Roger Sumner House	—N/a	Milton	c.1678	The house was extensively renovated in 2007
Lt. Samuel Giddings House	—N/a	Essex	c.1678	
Sgt. Samuel Stetson House	—N/a	Norwell	c.1678	
Bowerman-Saconesset House		Falmouth	c.1678	Thomas Bowerman Jr. built this house sometime around 1678. While not much is known about the residence's architectural history, some of the original structure still stands. The property remained in the Bowerman family until 1897, and later operated as the Saconesset Homestead Museum in the 1960s and 1970s. Another name of unknown origin given for the residence is "Ship's Bottom Roof House". It was listed by the Falmouth Historical Commission in 2018 as a "Full Cape, bowed roof, rare e.g".
Anthony Bennett House	—N/a	Gloucester	c.1679	
Balch House		Beverly	1679	The oldest portion of the Balch house was found to date to 1679 via dendrochronology study. This home was originally a single room cottage one-and-one-half stories in height, with a now removed chimney bay. Later descendants of the Balch family constructed the single room two-story southern part of the house in 1721. The original portion of the house was raised to two stories, and attached to this newer portion which created a central chimney. Modern restoration work was undertaken in 1921–1922, and again in 1961–1962.
Joslyn-Wharf House	—N/a	Gloucester	c.1679	Henry Joslyn built this house sometime around 1679 after receiving a grant of land between the lots of Timothy Somes and Thomas Riggs. He later sold the house in 1693 to Nathaniel Wharf who had married Riggs's daughter. An assessment done by the Gloucester Historical Commission in 1985 suggests that the roof could have been raised at some point as the central chimney does not sit at the roof ridge.

== See also ==
- List of historic houses in Massachusetts
- List of the oldest buildings in Massachusetts
- Oldest buildings in the United States
