= Jeremiah Chaplin =

American academic administrator and theologian (1776–1841)

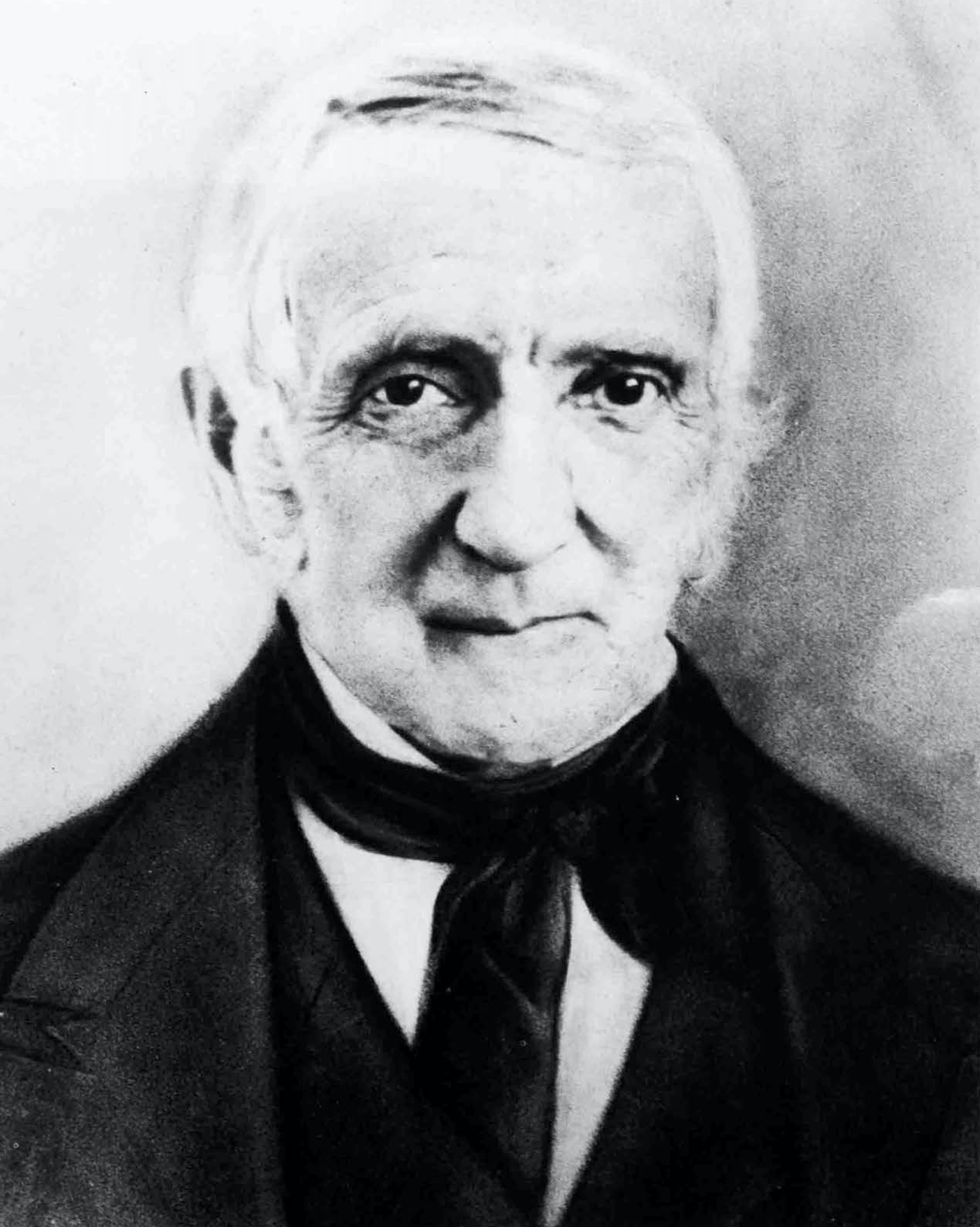

Founder and President of Colby College
- In office 1822–1833
- Succeeded by: Rev. Rufus Babcock

Personal details
- Born: January 2, 1776 Rowley, Massachusetts (now Georgetown, Massachusetts)
- Died: May 7, 1841 (aged 65) Hamilton, New York
- Spouse: Marcia O'Brien Chaplin
- Education: Brown University

Jeremiah Chaplin (January 2, 1776 – May 7, 1841) was a Reformed Baptist theologian who served as the first president of Colby College (then called the Waterville College) in Maine.

Chaplin was born in Rowley, Massachusetts (now Georgetown, Massachusetts) in 1776 to a Baptist family. He attended Brown University, a school with a historical Baptist affiliation, graduating in 1799 with a Bachelor of Arts. Chaplin spent a year at Brown as a tutor and pursued additional theological study to become a minister. To this end, he studied under Thomas Baldwin of the Second Baptist Church in Boston.

In 1802 he became minister of the Baptist church in Danvers, Massachusetts. Chaplin remained in Danvers through 1817 with the exception of a 1804 stint at the First Baptist Church in the City of New York.

Chaplin left his pastorate in Danvers in 1817 to become president of the new Waterville College (later Colby College) at which he served until 1833. Chaplin first met Gardner Colby during this period while Colby was still a child, and Chaplin assisted Colby's family after Colby's father died.

During the remainder of his life, Chaplin preached in Rowley, Massachusetts and Willington, Connecticut, and then moved to Hamilton, New York where he died in 1841. Chaplin held to a Calvinist Baptist theology throughout his life.

A Liberty ship constructed in 1943, the SS Jeremiah L. Chaplin, was named in his honor.

== Published works ==
- Chaplin, Jeremiah (1872). Life of Henry Dunster, first president of Harvard College. J.R. Osgood and Co. OCLC 11250203.
- Chaplin, Jeremiah; Chaplin, Jane Dunbar (1865). The life of Charles Sumner. Sheldon and Co. OCLC 2034090.
- Chaplin, Jeremiah (1874). Duncan Dunbar : the record of an earnest ministry : a sketch of the life of the late pastor of the McDougal St. Baptist Church, New York. D. Lothrop. OCLC 317694352.
- Chaplin, Jeremiah (1876). The life of Benjamin Franklin. D. Lothrop and Co. OCLC 2741719.
- Chaplin, Jeremiah (1881). Chips from the White House; or, Selections from the speeches, conversations, diaries, letters, and other writings, of all the presidents of the United States. D. Lothrop and Co. OCLC 2949595.
- Chaplin, Jeremiah (1886). Words of our hero, Ulysses S. Grant. D. Lothrop and Co. OCLC 52292874.
- Chaplin, Jeremiah (1859). The evening of life, or, Light and comfort amid the shadows of declining years. Gould and Lincoln. OCLC 9494622.
