= Concord Old Block House =

Historic house in Massachusetts, US

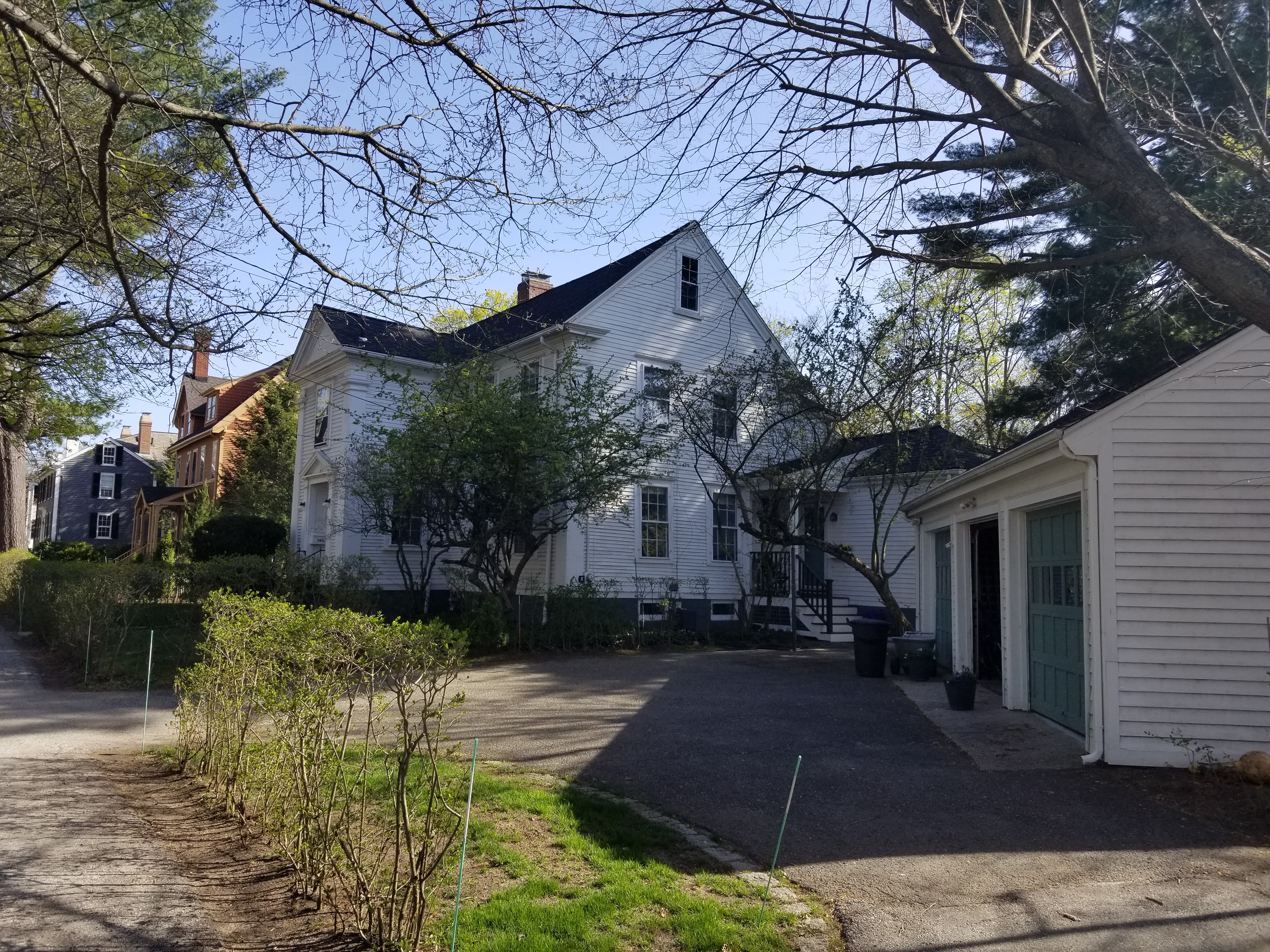
- View of house from Lowell Road

- Location within Massachusetts

General information
- Type: House
- Architectural style: First Period
- Location: Concord, Massachusetts, 57 Lowell Road
- Coordinates: 42.46253°N 71.35118°W
- Completed: c. 1636 (traditional) c. 1675 (MACRIS)

Concord Old Block House is a historic First Period house at 57 Lowell Road in Concord, Massachusetts.

== History ==
The "Concord Old Block House" is said to have been moved from near Main Street northeast of the South Burying Ground and was the home of Rev. John Jones (a founder of Concord). Traditionally, the home was built as early as 1635 or 1636 and served as a garrison from attacks during King Philip's War in the 1670s. The original build date has since been in question as the Concord Historical Commission places the date to at least 1675. All of the earlier build dates which also include proposals up to the 1660s are now considered to be speculative. The Concord Old Block House has since been altered both exteriorly and interiorly with elements from the 18th to 20th century. Exposed framing of the basement and attic including the latter's structural system suggest dates in the 17th century. The entire house was moved during the winter of 1928–1929 from what is now the site of Middlesex Savings Bank at 64 Main Street.

== See also ==
- First Period houses in Massachusetts (1660–1679)
- List of the oldest buildings in Massachusetts
