= Jane Dunbar Chaplin =

American novelist and abolitionist

- Born: February 11, 1819; Scotland
- Died: April 17, 1884; Boston
- Occupation: Writer
- Spouse: Jeremiah Chaplin
- Children: Christine Chaplin Brush

Jane Dunbar Chaplin (February 11, 1819 – April 17, 1884) was an American novelist and abolitionist.

Jane Dunbar was born on February 11, 1819 in Scotland, the daughter of Duncan Dunbar, a Baptist minister, and Christine Fletcher Dunbar. The family emigrated to New York City in 1821. In 1841 she married Jeremiah Chaplin, a Baptist minister and son of Rev. Jeremiah Chaplin the first president of Colby College.

Many of Chaplin's works were religiously-oriented works for children, published by the American Tract Society. Her 1853 novel The Convent and the Manse, published under the pseudonym "Hyla", was an anti-Catholic novel which purported (like numerous similar fictional works at the time) to expose the misdeeds of Catholic nuns. Her Gems of the Bog: A Tale of Irish Peasantry (1869) traces the lives of the Sheenan family through various trails until their emigration to America. Abolitionism was a feature of several of Chaplin's works. Her Black and white; Or, the heart, not the face (1863) was a "pseudo slave narrative" about a fictional woman named Juno Washington. Her Out of the Wilderness (1870) follows African-Americans Zeke and Weza as they migrate to New England. With her husband, she wrote a biography of abolitionist Charles Sumner, published in 1874.

Jane Dunbar Chaplin died on 17 April 1884 in Boston.

== Partial bibliography ==
- The Convent and the Manse (John P. Jewett, 1853) as "Hyla"
- Songs for my children (American Tract Society, 1861)
- Fire-Light Stories (American Tract Society, 1862)
- Black and white; Or, the heart, not the face (American Tract Society, 1863)
- Gems of the Bog: A Tale of Irish Peasantry (1869)
- Out of the Wilderness (H.A. Young & Co., 1870)
- The Life of Charles Sumner (D. Lothrop & co, 1874) with Jeremiah Chaplin
