= Bradstreet Farm =

Farm in Massachusetts, USA

Coordinates: 42.716906°N 70.86483°W

Bradstreet Farm in Rowley, Mass. is believed to be the second-oldest continually operating farm in the U.S. Originally deeded by King Charles I of England to Humphrey Bradstreet in 1635, the property remained in the Bradstreet Family for many generations until 2007, when the Town of Rowley purchased the 120-acre parcel including a 19th century farmhouse and 18th century barn. The Town set aside 103 acres as conservation land, and sold seven acres including the farmhouse and barn as a private residence with historic preservation restrictions. The property is listed on the National Register of Historic Places.

== Geography ==
When the King’s Grant was originally bestowed to the Bradstreet Family, the property was part of Ipswich, Mass.; Rowley was incorporated four years later, in 1639, and the Bradstreet Farm was annexed to Rowley in 1785. About 60 percent of the Bradstreet Farm property lies within a salt marsh area known as the Great Marsh. Approximately one mile of it fronts the Rowley River.

== The barn at Bradstreet Farm ==
The barn at Bradstreet Farm is one of the earliest U.S. examples of an English barn. The original portion of the barn on the property was constructed circa 1774, and the “L” rear portion of the barn was built in the early 1900s. The barn features original haylofts, horse stalls and antique farm equipment. The building is now part of the private residence, and has been restored for private events.

== The farmhouse at Bradstreet Farm ==
The current farmhouse was built circa 1837. It is believed to be the third house to be built on the property, with the first two lost to fires in the 17th and 19th centuries. The farmhouse, built on the site of the original 17th century house, is now a private residence that has been fully restored with oversight from the Rowley Historical Commission.
