= Christine Chaplin Brush =

American flower painter and author

- Born: May 1842; Bangor
- Died: February 3, 1892; New Utrecht
- Occupation: Writer
- Parents: Jeremiah Chaplin (father); Jane Dunbar Chaplin (mother)

Christine Chaplin Brush (May 1842 – February 3, 1892) was an American flower painter and author.

Chaplin was born in May 1842 in Bangor, Maine. She was the daughter of two authors, Jane Dunbar Chaplin and the Jeremiah Chaplin.

Chaplin painted primarily watercolors of wildflowers. She studied with Charles Chaplin and Henri Harpignies in Paris. Her works Petunias and Nasturtiums were reproduced as chromolithographs by Louis Prang. She taught drawing at the State Normal School in Framingham, Massachusetts.

Her novel The Colonel's Opera Cloak (1879) was initially published anonymously as part of the No Name Series from the publishers Roberts Brothers. She also wrote short stories and poems for a number of magazines.

In 1878 she married Alfred H. Brush. He became the pastor of the New Utrecht Reformed Church, and her book Inside Our Gate (1889) is about their life in New Utrecht, New York.

Chaplin died on February 3, 1892, in New Utrecht.

== Bibliography ==
- The Colonel's Opera Cloak (1879)
- Inside Our Gate (1889)
