= Great Marsh =

Salt marsh in Massachusetts and New Hampshire, United States

- Great Salt Marsh
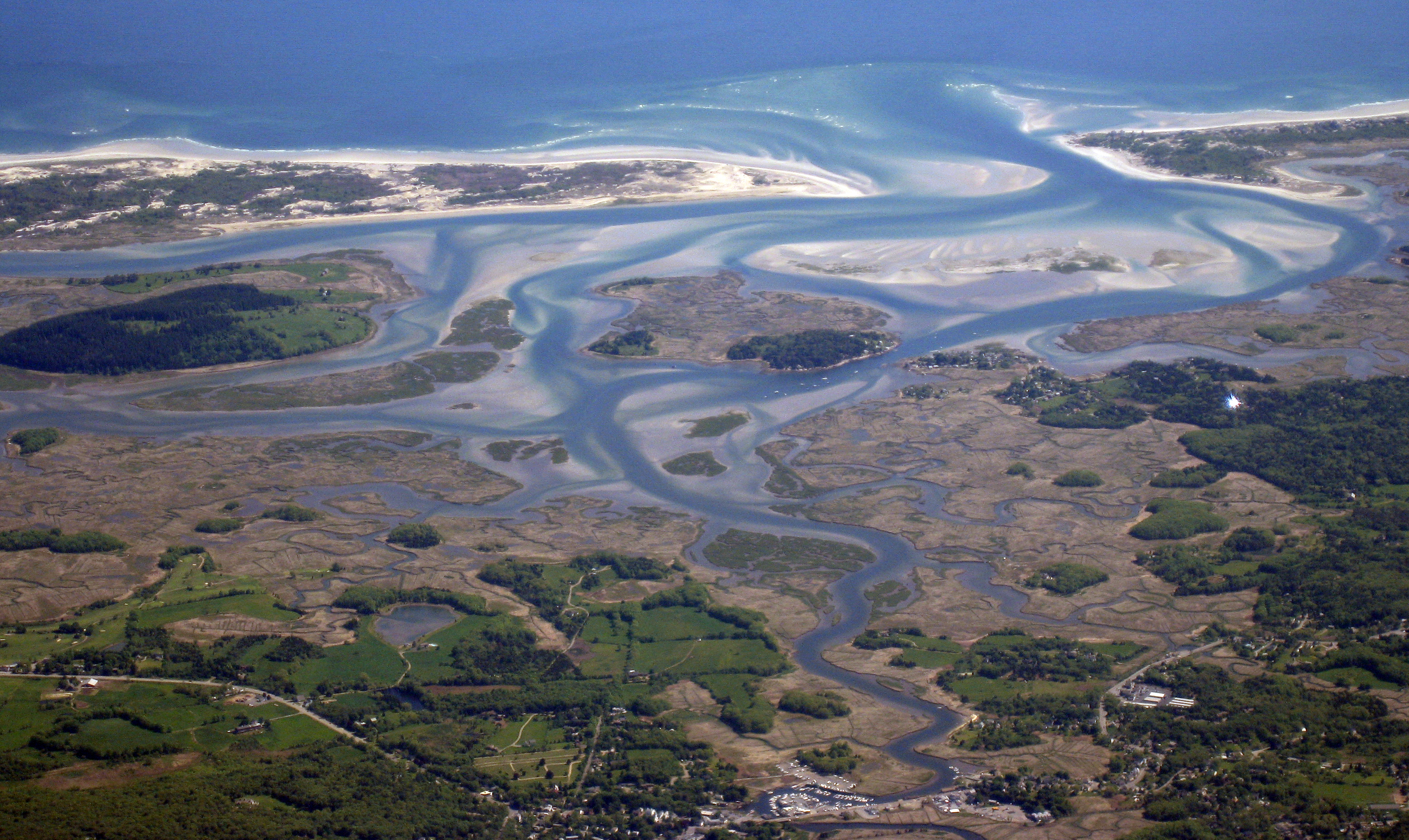
- The Great Marsh in Plum Island, Newbury, Rowley, and Ipswich, Massachusetts

- Location within Massachusetts
- Location: Massachusetts; New Hampshire
- Coordinates: 42.735277°N 70.818914°W
- Type: Saltmarsh
- River sources: Parker River
- Ocean/sea sources: Atlantic Ocean
- Surface area: 20,000–30,000 acres (8,100–12,100 ha)
- Salinity: Salt Water
- Frozen: Salt water Lake
- Islands: Plum Island
- Settlements: In New Hampshire: Hampton; Seabrook; In Massachusetts: Salisbury; Newburyport; Newbury; Rowley; Ipswich; Essex; Gloucester

The Great Marsh (also sometimes called the Great Salt Marsh) is a long, continuous saltmarsh in eastern New England extending from Cape Ann in northeastern Massachusetts to the southeastern coast of New Hampshire. It includes roughly 20,000 to 30,000 acres (8,100 to 12,100 hectares) of saltwater marsh, mudflats, islands, sandy beaches, dunes, rivers, and other water bodies. The Great Marsh makes up much of the northeastern half of Essex County, Massachusetts, and touches the towns and cities of Gloucester, Essex, Ipswich, Rowley, Newbury, Newburyport, and Salisbury in Massachusetts as well as the towns of Seabrook and Hampton in New Hampshire. It is a designated Important Bird Area.
