= Platts-Bradstreet House =

Historic house in Massachusetts, United States

- U.S. National Register of Historic Places
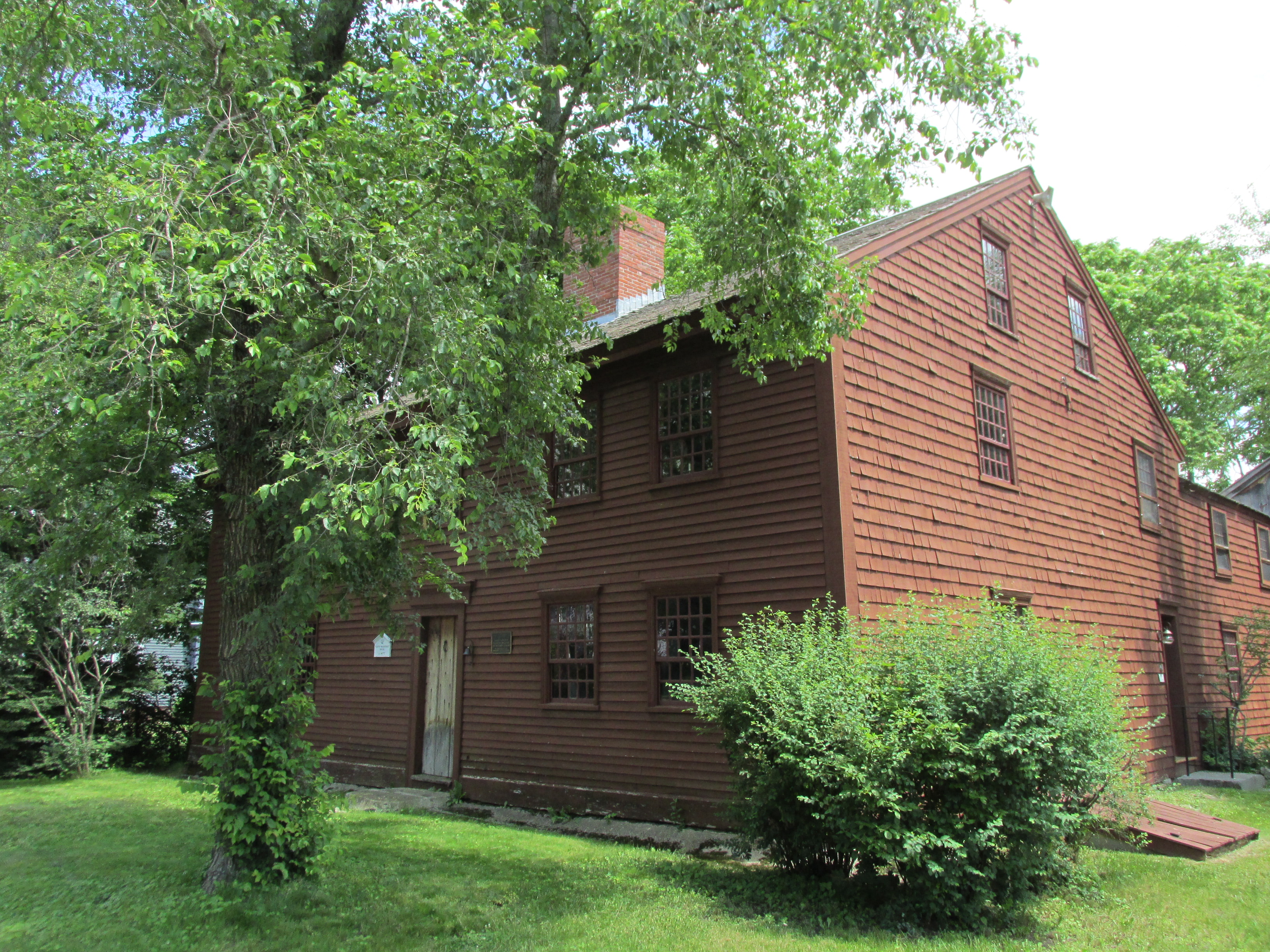
- Platts-Bradstreet House

- Location within Massachusetts Location within the United States
- Location: 233 Main St., Rowley, Massachusetts
- Coordinates: 42°43′7″N 70°52′31″W
- Area: about 0.5 acres (0.20 ha)
- Built: c.1677 (MACRIS)
- NRHP reference No.: 80000645
- Added to NRHP: September 27, 1980

The Platts-Bradstreet House, is a historic house museum at 233 Main Street in Rowley, Massachusetts. Its oldest portion dating to about 1677, it is a well-preserved example of First Period architecture, modified by repeated addition during the 18th century. The house has belonged to the Rowley Historical Society since the 1920s. It was listed on the National Register of Historic Places in 1980.

== Description and history ==
The Platts-Bradstreet House is set on the southeast side of Main Street Massachusetts Route 1A opposite its junction with Pleasant Street in the village center of Rowley. The house is a 2 1/2-story wood-frame structure with a two-story rear ell, wooden clapboard siding, and a large central chimney. The front facade, facing the street, is an asymmetrical five bays, with the entrance in the center bay and sash windows elsewhere. The entrance is set in a simple frame with an overhanging cornice. In addition to the house, the property includes a barn, a small shoe shop, and a long rectangular structure with a pitched roof.

The oldest portion of the house, a full-width two-story structure with a depth of one room, was probably built in 1677 by Samuel Platts (1617-1682), who purchased the land in 1660 and was charged with tax on a house in that year. Early in the 18th century this structure was enlarged by adding a lean-to section, which would have given the house a classic New England saltbox appearance. In the late 1760s Moses Bradstreet (d. 1786) raised the lean-to section to a full two stories, giving the main block its present form. The interior styling of the house also appears to date to this time period. Because of the property's long history of use, it is believed to have historical archaeological artifacts relative to the domestic history of its occupants. The property has been owned by the Rowley Historical Society since the 1920s.

== See also ==
- National Register of Historic Places listings in Essex County, Massachusetts
- List of the oldest buildings in Massachusetts
