= Stetson–Ford House =

Historic house in Massachusetts, United States

- U.S. National Register of Historic Places
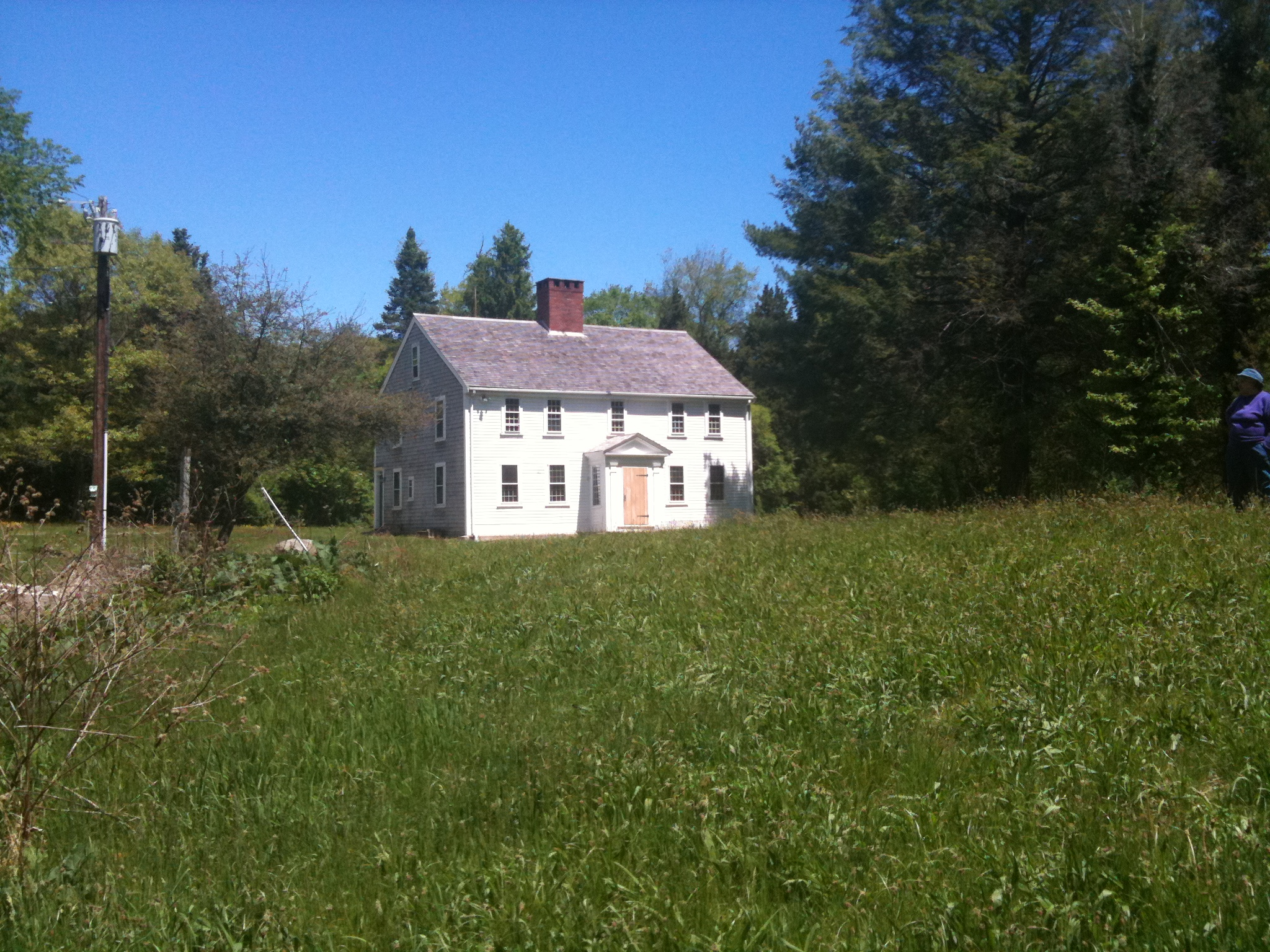
- 2010 photo

- Location within Massachusetts Location within the United States
- Location: Norwell, Massachusetts
- Coordinates: 42°7′18″N 70°47′5″W
- Built: c.1674 (MACRIS)
- Architect: Stetson, Thomas; Ford, Michael
- Architectural style: Georgian, Federal
- NRHP reference No.: 98000120
- Added to NRHP: March 9, 1998

The Stetson–Ford House is a historic First Period house at 2 Meadow Farms Way in Norwell, Massachusetts. The oldest portion of this 2 1/2-story wood-frame house was built c. 1674 by Thomas Stetson, the son of one of the area's first English settlers. It was rebuilt and enlarged in the 1780s by the family of Michael Ford, who were leading shipbuilders of the area. The house was in Ford family hands into the 20th century, and is now owned by the town.

The house was listed on the National Register of Historic Places in 1998.

== See also ==
- National Register of Historic Places listings in Plymouth County, Massachusetts
