= Cushing Homestead =

Historic house in Massachusetts, United States

- U.S. National Register of Historic Places
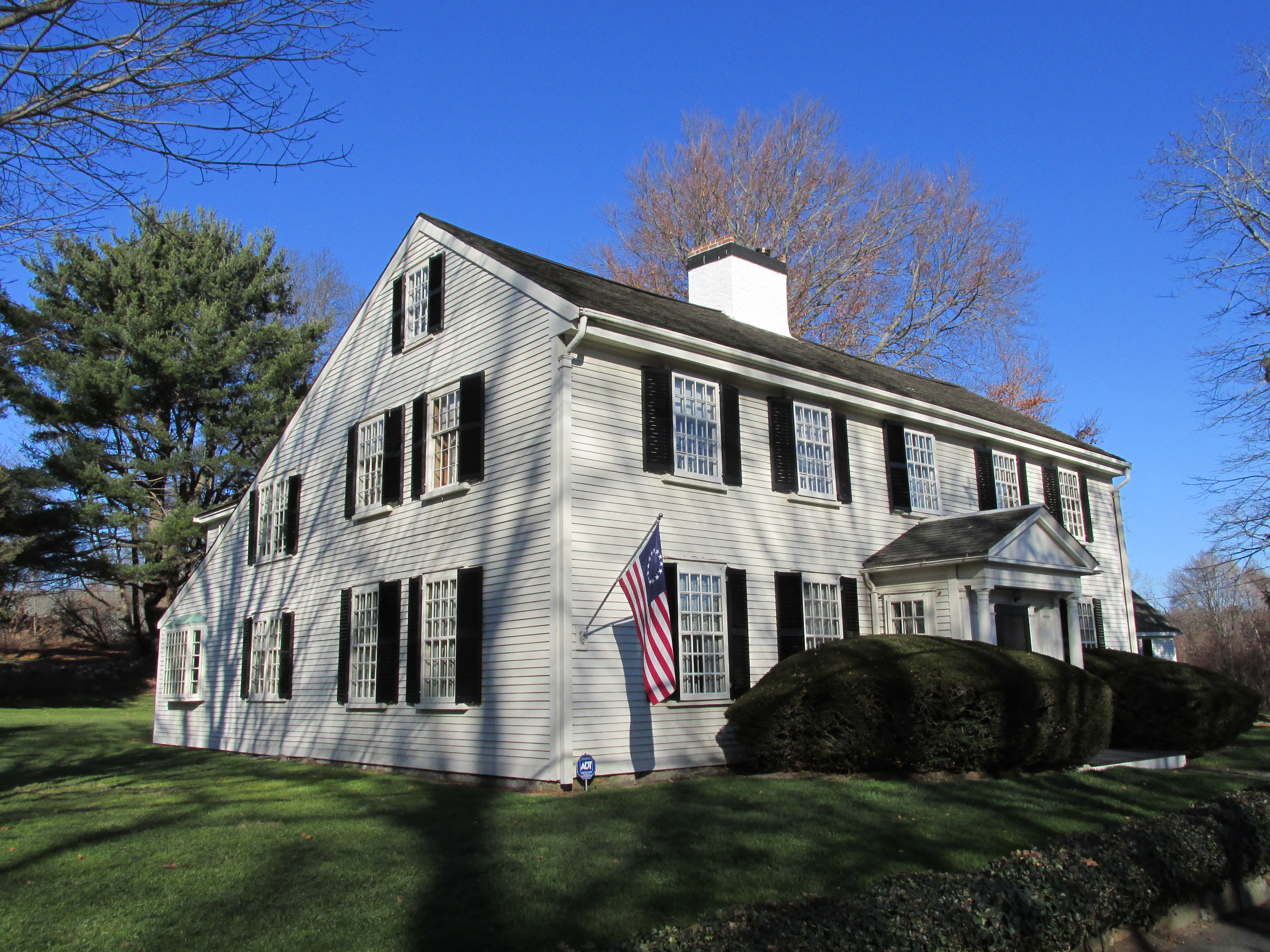

- Location within Massachusetts Location within the United States
- Location: 210 East Street; Hingham, Massachusetts
- Coordinates: 42°14′25″N 70°51′45″W
- Built: c.1678 (MACRIS)
- NRHP reference No.: 73000326
- Added to NRHP: June 4, 1973

The Cushing Homestead is a historic 2 1/2-story First Period saltbox-type house in Hingham, Massachusetts. As it stands today the residence has traces of both 17th-century English style as well as later 18th-century Georgian.

== History ==
Hingham town clerk and magistrate Daniel Cushing (1618–1699) was granted a plot of land from the town in 1665, and later built a house there for his son Peter (Cushing) sometime in 1678. There is "clear and visible" architectural evidence in the two front chambers and attic that the house was originally one-and-a-half stories high. This one-bay depth structure was later extended (creating a lean-to) before the 1700s toward the back of the property away from the street. At some point in time between the end of the 17th century to the early 18th century the house was raised to its current height. Evidence from this transition include a second set of rafters visible on the second floor. The second bay was possibly added (creating the saltbox-type house) in the mid to late 1700s when the lean-to was extended back again.

Both the NRHP entry and books written on the matter mention that the southwest corner of the house retains the original 17th century kitchen. When this room was restored in 1936 the original painted plastered walls and timbered ceiling were also discovered. Other elements that have been preserved intact include the exposed sills, girts, posts, ceiling beams, and shadow molding. The kitchen also includes extremely rare original "yellow on black sponge painting" (added c.1700) that adorns the ceiling rafters. Interior elements in the other bay of the house include pained wood-paneled ceiling beams. These are considered to be more formal decoration styles which date to the mid-1700s. Although electricity and plumbing have been added, the house still retains its "stylistic integrity".

Among the Cushing family members who have occupied the home since it was built was Capt. Peter Cushing (1741–1783), grandson and namesake of the first owner. A selectman and constable of Hingham, Capt. Cushing commanded a company of troops during the Revolutionary War under fellow townsman General Benjamin Lincoln.

An elm tree on the property, a local landmark for years, was famous as the place where pastor John Brown preached to a group of Minutemen from Cohasset in 1775. The soldiers afterwards took part in the Siege of Boston under Col. (later Brigadier General) John Greaton.

== See also ==
- List of the oldest buildings in Massachusetts
- National Register of Historic Places listings in Plymouth County, Massachusetts
