= Chaplin–Clarke House =

Historic house in Massachusetts, United States

- U.S. National Register of Historic Places
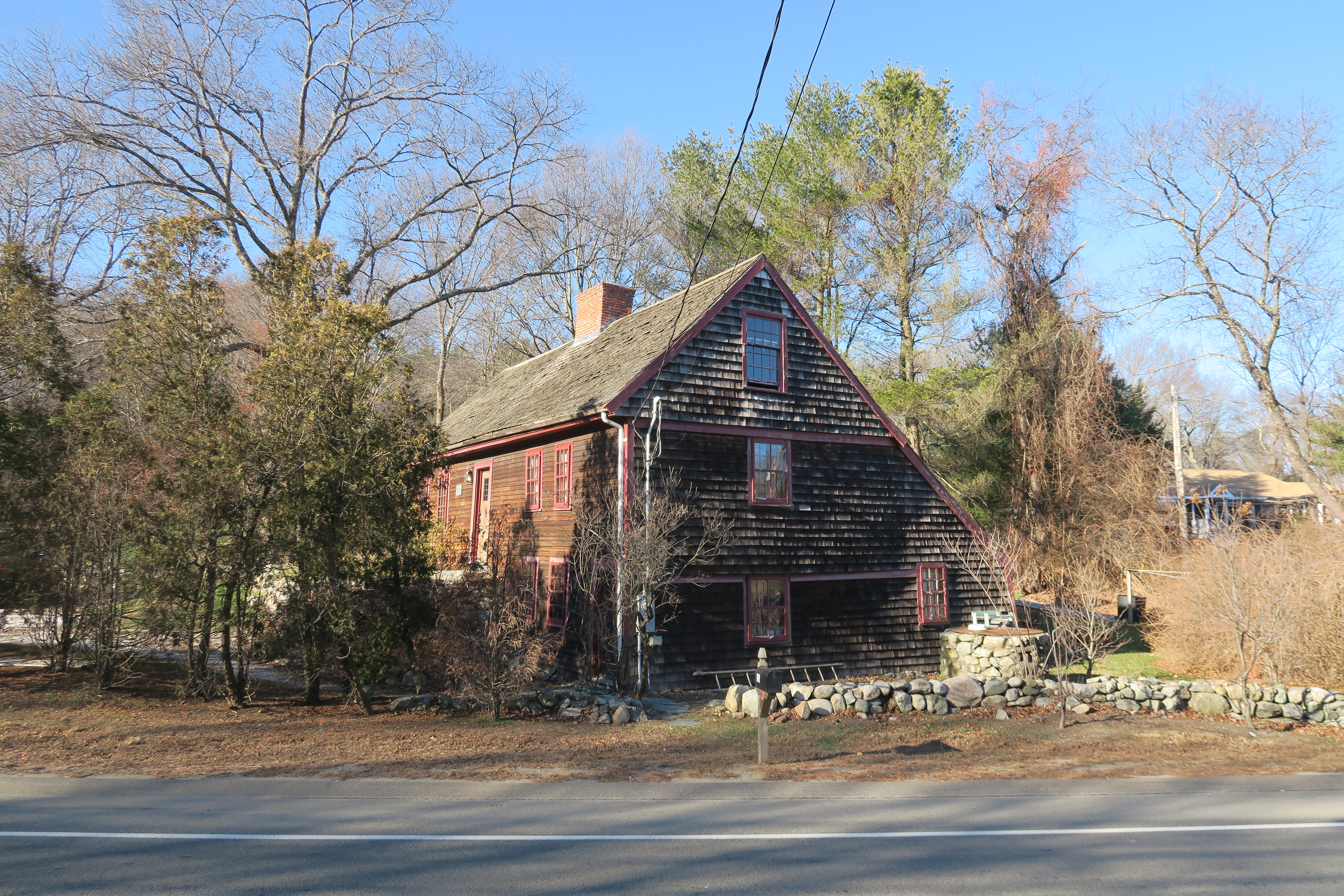
- Chaplin–Clarke House

- Location within Massachusetts Location within the United States
- Location: Rowley, Massachusetts
- Coordinates: 42°42′33″N 70°53′32″W
- Built: c.1671
- Architect: Joseph Chaplin
- NRHP reference No.: 79000343
- Added to NRHP: May 10, 1979

The Chaplin–Clarke House is a historic First Period house at 109 Haverhill Street in Rowley, Massachusetts. Its oldest section built c. 1670 by Joseph Chaplin, it is the oldest house in Rowley. The house began as a full-width, two-story wood-frame structure that was only one room deep; the lean-to section at the rear was added c. 1700. The house was acquired in the early 1700s by Richard Clarke, in whose family it remained until the early 20th century. It was owned for a time by the Society for the Preservation of New England Antiquities (now called Historic New England), but is now in private hands.

The house was listed on the National Register of Historic Places in 1979.

== See also ==
- List of the oldest buildings in Massachusetts
- National Register of Historic Places listings in Essex County, Massachusetts
