= Rowley, Massachusetts =

- Town
- Historic center of Rowley

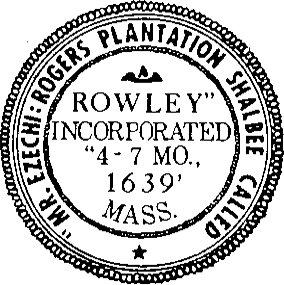
- Seal

- Location in Essex County and the state of Massachusetts.
- Coordinates: 42°43′00″N 70°52′45″W
- Country: United States
- State: Massachusetts
- County: Essex
- Settled: 1638
- Incorporated: 1639

Government
  - Type: Open town meeting

Area
  - Total: 20.3 sq mi (52.7 km^{2})
  - Land: 18.2 sq mi (47.2 km^{2})
  - Water: 2.2 sq mi (5.6 km^{2})
- Elevation: 49 ft (15 m)

Population (2020)
  - Total: 6,161
  - Density: 338/sq mi (131/km^{2})
- Time zone: UTC−5 (Eastern)
  - Summer (DST): UTC−4 (Eastern)
- ZIP Code: 01969
- Area code: 351/978
- FIPS code: 25-58405
- GNIS feature ID: 0618309
- Website: www.townofrowley.net

Rowley is a town in Essex County, Massachusetts, United States. The population was 6,161 at the 2020 census.

Part of the town comprises the census-designated place of Rowley.

== History ==
The area was inhabited by the Agawam people under sachem Masconomet. Although the area that would become Rowley was colonized by English settlers starting in 1639, it was not until 1700 that the town would pay Masoconomet's heirs nine pounds for a quitclaim deed.

In spring of 1638 Rowley was originally colonized as a plantation by Reverend Ezekiel Rogers, who had arrived from England on the ship John of London with approximately twenty families. Thomas Tenney was a co-founder of Rowley, Massachusetts, and was part of the group led by Reverend Ezekiel Rogers that settled the town in 1639. He came from Rowley, East Yorkshire, England, with his wife Ann, and was an original settler of the area, which was first known as Rogers Plantation. The John of London also brought over the first printing press in the colonies, which was later brought to Harvard University.

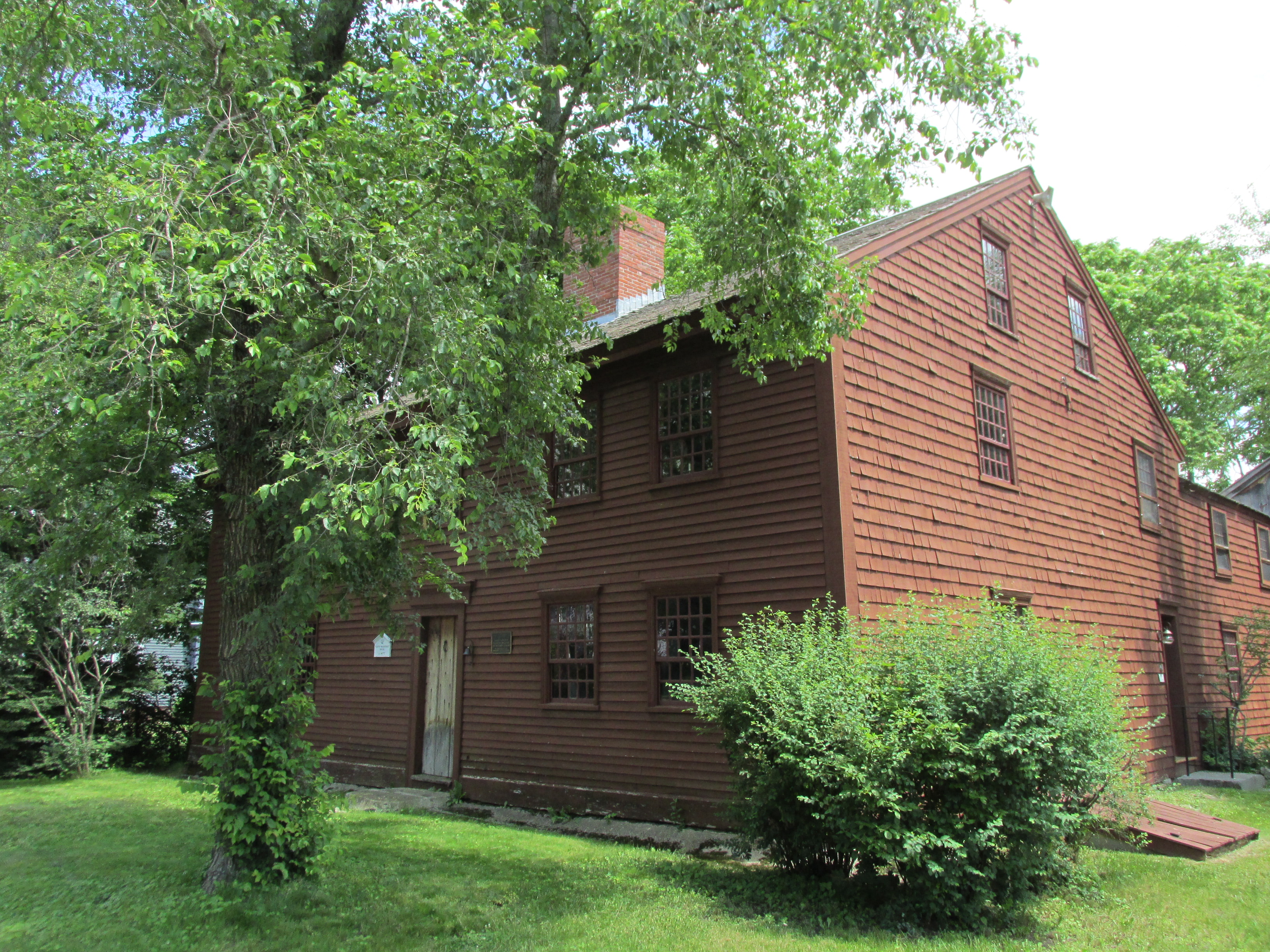
The Platts-Bradstreet House goes back to 1677, and is now the home of the Rowley Historical Society. The Humphrey Bradstreet Farm (a different location) goes back to 1635 and is thought to be the second-oldest continually operating farm in the United States. It was in the Bradstreet family for many generations until 2007, and is now owned by the town of Rowley.

The following fall, on September 4, 1639, the town was incorporated, and included portions of modern-day Byfield, Groveland, Georgetown, and Haverhill. The town was named after Rowley, East Riding of Yorkshire, where Rogers had served as pastor for twenty years before his suspension due to non-conformist Puritan beliefs. Rogers was installed as Rowley's pastor on December 3.

1643 and 1645 saw the construction of a fulling mill and grist mill, respectively. The town became known for its hemp and flax cloth, as well as cotton. In 1642, a keystone arch bridge and a dam were built on the Mill River for the fulling mill, the first such in the colonies. The bridge was the first stone arch bridge in North America, constructed entirely of hand-chiseled granite and contained no mortar. It was rebuilt in the mid-19th century. In 1669, a sawmill was established in town and is still in business today. A wagon factory was built in 1868 by Moses E. Daniels. Later, at the start of the 20th century, the town had a booming shoe industry, as well as successful boat building businesses.

== Education ==
One public elementary school serves Rowley, the Pine Grove Elementary School, located in town center. Middle school students attend Triton Regional Middle School, and high school students attend Triton Regional High School along with Newbury, and Salisbury.

== Geography ==
According to the United States Census Bureau, the town has a total area of 20.3 square miles (52.7 km^{2}), of which 18.2 square miles (47.1 km^{2}) is land and 2.2 square miles (5.6 km^{2}), or 10.56%, is water. Rowley lies along the Atlantic Ocean north of Cape Ann, the mainland separated from the ocean by a small portion of Plum Island and Plum Island Sound. The island and a portion of the marshes south of Mud Creek (part of the town's northern border) are protected as part of the Parker River National Wildlife Refuge.

The town has other portions which are protected, including parts of the Mill Creek Wildlife Management Area, the Georgetown-Rowley State Forest, the Willowdale State Forest, the Arthur Ewell Reservation, and the Bay Circuit Trail. Much of the eastern mainland part of town is marshy, feeding Mud Creek, Mill River and the Rowley River, which constitutes part of the town's southern border. This marsh is a portion of the Great Marsh, a major salt marsh which covers the coastal area of the North Shore from Cape Ann north to southern New Hampshire.

=== Roads ===
Rowley is located 7 miles (11 km) south of Newburyport, 16 miles (26 km) north of Salem, 17 miles (27 km) east of Lawrence, and 28 miles (45 km) northeast of Boston. It is bordered to the north by Newbury, to the northwest by Georgetown, to the west by Boxford, and the south by Ipswich.

Interstate 95 passes through the western end of town, with the nearest exits being in Georgetown and Boxford. U.S. Route 1, known as the Newburyport Turnpike in the area, passes near the geographic center of town, and Massachusetts Route 1A passes through the eastern part of town, through the town center. All three roads are connected by Massachusetts Route 133, which passes from west to east through the town, becoming coextensive with Route 1A just north of the Ipswich town line and heading south with it.

Rowley is one of the stations along the Newburyport/Rockport Line of the MBTA Commuter Rail, providing service between Newburyport to the North Shore and Boston's North Station. The nearest national air service can be found at Boston's Logan International Airport, though Plum Island Airport, a small general aviation airport, is located in neighboring Newburyport.

=== Climate ===
Climate data for Rowley, Massachusetts
Month	Jan	Feb	Mar	Apr	May	Jun	Jul	Aug	Sep	Oct	Nov	Dec	Year
Mean daily maximum °F (°C)	35.1 (1.7)	38.0 (3.3)	45.7 (7.6)	57.0 (13.9)	67.3 (19.6)	76.1 (24.5)	81.6 (27.6)	80.0 (26.7)	72.1 (22.3)	61.1 (16.2)	50.7 (10.4)	40.2 (4.6)	58.7 (14.8)
Daily mean °F (°C)	25.0 (−3.9)	27.5 (−2.5)	35.2 (1.8)	45.6 (7.6)	55.6 (13.1)	64.9 (18.3)	70.5 (21.4)	69.1 (20.6)	61.1 (16.2)	49.6 (9.8)	40.5 (4.7)	30.5 (−0.8)	47.9 (8.8)
Mean daily minimum °F (°C)	14.9 (−9.5)	17.0 (−8.3)	24.6 (−4.1)	34.2 (1.2)	43.8 (6.6)	53.6 (12.0)	59.3 (15.2)	58.1 (14.5)	50.0 (10.0)	38.1 (3.4)	30.2 (−1.0)	20.8 (−6.2)	37.1 (2.8)
Average precipitation inches (mm)	3.8 (97)	3.6 (91)	5.2 (130)	4.4 (110)	4 (100)	3.8 (97)	3.4 (86)	3.9 (99)	4.5 (110)	4.7 (120)	4.3 (110)	3.8 (97)	49.4 (1,247)
Average snowfall inches (cm)	15.3 (39)	11.4 (29)	11.4 (29)	2.5 (6.4)	0 (0)	0 (0)	0 (0)	0 (0)	0 (0)	0.1 (0.25)	1.8 (4.6)	11.3 (29)	53.8 (137.25)
Average precipitation days (≥ 0.01 in)	11.1	8.4	10.3	10.1	11.4	10.6	9.5	8.4	8.5	9.2	10	10	117.5
Average snowy days (≥ 0.1 in)	6.3	4.8	3.7	0.8	0	0	0	0	0	0.1	1	4	20.7
Average relative humidity (%)	16.3	17.4	23.2	32.6	43.6	55	60.6	60.1	53.7	42.1	32.4	22.5	38.3
Source: bestplaces

== Demographics ==
Historical population
Year	Pop.	±%
1790	1,772	—
1800	1,577	−11.0%
1810	1,682	+6.7%
1820	1,825	+8.5%
1830	2,044	+12.0%
1840	1,203	−41.1%
1850	1,075	−10.6%
1860	1,278	+18.9%
1870	1,157	−9.5%
1880	1,201	+3.8%
1890	1,248	+3.9%
1900	1,391	+11.5%
1910	1,368	−1.7%
1920	1,249	−8.7%
1930	1,356	+8.6%
1940	1,533	+13.1%
1950	1,768	+15.3%
1960	2,783	+57.4%
1970	3,040	+9.2%
1980	3,867	+27.2%
1990	4,452	+15.1%
2000	5,500	+23.5%
2010	5,856	+6.5%
2020	6,161	+5.2%
2023*	6,358	+3.2%
* = population estimate. Source: United States census records and Population Estimates Program data.

As of the census of 2000, there were 5,500 people, 1,958 households, and 1,468 families residing in the town. The population density was 293.8 inhabitants per square mile (113.4/km^{2}). There were 2,004 housing units at an average density of 107.1 per square mile (41.4/km^{2}). The racial makeup of the town was 98.38% White, 0.24% Black or African American, 0.25% Native American, 0.45% Asian, 0.27% from other races, and 0.40% from two or more races. Hispanic or Latino of any race were 0.85% of the population.

There were 1,958 households, out of which 39.0% had children under the age of 18 living with them, 64.5% were married couples living together, 7.7% had a female householder with no husband present, and 25.0% were non-families. 20.1% of all households were made up of individuals, and 7.3% had someone living alone who was 65 years of age or older. The average household size was 2.77 and the average family size was 3.23.

In the town, the population was spread out, with 28.0% under the age of 18, 5.9% from 18 to 24, 32.5% from 25 to 44, 24.3% from 45 to 64, and 9.4% who were 65 years of age or older. The median age was 38 years. For every 100 females, there were 97.8 males. For every 100 females age 18 and over, there were 92.1 males.

The median income for a household in the town was $62,130, and the median income for a family was $75,527. Males had a median income of $49,970 versus $32,500 for females. The per capita income for the town was $27,413. About 3.3% of families and 4.1% of the population were below the poverty line, including 5.8% of those under age 18 and 11.4% of those age 65 or over.

== Literature ==
Rowley is the town to which the protagonist flees from fictional Innsmouth in the H. P. Lovecraft short story "The Shadow Over Innsmouth". In the story, Innsmouth is located to the southeast of Rowley.

Rowley is also featured in Chapter Three of The American Pageant, by Thomas A. Bailey, an American history textbook often used in AP United States History courses.

In Chesapeake, James Michener lists Rowley as one of several towns in the 17th century where Quakers were whipped in the town common en route to expulsion into Rhode Island.

In The Nightmare Murders, Ken Blaisdell sets the story about tracking down a serial killer in his original hometown of Rowley.

Rowley lends its namesake to the character of the same name from the Diary of a Wimpy Kid series by Jeff Kinney.

== In popular culture ==
The 1947 film 13 Rue Madeleine was filmed in part at the site of the Fenno Estate in Rowley.

The 2019 film Sound of Metal was filmed in part in Rowley, particularly on sites around the salt marshes and a scene at the Agawam Diner.

== Places of Interest ==
- Agawam Diner
- Chaplin-Clarke House
- Platts-Bradstreet House

== Notable people ==
- Jacob Bailey, author and clergyman of the Church of England
- Jeremiah Chaplin, first President of Colby College
- Parker Cleaveland, geologist and mineralogist
- Henry Harriman, one of the First Seven Presidents of the Seventy of the Church of Jesus Christ of Latter Day Saints
- Bruce Kimball, retired NFL football player for the Washington Redskins and New York Giants
- Edward Kimball (1823-1901), Sunday School teacher and church debt raiser
- Eddie MacDonald, NASCAR driver
- Jerry Moses, former catcher for the Boston Red Sox
- Josiah Little Pickard, educator
- Nathaniel Prime, merchant and banker based in New York City, pioneer in specializing in trading securities
- Margaret Scott, hanged during the Salem witch trial
- John S. Tenney, former Justice of the Maine Supreme Judicial Court

== See also ==
- List of mill towns in Massachusetts
