= List of people from Worcester, Massachusetts =

The following is a list of prominent people who were born in Worcester, Massachusetts, lived in Worcester, or for whom Worcester is a significant part of their identity.

== Academics and inventors ==
- Richard T. Antoun (1932–2009), professor emeritus of Anthropology at Binghamton University
- Harvey Ball (1921–2001), inventor of the smiley face
- Alan T. Busby (1895–1992), educator and first African-American alumnus of the University of Connecticut
- Harold W. Chase (1922–1982), educator and United States military officer
- Robert H. Goddard (1882–1945), father of modern rocketry
- David Green (born 1963), president of Colby College
- G. Stanley Hall (1846–1924), the first president of Clark University
- John Kneller (1916–2009), English-American professor and fifth president of Brooklyn College
- Leonard Morse (1929-2025), university professor of clinical medicine
- Lawrence Park (1873–1924), art historian, architect, and genealogist
- Francis E. Reed (1852–1917), inventor and industrialist who founded F.E. Reed & Co.
- Joshua C. Stoddard (1814–1902), inventor and beekeeper
- Daniel B. Wesson (1825–1906), gunsmith, co-founder of Smith & Wesson

== Actors and artists ==
- John Wolcott Adams (1874–1925), artist
- Nubar Alexanian (1950–), Armenian-American documentary photographer
- Edith Ella Baldwin (1846–1920), artist
- H. Jon Benjamin, actor best known as the voices of Sterling Archer on Archer, Bob Belcher on Bob's Burgers, and Can of Vegetables in the Wet Hot American Summer franchise
- Christopher Boffoli, photographer
- Elbridge Boyden, architect of Mechanics Hall
- Zara Cully, actress best known for The Jeffersons
- Stephen DiRado, photographer
- Stephen C. Earle, architect
- Paul Fontaine, abstractist colorist painter
- Joslyn Fox, drag queen, contestant on Rupaul’s Drag Race season 6
- Ryan Idol, adult film actor
- Rita Johnson, actress, co-starred opposite Spencer Tracy in Edison, The Man
- Jean Louisa Kelly, actress from Yes, Dear
- Arthur Kennedy, Oscar-nominated, Tony Award-winning actor
- Dorothy Stratton King, painter and printmaker
- Diane and Elaine Klimaszewski, actresses and models best known as the "Coors Light Twins"
- Jarrett J. Krosoczka, children's book author and illustrator; his Punk Farm optioned by DreamWorks Animation
- Denis Leary, actor and comedian
- Tom Lewis, artist and activist
- Joyner Lucas, rapper
- John Lurie, actor, musician, and composer
- Nora Marlowe (1915–1977), actress
- Eddie Mekka, actor best known for playing Carmine Ragusa on Laverne and Shirley
- Alisan Porter, former child actress and winner of Season 10 of The Voice
- Terri Priest, artist
- Sam Qualiana, actor and filmmaker involved with many low-budget horror films, including Snow Shark (2012)
- Joyce Reopel, artist
- Renee Sands, former child actress and singer from Kids Incorporated and Wild Orchid
- Sam Seder, podcast host of The Majority Report, actor, writer and director
- Joseph Skinger, silversmith, sculptor
- Doug Stanhope, comedian known for abrasive style and for The Man Show
- Lewis Stone (1879–1953), actor, The Secret Six, Grand Hotel, Andy Hardy series
- Erik Per Sullivan, actor, Malcolm in the Middle
- Wu Tsang, filmmaker, artist, and performer
- David Whitney, art curator
- Alicia Witt, actress, singer-songwriter
- Hildegard Woodward, children's book illustrator

== Athletes ==
- Jerry Azumah, former NFL defensive back
- Tyler Beede (born 1993), baseball pitcher for the San Francisco Giants
- Michael Bradley, professional basketball player and businessman
- Frank Carroll, US figure skater and coach, 1960 graduate of the College of the Holy Cross, actor
- Tim Collins, relief pitcher for the Kansas City Royals
- Alana Cook, soccer player for the United States national team
- Bob Cousy, Hall of Fame basketball player; attended the College of the Holy Cross; currently lives in Worcester
- Jay Cutler, former professional bodybuilder and 4x Mr. Olympia
- Ken Doane, professional wrestler
- Oliver Drake, relief pitcher, free agent
- Mark Fidrych, nicknamed "the Bird", professional baseball
- Rich Gedman, Boston Red Sox catcher, manager of the Worcester Tornadoes
- Bill Guerin, former Pittsburgh Penguins right winger
- Aaron Haddad, professional wrestler in WWE
- Tom Heinsohn, NBA Hall of Fame, Boston Celtics great; attended College of Holy Cross
- Gordon Lockbaum, attended Holy Cross College; twice finished in the top five in the Heisman Trophy balloting
- Dwayne McClain, former NBA/professional basketball player; starred at Villanova in the early/mid-1980s; attended Holy Name Catholic Central
- Stephen Nedoroscik, artistic gymnast, two-time Olympic medalist
- Tom Poti, former NHL defenseman
- J.P. Ricciardi, MLB executive, former general manager of the Toronto Blue Jays
- José Antonio Rivera, WBA light middleweight champion
- Richard Rodgers, 3rd-string tight end for the Philadelphia Eagles; played for St. John's High School
- Edwin Rodríguez, boxer
- Rosy Ryan, professional baseball pitcher, played ten seasons, known for his time with the World Series Champion New York Giants
- Tanyon Sturtze, former MLB pitcher
- Major Taylor, track cycling champion
- Bill Toomey, gold medal decathlete, 1968 Olympics; attended Worcester Academy
- Leah Van Dale, professional wrestler better known by her ring name Carmella
- Ryan Ward, outfielder for the Los Angeles Dodgers
- Vinnie Yablonski, NFL player

== Musicians ==
- John Adams, popular composer
- Duncan Arsenault, musician
- Norman Bailey, big band trumpet player from The Lawrence Welk Show
- Jaki Byard, jazz pianist, composer and recording artist
- Frank Capp, jazz drummer and bandleader
- Luke Caswell, better known as Cazwell, rapper
- Wendell Culley, jazz trumpeter from Worcester who played with Noble Sissle, Lionel Hampton, and Count Basie's Orchestra, and many others
- Warren Ellsworth (1950–1993), operatic tenor
- Don Fagerquist, jazz trumpeter
- Four Year Strong, rock band
- J. Geils, lead in J. Geils Band, attended Worcester Polytechnic Institute
- J. Geils Band, formed in Worcester as a fraternity party band at Worcester Polytechnic Institute, as Snoopy and the Sopwith Camels
- Georgia Gibbs, 1950s pop singer
- The Hotelier, rock band
- Jordan Knight, member of the boy band New Kids On The Block
- Duke Levine, guitarist
- Joyner Lucas, rapper
- Arun Luthra, jazz saxophonist, konnakol artist, composer, arranger, band leader
- Miriam "Mamie" Moffitt, jazz pianist and band leader of Mamie Moffitt and Her Five Jazz Hounds, the first professional jazz ensemble in Worcester
- Orpheus, band that enjoyed popularity in the 1960s and early 1970s
- Cole Porter, Broadway composer, student at Worcester Academy ca. 1912, born in Peru, Indiana
- Andy Ross, guitarist for rock band OK Go
- Matt Scannell, lead vocalist, lead guitarist and founding member of the alternative rock band Vertical Horizon
- Maureen Steele, pop singer and songwriter, one of the very few white artists signed to Motown during the mid-1980s
- Einar Swan, multi-instrumental jazz musician and songwriter of "When Your Lover Has Gone"
- Boots Ward, jazz drummer, band leader, and Worcester jazz club owner

== Politicians ==
- Charles Allen (1797–1869), United States congressman from Massachusetts
- George Bancroft, 17th United States secretary of the navy, founder of the US Naval Academy at Annapolis, author of the first comprehensive history of the United States
- John Binienda, Massachusetts state legislator
- Alexander H. Bullock, governor of Massachusetts (1866–1868)
- Anthony J. Burke, member of Massachusetts House of Representatives
- Kate Campanale, member of Massachusetts House of Representatives from District 17
- Joseph Casello, member of the Florida House of Representatives
- John Curtis Chamberlain, U.S. representative
- John Davis, 17th Governor of Massachusetts
- Dorothea Dix, reformer and activist
- Abby Kelley Foster, abolitionist, suffragette
- Dwight Foster, Massachusetts attorney general and associate justice of the Massachusetts Supreme Judicial Court
- Roger Sherman Baldwin Foster, lawyer
- Emma Goldman, Lithuanian-American anarchist; owned ice cream parlor in Worcester
- Joseph T. Higgins, member of the New York State Assembly
- Thomas Wentworth Higginson, abolitionist, literary mentor to Emily Dickinson
- Abbie Hoffman, radical activist
- Bertha Knight Landes, first female mayor of a major American city (Seattle)
- Levi Lincoln Jr., governor of Massachusetts
- Levi Lincoln Sr., revolutionary
- Jim McGovern, U.S. representative from Massachusetts's 2nd congressional district
- William D. Mullins, state representative and baseball player
- Albert L. Nash, politician and businessman
- Richard Neal, U.S. representative from Massachusetts's 1st congressional district
- Kenneth P. O'Donnell, appointments secretary and political adviser to President John F. Kennedy
- Robert Owens, businessman and Massachusetts state senator
- Frances Perkins, workers-rights advocate and first female member of a presidential cabinet
- John Rucho, politician and businessman
- Charles F. Sullivan, mayor of Worcester and lieutenant governor of Massachusetts, 1949–1953
- Benjamin Swan, longest-serving Vermont state treasurer
- Charles G. Washburn, member of the U.S. House of Representatives

== Writers and journalists ==
- Jane G. Austin, writer
- Mike Barnicle, print and broadcast journalist, social and political commentator
- S. N. Behrman, playwright, author of memoir The Worcester Account
- Robert Benchley, writer and member of the Algonquin Round Table
- Elizabeth Bishop, poet and writer
- John D. Casey, novelist and translator
- John Dufresne, novelist and screenwriter
- Alice Morse Earle, writer
- Esther Forbes, writer
- Samuel Fuller, screenwriter, producer and director
- John Michael Hayes, writer of the Alfred Hitchcock films Rear Window, To Catch a Thief, The Trouble with Harry, and The Man Who Knew Too Much
- Isabel Hornibrook, children's literature writer
- Omar Jimenez, CNN reporter, known for being arrested on live TV while reporting on the George Floyd protests in Minneapolis
- Judith Katz, American playwright, thespian, and novelist
- Stanley Kunitz, Poet Laureate
- Frank O'Hara, poet
- Charles Olson, modernist poet
- Leah Lakshmi Piepzna-Samarasinha, poet, writer, educator, and social activist
- Charlie Pierce (born 1953), writer/journalist, and panelist on NPR's Wait Wait... Don't Tell Me
- Normand Poirier, writer
- Olive Higgins Prouty, writer, known for "Now, Voyager" and "Stella Dallas"
- Ernest Lawrence Thayer, poet and journalist, known for "Casey at the Bat"
- Isaiah Thomas, publisher of the Massachusetts Spy
- Stanley Woodward, newspaper editor and sportswriter

== Other ==
- Lillian Asplund, last survivor of the Titanic who remembered the actual sinking. Also last American survivor
- Nathaniel Bar-Jonah, convicted child molester, possible serial killer and cannibal
- Timothy Bigelow, Revolutionary War patriot
- Paul Bilzerian (born 1950), financier convicted of securities fraud
- William Austin Burt, 19th-century explorer and surveyor in Michigan
- Richard P. Cipro, US Army brigadier general
- Jonas Clark, founder of Clark University
- Edmund L. Daley (1883–1968), U.S. Army major general
- Edgar C. Erickson (1896–1989), United States Army major general and chief of the National Guard Bureau
- Catherine Fiske (1784–1837), school founder
- John Stanley Grauel (1917–1986), Christian Zionist leader
- Samuel Fisk Green (1822–1884), physician and medical missionary, served with the American Ceylon Mission 1847–1873
- Samuel R. Heywood, founder of the Heywood Boot & Shoe Company
- Myra Kraft, philanthropist, wife of New England Patriots owner Bob Kraft
- Royal B. Lord (1899–1963), United States military officer
- Joe Morrone, Connecticut Huskies soccer coach
- David Naleski (1952–2026), United States Navy veteran, diesel mechanic, and trade union shop steward
- Charley Parkhurst, stagecoach driver and horseman
- Irving Price, co-founder of Fisher Price toys and games
- Michael Ritchie, artistic director
- George Edward Rueger (1929–2019), Roman Catholic bishop
- Stephen Salisbury III, founder of the Worcester Art Museum
- Richard B. Sellars (1915–2010), chairman and CEO of Johnson & Johnson
- Madeline Singas, attorney and jurist
- Ichabod Washburn, founder of Worcester Polytechnic Institute
- Steven N. Wickstrom, Army National Guard major general who commanded the 42nd Infantry Division
- Stillman Witt (1808–1875), Ohio railroad and steel executive, banker
- Geoffrey Zakarian, Iron Chef, Food Network Channel celebrity chef
