= Anthony Burke =

Anthony Burke may refer to:

- Anthony D. Burke, Australian political theorist and international relations scholar
- Anthony Burke (architect) (born 1970/1), Australian professor of architecture and television presenter
- Anthony Burke (cricketer) (1897–1942), Irish cricketer and officer in both the British Army and the British Indian Army
- Anthony J. Burke (1931–1993), American politician, member of the Massachusetts House of Representatives
- Tony Burke (Anthony Stephen Burke, born 1969), Australian politician
