= New Hampshire Wildcats =

Athletic program that represent the University of New Hampshire

- University: University of New Hampshire
- Nickname: Wildcats
- NCAA: Division I (FCS)
- Conference: America East Conference (primary); CAA (football); Hockey East; EAGL (women's gymnastics); EISA (skiing)
- Athletic director: Ryan Colton
- Location: Durham, New Hampshire
- Varsity teams: 19 sports
- Football stadium: Wildcat Stadium
- Basketball arena: Lundholm Gymnasium
- Ice hockey arena: Whittemore Center
- Soccer stadium: Bremner Field
- Other venues: Paul Sweet Oval; Reggie Atkins Track and Field Facility
- Colors: Blue, gray, and white
- Mascot: Wild E. Cat, Gnarlz
- Fight song: On To Victory
- Website: unhwildcats.com

The New Hampshire Wildcats, or 'Cats, are the American intercollegiate athletic teams representing the University of New Hampshire (UNH), located in Durham. The wildcat is the school's official mascot, the colors are UNH Blue and white. The University of New Hampshire competes at the National Collegiate Athletic Association (NCAA) Division I level as a full member of the America East Conference, and sponsors teams in seven men's, eleven women's and one coed NCAA sanctioned sports. However, the men's and women's hockey teams are members of Hockey East, the gymnastics team is a member of the East Atlantic Gymnastics League (EAGL), and the ski team is a member of the Eastern Intercollegiate Ski Association (EISA). The football team plays as an associate member of the Coastal Athletic Association in the NCAA Division I Football Championship Subdivision, the second tier of Division I formerly known as Division I-AA.

The Wildcats won an NCAA national championship in 1985 (women's lacrosse) and the American Women's College Hockey Alliance national title in 1998 (women's ice hockey, pre-NCAA). UNH won the women's lacrosse national championship game 6–5 over, and the women's hockey national championship 4–1 over Brown Bears women's ice hockey.

== Sports sponsored ==
Men's sports	Women's sports
Basketball	Basketball
Cross country	Cross country
Football	Field hockey
Ice hockey	Gymnastics
Soccer	Ice hockey
Track and field^{1}	Lacrosse
	Soccer
	Swimming and diving
	Track and field^{1}
	Volleyball
Co-ed sports
Skiing
^{1} – includes both indoor and outdoor

=== Basketball ===
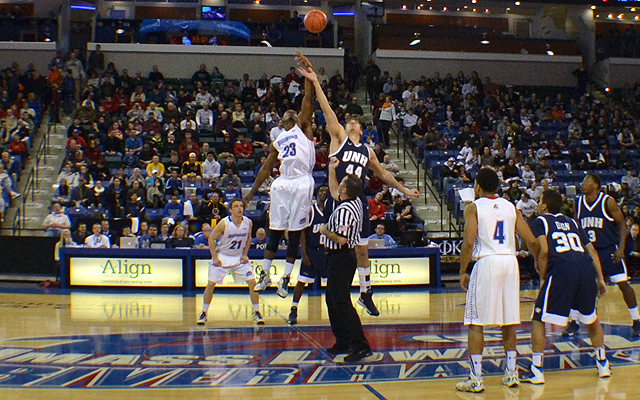
UNH (in dark) v Umass Lowell game in 2014

The men's basketball program has a long-standing reputation for futility even though the team has improved significantly in recent years. UNH was one of the first schools to take up the sport, but since 1903, no Wildcats team has made it to the NCAA or NIT tournaments and no ex-Wildcat player has made it to the NBA. (However, a former Wildcats coach, Jim Boylan, later became the head coach of the Chicago Bulls and the Milwaukee Bucks) The Wildcats' rivalry with the Maine Black Bears is the longest continuous basketball rivalry between any two non-Ivy League schools: the men's teams have played each other 115 seasons in a row, from 1904 to 1905 thru 2018–2019. The university has invested greatly in both the men's and women's basketball programs since the hiring of Bill Herrion but they have yet to achieve the campus wide attention of the Hockey or Football teams.

=== Football ===
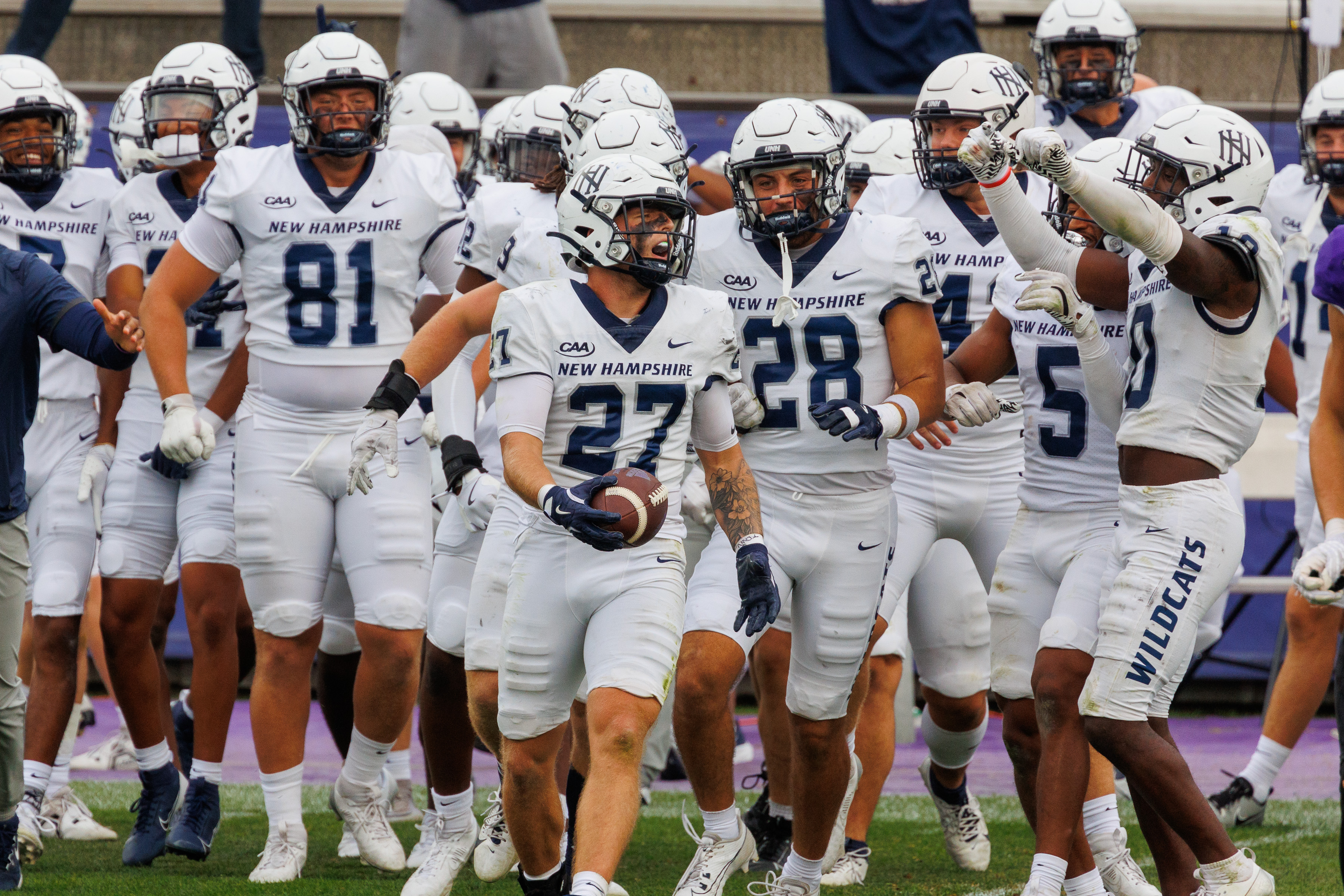
The Wildcats team in 2024

The football program was introduced at UNH in 1893 as a varsity team, and today they compete in the NCAA Division I. The team has had over 20 players drafted to the National Football League and has had one coach, Bill Bowes, be inducted into the College Football Hall of Fame. During their 2020 season, the team was unable to host spectators at their home field, Wildcat Stadium. The team ended the 2021 season with an overall record of 3-8. The longtime coach of the UNH Wildcats, Sean McDonnell, retired after the 2021 season after being with the team since 1999 and leading the Wildcats to over 100 wins during his tenure.

=== Ice hockey ===
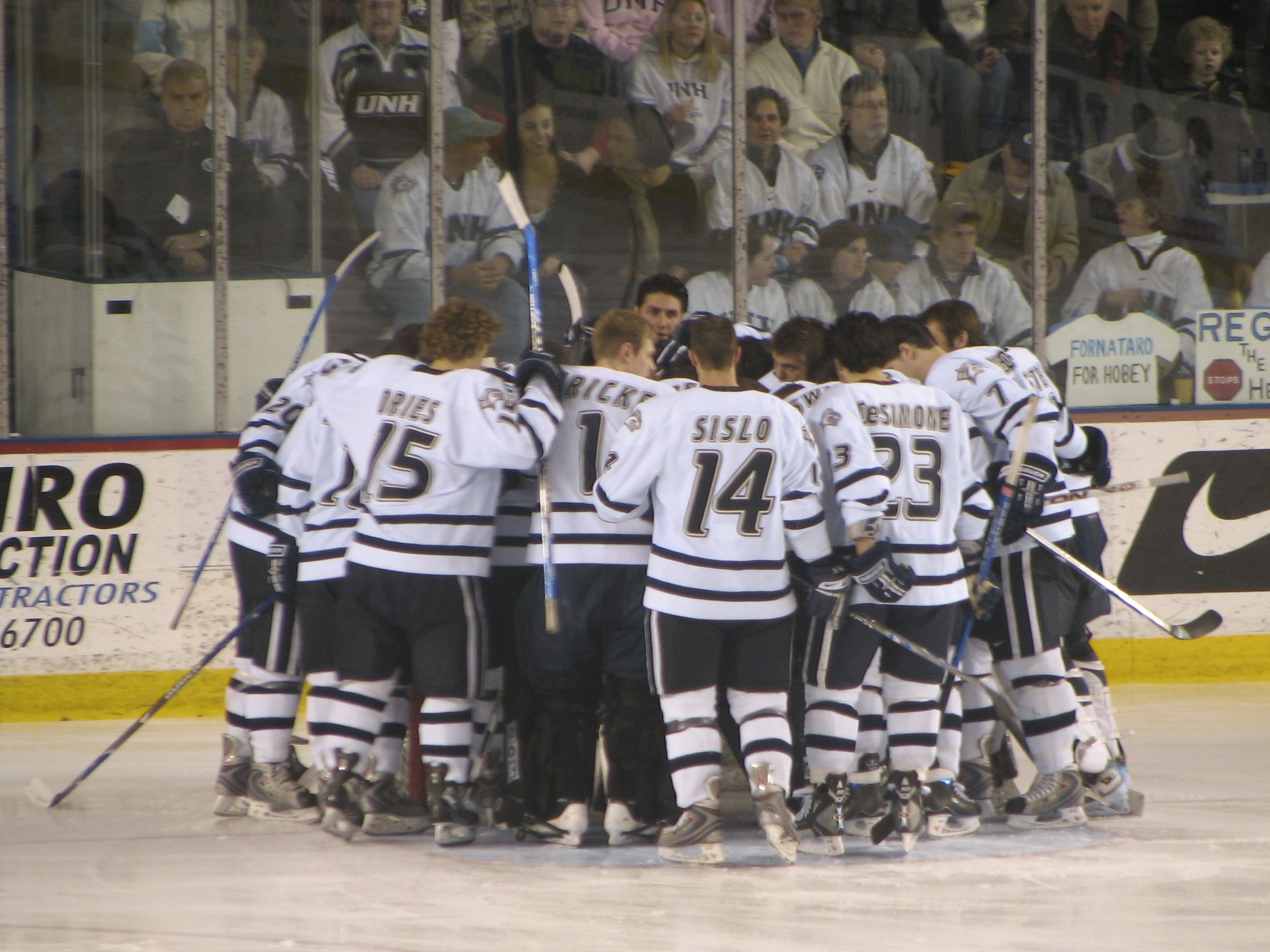
Men's players celebrating

The ice hockey teams are both perennial national powerhouses. Former Wildcat standout Rod Langway '79 was the first Wildcat ever to receive hockey's highest honor when he was inducted into the Hockey Hall of Fame. He won a Stanley Cup with the Montreal Canadiens in 1979 and joined the Washington Capitals in 1982, where he was captain for 11 years and was known to Capitals fans as the "Secretary of Defense". Langway was the first American in NHL history to win the Norris Trophy as the NHL's best defenseman.

=== Women's lacrosse ===
The lacrosse team at UNH competes in the America East Conference. The team was formerly coached my NCAA Champion and Team USA member, Sarah Albrecht. Now, the team is coached by Kacie Lewis (previously associate head coach at Bryant University) with assistance from Jenny Simpson and Kelsey Fee. On May 19, 1985 the team defeated Maryland 6-5 for the National Championship title. In July 2022, 90% of the team was places on America East Academic Honor roll. After the most recent season, in May of 2022, three players (Mackenzie MacEahern, Kelsey Macallum and Allie Connerty) received America East all-conference awards.

=== Men's soccer ===
New Hampshire Wildcats men's soccer The men's soccer team has had a recent resurgence under the guidance of Marc Hubbard. Hubbard is assisted by Associate head coach Rich Winrebe, Assistant Coach Joe Dincecco, and Goalkeeper Coach David Williams. Hubbard completed his first season as head coach of the UNH Wildcats with one of the best seasons in program history. The Granite State native took the team from a 6-10-1 mark in 2014 to a 10-5-3 record, including a 7-0-2 streak to start the 2015 campaign. At the end of the season, the team finished with a RPI of 52nd in the nation, improving on the ranking of 164 just a year before.

The team was first in the America East Conference in goals per game (1.56) and were issued the fewest yellow cards and second fewest fouls in the conference. The Wildcats also recorded the second lowest goals against average (1.00), allowing 19 goals in 18 games. New Hampshire keepers recorded five shutouts, including four straight games. Under Hubbard's tutelage, junior co-captain Chris Wingate earned the America East Midfielder of the Year Award and was an All-Conference First Team selection along with four additional Wildcats receiving All-Conference status.

Wingate was also named a NSCAA Division I Men's All-East Region First Team selection while senior co-captain Andrew Chaput was tabbed a NSCAA Division I Men's All-East Region Third Team honoree. The men's soccer program is heavily involved in Soccer Sphere which provides training programs to youth soccer players throughout the state of New Hampshire. In 2017 UNH received an at large bid to NCAA Tournament, its first tournament appearance since 1994. On November 16, 2017, UNH defeated Fairfield 3–0 in the first round of the NCAA Tournament advancing to the second round for the first time in school history. The Wildcats have claimed the title of America East Champions during their 2018, 2019, and 2020 seasons. Their cumulative records for these seasons include a 12-4-2, 4-2-1, 15-2-3, 5-1-1, and 8-1-1, 5-0-1 record. During their 2021 season, the Wildcats were honored by the New England Patriots owner, Robert Kraft, and his family, as the team embarked on their quest to round 16 of the NCAA Tournament game versus No. 1 ranked Oregon State in the Patriots private plane. With a loss against Oregon State, the UNH Wildcats end their 2021 season with a record of 17-2-2, 7-0-1.

== Former sports ==
In 1991, New Hampshire cut its wrestling and women's tennis teams as they had the subsidy to the athletic department cut to $309,000 from the university. In 1997, the university cut baseball, softball, men's and women's golf, and men's lacrosse from its program.

On January 31, 2006, Athletics Director Marty Scarano announced in the 2006 academic year the university was cutting women's crew, men's swimming & diving, and men's and women's tennis at the varsity level, and trimming the size of the men's ski team from 27 to 12. The reason given was the Athletic Department would save $500,000 towards a $1,000,000 budget shortfall and be in compliance with Title IX for the first time.

== Hall of fame ==
The University of New Hampshire Athletics Hall of Fame began in 1982. There is a portrait of each member in the UNH Field House.

== Facilities ==
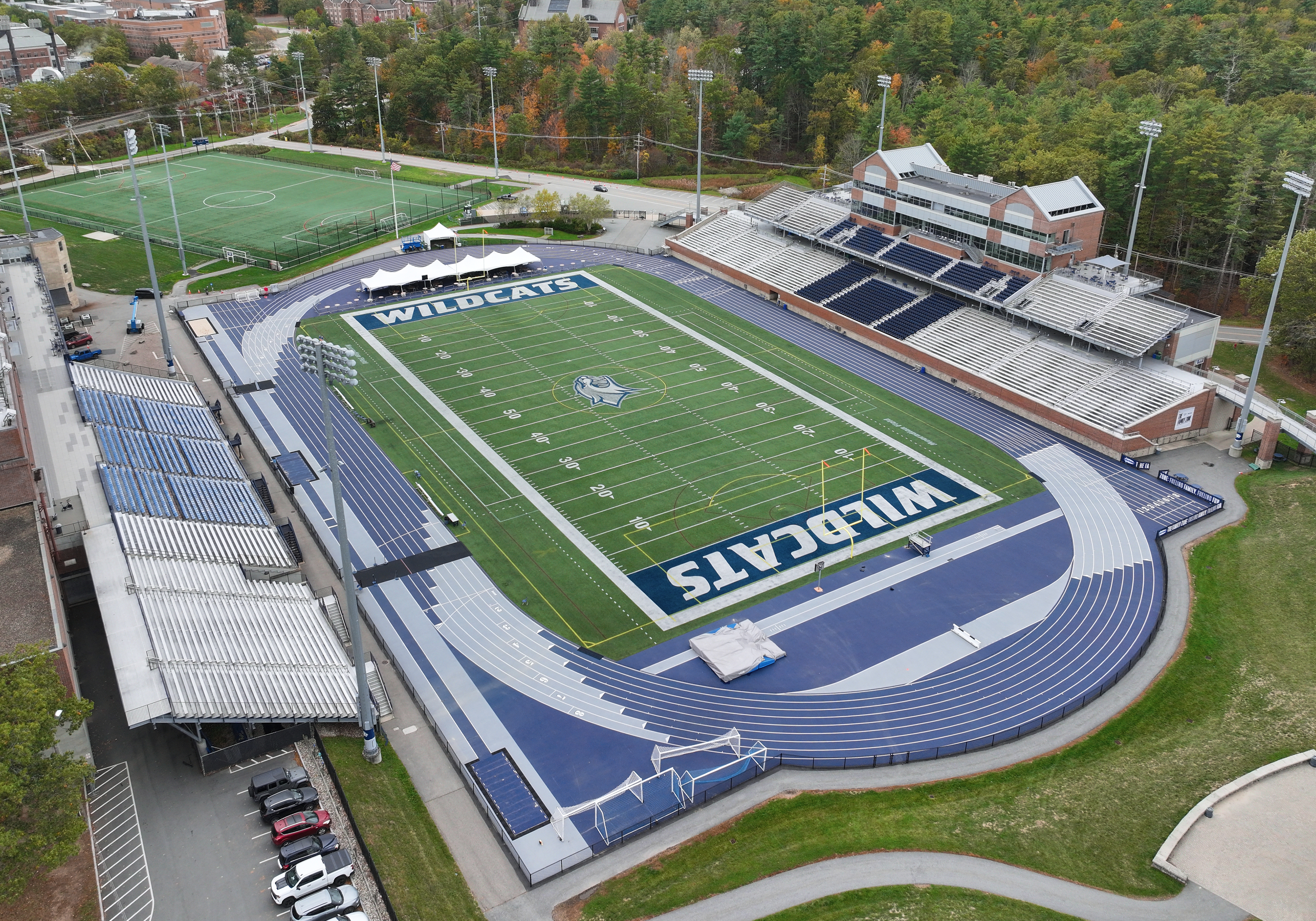
Wildcat Stadium

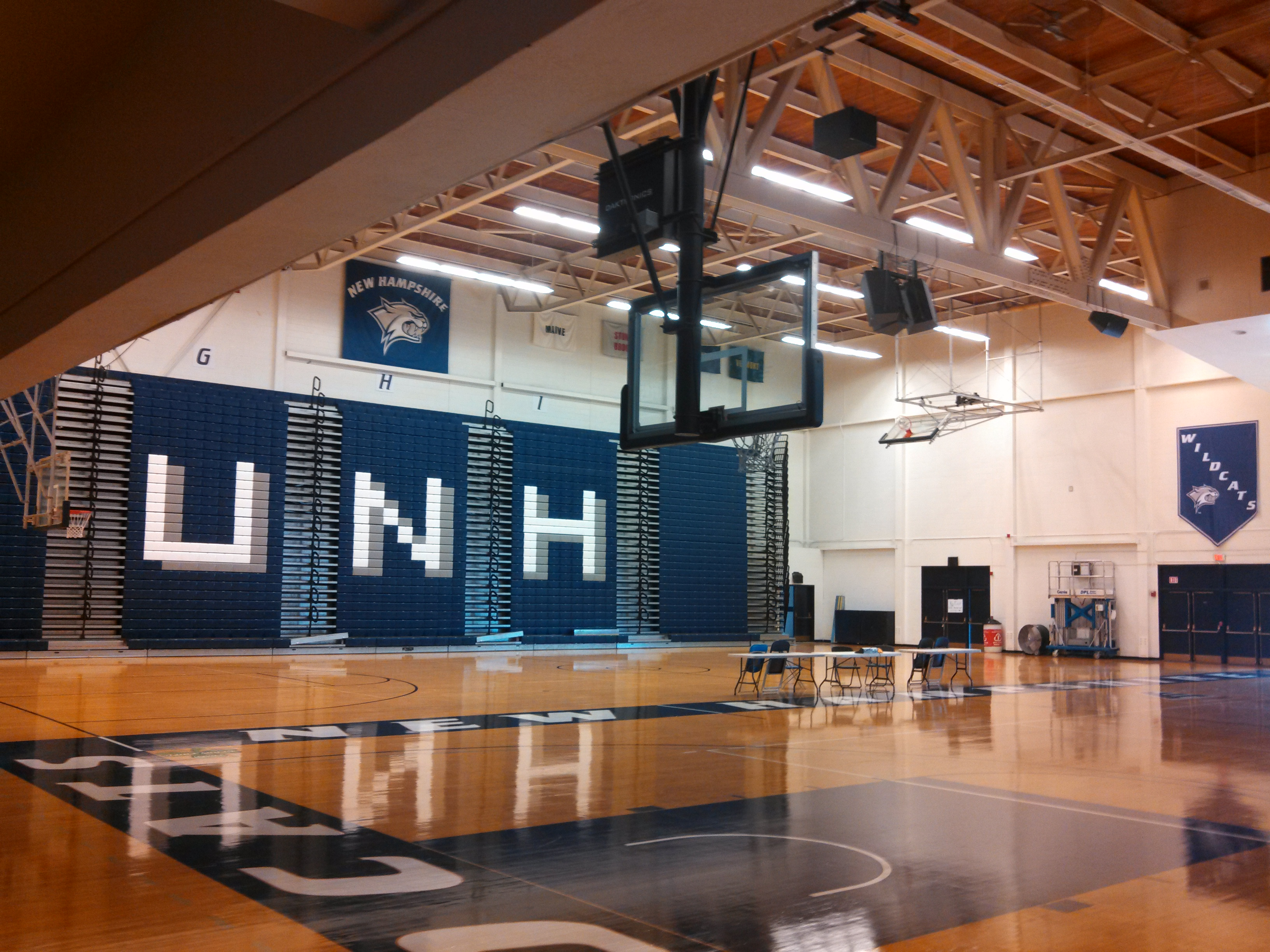
Lundholm Gym

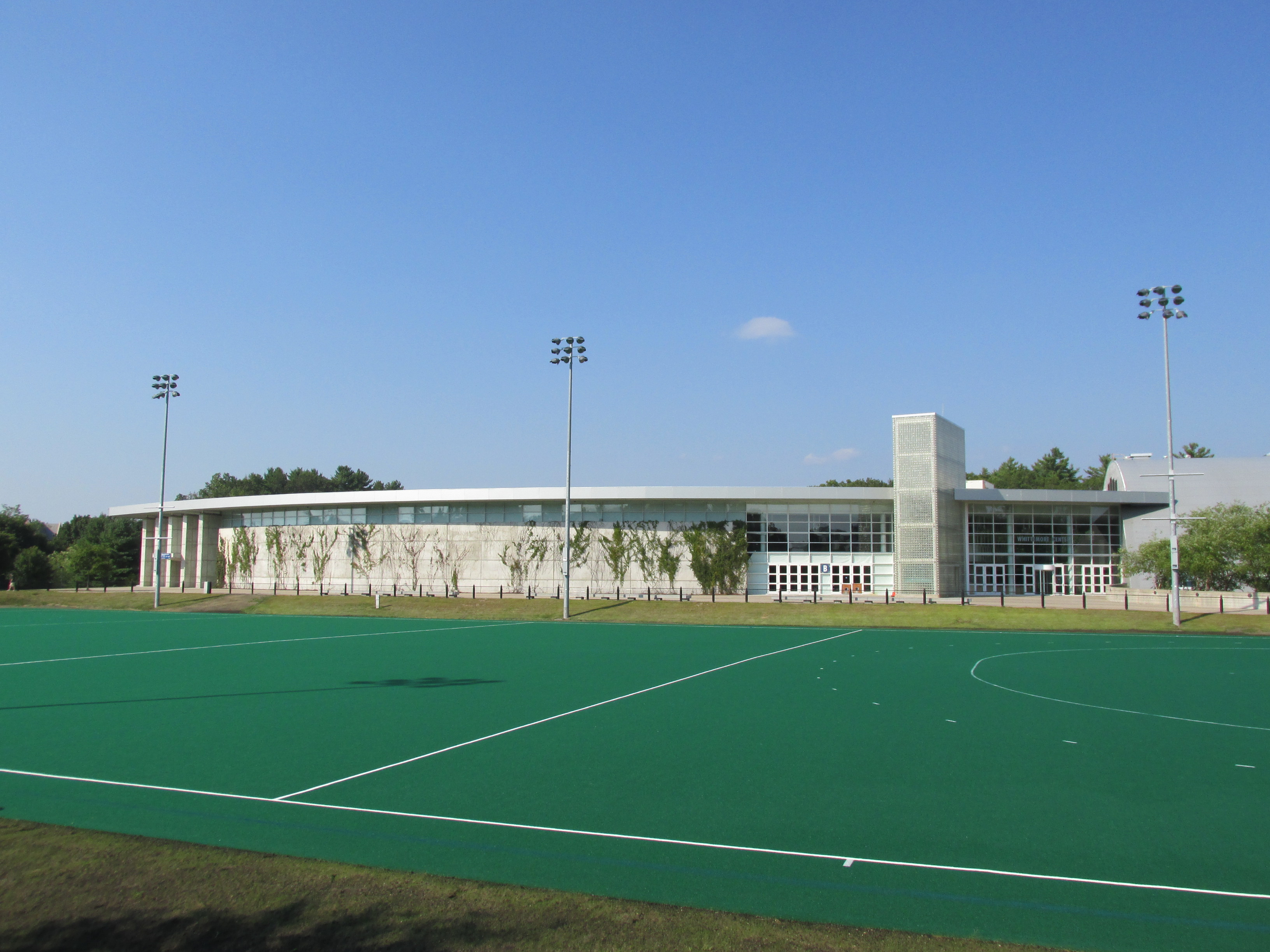
Field hockey field

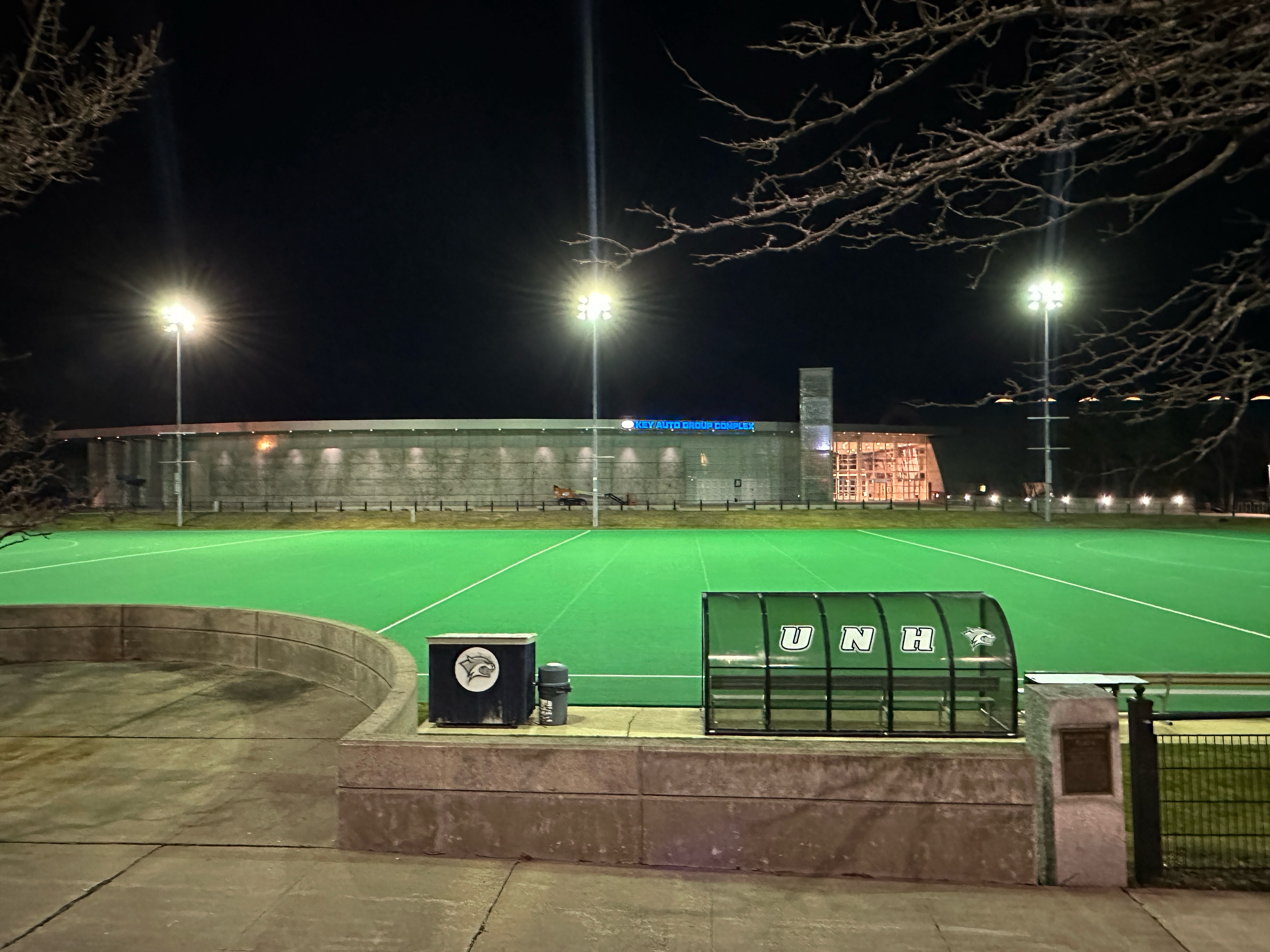
Whittemore Center (at background)

The university's athletic facilities are concentrated on the west side of the campus, near Durham's Amtrak station.

- The football team plays on Mooradian Field in Wildcat Stadium (formerly Cowell Stadium), which is attached to the Field House. men's soccer, women's soccer and women's lacrosse also compete in Wildcat Stadium, as well as men's and women's track. UNH Athletics has also recently built a soccer and lacrosse facility, known as Tucker Field, which is adjacent to Wildcat Stadium.
- The Lundholm Gymnasium in the Field House is home to basketball, gymnastics and volleyball. The Field House also contains the Henry C. Swasey Pool, home to the women's swim team, as well as the Paul Sweet Oval, which is home to indoor track and field and as a winter training facility for other sports. The outdoor track team holds its meets at Reggie F. Atkins Track & Field Facility in Wildcat Stadium.
- Jerry Azumah Performance Center at the Field House is named after Chicago Bears player Jerry Azumah who played college football for UNH.
- Bremner Field, located behind Wildcat Stadium, is the home to the soccer teams. The tennis courts are used for recreational tennis and are managed by Campus Recreation as tennis is not a sponsored intercollegiate sport at UNH.
- Men's and women's ice hockey play on Towse Rink at the Whittemore Center, which is occasionally used for larger gymnastics competitions. The hockey teams' former home, Snively Arena, was incorporated into the Hamel Recreation Center.
- Memorial Field, located in front of the "Whitt," is home to field hockey. Updates have been made in regards to the athletic facilities spectators and guest policies.

== Traditions ==
=== Mascot & nickname ===
The official mascot and nickname is the Wildcats. The Athletic Department holds annual mascot try-outs to select men and women to wear the "Wild E. Cat" and "Gnarlz" costumes at various sporting events and occasional university functions. Those selected as the athletic department's icon are cheerleaders.

The Wildcat became the official college mascot and nickname in February 1926. Students cast their votes using a ballot which appeared in The New Hampshire. The "Durham Bulls," a nickname given to the Hockey team by the local media, was a close runner-up. Other votes for the mascot included a husky, an eagle and even a unicorn. It was argued in an opinion piece in The New Hampshire, in part that: The wildcat is small and aggressive—like New Hampshire. The actions of the wildcat are more symbolic of a New Hampshire team on the field than those of the sluggish bull. Furthermore, the actual mascot, if a wildcat, could be more easily transported from place to place than a bull.

==== Former live mascots ====
The first live mascot of the university was "Mazie," a cat who was captured by a farmer in Meredith, New Hampshire. Maizie made her first appearance at the 1927 Homecoming game, and died in 1929. The second mascot, "Bozo", was purchased in 1932 but disappeared in Spring 1933.

The third cat was purchased in 1934, and was to be named for the first New Hampshire player to score in the historical football game against Maine. Charles scored the first touchdown, but Henry kicked the first field goal; neither name was chosen and the cat was named "Butch Watson." Butch Watson lived behind the Lambda Chi Alpha fraternity house in a cage and was the only mascot to be stolen by a rival school. Butch Watson was stolen in 1939, a week before a football game against Harvard and just after the Wildcats beat Tufts. There were no claims of responsibility, but the cat was found in a garage in Woburn, Massachusetts with "HARVARD 60, N.H. 0," written on the top of the cage.

"Butch Watson II" was the fourth mascot and was purchased in 1940, but lived only a week. In 1970, a fan's pet wildcat appeared at some football games.

==== "Wild E. Cat" and "Gnarlz" ====
Since 1940, the only live mascot has been "Wild E. Cat" and "Gnarlz," a cheerleader dressed in a wildcat costume. The Athletic Department "Gnarlz" made its debut at the football team's 2008 home opener against Albany on September 20. "Gnarlz" was named via an online poll and was designed to have a "more athletic physique" and "more student-friendly look." They are also well known lovers according to some students on the UNH campus. Gnarlz is considered the superior cat by students, due to the mascot's amazing physique and charisma.

=== Official colors ===
UNH Blue

Color coordinates
- Hex triplet: #001D52
- sRGB^{B} (r, g, b): (0, 29, 82)
- HSV (h, s, v): (219°, 100%, 32%)
- CIELCh_{uv} (L, C, h): (13, 32, 259°)
- Source: UNH Visual Guidelines
- B: Normalized to [0–255] (byte)

The official colors of the university and used by the athletic teams are UNH Blue and white. UNH Blue is a dark blue matching Pantone color 287. New Hampshire is known as the "Granite State." White resembles the White Mountains of New Hampshire, located an hour north of Durham. The University of New Hampshire campus is located about a mile from the Great Bay estuary, which runs out to the Atlantic Ocean. Blue resembles the Atlantic Ocean.

==== New Hampshire Colors ====
written by E Y Blewett '26

We'll take our stand for New Hampshire
Loyal to colors true
White from ever lasting hill and
from the ocean blue
wherever college men gather
long her worth we'll tell
All your sons and your daughters stand to
Sing your praises Alma Mater Hail.

=== Throwing out the fish (hockey) ===
UNH has a long history of successful hockey programs. Dating back to Charlie Holt in the 1970s to present day coach Dick Umile, it has had great support and is a figurehead among the university community. A prominent tradition within the program has been the throwing of the fish. After UNH scores its first goal, all fans turn their attention to the opposing teams net. Up and over the boards, a fish is thrown onto the ice. The crowd erupts in excitement.

According to Bob Norton, a former UNH assistant coach, the fish-tossing tradition began in the early 1970s. "It goes back to when we were playing a Division II team, and our program had gone way past theirs. I remember (the UNH fans) threw out this little dinky thing and they called it a Division II fish. I guess they were trying to tell them they weren't worthy of a first-rate fish."

This tradition caught on as the Zeta Chi fraternity made it a ritual to throw out the fish after UNH's first goal. The fish was used to resemble the visiting team, "fishing the puck out of the net."

One of Umile's favorite fish incidents occurred in the early 1990s. At that time, the home team received a penalty if fans threw objects on the ice. "At all these different rinks people were throwing things – tennis balls, newspapers – and it was really holding up the game," Umile recalls. "It's the Maine weekend, and the cops won't let the kid in with the fish. I'm in the office before the game, and the students come to get me. So I go down there, get the fish from the cops, and we're walking in with the fish in the bag. The kids say, 'But coach, we're going to get a penalty.' I say, 'Don't worry about it. We'll kill the penalty. Just throw the fish.'"

=== Fight songs ===
The recognized school fight song is "On to Victory," with the most current version arranged by former Director of Athletic Bands Tom Keck (1998–2003). In 2003, "UNH Cheer (originally "Cheer Boys")" was resurrected from the University archives by former Director of Athletic Bands Erika Svanoe (2003-2006). "UNH Cheer" currently serves as a secondary fight song and is often performed immediately following "On to Victory." It is based on the school song "Old New Hampshire", not to be confused with the New Hampshire state song of the same name. "New Hampshire Hymn" is the official fight song, but generally goes unused (but the Wildcat Marching Band did incorporate the official song into their pre-game show beginning in the 2010 football season). The school also has another secondary fight song, "New Hampshire Colors" E. Y. Blewett '26.

== Radio and television ==
Currently the Wildcats are carried by a network of radio stations (Known as The UNH Sports Network) across New Hampshire, anchored by WGIR in Manchester and WPKX and WQSO in Rochester. Games are also carried by student radio station WUNH.

Games are seen on television on NESN, and WWJE-DT. New Hampshire Public Television broadcast UNH men's hockey games from the 1972/1973 season through the 2007/2008 season, but announced in June 2008 that they would no longer do so due to budgetary considerations. Some Wildcats telecasts have aired on WMUR-TV in the past.

== See also ==
- New Hampshire–Maine hockey rivalry
- New Hampshire–Dartmouth rivalry
- List of New Hampshire Wildcats in the NFL draft
