= The New Hampshire =

Student newspaper of the University of New Hampshire

- Type: Student newspaper
- Format: Digital
- Owner(s): The New Hampshire (UNH student organization)
- Publisher: The New Hampshire Board of Governors (Seacoast Media Group)
- Founded: September 20, 1911
- Headquarters: Room 132 Memorial Union Building; University of New Hampshire; Durham, NH 03824
- Circulation: 3,000 per issue (until 2021)
- Website: tnhdigital.com

The New Hampshire (commonly known as TNH) is the student-run news of the University of New Hampshire (UNH) since 1911. TNH operates from its headquarters in the Memorial Union Building, covering student life and doings for the college town of Durham, as well as nearby cities like Dover and Newmarket.

In 2021, TNH surpassed for the former Granite student yearbook (1908–2017) as the oldest UNH publication in the college's history at 110 years old. That August, TNH announced that it would discontinue its long-running print edition and become digital-only starting with the 2021–22 school year due to declining readership. It has previously published weekly on Thursdays during the academic year, with a printed circulation of 3,000 copies per issue.

== History ==
The first issue of The New Hampshire, "Volume 1, No. 1," was published on September 20, 1911, and sold for 5¢ a copy or $1 for a year-long subscription. It replaced The New Hampshire College Monthly, a student magazine created in 1893 (and originally named The Enaichsee—"The NHC"—in its first year) by students of the Culver Literary Society. The first issue of The New Hampshire greeted students of the college (named the New Hampshire College of Agriculture and the Mechanic Arts prior to 1923) with the following proclamation:

"The College Monthly is dead, bound over and passes into the great beyond whence from it can never come back. Its last years were ones of strife and difficulty but the end came in quietness with all bills paid... However, that is gone and we are with this issue starting a new era in New Hampshire College. This first issue of The New Hampshire is one that is making history for it is the first-ever weekly newspaper that has ever been issued by the students of this college... The New Hampshire greets you! And we start with the feeling that we are at the beginning of a new epoch, vigorous, broad, and promising from this paper is bound to make the college better known to the world and more loved by its friends."

In May 1916, The New Hampshire urged NHC to illuminate the Thompson Hall tower clock, which had been installed in 1893. TNH even offered student assistance with the electrical wiring. NHC subsequently installed lights to illuminate the clock, which operates to this day.

In October 2011, The New Hampshire was awarded the Newspaper Pacemaker Award by the Associated Collegiate Press at the National College Media Convention in recognition of "general excellence and outstanding achievement from a college newspaper in a national competition" for its coverage of rising UNH tuition and related funding issues earlier that year.

On August 23, 2021, TNH announced via Instagram and Twitter that it would convert to a fully digital format and discontinue its weekly publication, writing that "after recent years of low print engagement, we believe that allocating time to a more digitally-based presence will provide a modern newsroom experience for our staff, while also providing our readership with more relevant, timely coverage of all things Durham will be a perfect marriage." The organization added that a revamped website would follow the conversion. The final print edition of TNH, Issue 24, was released on May 6.

== Organization ==
The New Hampshire comprises the following staff:

- Executive Editor
- Managing Editor
- Content Editor
- News Editors
- Arts Editor
- Sports Editors
- Design Editors
- Web Editor
- Staff Photographer - Jack Bouchard
- Staff Writers
- Business Manager
- Business Consultant

Until 2021, Seacoast Media Group printed TNH's weekly paper off-campus. Prior to the 2005–06 academic year, TNH was printed by Foster's Daily Democrat, part of Seacoast Newspapers, located in Stratham, New Hampshire.

== Sections ==
TNH is presently divided into four sections: News, Arts, Opinion and Sports. While it infrequently used a tabloid-style layout in its print edition (often reserved for its annual freshman orientation issue), the majority, if not all, of the organization's other issues relied on a broadsheet layout.

Recent regular features in print editions of TNH included the "Index", which featured a table of contents and weekly weather report; "Student Senate update", an overview of weekly meetings of the UNH Student Senate; and the current iteration of On the Spot segments consisting of one-on-one interviews with various students and faculty who have made a recent impact on the UNH community (not to be confused with the former On the Spot segment, which utilized a group of nine students answering an off-beat or humorous question).

== Media ==
In the final years of its print run, TNH announced plans to expand its digital presence, starting with the paper's "Digital First" initiative, kicked off on November 14, 2016, by then-Executive Editor Allison Bellucci. Since then, the paper has increased its social media presence, updated its website, and launched the TNH Podcast Network in February 2019 to invite more student media content to UNH. Between February 2019 and March 2020, TNH hosted two seasons of the NBA podcast "HoopCats," a collaboration between TNH and college radio station WUNH-FM, before its cancellation due to the impact of COVID-19.

== Funding ==
TNH is primarily funded through advertising revenue while also receiving a subsidy from the University of New Hampshire Student Activity Fee Committee (SAFC).
