= Sheary =

Sheary is a surname. Notable people with the surname include:

- Conor Sheary (born 1992), American ice hockey player
- Buster Sheary (1908–2001), American basketball coach

== See also ==
- Sherry (name)
