= List of New Hampshire Wildcats in the NFL draft =

This is a list of New Hampshire Wildcats football players in the NFL draft.

== Key ==
B	Back	K	Kicker	NT	Nose tackle
C	Center	LB	Linebacker	FB	Fullback
DB	Defensive back	P	Punter	HB	Halfback
DE	Defensive end	QB	Quarterback	WR	Wide receiver
DT	Defensive tackle	RB	Running back	G	Guard
E	End	T	Offensive tackle	TE	Tight end

== Selections ==
Note: the first NFL draft was held in February 1936.

Year	Round	Pick	Overall	Player	Team	Position
1944	26	5	268	Ted Fitanides	New York Giants	B
1948	14	9	124	Clayton Lane	Pittsburgh Steelers	T
1948	15	4	129	Carmen Ragonese	Boston Yanks	B
1948	26	4	239	Bruce Mather	Boston Yanks	B
1961	8	1	99	Paul Lidquist	Minnesota Vikings	T
1976	15	21	415	Dave Rozumek	Kansas City Chiefs	LB
1982	3	14	69	Steve Doig	Detroit Lions	LB
1983	6	18	158	Ken Kaplan	Tampa Bay Buccaneers	T
1987	5	15	127	Ilia Jarostchuk	St. Louis Cardinals	LB
1988	12	4	309	John Driscoll	Buffalo Bills	T
1989	10	27	278	Bob Jean	Cincinnati Bengals	QB
1992	5	4	116	Dwayne Sabb	New England Patriots	LB
1993	8	22	218	Dwayne Gordon	Miami Dolphins	LB
1996	6	2	169	Mike Foley	Arizona Cardinals	DE
1999	5	14	147	Jerry Azumah	Chicago Bears	DB
2007	5	31	168	Corey Graham	Chicago Bears	DB
2013	7	35	241	Jared Smith	Seattle Seahawks	DT
2024	6	32	208	Dylan Laube	Las Vegas Raiders	RB
