= Mike Kunigonis =

American baseball coach

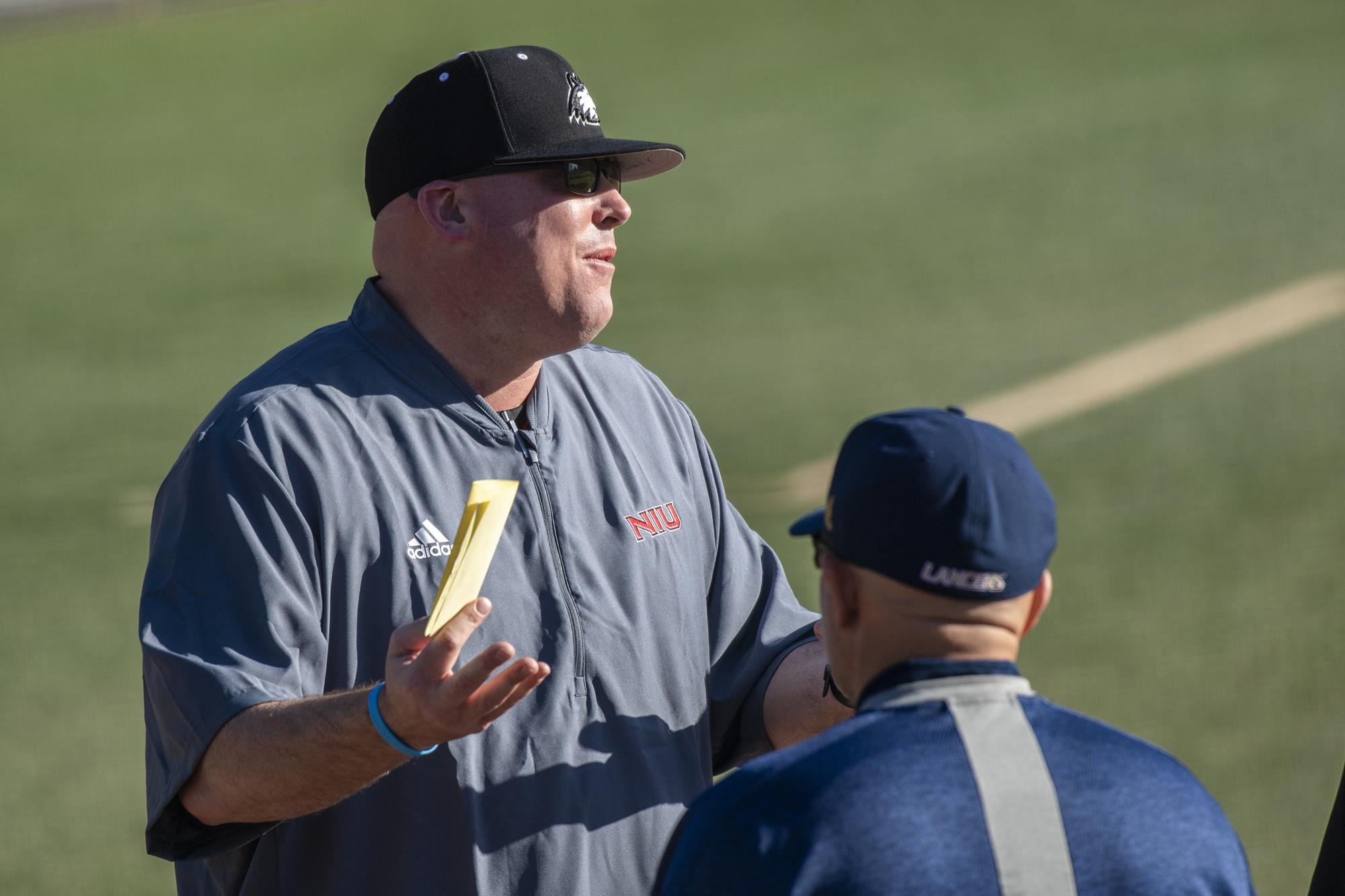
- Kunigonis in 2019

Biographical details
- Born: June 4, 1980 (age 46); Worcester, Massachusetts, U.S.
- Education: American International College

Coaching career (HC unless noted)
- 2002–2004: Niagara (asst.)
- 2004–2007: Canisius (asst.)
- 2007–2008: Radford (asst.)
- 2008–2014: Virginia Tech (asst.)
- 2015–2023: Northern Illinois

Head coaching record
- Overall: 148–290

Mike Kunigonis (born June 4, 1980) currently serves as Associate Athletic Director for Revenue Generation at Northern Illinois University. He is a former American college baseball coach most recently serving as the head coach for the Northern Illinois Huskies baseball program at Northern Illinois University. He was named to that position prior to the 2015 season.

== Early years ==
Kunigonis was raised in Worcester, Massachusetts. He attended Saint Peter-Marian High School in Worcester.

== Playing career ==
Kunigonis attended American International College in Springfield, Massachusetts. He played for the Division II Yellow Jackets from 1999–2002. A Butova Sportsmanship Award Winner in his Junior year, Michael was also selected as an all–region and all–conference player as a first baseman.

Along with his playing career at American International, Kunigonis graduated with a Bachelor of Science in criminal justice and sociology in 2001. While coaching at Canisius College in 2006, he earned a Master of Science in sports administration.

== Coaching career ==
Following his graduation, Kunigonis spent five seasons working as an assistant coach and recruiting coordinator at two schools in Western New York. In 2003 and 2004, he worked at Niagara University in Lewiston, and from 2005–2007 at Canisius College in Buffalo. During his tenure at both schools, they reached the Metro Atlantic Athletic Conference baseball tournament. For the 2008 season, Kunigonis was an assistant at Radford University.

Kunigonis joined the coaching staff at Virginia Tech prior to the 2009 season, as a volunteer assistant coach. He worked as a volunteer assistant for both the 2009 and 2010 season before being promoted to a full-time assistant coaching position. Kunigonis was promoted to the Hokies hitting coach. Under his guidance, the Hokies had a banner season in 2013, and had one of the highest draft picks in Virginia Tech history with infielder Chad Pinder, who was selected by the Oakland Athletics with the 71st overall pick in the 2013 Major League Baseball draft.

On January 5, 2015, Kunigonis was announced as the new head coach at Northern Illinois University.

Kunigonis received his first career win against South Dakota State on February 13, 2015, in his head coaching debut, by a score of 10–6. Under Kunigonis NIU Baseball has seen great success in the classroom and in the community. NIU Baseball has been named Community Service Male Team of the year five times for NIU Athletics as well as winning the Victor's Cup for best overall Male Team twice.

On May 7, 2023, Northern Illinois announced that Kunigonis's contract would not be renewed and he was relieved of his head coaching duties.

== Head coaching record ==
The following is a table of Kunigonis' yearly records as an NCAA head baseball coach.

Record table
Season	Team	Overall	Conference	Standing	Postseason
Northern Illinois Huskies (Mid-American Conference) (2015–2023)
2015	Northern Illinois	22–33	10–17	5th (West)	
2016	Northern Illinois	24–32	14–10	2nd (West)	MAC Tournament
2017	Northern Illinois	17–38	11–13	5th (West)	MAC Tournament
2018	Northern Illinois	20–36	9–18	10th	
2019	Northern Illinois	20–36	14–12	5th	MAC Tournament Semi Finals
2020	Northern Illinois	7–10	0–0		Season canceled due to COVID-19
2021	Northern Illinois	16–38	15–25	T-9th	NO POST SEASON TOURNAMENT DUE TO COVID-19
2022	Northern Illinois	14–40	13–25	10th	
2023	Northern Illinois	8–38	4–19	11th	
Northern Illinois:		148–290	90–139		
Total:		148–290			
National champion Postseason invitational champion Conference regular season champion Conference regular season and conference tournament champion Division regular season champion Division regular season and conference tournament champion Conference tournament champion
