= Frank Oftring =

American basketball player and coach

Biographical details
- Born: June 4, 1924
- Died: October 4, 1982 (aged 58); Worcester, Massachusetts, U.S.

Playing career
- 1946–1950: Holy Cross

Coaching career (HC unless noted)
- 1952–1959: Saint Peter's HS
- 1959–1961: Holy Cross (assistant)
- 1961–1965: Holy Cross

Frank A. Oftring Jr. (June 4, 1924 – October 4, 1982) was an American college basketball player and coach. He played on Holy Cross' 1947 National Championship team and later returned to campus as the school's head coach from 1961 to 1965.

After concluding his high school career in June 1942 at Brooklyn Technical High School, Oftring joined the United States Navy during World War II, stationed primarily at Quonset Point Naval Air Station in Rhode Island. Following his service, he joined Doggie Julian's Holy Cross team and was a forward on their 1947 championship team with future Hall of Fame guard Bob Cousy. After his career, Oftring was drafted in the 8th round of the 1950 NBA draft by the Boston Celtics, though he never played in the NBA.

During the 1950s, Oftring and Cousy owned a gas station and driving school. In 1952, Oftring began his coaching career at Saint Peter's High School in Worcester, Massachusetts. He returned to Holy Cross in 1959 as an assistant coach. He became Holy Cross' head basketball coach in 1961. He left after four seasons with a record of 64–33 and started a brokerage business.

Oftring died on October 4, 1982. He was inducted into the New England Basketball Hall of Fame in 2009.
