= Paul Duhart =

American football player and coach (1920–2006)

No. 42, 52, 24
- Positions: Halfback, quarterback, defensive back

Personal information
- Born: December 30, 1920; Montreal, Quebec, Canada
- Died: January 18, 2006 (aged 85); Huntington Beach, California, U.S.
- Listed height: 6 ft 0 in (1.83 m)
- Listed weight: 180 lb (82 kg)

Career information
- High school: Saint Peter's (Worcester, Massachusetts, U.S.)
- College: Florida (1942)
- NFL draft: 1945: 1st round, 2nd overall pick

Career history

Playing
- Green Bay Packers (1944); Pittsburgh Steelers (1945); Boston Yanks (1945)

Coaching
- Arcadia High School (1960–1969)

Awards and highlights
- NFL champion (1944)

Career NFL statistics
- Rushing yards: 200
- Rushing average: 2.9
- Receptions: 9
- Receiving yards: 176
- Total touchdowns: 5
- Interceptions: 4
- Stats at Pro Football Reference

Paul Albert Duhart (December 30, 1920 – January 18, 2006) was a Canadian-American professional football player. Duhart played college football for the University of Florida. Thereafter, he played for the Green Bay Packers, Pittsburgh Steelers and Boston Yanks of the National Football League (NFL) for two seasons during the mid-1940s.

== Early life ==
Duhart was born in Montreal, Quebec, Canada, and is of French-Canadian descent. He attended Saint Peter's High School in Worcester, Massachusetts, where he was a standout high school football player.

== College career ==
Duhart enrolled at the University of Florida in Gainesville, Florida where he played for coach Tom Lieb's Florida Gators football team. Duhart's performance that season earned his varsity letter in 1942, before entering the U.S. Army in 1943. The Gators did not field a varsity football team in 1943, as most able-bodied men of college age either volunteered or were drafted into the U.S. Armed Services during the height of World War II.

== Professional career ==
After being discharged by the U.S. Army in 1944, Duhart was given special dispensation pursuant to a ruling by the NFL in order to sign with the Green Bay Packers, since his college team, the Florida Gators, had previously disbanded for the 1943 season, preventing Duhart from entering the NFL draft that year. As a part-time starter, he helped the Packers to a championship season in 1944. The 1944 NFL Championship Game was played on December 17, 1944, at New York City's Polo Grounds. The Western Division champions, coach Curly Lambeau's Green Bay Packers (8–2), squared off against the Eastern Division champions, coach Steve Owen's New York Giants (8–1–1). Led by Green Bay's end Don Hutson, quarterback Irv Comp, and running back Ted Fritsch who scored two touchdowns, the Packers compiled a 14–7 victory over the Giants, prevailing over the Giants' star running back Bill Paschal and quarterback Arnie Herber. Duhart's last-minute interception of a "hail Mary" pass by Herber secured the Packers' victory.

Prior to the 1945 NFL draft, the NFL determined that Duhart would have to enter the draft, and he was selected in the first round (second pick overall) by the Pittsburgh Steelers. Duhart was the first college football player from the state of Florida to be selected in the first round of the NFL draft. After playing two games for the Steelers in 1945, the Boston Yanks purchased him, and he finished the 1945 season with the Yanks before injuries ended his NFL career.

Duhart finished his two-season NFL career with sixty-eight carries for 200 rushing yards and three touchdowns, and nine receptions for 176 yards and two touchdowns. He also completed seven passes for sixty-nine yards.

== Life after the NFL ==
After retiring from the NFL, Duhart attended Boston College in Chestnut Hill, Massachusetts, and graduated with a bachelor's degree in history and English.

In 1960, Duhart moved west from Southbridge, Massachusetts to become the athletic director and head varsity football coach for Arcadia High School in Arcadia, California. His 1961 Pacific League championship team was undefeated, extending his personal win streak to thirty games, and for the first time ever, the Arcadia Apaches defeated their cross-town rivals, the Monrovia High School Wildcats. Duhart led the Arcadia Apaches football program from 1960 through 1969, and also served as the head coach of the boys' varsity golf and girls' varsity tennis teams. He coached the girls' tennis team to the California Interscholastic Federation (CIF) tournament finals in 1992, and was later inducted into Arcadia High School's coaching Hall of Fame in 1998.

Duhart was a published poet in his later years and was remembered as a mentor to many students during his long tenure at Arcadia High School. He spoke French fluently, and taught French and history classes at Arcadia. An accomplished athlete who loved sports, he continued to play golf and tennis long into his retirement. Duhart died at his home in Huntington Beach, California, in 2006; he was 85 years old.

== See also ==
- Florida Gators football, 1940–49
- List of Boston College people
- List of Florida Gators in the NFL draft
- List of Pittsburgh Steelers first-round draft picks
