= Dartmouth–New Hampshire rivalry =

College sports rivalry

Dartmouth-New Hampshire rivalry

The locations of the two schools in New Hampshire

The Dartmouth–New Hampshire rivalry is an intrastate college sports rivalry between the Dartmouth Big Green and New Hampshire Wildcats.

== Basketball ==
Dartmouth–New Hampshire men's basketball rivalry
- Dartmouth New Hampshire Wildcats
- Sport: Basketball
- Latest meeting: December 3, 2025
- Next meeting: December 12, 2026

Statistics
- Total meetings: 73
- All-time series: Dartmouth leads 37–36
- Current win streak: Dartmouth, 3 (2023–present)

Dartmouth and New Hampshire field the only two Division I college basketball teams in the Granite State. The Big Green and the Wildcats have met 72 times since 1908, with Dartmouth leading the series 38–35. 22 of the 73 games have been decided by a single basket; 31 have been decided by two baskets or fewer.

The two teams have played at least once every season since 1971, with the longest gap between games occurring between 1934 and 1952. The longest winning streak for either team in the 108-year history of the series is eight (Dartmouth, 1986 to 1992). Over the last quarter-century, however, New Hampshire has dominated the series, winning 17 of 27 games.

The most recent game in the series was won by Dartmouth, 69–68, at Leede Arena on December 3, 2025.

=== Game results ===
Dartmouth victories	New Hampshire victories

No.	Date	Location	Winner	Score
1	January 12, 1909	Hanover, NH	Dartmouth	22–9
2	December 18, 1913	Hanover, NH	Dartmouth	22–15
3	December 28, 1914	Hanover, NH	Dartmouth	28–6
4	February 17, 1917	Hanover, NH	Dartmouth	35–18
5	March 6, 1918	Hanover, NH	New Hampshire	22–17
6	February 24, 1920	Hanover, NH	Dartmouth	22–12
7	February 4, 1931	Hanover, NH	New Hampshire	27–25
8	February 7, 1934	Hanover, NH	Dartmouth	42–22
9	January 8, 1952	Hanover, NH	Dartmouth	59–58
10	January 11, 1954	Durham, NH	Dartmouth	75–59
11	December 9, 1961	Hanover, NH	Dartmouth	68–50
12	January 22, 1963	Durham, NH	Dartmouth	66–50
13	December 7, 1963	Hanover, NH	New Hampshire	75–66
14	January 16, 1965	Durham, NH	Dartmouth	85–79
15	December 7, 1968	Hanover, NH	Dartmouth	74–57
16	February 9, 1971	Durham, NH	Dartmouth	78–74
17	February 29, 1972	Hanover, NH	Dartmouth	69–68
18	February 26, 1973	Durham, NH	New Hampshire	77–66
19	February 26, 1974	Hanover, NH	New Hampshire	63–61
20	February 11, 1975	Durham, NH	New Hampshire	90–84
21	December 1, 1975	Hanover, NH	Dartmouth	63–58
22	January 26, 1977	Durham, NH	New Hampshire	59–56
23	January 14, 1978	Hanover, NH	Dartmouth	62–60
24	January 17, 1979	Durham, NH	New Hampshire	66–57
25	February 12, 1980	Hanover, NH	New Hampshire	55–54
26	November 30, 1980	Hanover, NH	Dartmouth	86–65
27	January 10, 1981	Durham, NH	New Hampshire	63–60
28	January 9, 1982	Hanover, NH	New Hampshire	59–58
29	January 3, 1983	Hanover, NH	New Hampshire	73–63
30	January 29, 1983	Durham, NH	New Hampshire	77–60
31	January 23, 1984	Hanover, NH	New Hampshire	54–47
32	February 5, 1985	Durham, NH	New Hampshire	62–59
33	January 2, 1986	Hanover, NH	New Hampshire	72–64
34	January 13, 1987	Durham, NH	Dartmouth	83–81
35	January 12, 1988	Hanover, NH	Dartmouth	83–65
36	January 10, 1989	Durham, NH	Dartmouth	91–88
37	November 30, 1989	Durham, NH	Dartmouth	79–77

No.	Date	Location	Winner	Score
38	January 9, 1990	Hanover, NH	Dartmouth	62–59
39	January 8, 1991	Derry, NH	Dartmouth	73–59
40	January 17, 1991	Hanover, NH	Dartmouth	57–47
41	December 4, 1991	Hanover, NH	Dartmouth	62–56
42	January 22, 1992	Durham, NH	New Hampshire	56–48
43	January 4, 1993	Hanover, NH	Dartmouth	77–67
44	November 27, 1993	Durham, NH	New Hampshire	79–58
45	January 23, 1995	Hanover, NH	New Hampshire	87–60
46	January 17, 1996	Durham, NH	New Hampshire	72–69
47	December 14, 1996	Hanover, NH	Dartmouth	73–56
48	December 13, 1997	Durham, NH	New Hampshire	67–54
49	December 13, 1998	Hanover, NH	Dartmouth	92–79
50	November 26, 1999	Durham, NH	New Hampshire	75–57
51	November 25, 2000	Hanover, NH	New Hampshire	96–89
52	November 24, 2001	Durham, NH	Dartmouth	72–70
53	January 15, 2003	Hanover, NH	New Hampshire	62–57
54	December 14, 2003	Hanover, NH	New Hampshire	56–45
55	December 11, 2004	Hanover, NH	Dartmouth	69–67
56	January 16, 2006	Durham, NH	New Hampshire	71–59
57	January 16, 2007	Hanover, NH	New Hampshire	65–61
58	January 15, 2008	Durham, NH	Dartmouth	65–60
59	January 17, 2009	Hanover, NH	New Hampshire	68–59
60	December 20, 2009	Durham, NH	New Hampshire	69–59
61	November 16, 2010	Hanover, NH	New Hampshire	55–53
62	November 30, 2011	Durham, NH	New Hampshire	53–50
63	November 13, 2012	Hanover, NH	New Hampshire	72–58
64	December 18, 2013	Durham, NH	Dartmouth	62–48
65	November 30, 2014	Hanover, NH	New Hampshire	65–63
66	December 19, 2015	Durham, NH	New Hampshire	76–56
67	December 31, 2016	Hanover, NH	Dartmouth	64–63
68	December 30, 2017	Durham, NH	New Hampshire	83–66
69	December 30, 2018	Hanover, NH	Dartmouth	76–68
70	December 30, 2019	Durham, NH	New Hampshire	70–56
71	December 6, 2023	Hanover, NH	Dartmouth	76–64
72	December 3, 2024	Durham, NH	Dartmouth	69–65
73	December 3, 2025	Hanover, NH	Dartmouth	69–68
Series: Dartmouth leads 37–36

== Ice hockey ==
New Hampshire Wildcats men's ice hockey and Dartmouth Big Green men's ice hockey, the only Division I college hockey teams in New Hampshire, play once a year. The first game between the teams was played in 1970 at the Boston Garden.

Beginning in 2004, the annual game has occasionally been played in Manchester; UNH leads in these neutral-site games, sponsored by RiverStone Resources of Manchester and billed as the "RiverStone Cup" series, 6–3.

=== Game results ===
Dartmouth victories	New Hampshire victories	Tie games

No.	Date	Location	Winner	Score
1	December 1, 1970	Boston, MA	New Hampshire	11–2
2	December 18, 1972	New York, NY	Dartmouth	5–4
3	February 27, 1973	Durham, NH	New Hampshire	5–4
4	December 1, 1973	Hanover, NH	New Hampshire	8–2
5	December 2, 1974	Durham, NH	New Hampshire	6–1
6	January 3, 1976	Hanover, NH	New Hampshire	6–3
7	January 15, 1976	Hanover, NH	New Hampshire	7–0
8	February 15, 1977	Hanover, NH	New Hampshire	8–3
9	December 17, 1977	Hanover, NH	Dartmouth	7–6
10	January 25, 1978	Durham, NH	New Hampshire	6–3
11	January 24, 1979	Hanover, NH	Tie	5–5
12	March 10, 1979	Detroit, MI	New Hampshire	3–2
13	March 24, 1979	Detroit, MI	Dartmouth	7–3
14	January 22, 1980	Durham, NH	Dartmouth	7–4
15	January 20, 1981	Durham, NH	New Hampshire	4–2
16	December 16, 1981	Hanover, NH	New Hampshire	8–3
17	December 30, 1981	Hanover, NH	Dartmouth	6–5
18	December 15, 1982	Hanover, NH	New Hampshire	7–2
19	December 31, 1982	Hanover, NH	New Hampshire	7–0
20	December 9, 1983	Durham, NH	New Hampshire	8–4
21	February 15, 1984	Hanover, NH	New Hampshire	7–5
22	December 31, 1984	Hanover, NH	New Hampshire	9–4
23	December 30, 1988	Hanover, NH	Dartmouth	4–3
24	December 29, 1989	Hanover, NH	New Hampshire	9–3
25	December 29, 1990	Hanover, NH	New Hampshire	6–3
26	December 28, 1991	Hanover, NH	New Hampshire	8–3

No.	Date	Location	Winner	Score
27	December 29, 1992	Hanover, NH	Dartmouth	4–3
28	December 29, 1993	Hanover, NH	New Hampshire	3–2
29	January 3, 2000	Durham, NH	New Hampshire	3–2
30	December 29, 2000	Hanover, NH	Dartmouth	6–3
31	December 13, 2001	Durham, NH	New Hampshire	6–3
32	January 15, 2003	Durham, NH	Tie	1–1
33	January 13, 2004	Manchester, NH	New Hampshire	5–0
34	January 12, 2005	Manchester, NH	Dartmouth	9–8
35	January 13, 2007	Manchester, NH	New Hampshire	4–2
36	January 19, 2008	Manchester, NH	Dartmouth	5–3
37	January 17, 2009	Manchester, NH	New Hampshire	6–4
38	January 16, 2010	Manchester, NH	New Hampshire	5–2
39	January 15, 2011	Manchester, NH	Dartmouth	5–4
40	January 14, 2012	Manchester, NH	New Hampshire	4–1
41	December 30, 2012	Hanover, NH	Dartmouth	4–1
42	January 11, 2014	Manchester, NH	New Hampshire	4–2
43	January 9, 2015	Durham, NH	Tie	2–2
44	December 11, 2015	Durham, NH	New Hampshire	6–3
45	December 10, 2016	Hanover, NH	Dartmouth	5–1
46	December 29, 2017	Hanover, NH	Dartmouth	3–1
47	December 7, 2018	Hanover, NH	New Hampshire	3–2
48	December 8, 2018	Durham, NH	New Hampshire	4–0
49	November 2, 2019	Durham, NH	New Hampshire	5–4
50	December 30, 2021	Hanover, NH	Dartmouth	3–1
Series: New Hampshire leads 32–15–3
