= Saint Peter-Marian High School =

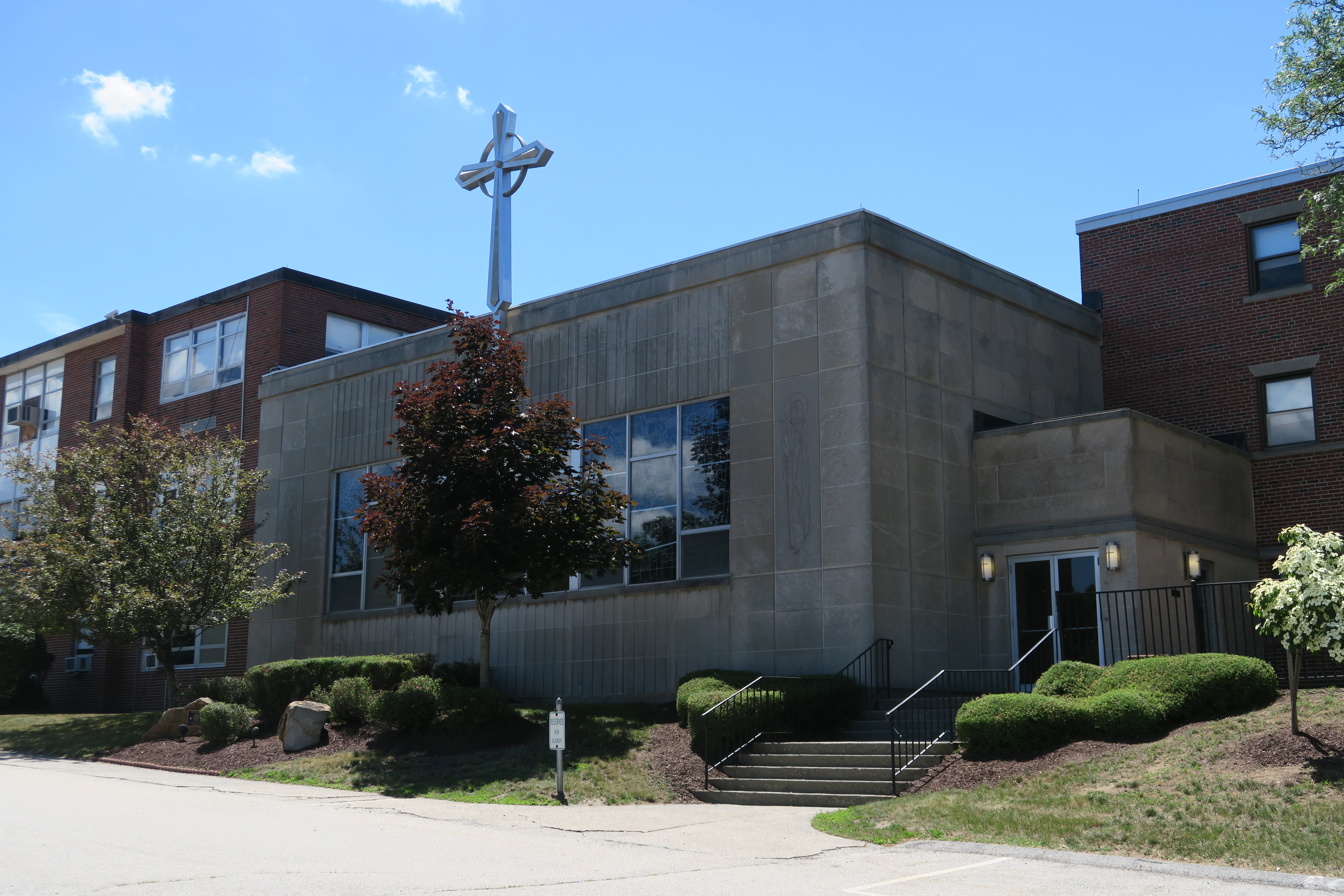

Location
- 781 Grove Street; Worcester, (Worcester County), Massachusetts 01605; United States; 42°18′24″N 71°49′27″W

Information
- Type: Private, Coeducational
- Motto: Through these doors walk the greatest
- Religious affiliation: Roman Catholic
- Established: 1921
- Closed: 2020
- CEEB code: 222525
- Principal: Dr. Bill Driscoll
- Grades: 7–12
- Colors: Purple and White
- Athletics conference: Central Mass
- Team name: Guardians
- Accreditation: New England Association of Schools and Colleges
- Newspaper: Guardian Globe
- Website: www.spmguardians.org

Saint Peter-Marian Central Catholic Junior-Senior High School, was a private, coeducational Catholic junior high and senior high school in Worcester, Massachusetts, United States. The school was more commonly referred to as St. Peter-Marian, or informally as SPM or St. Peter's. It was one of four high schools operated by the Roman Catholic Diocese of Worcester and was accredited by The New England Association of Schools & Colleges in 1969. After the 2019-2020 school year, SPM closed and merged with Holy Name. The school that they created is called Saint Paul’s, it is on the Holy Name campus.

== Campus and location ==
The campus formerly occupied by Saint Peter-Marian's is situated upon a hill in a residential neighborhood on Grove St in Worcester, less than one mile from the border with the town of Holden, Massachusetts. There is one main building with an annex that housed both the senior and junior high school. The campus also contained a football field, a baseball field, a softball field and a large parking lot.

The school has been abandoned since its 2020 closure, and the non-profit senior housing agency Goodard/Homestead plans to demolish and redevelop the cite into a 145 unit retirement home.

== History ==
The name Saint Peter-Marian comes from the two schools that formed it: Saint Peter's High School and Marian High School. There are four dates on the SPM seal. The year 1921 refers to the year in which Saint Peter's High School was established, on Main Street. St Peter's was a coeducational parish school operated by the Sisters of St. Joseph. The building is now occupied by St. Peter Central Catholic Elementary School. The year 1963 refers to the year in which Marian High School was built, an all-female school which was located on the Grove Street site of Saint Peter-Marian. Marian High School had a freshman class of 97 young women; the school was operated by the Sisters of Mercy. The year 1976 refers to the merging of St. Peter's High School and Marian High School to form Saint Peter-Marian High School. The year 1989 refers to the time at which the junior high school was implemented.

In 2003 the campus was expanded through the purchase of a nearby nursing home, which was extensively renovated and served as the building for the junior high school. The Junior High later moved back into the senior high school building. The school leased the old nursing home to Little Ones Child Care, a childcare agency.

In December 2019 the Archdiocese of Worcester announced that the school would close at the end academic year and merge with Holy Name, creating a new school to be named St Paul Diocesan Junior/Senior High School. The new school is located at the campus of Holy Name in Worcester.

== Academics ==
All students were required to earn 24 credits in order to graduate. This typically involved 4 years of religion, 4 years of mathematics, 4 years of English, 2–3 years of foreign language, 3–4 years of history and social studies, a half year of computer studies and an elective course.

The five core academic subjects in the curriculum were English, social studies, mathematics, science, and religion. Students could also take elective classes in foreign language, health, computer science, art, music, theater, business, and marketing. Students could also study Spanish and French.

== Athletics ==
The school had approximately 50 boys and girls sports teams that participated on the varsity, junior varsity, freshman, and junior high level. Saint Peter-Marian athletic teams generally competed at the Division 1 or Division 1A level and the school was a member of the Massachusetts Interscholastic Athletic Association.

== Student activities ==
Students at Saint Peter-Marian participated in the following school-sponsored organizations: Art Club (Jr. and Sr. High), Best Buddies, Campus Minister Team, Chorus (Jr. and Sr. High), Class Officers, Computer Club, Declamation Club (Jr. High), Eucharistic Ministers, Fair Tax Club, French Club, Guardian Globe, Guardians for Life, Habitat for Humanity, Junior High Speech Club Linus Club (Jr. High), Literary Magazine, Liturgical Choir, Math Club (Jr. High), Math Team, Mock Trial Team, Model UN (Junior High), Musicians Club, Mustard Seed, National Honor Society, National Jr. Honor Society (Jr. High), Peer Educators, Retreat Team, SADD Sr. High, Science Club (Jr. High), Scrapbook Club, Serviam Club (Jr. High), Ski Club (Jr. High), Special Olympics, Student Council, Theater (Jr. and Sr. High) and Yearbook (Jr. and Sr. High).

== College placement ==
Saint Peter-Marian offered a full college preparatory program. From 2005 to 2009, approximately 90% of students enrolled in a four-year college after graduation, while approximately 8% enrolled in a two-year college.

== Controversies ==
Saint Peter-Marian Junior/Senior High School in Worcester, MA, has faced various challenges and controversies throughout its history, especially in the lead up to its merger with Holy Name High School in 2020.

Enrollment

Over a 15-year period, St. Peter-Marian experienced a 66% decrease in student enrollment, while Holy Name High School saw a 42% drop. The Diocese of Worcester attributed these trends to broader demographic shifts and financial pressures on families. By 2019, the combined enrollment for both schools was insufficient to sustain operations independently.

This decline meant that both schools had surplus capacity, and the cost of maintaining their facilities became unsustainable. The Diocese decided that merging the schools would allow for a more efficient use of resources while ensuring the continuation of Catholic education in Worcester.

Financial Difficulties

Financial difficulties were a major challenge for the school. The Diocese had previously forgiven outstanding construction loans for St. Peter-Marian and Holy Name, but other debts remained. For example, St. Peter-Marian had loans associated with its campus renovations in 2003, while Holy Name had loans for projects like a wind turbine and roof replacements.

The sale of the St. Peter-Marian property in 2021 for $4.75 million provided funds to settle these debts. This sale also contributed to the financial stabilization of the newly formed Saint Paul Diocesan Junior/Senior High School, which was established as a consolidated Catholic high school on the former Holy Name campus.

Clercal Abuse

Peter J. Inzerillo served as headmaster at St. Peter-Marian from 1979 to 1985. Allegations against him include sexually abusing a 19-year-old man in 1985 during counseling sessions. The victim had approached Inzerillo after previously being abused by another priest. In 1999, the Diocese of Worcester settled the lawsuit for $300,000 but did not immediately remove him from ministry. He remained active until 2002 and was later defrocked by the Vatican in 2018 at his own request.

Robert Shauris was involved in a 1993 lawsuit alleging abuse of two boys in the mid-1980s while he worked at St. Bernard’s Catholic High School, another diocesan institution. Although he was associated with St. Peter-Marian's broader community, his abuse occurred elsewhere. The diocese settled the case in 2004. Shauris voluntarily left the priesthood in 2012 and was later identified as living in Worcester.

== Notable alumni ==
- Jerry Azumah, former professional football player for the Chicago Bears, Pro Bowl participant, and current sports television analyst
- Christopher Boffoli, fine art, commercial and editorial photographer
- Frank Carroll, professional figure skating coach (graduate of St. Peter's High School)
- Richard P. Cipro, US Army brigadier general
- Paul Duhart, former professional football player
- Rich Gedman, former Red Sox player, current Worcester Red Sox hitting coach
- Mike Kunigonis, college baseball coach
- Denis Leary, actor and comedian
- J.D. Power III, founder of JD Power and Associates
- J.P. Ricciardi, former Toronto Blue Jays General Manager and New York Mets executive
- Tanyon Sturtze, former Major League pitcher

== Notable faculty ==
- Frank Oftring, basketball coach
- Buster Sheary, basketball coach
