= Anthony D. Burke =

Australian political scientist (born 1966)

Anthony Burke (born 1966) is an Australian political theorist and international relations scholar. He is Professor of Environmental Politics and International Relations at the University of New South Wales. He is co-principal at the Planet Politics Institute.

His published work ranges across the fields of political theory and philosophy, environmental politics, science and technology studies, security studies, war and peace, international ethics, international law, and Australian politics and history. He has spent the last decade working on problems of planetary politics, governance and security, especially climate change, and written for Nature and The Washington Post on the crisis at the Zaporizhzhia nuclear plant and the environmental consequences of the Russian invasion of Ukraine.

He is the author of six books: The Ecology Politic: Power, Law & Earth in the Anthropocene (with Stefanie Fishel, MIT Press, 2025), Institutionalising Multispecies Justice (with Danielle Celermajer et al., Cambridge University Press, 2024), Uranium (Polity, 2017), Ethics and Global Security: A Cosmopolitan Approach (with Katrina Lee-Koo and Matt McDonald, Routledge 2014), Beyond Security, Ethics and Violence: War Against The Other (Routledge, 2007), and Fear of Security: Australia’s Invasion Anxiety (first edn. Pluto Press Australia, 2001; 2nd. edn. Cambridge University Press, 2008). He is the co-editor of Ethical Security Studies: A New Research Agenda (with Jonna Nyman, Routledge 2016), Global Insecurity: Futures of Global Chaos and Governance (with Rita Parker, Palgrave, 2017), and Critical Security in the Asia-Pacific (with Matthew McDonald, Manchester University Press, 2007).

Shorter works include "Interspecies Cosmopolitanism" (Review of International Studies, 2023), "Planet Politics: A Manifesto from the end of IR" (Millennium, 2016), "Security Cosmopolitanism" (Critical Studies on Security, 2013), "Humanity After Biopolitics" (Angelaki, 2011), "Ontologies of War" (Theory & Event, 2006), and "Aporias of Security" (Alternatives, 2002).

== Education and career ==
Anthony Burke received a B.A. (Communications) in 1991 and M.A. by thesis in 1994 from the University of Technology Sydney. He studied journalism, creative writing, cultural theory and politics under teachers and intellectuals such as the literary theorist Stephen Muecke, sociologists Jean Martin and Caroline Graham, poet Dorthy Porter and novelist Amanda Lohrey, semiologist Gunther Kress, media theorists Helen Wilson and McKenzie Wark and historians John Docker and Ann Curthoys. His fellow students included writers such as Claire Corbett, Lindsay Barrett, Fiona Allon, Bernard Cohen, and Anthony Macris. During this time, until the mid-1990s, he also worked as a human rights activist with the Nuclear Free and Independent Pacific movement and campaigns for East Timor, Bougainville, West Papua and Indonesia. In 1991-2 he was a researcher in telecommunications law and policy at the Communications Law Centre, UNSW.

He was awarded a PhD in Political Science and International Relations from the Australian National University in 1999, and subsequently worked in the Australian Senate as a committee researcher on the environment, arts and communications. Whilst there he led a research team on the Senate's 2000 report, The Heat is On: Australia’s Greenhouse Future and was a key author of its report on the Jabiluka uranium mine project, Undermining Process. He was appointed to a lectureship at the University of Queensland in 2001 and left to join the University of Adelaide in July that year. In 2005 he joined the University of New South Wales in Sydney, and since 2008 has worked at its campus in Canberra. He has held visiting fellowships at the Australian National University, the University of Birmingham, and the New School for Social Research in New York City.

== Writing and Approach ==
Burke has published six authored books, and a number of journal articles and essays, including an essay on biopolitics and the war on terror, "Life in the hall of smashed mirrors", which used a fictional form. After a period in the early 2000s working on Australian engagement with the politics and culture of the Asia-Pacific, in the wake of 9/11 he published a series of studies on the ethics of war and the political theory of security and the state. Thus began a lifelong interest in the promises and pathologies of the modern "body-politic" or "social contract" that forms the normative and legal underpinnings of the modern nation-state. His first two books, Fear of Security and Beyond Security Ethics & Violence, were initially concerned with the body-politic's problematic and racist systems of identity, exclusion, repression, and democracy. These concerns extended into a critique of its ecological consequences in The Ecology Politic.

Burke could be understood as a broadly critical theorist working across decolonial, post-Marxist, ecological, ecofeminist, and post-humanist problematics. His philosophy works across continental and analytical traditions, and has been consistently relational, decolonising, deconstructive, and emancipatory in intent. It combines a grounded and interdisciplinary critique of contemporary political ontology, governance practices, and democracy alongside efforts to rethink the bases and purposes of politics. The work first challenged the Body-Politic's legal-structural relations with violence, war, insecurity, and colonisation, and in his book with Stefanie Fishel, The Ecology Politic, moves to a positive vision of a transnational ecological polity attentive to a rapidly changing planetary situation.

=== Contemporary work: planetary politics ===
This simultaneously cosmopolitan and planetary awareness has underpinned a decade of work on nuclear politics and colonialism, "Planet Politics," and Earth system governance. Following his 2009 International Relations article on "Nuclear reason", he edited a 2016 special issue of Critical Studies on Security on nuclear politics, contributing the article "Nuclear Time". He published the 2017 book, Uranium, in Polity Press "resources" series - a text that ranged across the impacts of mining and nuclear testing on Indigenous people, the past and future of nuclear energy, the history of nuclear weapons and science, and the international security implications of nuclear strategy, arms control, and disarmament.

His work in environmental political theory and earth system governance includes a series of new treaty proposals on coal, forests and an "architecture for a net zero world"; political theories of "thing-systems power", biospheric ethics, and a material ecological democracy; and a jointly authored manifesto, "Planet Politics", calling on the institutions and study of world politics to engage with and repair an endangered Earth. The books The Ecology Politic and Institutionalising Multispecies Justice are the initial culmination of this research program.

=== Planetary cosmopolitanism ===
At the turn of the decade Burke begun to publish work engaging with Cosmopolitanism in philosophy, international relations, and political theory, which is pursued in a way that is both critical and transformative of more liberal notions of the cosmopolitan. His theory of "Security Cosmopolitanism" was published and debated in the inaugural 2013 issue of Critical Studies on Security, with a follow-up debate in 2015. Arguing that the realities of globalisation and the biosphere had made the classical model of the state both retrograde and dangerous, he proposed a new ethos that would radically transform both national and collective security practices, and grapple with how global insecurities emerge from within states and the very practices and systems of modernity. States can no longer immunise themselves, behind hardened borders, against threats from without. This theory framed the book, Ethics and Global Security: A Cosmopolitan Approach.

Burke has also published philosophical studies on the grounds, ethics, and ontology of cosmopolitanism. In a 2012 Angelaki essay, "Humanity After Biopolitics", Burke developed a distinctive empirical-normative justification for cosmopolitanism, a relational ontology to ground its claims and practices, and rejected a teleological vision of change. In 2013 he published another essay, "The Good State", which pushes beyond anthropocentrism to anchor its account in the vulnerability of humanity both to the political dangers it poses to itself and to the cosmic arrangement of chance that enables complex life on Earth. In 2023 he published a third essay, "Interspecies Cosmopolitanism", which pushes beyond the weak anthropocentrism of his earlier work in the wake of the COVID-19 pandemic, which exposed the agentic power of the virus to assemble with human and planetary flows into a landscape of devastation. The essay challenged the anthropocentric humanism of the cosmopolitan tradition and grounded a planetary cosmopolitan outlook in the materiality of a changing Earth and its life.

=== Early work: ontologies of strategy and security ===
Burke's first book, In Fear of Security: Australia's Invasion Anxiety, joined a theory of security as a "political technology" to an historical account of how security has been defined, sought, and mobilized as a system of power throughout Australian history. It has a particular emphasis on Australia's policy towards Indonesia and the Asia-Pacific. Its second edition includes a chapter on Australia's repression of asylum seekers and its involvement in the US-led war on terror, and a new conclusion setting out a more cosmopolitan future for Australia. While describing a more hopeful and progressive vision of Australian politics and foreign policy (in sympathy with broad notions of human security, or the Welsh School's emancipatory approach to critical security studies), its detailed empirical account of how security has functioned as a tool of the powerful in Australian history, at the same time as denying security and dignity to millions, challenges both conservative and progressive visions of security.

His second book, Beyond Security, Ethics and Violence: War Against the Other, combined political philosophy with a range of empirical studies: Israel/Palestine, the War on Terror, American exceptionalism, the Iraq and Vietnam wars, and the Australia-Indonesia relationship during the dictatorship of Soeharto. It develops his political theory of security and the state across three chapters, a further three chapters challenge dominant ethical approaches to national security, especially just war theory, and the final three chapters question the constitutive and dysfunctional role of violence in world politics, finding its claims linked closely with modern ideas of strategy, progress, and freedom.

== Controversy ==
In 2008, following the publication of an article in the new journal, Critical Studies on Terrorism, Burke was criticised by neo-conservative intellectuals in Australia. This dispute quickly attracted national media attention.

A Queensland university lecturer, Mervyn Bendle, writing in the far right magazine Quadrant, accused Burke and a number of other writers of supporting and apologizing for terrorism in their works. Bendle wrote that Burke had an "abstract and tendentious postmodernist perspective", and that "one gets an impression not only of the "radical pacifism" deplored by Ungerer, but of a deeper, almost pathological tendency revealed in Burke's antipathy for liberal democracies and mainstream Australians, and his relentless sympathy for terrorists, illegal immigrants, communists, and "the Other" in its multitudinous forms". Bendle also repeated these views on ABC Radio National's Religion Report and in The Australian.

Burke responded by stating that he was neither a pacifist nor a supporter of terrorism, and stressed that his work "has been about trying to make liberal democracy better, better at living up to its own values and protecting the freedoms that are proclaimed so loudly about". He emphasized that he had consistently "condemned terrorism as an immoral, illegitimate and politically counter-productive form of violence". He responded to the claims in an interview on ABC Radio National and his scholarship on terrorism was profiled in The Australian's Higher Education Supplement.

== Selected works ==
=== Books ===
- The Ecology Politic: Power, Law & Earth in the Anthropocene (with Stefanie Fishel, The MIT Press, 2025). here
- Institutionalising Multispecies Justice (with Danielle Celermajer, Stefanie Fishel, Erin Fitzhenry, Nicole Rogers, David Schlosberg, and Christine Winter, Cambridge University Press, 2024.)
- Uranium (Polity Press, 2017). here
- Ethical Security Studies: A New Research Agenda (ed. with Jonna Nyman, Routledge 2016). here
- Ethics & Global Security: A Cosmopolitan Approach (with Katrina Lee-Koo and Matt McDonald, Routledge, 2014). here
- Fear of Security: Australia’s Invasion Anxiety (Cambridge University Press, 2008 and Pluto Press Australia, 2001). here
- Beyond Security, Ethics & Violence: War Against The Other (Routledge, 2007). here

=== Articles ===
- “Interspecies Cosmopolitanism: Nonhuman Power and the Grounds of World Order in the Anthropocene”, Review of International Studies, Vol. 49, No. 2, April 2023.
- “An Architecture for a Net Zero World: Global Climate Governance Beyond the Epoch of Failure”, Global Policy, Vol. 13 Issue S3, December 2022.
- “A Coal Elimination Treaty 2030: Fast-tracking Climate Change Mitigation, Human Health and Security” (with Stefanie Fishel), Earth System Governance, Vol. 1 No. 3, 2020.
- “Blue Screen Biosphere: The Absent Presence of Biodiversity in International Law”, International Political Sociology, Vol. 13 No. 3, 2019.
- "Planet Politics: A Manifesto from the end of IR", with Stefanie Fishel, Audra Mitchell, Simon Dalby & Daniel J. Levine, Millennium, Vol. 33 No. 3, 2016.
- "Security Cosmopolitanism", Critical Studies on Security, Vol. 1 No. 1, 2013.
- "Humanity After Biopolitics: On the Global Politics of Human Being", Angelaki: Journal of the Theoretical Humanities, Vol. 16 No. 4, 2011.
- "Nuclear Reason: At the Limits of Strategy", International Relations, Vol. 23 No. 4, December 2009.
- "Life in the Hall of Smashed Mirrors", Borderlands, Vol. 7 No. 1, 2008, and Meanjin Quarterly, Vol. 67 No. 4, December 2008.
- "The End of Terrorism Studies", Critical Studies on Terrorism, Vol. 1 No. 1, 2008.
- "Ontologies of War: Violence, Existence, and Reason", Theory & Event, Vol. 10 No. 2, July 2007.
- Burke, Anthony (September 2005). "Against the New Internationalism". Ethics & International Affairs. 19 (2): 73–89. doi:10.1111/j.1747-7093.2005.tb00501.x.
- "Just War or Ethical Peace? Moral Discourses of Strategic Violence after 9/11", International Affairs, Vol. 80 No. 2, March 2004.
- "Aporias of Security", Alternatives: Global, Local, Political, Vol. 27 No. 1, Jan–Mar 2002.
