= Miriam Moffitt =

American jazz pianist (1884–1954)

Miriam "Mamie" Moffitt
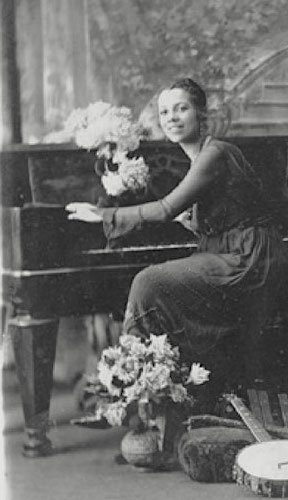
- Born: Miriam Leona Seals; 1884; New Bedford, Massachusetts, U.S.
- Died: October 17, 1954 (aged 69–70); Hyannis, Massachusetts, U.S.
- Other name: Miriam Seales Moffitt
- Known for: Mamie Moffitt and Her Five Jazz Hounds
- Spouse(s): John Thomas (m. 1901–c.1915) Wallace Moffitt (m. 1918)

Miriam Moffitt (1884–1954), also known as Mamie Moffitt, was an American jazz pianist and band leader. In the 1920s, she started Mamie Moffitt and Her Five Jazz Hounds, the first professional jazz group in Worcester, Massachusetts. In 2020, the Telegram & Gazette called Mamie Moffitt "Worcester's First Lady of Jazz".

== Early life and education ==
She was born Miriam Leona Seals in 1884, in New Bedford, Massachusetts. Her maiden name was also spelled Seales. Her parents were Harrison Seals (1847–1942) and Esther Seals (1854–1941). Both her parents were of mixed African American and Native American ancestry. Her father, Harrison Seals, was born in New Bedford, where he worked as a stove maker and tinsmith. She was named after her paternal grandmother, Miriam Johnson Seals, who had once been enslaved. Her mother, born Esther Fields, was part-African American and part-Mohawk Indian. Aware of Miriam's musical talent from a young age, Esther Seals arranged for her daughter to receive formal training in piano.

== Musical career ==
Starting in her teens, Miriam Seals performed extensively across a wide range of musical genres, as a soloist, accompanist, and in ensembles. Her first job was as an accompanist at the New Bedford School of Dance. She also played for theatre groups and was a church organist. She had the opportunity to showcase her improvisation skills while playing in silent film theaters, and on harbor cruises at New Bedford. Her popular music repertoire included “cake walks, rags, two steps...marches, popular songs, and dance pieces.”

=== Piano teacher in New York City ===
In 1901, she married and moved to New York City, where she taught piano. According to family members, Miriam Seals Thomas taught several musicians who went on to become accomplished jazz artists, including Noble Sissle and Lionel Hampton.

=== Mamie Moffitt and Her Five Jazz Hounds ===
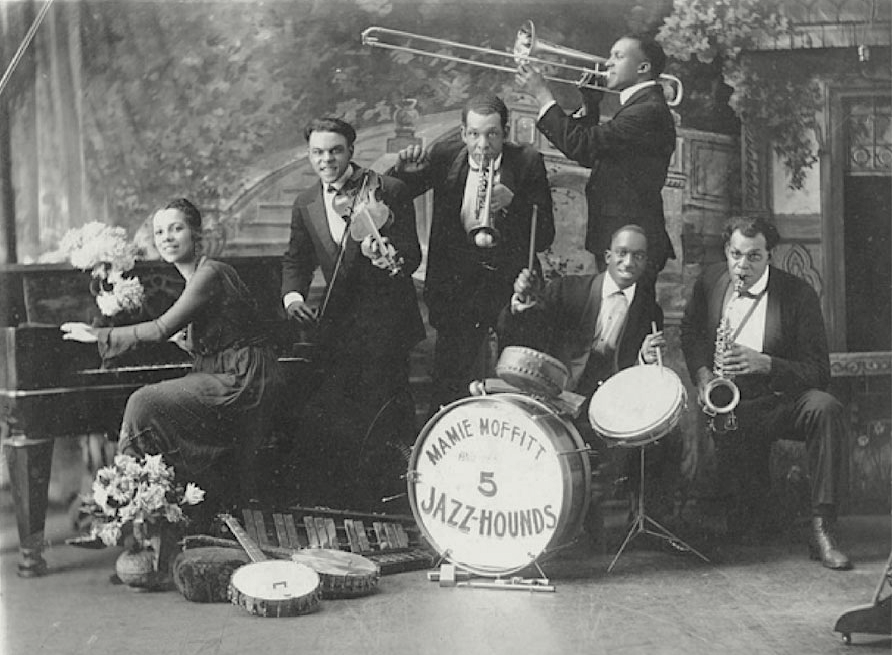
Mamie Moffitt and Her Five Jazz Hounds (1923)

After marrying a second time and moving to Worcester, she started Mamie Moffitt and Her Five Jazz Hounds, the first jazz ensemble in the city of Worcester. From 1922 to 1928, Miriam Moffitt was the band leader and pianist. Band members included:

- Miriam “Mamie” Moffitt on piano;
- Wallace Moffitt on cornet;
- Alfred Moffitt on saxophone;
- Harold Black on violin and banjo;
- John Byard on trombone; and
- Boots Ward on drums.

The "Five Jazz Hounds" included family and relatives, including her husband Wallace, her brother-in-law Alfred, and Alfred's nephew Harold Black. Young Wendell Culley was an occasional guest on the trumpet. After Mamie Moffitt left, drummer Boots Ward started his own band, The Nite Hawks, which included Harold Black and John Byard.

== Personal life and family ==
In 1901, Miriam married John Thomas, who worked on the rail service between New Jersey and New York City. After their divorce, Miriam moved back to New Bedford with their two daughters: Natalie (born 1902) and Dorothy Thomas (born 1907).

In 1918, Miriam married Wallace Moffitt, a cornet player from Worcester, Massachusetts. He had two children of his own, Donald and Edna Moffitt. Later, Miriam and Wallace also adopted Madeline Moffitt.

=== Other family businesses ===
In the early 1930s, Miriam and Wallace opened a popular restaurant in Worcester called Moffitt's Chicken Coop, as well as a battery shop. In 1949, the Moffitts moved to Mashpee, Massachusetts on Cape Cod, and opened a summer guest house called Popponesett-in-the-Pines, which they ran for a few years until they retired.

== Death and legacy ==
Miriam Moffitt died on October 17, 1954. Trumpet player Wendell Culley, who by then was playing with the Count Basie Orchestra, was said to have visited her before she died.

In recent years, Miriam "Mamie" Moffitt has been referred to as "Worcester's First Lady of Jazz". Her biography, including many photographs and oral history interviews, are now featured in the Jazz History Database at the Worcester Polytechnic Institute. The Jazz History Database was established in 2001, after Rich Falco started researching the musical roots of Jaki Byard, who has been called “the most acclaimed and influential jazz musician to come out of Worcester”. When he was in high school, Jaki Byard wrote arrangements and occasionally played the piano for his father's band, The Nite Hawks, which had originally formed as an offshoot of Mamie Moffitt and Her Five Jazz Hounds.

== See also ==
- Wendell Culley
- Jaki Byard
