= Boots Ward =

American jazz musician, drummer, club owner

Boots Ward was an American jazz drummer and jazz club owner.

In the early 1920s, Ward was a member of Mamie Moffitt's Five Jazz Hounds, together with, among others, Harold Black on violin and banjo, John Byard (father of Jaki Byard) on trombone and, occasionally Wendell Culley on trumpet.

Following the breakup of the band, due to Moffitt's ill health, Ward went on the form the Nite Hawks, with Byard, Black, Culley, and Freddie Bates on tenor sax, who would be joined, in 1929, by Howie Jefferson.

Ward also ran the Nile Cafe, a jazz venue on Summer Street in Worcester. Boots Ward's Nile Cafe is believed to have been the only jazz venue with an African American owner at the time.
