= Anthony Burke (cricketer) =

Irish cricketer and British Army officer

Personal information
- Full name: Anthony Owen Leo Burke
- Born: 17 January 1897; British India
- Died: 17 February 1942 (aged 45); Kyaikto, British Burma
- Batting: Unknown
- Role: Occasional wicket-keeper

Domestic team information
- Years: Team
- 1926/27: Europeans

Career statistics
Competition	First-class
Matches	1
Runs scored	7
Batting average	7.00
100s/50s	–/–
Top score	7
Catches/stumpings	–/1
- Source: ESPNcricinfo, 6 November 2023

Anthony Owen Leo Burke (17 January 1897 – 17 February 1942) was an Irish first-class cricketer and an officer in both the British Army and the British Indian Army.

The son of Peter Joseph Burke and his wife, Mary, he was born in January 1897 in British India. Burke fought in the First World War, being commissioned into the Royal Dublin Fusiliers as a second lieutenant in March 1917; in April 1918, he was seconded to the British Indian Army and was granted the temporary rank of lieutenant in September 1918. Following the war, he gained the full rank of lieutenant in December 1918, and spent a short period as an acting captain whilst commanding a company with the 2nd and 7th Gurkha Rifles. Following Irish independence in 1922, Burke remained in the British Indian Army, in which he gained the full rank of captain in November 1922. Whilst in India, Burke made a single appearance in first-class cricket for the Europeans cricket team against the touring Marylebone Cricket Club at Karachi in October 1926. Opening the batting once in the match, he was dismissed for 7 runs by Bob Wyatt.

In November 1932, he was appointed to be an instructor, with promotion to major following in November 1935. By 1936, he was resident in England, where he assisted the Cranleigh School contingent of the Officers' Training Corps. Burke served with the Gurkha Rifles in the Second World War, being killed in action at Kyaikto in February 1942 during the Japanese invasion of Burma; he was posthumously mentioned in dispatches for his gallant and distinguished service throughout the invasion. Burke's body was never recovered, but he is commemorated on the Rangoon Memorial.
