= Richard P. Cipro =

US Army brigadier general

- Cipro as a brigadier general in 2026
- Born: 1965 (age 60–61); Worcester, Massachusetts, US
- Education: Worcester State University; Anna Maria College; United States Army Command and General Staff College; Naval War College
- Spouse: Colleen K. Gleason (m. 1991)
- Children: 4
- Military career
- Service: United States Coast Guard; United States Army
- Service years: 1985–Present
- Rank: Brigadier General
- Units: United States Coast Guard Reserve; Massachusetts Army National Guard; New York Army National Guard
- Commands: 747th Military Police Company; 211th Military Police Battalion; 79th Troop Command; Land Component, Massachusetts National Guard; 42nd Infantry Division
- Wars: War in Afghanistan; Iraq War
- Awards: Legion of Merit; Bronze Star Medal; Meritorious Service Medal (6); Army Commendation Medal (3); Air Force Commendation Medal; Army Achievement Medal
- Other work: Sergeant, Worcester (Massachusetts) Police Department

Richard P. Cipro (born 1965) is a career officer in the United States Army. A longtime member of the Army National Guard in Massachusetts and New York, In October 2024 he was assigned as the Massachusetts National Guard's assistant adjutant general for army and promoted to brigadier general. In December 2025, he was assigned as the Massachusetts National Guard's land component commander while simultaneously serving as deputy commander for reserve affairs with the United States Army's Southern European Task Force, Africa in Vicenza, Italy. In October 2026, he was assigned as commander of the 42nd Infantry Division, an assignment he carried out while continuing in his position with the Southern European Task Force. Cipro is a veteran of the War in Afghanistan and the Iraq War, and his awards include the Legion of Merit, Bronze Star Medal, six awards of the Meritorious Service Medal, three awards of the Army Commendation Medal, the Air Force Commendation Medal, and the Army Achievement Medal.

== Early life ==
Richard Peter Cipro Jr. was born in Worcester, Massachusetts in 1965, a son of Richard P. Cipro Sr. and Rosemary T. (Finnegan) Cipro. He was raised and educated in Worcester, and is a 1983 graduate of Worcester's Saint Peter-Marian High School. After high school, Cipro was employed at the United States Postal Service's Worcester office. In September 1991, Cipro married Colleen K. Gleason of Worcester; they are the parents of four children. In 1992, he received a Bachelor of Arts degree in history from Worcester State University.

== Civilian career ==
In August 1994, Cipro joined the Worcester Police Department. He attained the rank of sergeant with the Worcester PD and served for over 30 years, with his retirement scheduled for December 2026. During his law enforcement career, Cipro was assigned at different times to the Worcester Police's patrol division, academy and training division, chief's office, SWAT (Special Weapons and Tactics) team, and as patrol sergeant for the traffic and accident reconstruction division. In 1998, he received a Master of Arts degree in criminal justice from Anna Maria College. In 2002, he was elected as president of Worcester's police union, Local 378 of the International Brotherhood of Police Officers. He held this post until he was promoted to sergeant in 2007. In 2021, Cipro was an unsuccessful candidate for election to the Worcester City Council.

== Start of military career ==
In 1985, Cipro began his military career when he joined the United States Coast Guard Reserve. In 1991, transferred his military membership to the Massachusetts Army National Guard's 972nd Military Police Company. He served as an enlisted soldier until 1999, when he completed Officer Candidate School at the 101st Regiment (Regional Training Institute) as a Distinguished Graduate and received his commission as a second lieutenant. Assigned to the Military Police Corps, Cipro served as a platoon leader with the 972nd Military Police Company in Melrose, Massachusetts from June 1999 to March 2004. He graduated from the basic course for Military Police officers and was promoted to first lieutenant in September 2001. During the Global War on Terrorism, Cipro was assigned to Boston's Logan International Airport for Operation Noble Eagle (2001 to 2002) and Jacobabad, Pakistan for Operation Enduring Freedom (2002 to 2003).

From April 2004 to December 2006, Cipro commanded the 747th Military Police Company in Ware, Massachusetts. He completed the Military Police Officer Advanced Course and was promoted to captain in August 2004. He served as logistics officer (S-4) for the 211th Military Police Battalion in Lexington, Massachusetts from January 2007 to July 2010, including deployment to Taji, Iraq for Operation Iraqi Freedom from July 2009 to June 2010. From August 2010 to November 2012, he was executive officer of the 211th Military Police Battalion, and he was promoted to major in November 2010. From December 2012 to Jul 2013, Cipro was assigned as plans officer on the staff of the 26th Maneuver Enhancement Brigade (MEB) in Reading, Massachusetts. He served as the 26th MEB's protection officer and provost marshal from August 2013 to July 2014. From August 2014 to October 2014, he served as deputy joint exercise, interagency coordination, and homeland defense/civil support training officer (J-7) at Joint Force Headquarters – Massachusetts.

== Later military career ==
Cipro served as plans and policy officer at the Massachusetts Joint Force Headquarters-Massachusetts from November 2014 to September 2015. He graduated from the United States Army Command and General Staff College and received promotion to lieutenant colonel in June 2015. From October 2015 August 2016, he served as antiterrorism/force protection/critical infrastructure protection officer at Joint Force Headquarters – Massachusetts. From September 2016 to September 2018 he commanded the 211th Military Police Battalion. He served as deputy commander of the 26th MEB from October to November 2018, then began attendance at the Naval War College; he graduated in November 2019 with a Master of Arts in strategic studies. From December 2019 to January 2022, Cipro commanded the 79th Troop Command in Rehoboth, Massachusetts. He was promoted to colonel in September 2020. Additional training and education Cipro has completed during his military career includes the Support Operations Course, Combined Arms Exercise Course, Senior Leader Development Seminar (SLDS), Dual Status Commanders Course, and Joint Task Force Commanders Course. In addition, he completed the Crisis Leadership at the Harvard Kennedy School's Executive Education Seminar.

From February 2022 to September 2024, Cipro served as the Massachusetts Army National Guard's chief of staff. In October 2024, Cipro received promotion to brigadier general. From October 2024 to November 2025, he was assigned as assistant adjutant general for army at the Massachusetts Joint Force Headquarters. Beginning in August 2025, Cipro carried out a dual-hat posting as deputy commander (reserve affairs) for the United States Army's Southern European Task Force, Africa in Vicenza, Italy. In December 2025, he was assigned as the Massachusetts National Guard's land component commander while continuing to serve in Vicenza. In October 2026, he was selected to command the 42nd Infantry Division, headquartered in Troy, New York, and he carried out this posting while continuing to serve as the Southern European Task Force's deputy commander.

== Awards ==
Cipro's awards and decorations include:

- Legion of Merit
- Bronze Star Medal
- Meritorious Service Medal with 1 silver oak leaf cluster
- Army Commendation Medal with 2 bronze oak leaf clusters
- Air Force Commendation Medal
- Army Achievement Medal
- Army Reserve Components Achievement Medal with 1 silver oak leaf cluster and 3 bronze oak leaf clusters
- Coast Guard Good Conduct Medal
- National Defense Service Medal with 1 bronze service star
- Iraq Campaign Medal with 1 bronze service star
- Global War on Terrorism Expeditionary Medal
- Global War on Terrorism Service Medal
- Armed Forces Reserve Medal with gold hourglass, M device, and Arabic numeral 2
- Army Service Ribbon
- Overseas Service Ribbon
- Army Reserve Components Overseas Training Ribbon
- Joint Meritorious Unit Award
- Security Forces Senior Qualification Badge
- German Armed Forces Badge for Military Proficiency (Silver)

== Dates of rank ==
Cipro's dates of rank are:

- Brigadier General, 1 October 2024
- Colonel, 30 September 2020
- Lieutenant Colonel, 12 June 2015
- Major, 23 November 2010
- Captain, 4 October 2004
- First Lieutenant, 17 September 2001
- Second Lieutenant, 28 June 1999
- Enlisted service, Army National Guard, 1991 to 1999
- Enlisted service, Coast Guard Reserve, 1985 to 1991
