= WUNH =

Coordinates: 43.156°N 70.940°W

- Durham, New Hampshire; United States
- Broadcast area: Seacoast Region (New Hampshire); Southern Maine; Northern Massachusetts
- Frequency: 91.3 (MHz)
- Branding: 91.3 FM WUNH Durham

Programming
- Format: Variety

Ownership
- Owner: University System of New Hampshire

History
- First air date: 1963
- Call sign meaning: University of New Hampshire

Technical information
- Licensing authority: FCC
- Facility ID: 69327
- Class: A
- ERP: 1,450 watts horizontal; 6,000 watts vertical
- HAAT: 78 meters (256 ft)

Links
- Public license information: Public file; LMS
- Webcast: Listen live
- Website: www.unh.edu/wunh/

WUNH is a non-commercial college radio station at the University of New Hampshire, in Durham, New Hampshire. The station broadcasts alternative music, sports, and more to the community and surrounding area on 6000 watts.

== History ==
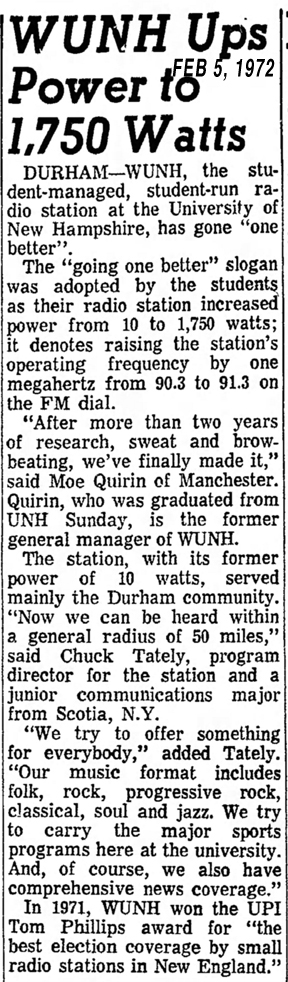
Newspaper clipping from the Portsmouth Herald

The first radio broadcasts from the University of New Hampshire (UNH) campus were agricultural programs sponsored by the cooperative extension service. These were broadcast live over telephone lines to WHEB in Portsmouth, New Hampshire. In 1930, a radio station was constructed on the third floor of Thompson Hall, the main administrative building, and students from the Speech and Drama Department formed the Mike and Dial Club (WMDR), producing live dramatic plays and a variety of other shows. In 1952, a new transmitter allowed the campus to send radio signals through electrical lines on campus, and WMDR radio was born. In 1958, the station moved into the newly constructed Memorial Union Building and in 1961 successfully applied for an FM broadcasting license for WUNH. The station signed on as a 10 watt FM educational at 90.3 in 1963.

In 1972, WUNH began FM broadcasting at 1750V/1750H watts and changed its frequency to 91.3. In 1997 the station received classification as a type A radio station, and began broadcasting at 6000V/1400H watts, allowing a coverage area that spans from southeastern to central New Hampshire and extends as far north as Cumberland County in Maine and south to Essex County in Massachusetts. In 2004, the university installed a 300-watt digital transmitter for HD radio.

== Awards ==
- 1970: New England Broadcast Award, 1st Place Election Coverage United Press International
- 1980: For excellence in presidential coverage
- 1997: College Station of the Year from The Gavin Report
- 2011: Student Organization of the Year from The University of New Hampshire
- 2018: Student Organization of the Year from The University of New Hampshire
- 2023: Student Collaboration of the Year alongside Campus Activities Board and GirlUp UNH from The University of New Hampshire for FM-Power

== Programming ==
Shows are run by UNH students and community members. General programming shows (mostly student shows) include a minimum of 50% new (released within the past 60 days) independently released music, with no music played from the Billboard Top 40. Specialty shows focus on a specific genre and do not need to follow the new music rule. Currently, there are shows dedicated to reggae, classical, jazz, polka, bluegrass, blues, Celtic, world, Hawaiian, folk, show tunes, electronica, and metal. WUNH also broadcasts a selection of UNH football, basketball, and hockey contests. Interviews of musicians and members amongst the UNH community are done regularly as well as frequent ticket giveaways with popular music venues. The station also hosts live bands on a consistent basis, allowing WUNH to become a part of the live music circuit in the seacoast. They also host Vinyl Week, a week each semester where nothing but Vinyl is played by all DJs.

== Notable alumni ==
- Jack Edwards, sportscaster, formerly on Versus, and ESPN; now play-by-play announcer for Boston Bruins games on NESN

== Executive board ==
=== 2025 ===
- Jack McDonough - General Manager (May 2025 - present)
- Erin Daly - Program Director (May 2025 - present)
- Joe Faherty - Business Manager (May 2025 - present)
- Jackson Scheele - Training Director (May 2025 - present)
- Morgan Hurney - Music Director (May 2025 - present)
- Kelsey Hodsdon - Production Director (May 2025 - present)
- Max O'Malley - Promotion Director (May 2025 - present)
- David Markowitz - Events Director (May 2024 - present)
- Mallory Schumann and Morgan Pritchett - Fundraising Coordinators (May 2025 - present)
- Gray Mucilli - Secretary (May 2025 - present)

=== 2024 ===
- Abigail Weckesser - General Manager (May 2024 – May 2025)
- Jack McDonough - Program Director (May 2024 – May 2025)
- Caroline Ash - Business Manager (May 2024 – May 2025)
- Jordan Lowery - Training Director (May 2024 – May 2025)
- Katie Clayton - Music Director (May 2024 – May 2025)
- Kelsey Hodsdon - Production Director (May 2024 – May 2025)
- Morgan Hurney - Promotion Director (May 2024 – May 2025)

=== 2023 ===
- Abigail Weckesser - General Manager (April 2023 – May 2024)
- Maxwell Lalos - Program Director (May 2023 – May 2024)
- Caroline Ash - Business Manager (April 2023 – May 2024)
- Casey Trozinski - Chief Announcer (May 2023 – May 2024)
- Katie Clayton - Music Director (May 2023 – May 2024)
- Jack McDonough - Production Director (May 2023 – May 2024)
- Isabel Crooks - Promotion Director (May 2023 – May 2024)

=== 2022 ===
- Lena Topouzoglou - General Manager (May 2022-April 2023)
- Kate Possi - Program Director (May 2022-May 2023)
- Douglas Jones - Business Manager (May 2022-April 2023)
- Lydia Tusler - Chief Announcer (May 2022-May 2023)
- Katie Clayton - Music Director (May 2022-May 2023)
- Lily Neher - Production Director (May 2022-May 2023)
- Casey Trozinski - Promotion Director (May 2022 - May 2023)

=== 2021 ===
- Samantha Coetzee - General Manager (May 2021-December 2021)
- Samuel Graff - Program Director (May 2021-May 2022), General Manager (December 2021-May 2022)
- Kate Possi - Business Manager (May 2021-May 2022)
- Lydia Tusler - Chief Announcer (May 2021-May 2022)
- Braeden Hale - Music Director (May 2021-May 2022)
- Lily Neher - Production Director (May 2021-May 2022)
- Lena Topouzoglou - Promotion Director (May 2021-May 2022)

=== 2020 ===
- Samantha Coetzee – General Manager (May 2020-May 2021)
- Hayden Stinson – Program Director (May 2020-May 2021)
- Samuel Graff – Chief Announcer (May 2020-May 2021)
- Angelee Ganno – Business Manager (May 2020-May 2021)
- Braden Hale - Music Director (May 2020-May 2021)
- Kelsea Batchelder - Promotions Director (May 2020-May 2021)

=== 2019 ===
- Teddy McNulty – General Manager (May 2019-May 2020)
- Hayden Stinson - Program Director (May 2019-May 2020)
- Braeden Hale - Music Director (May 2019-May 2020)
- Kelsea Batchelder – Business Manager (May 2019-May 2020)
- Nikita Serdiuk - Events Director (May 2019-May 2020)
- Sam Coetzee - Chief Announcer (May 2019-May 2020)
- Colby Deschenes - Webmaster (May 2019-May 2020)
- Lauren Hellman - Marathon Coordinator (May 2019-May 2020)
- Sophie Topozoglou - Promotions Director (May 2019-May 2020)
- Angelee Ganno - Production Director (May 2019-May 2020)
- Chloe Serena - News Director (May 2019-May 2020)
- Sebastian McLinden - Secretary (May 2019-May 2020)

=== 2010 ===
- Christofer Buchanan - General Manager (Sept 2010 - May 2011)
- Sarah LaPointe - Program Director (Sept 2010 - May 2011)
- Nick Cianci - Music Director (Sept 2010 - May 2011)
- Ian Chase - Chief Announcer (Sept 2010 - May 2011)
- Spencer Watkins - Production Director (Sept 2010 - May 2011)
- Erin Dillon - Events and Promotion Director (Sept 2010 - May 2011)
- Aleece Johnson - Business Manager (Sept 2010 - May 2011)
- Matt Walsh - Sports Director (Sept 2010 - May 2011)
- Amanda Beland - News Director (Sept 2010 - May 2011)
- Brendan McCann - Webmaster (Sept 2010 - May 2011)
- Autumn Sundt - Historian (Sept 2010 - May 2011)
- Amanda Mead - Secretary (Sept 2010 - May 2011)

== See also ==
- College radio
- List of college radio stations in the United States
