= Buster Sheary =

American basketball coach

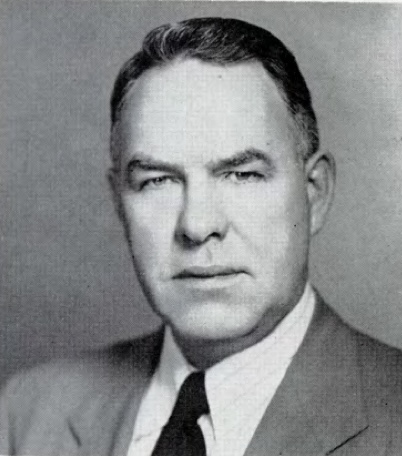
- Sheary c.1949

Biographical details
- Born: August 9, 1908; Worcester, Massachusetts, U.S.
- Died: November 30, 2001 (aged 93); Worcester, Massachusetts, U.S.
- Education: Catholic

Coaching career (HC unless noted)

Basketball
- 1935–1937: Saint Peter's HS
- 1937–1940: Saint John's HS
- 1940–1944: South HS
- 1944–1946: Holy Cross (assistant)
- 1948–1955: Holy Cross

Football
- 1935–1936: Saint Peter's HS
- 1937–1939: Saint John's HS
- 1940–1943: South HS

Administrative career (AD unless noted)
- 1946–1981: Worcester Public Schools (Asst. AD)

Head coaching record
- Overall: 155–36 (.812)
- Tournaments: NCAA: 2-3 (.400); NIT: 4-2 (.667)

Accomplishments and honors

Championships
- 1954 NIT Champion

Lester Howard "Buster" Sheary (August 9, 1908 – November 30, 2001) was an American college men's basketball coach. He was the head coach of Holy Cross from 1948 to 1955. He coached Holy Cross to a 155-36 record, winning the 1954 National Invitation Tournament and making two NCAA tournament appearances.

== Early life ==
Sheary grew up in Worcester, Massachusetts and received the nickname Buster from a group of firefighters who worked near the Sheary home, as they thought that Lester was not a good name. He graduated from Worcester Commerce High School and spent a postgraduate year at Saint Peter's High School. He then attended Catholic University of America, where he played guard and forward for the school's basketball team and was a fullback, linebacker, punter, and kicker for the Catholic football squad. He was captain of the 1932 Catholic University Cardinals football team and was a member of the South team in the 1932 North–South Game.

== Coaching ==
Sheary began his coaching career at Saint Peter's, where he led the basketball team to victory in the 1936 New England Catholic basketball tournament. He then coached at Saint John's High School and South High Community School. His 1942 South football team went 7–1 and outscored its opposition 106-13. The following season, South went undefeated and won the Inter-High League championship.

During World War II, Sheary was an athletic specialist with the United States Navy's V-12 Program at Holy Cross. He was an assistant basketball coach for the Crusaders during the 1944–45 and 1945–46 seasons. After his release from the service, Sheary was the assistant director of competitive athletics in the Worcester Public Schools and scouted for the Holy Cross basketball team.

In 1948, Holy Cross basketball coach Doggie Julian resigned to become head coach of the Boston Celtics and Crusader players lobbied for Sheary to replace him. He led Holy Cross to a 155–36 record in his seven seasons as head coach. His 1953–54 team won the National Invitation Tournament. He coached three All-American players: Bob Cousy, Tom Heinsohn, and Togo Palazzi. He was offered head coaching jobs at large schools, but turned them down to remain at Holy Cross. He resigned on August 5, 1955 due to a salary dispute.

== Later life ==
In 1973, Sheary was an assistant coach under Bob Cousy on a college all-star team that played against a team from the Soviet Union. He retired as assistant athletic director of the Worcester Public Schools in 1981. He was inducted into the Holy Cross, Catholic University, St. Peter's High School, St. John's High School, Boys & Girls Club of Worcester, and Massachusetts High School Football Coaches Association halls of fame. His wife, Mary F. (Connors) Sheary, died in 1986. Sheary died on November 30, 2001 at a nursing home in Worcester. He was survived by two daughters.

== Head coaching record ==
Record table
Season	Team	Overall	Conference	Standing	Postseason
Holy Cross Crusaders (Independent) (1948–1955)
1948–49	Holy Cross	19-8			
1949–50	Holy Cross	27-4			NCAA Elite Eight
1950–51	Holy Cross	20-5			
1951–52	Holy Cross	24-4			NIT Quarterfinals
1952–53	Holy Cross	20-6			NCAA Elite Eight
1953–54	Holy Cross	26-2			NIT Champions
1954–55	Holy Cross	19-7			NIT Quarterfinals
Holy Cross:		155–36 (.812)			
Total:		155–36 (.812)			
National champion Postseason invitational champion Conference regular season champion Conference regular season and conference tournament champion Division regular season champion Division regular season and conference tournament champion Conference tournament champion
