= Jerry Azumah =

American football player (born 1977)

No. 23
- Positions: Cornerback, Kick Returner

Personal information
- Born: September 1, 1977 (age 49); Oklahoma City, Oklahoma, U.S.
- Listed height: 5 ft 10 in (1.78 m)
- Listed weight: 205 lb (93 kg)

Career information
- High school: Saint Peter-Marian (Worcester, Massachusetts)
- College: New Hampshire (1995–1998)
- NFL draft: 1999: 5th round, 147th overall pick

Career history
- Chicago Bears (1999–2005)

Awards and highlights
- Second-Team All-Pro (2003); Pro Bowl (2003); Walter Payton Award (1998); Silver Anniversary Award (2024); Unanimous All-American (1998); First-team All-American (1997, as Kick Returner; 1998); All-Atlantic 10 Conference (1998); ECAC All-Star (1998); New England Player of the Year (1998); Atlantic 10 Offensive Player of the Year (1998); UNH Hall of Fame No. 25 retired (2005)

Career NFL statistics
- Total tackles: 352
- Sacks: 6.5
- Forced fumbles: 6
- Interceptions: 10
- Total return yards: 2,901
- Total touchdowns: 4
- Stats at Pro Football Reference
- College Football Hall of Fame

Jerry Azumah (/əˈzuːmə/ ə-ZOO-mə; born September 1, 1977) is an American former professional football player who was a cornerback for seven seasons with the Chicago Bears of the National Football League (NFL). He played college football for the New Hampshire Wildcats, where he won the Walter Payton Award, and was selected by the Bears in the fifth round of the 1999 NFL draft. He was selected as second-team All-Pro in 2003 and played in the 2004 Pro Bowl.

== Early life ==
Azumah is the first-generation American son of Theophilus and Bertha Azumah, natives of Ghana. Azumah was born in Oklahoma and grew up in Worcester, Massachusetts. At an early age, he played for the Worcester Vikings Pop Warner football team. Azumah attended Saint Peter-Marian High School receiving football honors as a Central Massachusetts and Shriners All-Star.

During his senior year of high school in 1994, he rushed for 1,840 yards and 31 touchdowns, while winning a Central Mass. Division 2 Super Bowl. He averaged 16.4 yards a carry for the season. Against Southbridge, he ran for 243 yards and four touchdowns on eight carries in the first half alone. Azumah won the Corsac Award for top offensive player in the legendary Thanksgiving Day game against St. John's Shrewsbury.

== College Career ==
Azumah attended the University of New Hampshire where he was a four-year starter on offense for Chip Kelly as an All-American tailback. One of the most decorated running backs in NCAA history, Azumah rushed for a national career-record 6,193 yards. At that time the only player in Division 1-AA history to rush for over 1,000+ yards four times. In 1999, Azumah was the first recipient of the Jim Urquhart Student-Athlete of the Year Award. This annual award is bestowed upon UNH senior student-athletes who excel both in athletic competition and the classroom, in addition to possessing sportsmanship, great character, and passion for sports.

He was Walter Payton Award recipient as the top offensive player in Division 1-AA football, while also earning honors as a unanimous All-American, All-Atlantic Ten Conference selection, and ECAC All-Star.

Azumah declared for the 1999 NFL Draft. He was invited to play in The Hula Bowl (one of four showcases for seniors) and received an invitation to the NFL Scouting Combine.

In 2005, Azumah was inducted into the New Hampshire Wildcats Athletic Council Hall of Fame.

On January 14, 2026, Azumah was inducted into the College Football Hall of Fame. Azumah is also the first player from the University of New Hampshire to be inducted, and the second individual, only to Bill Bowes.

== Professional Career ==
Pre-draft measurables
Height	Weight	Arm length	Hand span	40-yard dash	10-yard split	20-yard split	20-yard shuttle	Three-cone drill	Vertical jump	Broad jump	Bench press
5 ft 10 in (1.78 m)	205 lb (93 kg)	29 7/8 in (0.76 m)	8 7/8 in (0.23 m)	4.48 s	1.56 s	2.63 s	3.86 s	6.90 s	43.5 in (1.10 m)	11 ft 0 in (3.35 m)	15 reps
All values from NFL Combine

Azumah was selected by the Chicago Bears in the fifth round as the 147th pick of the 1999 NFL draft out of the University of New Hampshire. In Azumah's first year with the Chicago Bears, he won the prestigious Brian Piccolo Award. This award is given to a Chicago Bear by his teammates. Brian Piccolo played four seasons as a running back for the Chicago Bears from 1965 to 1968. Piccolo died from cancer in 1970 when he was just 26 years old. The Chicago Bears created the Brian Piccolo award to honor a teammate's courage, loyalty, teamwork and dedication.

Azumah, who was a running back in college, continued to make the transition into an NFL defensive back. As his NFL experience grew, he also saw time on special teams and special situations on defense. In 2001 Azumah was given a contract extension. On January 19, 2002, during the divisional playoff game versus the Philadelphia Eagles, Azumah intercepted then quarterback Donovan McNabb and returned the ball 39 yards for a touchdown. That was the last touchdown scored in old Soldier Field.

His best season came in 2003 when he led the league in kickoff returns with a twenty-nine-yard average and two touchdowns. In 2004, Azumah was selected to represent the NFC in the NFL Pro Bowl as a kick returner. In that game Azumah broke the record for return yards with 228. He also recovered a fumble.

For Azumah's career, he appeared in 105 games with 48 starts. He had 384 tackles, 10 interceptions, 29 pass defense, 6.5 sacks, 6 forced fumbles and one recovery. Azumah retired in March 2006.

== Post-NFL Career ==
Azumah has been seen on the Chicago Bears post-game coverage and commentary on WFLD-TV Fox Chicago, and he has appeared weekly on Fox Chicago's Good Day Chicago. Azumah started his television broadcasting career on Comcast SportsNet Chicago in 2006 as a post game analyst and feature reporter. Azumah also worked for ESPN 1000 radio in Chicago in 2010.

Azumah has a podcast, "To the Points With Jerry Azumah", where he breaks down prime time NFL matchups and discusses his weekly betting strategy.

== Philanthropic Activity ==
Azumah became a board member of the University of New Hampshire Foundation in 2001. The Foundation builds private support for the University of New Hampshire. In the summer of 2003, Azumah donated a six-figure gift to the Foundation which was directed to the university's athletic department. The Jerry Azumah Performance Center was a direct result of Azumah's gift. At age 25, Azumah became the youngest UNH alumnus to give a gift over $100,000.

In 2004 Azumah started the Azumah Student Assistance Program (ASAP). ASAP is a charitable 501(c)(3) organization and provides scholarships for disadvantaged students that attend private, secondary education. The program helps students in both Massachusetts and Illinois.

As a retired member of the Chicago Bears Football Club, Azumah joined the Board of Directors of Bears Care in 2006, the philanthropic arm of the Chicago Bears. Currently, Azumah is serving as the president of Bears Care, which was founded in 1989 and supports youth athletics, education, medical research and treatment programs for breast and ovarian cancer. In 2022, Azumah joined the Metropolitan Family Services Board of Directors. MFS's mission is to provide and mobilize the services needed to strengthen families and communities.

In 2023, Azumah joined the board of Gilda's Club, which is a community organization for people with cancer, as well as their families and friends.

Azumah was named a recipient of the prestigious 2024 NCAA Silver Anniversary Award. He was one of six former student-athletes honored for outstanding collegiate and professional achievements. The honor took place at the 2024 NCAA National Convention in Phoenix, Arizona.

== Personal life ==
Azumah has two children (Santiago and Valentino) with his wife Bianca. As of 2021, the Azumah family resides in Chicago, IL.
