= Memorial Union Building (New Hampshire) =

Building at University of New Hampshire

Coordinates: 43°08′04″N 70°55′51″W

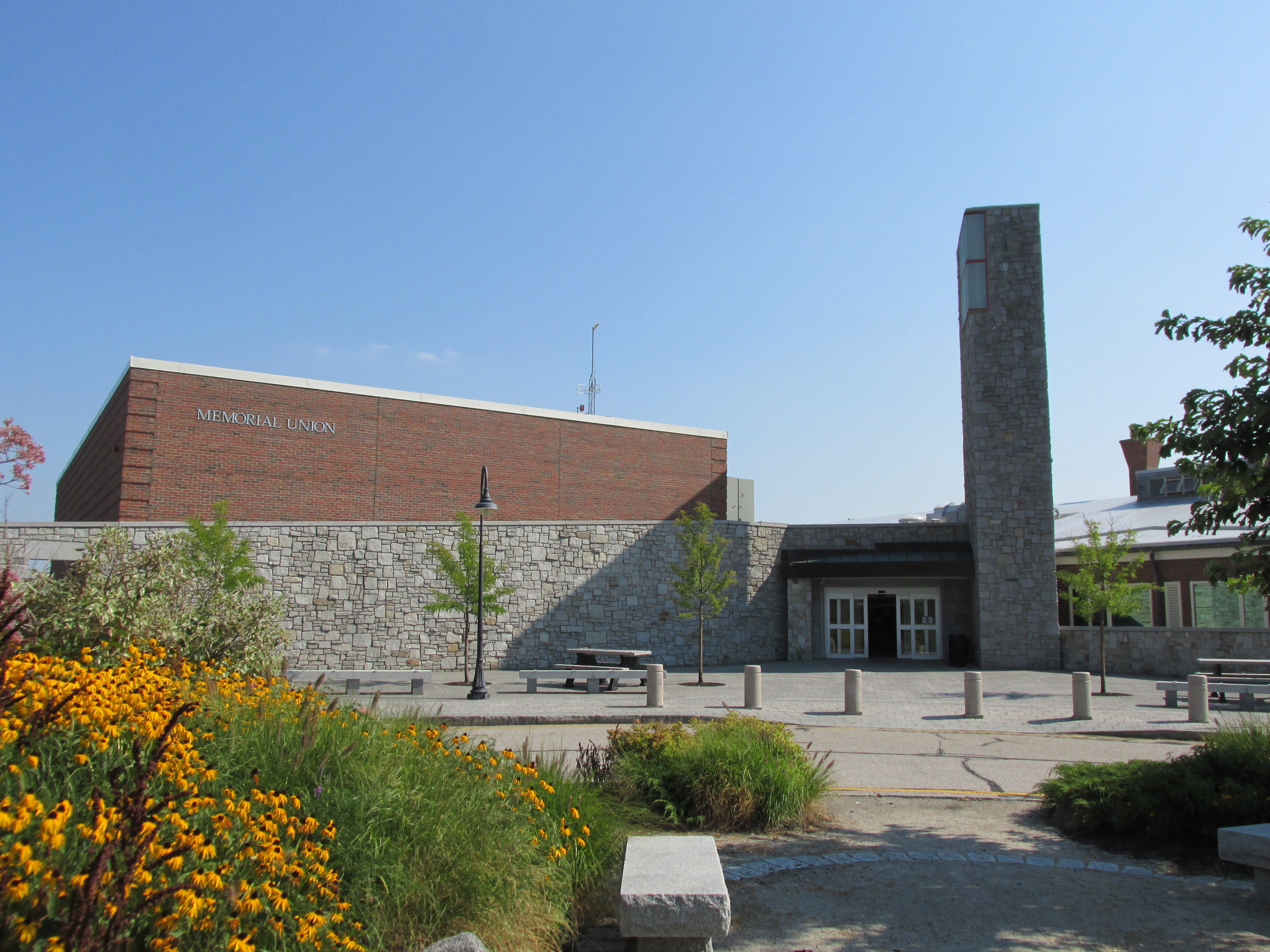
Memorial Union Building

The Memorial Union Building (MUB) is the University of New Hampshire's students' union building and the "heart of campus." The MUB is home to many student organizations, a mailroom, the university bookstore, event spaces, meeting rooms, lounges, and a game room. The building also serves as the official New Hampshire War Memorial for soldiers killed in action since World War I. Planning for a student union began in 1930s and fundraising began in 1945. The MUB was opened in 1957*. The building has been home to concerts, including an early Phish show in April 1989. In the 1990s, the MUB was renovated, and a dining hall, Holloway Commons, was added. The building is managed by the Memorial Union Board of Governors (MUBOG).
