= Anthony J. Burke =

American politician

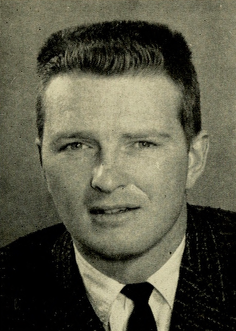
- Burke in 1967

Member of the Massachusetts House of Representatives
- In office 1959–1968

Personal details
- Born: July 17, 1931 Worcester, Massachusetts, U.S.
- Died: September 25, 1993 (aged 62) Worcester, Massachusetts, U.S.
- Party: Democratic
- Education: Boston University

Anthony J. Burke (July 17, 1931 – September 25, 1993) was an American politician. A member of the Democratic Party, he served in the Massachusetts House of Representatives from 1959 to 1968.

Burke died at the Brigham and Women's Hospital in Worcester, Massachusetts on September 25, 1993, at the age of 62.
