= Dover Transportation Center =

Train station in Dover, New Hampshire

Dover Transportation Center Dover, NH
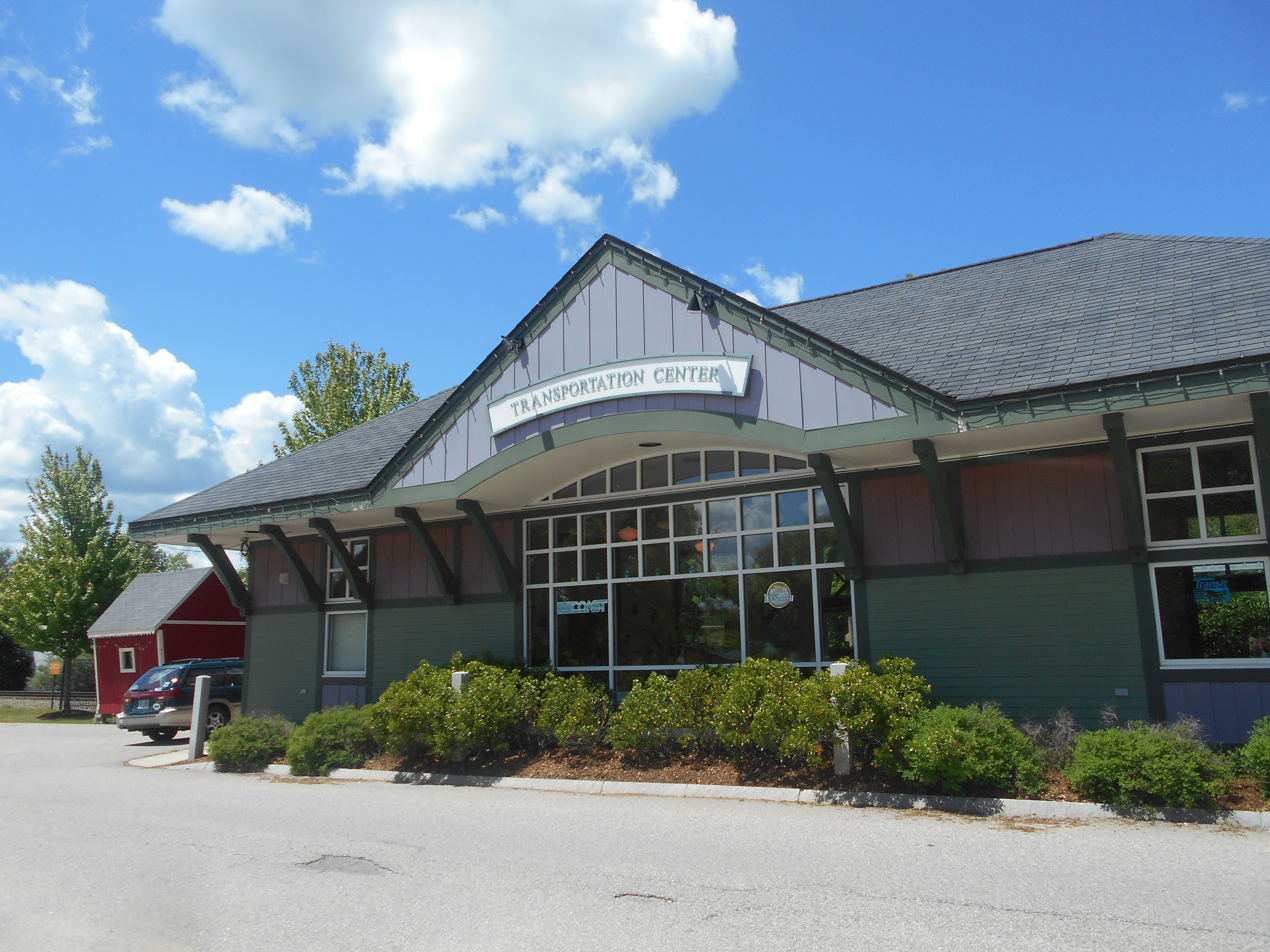
- Dover Transportation Center in June 2014

General information
- Location: 33 Chestnut Street; Dover, New Hampshire; United States
- Coordinates: 43°11′54″N 70°52′38″W
- Owner: Cocheco Mills (station); New Hampshire Department of Transportation (platform); CSX Transportation (track)
- Line: PAR Main Line
- Connections: COAST: 1, 12, 13, 33, 34; Wildcat Transit: Route 3

Construction
- Parking: Yes
- Accessible: Yes

Other information
- Station code: Amtrak: DOV

History
- Opened: 1842; December 15, 2001
- Closed: June 30, 1967
- Rebuilt: 1875

Passengers
- FY 2025: 57,772 (Amtrak)

Services
| Preceding station | Amtrak | Following station |
|---|---|---|
| Durham–UNH toward Boston North | Downeaster | Wells toward Brunswick |
Former services
| Preceding station | Boston and Maine Railroad | Following station |
|---|---|---|
| Durham toward Boston | Western Route | South Berwick toward Portland |
| Durham toward Boston | Boston – Dover until 1967 | Terminus |
Location

Dover Transportation Center is an Amtrak train station in Dover, New Hampshire, United States. The station is served by five daily Downeaster round trips. An average of 150 passengers board or alight at Dover daily, making it the second-busiest stop in New Hampshire.

== History ==
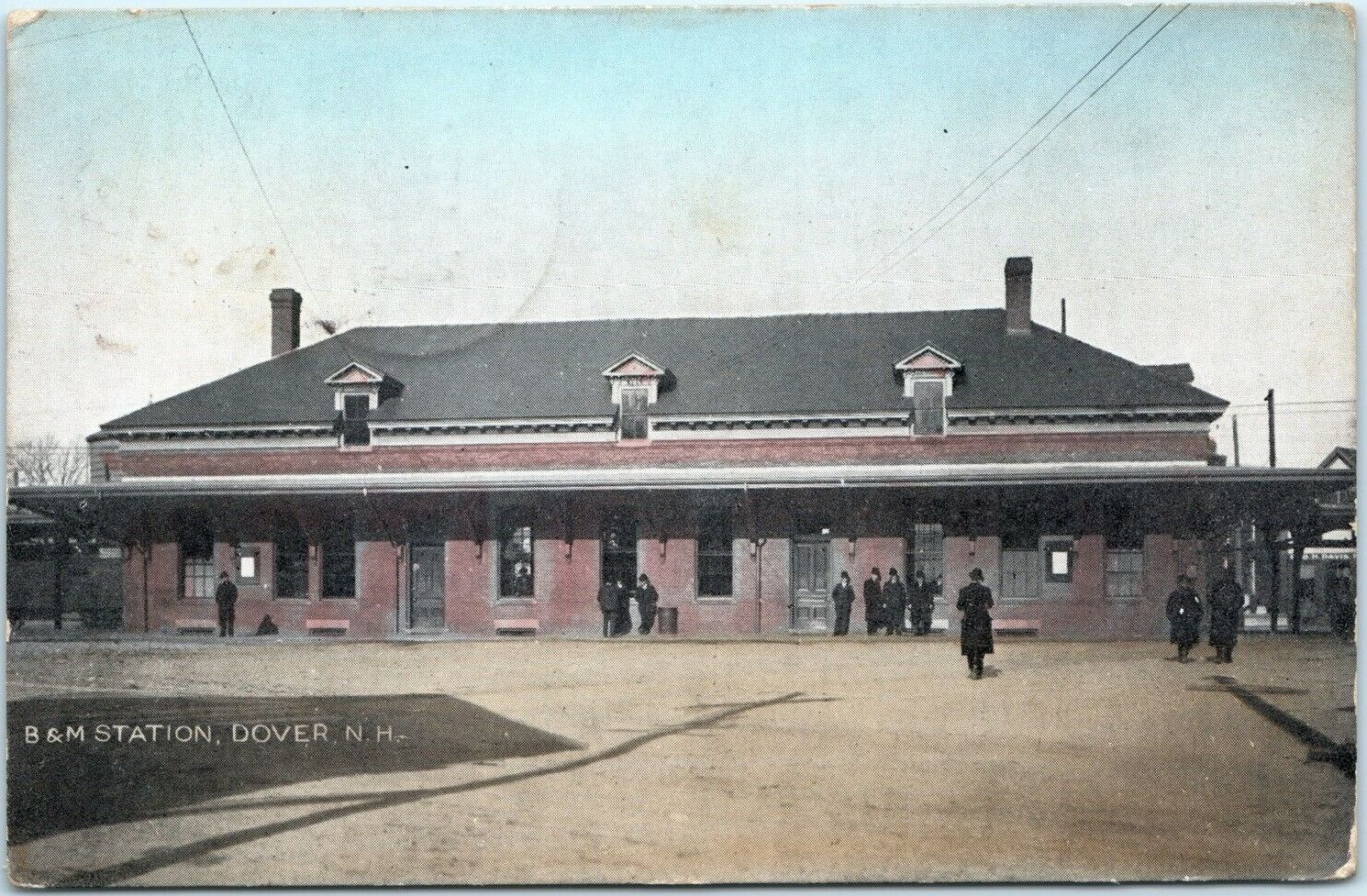
The 1874-built station around 1909

The Boston & Maine Railroad (B&M) opened its first Dover station, a wood-frame structure with a small train shed, in 1842. It was replaced by a one-story brick structure on July 15, 1874. The B&M ran intercity service to Portland, Maine on its Western Route (now the Pan Am Railways mainline) until January 4, 1965. After Portland service ended, a single commute-hour round trip to Dover ran until June 30, 1967, when it was cut back to Haverhill, Massachusetts.

A new station building was constructed for the introduction of Downeaster service in December 2001. C&J Trailways originally used the building, but later constructed their bus station closer to New Hampshire Route 16. In October 2018, the city approved a five-year lease of the building to a bagel shop.

== Bus connections ==
Bus service is provided by COAST to locations within Dover and the Seacoast Region of New Hampshire as well as UNH Wildcat Transit to Durham and the University of New Hampshire.
