= UNH Alma Mater =

Alma mater (song) of the University of New Hampshire in Durham, New Hampshire

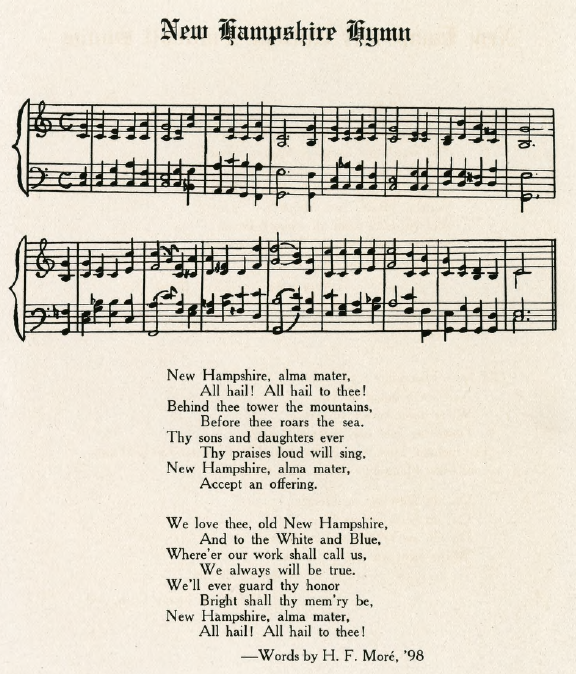
Lyrics as published in The Granite 1909 edition and credited to H. F. More (sic)

The "UNH Alma Mater" is the official alma mater of the University of New Hampshire in Durham, New Hampshire. The lyrics to the song were written by Herbert Fisher Moore, an 1898 graduate of the school, and are sung to the tune "Lancashire" (also known as "Lead On, O King Eternal") by Henry Smart.

== History ==
In February 1898—when the school was still New Hampshire College of Agriculture and the Mechanic Arts—The New Hampshire College Monthly published an editorial requesting a college song. It offered a $10 prize, outlining rules and stating that judges could "reject all contributions if none are... suitable". In April, the College Monthly reported that the judges felt the contributions received "were hardly suited" to be adopted as the college song.

In October 1903, the College Monthly published a "College Song" sung to "Fair Harvard", with New Hampshire-oriented lyrics—the opening line was "New Hampshire, thy sons and thy daughters return".

The date of first publication of the current alma mater is unclear. Under the title "New Hampshire Hymn", the words were included in the inaugural (1909) edition of The Granite, the school's college yearbook, published in May 1908.

== Lyrics ==
New Hampshire, alma mater,
All hail, all hail to thee!
Behind thee tow'r the mountains,
Before thee roars the sea.
Thy sons and daughters ever
Thy praises loud will sing.
New Hampshire, alma mater,
Accept our offering. (Note: The 1909 edition of The Granite has this line as "Accept an offering.")

We love thee, old New Hampshire,
And to the White and Blue,
Where'er our work shall call us,
We always will be true.
We'll ever guard thy honor,
Bright shall thy mem'ry be.
New Hampshire, alma mater,
All hail, all hail to thee!

== See also ==
- "On to Victory" – the school's fight song
