= University of New Hampshire Observatory =

Observatory in New Hampshire, US

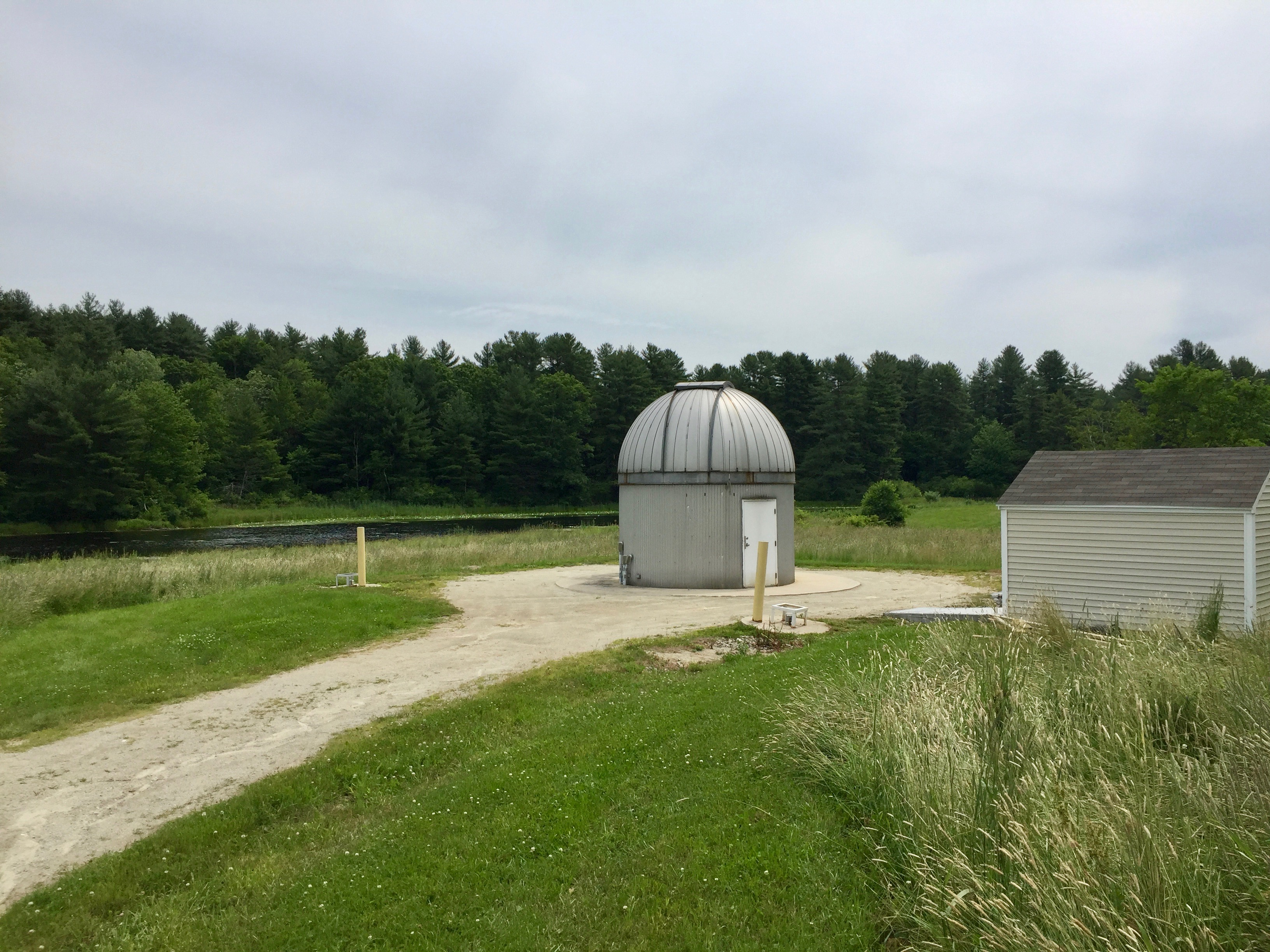
- Organization: University of New Hampshire
- Location: Durham, New Hampshire
- Coordinates: 43.1465°N 70.9438°W
- Altitude: 31 meters (102 ft)
- Established: 1984
- Website: physics.unh.edu/observatory

Telescopes
- unnamed telescope: 0.35 m reflector

University of New Hampshire Observatory is an astronomical observatory owned and operated by the University of New Hampshire. It is located in Durham, New Hampshire (USA) near the old Durham Reservoir. The main telescope is a 0.35 m (14 in) Schmidt–Cassegrain reflecting telescope donated to the observatory in 1984. It is used only for educational purposes.

== See also ==
- List of observatories
