= On to Victory =

On to Victory may refer to:

- On to Victory (album), a 1980 album by Humble Pie
- "On to Victory" (song), the fight song for the University of New Hampshire
