= Reagan Baughman =

American economist

- Education: Drew University; Syracuse University
- Occupation: Economist

Reagan Baughman is an American economist. She is the John A. Hogan Distinguished Professor in the department of economics at the University of New Hampshire.
