= Benjamin Thompson (farmer) =

- Born: April 22, 1806; Durham, New Hampshire, U.S.
- Died: January 31, 1890 (aged 83); Durham, New Hampshire, U.S.
- Occupation(s): Farmer, businessman
- Known for: Main benefactor of the University of New Hampshire

Benjamin Thompson (April 22, 1806 – January 31, 1890) was an American farmer and businessman, remembered as the main benefactor of the present-day University of New Hampshire, located in Durham, New Hampshire.

== Biography ==
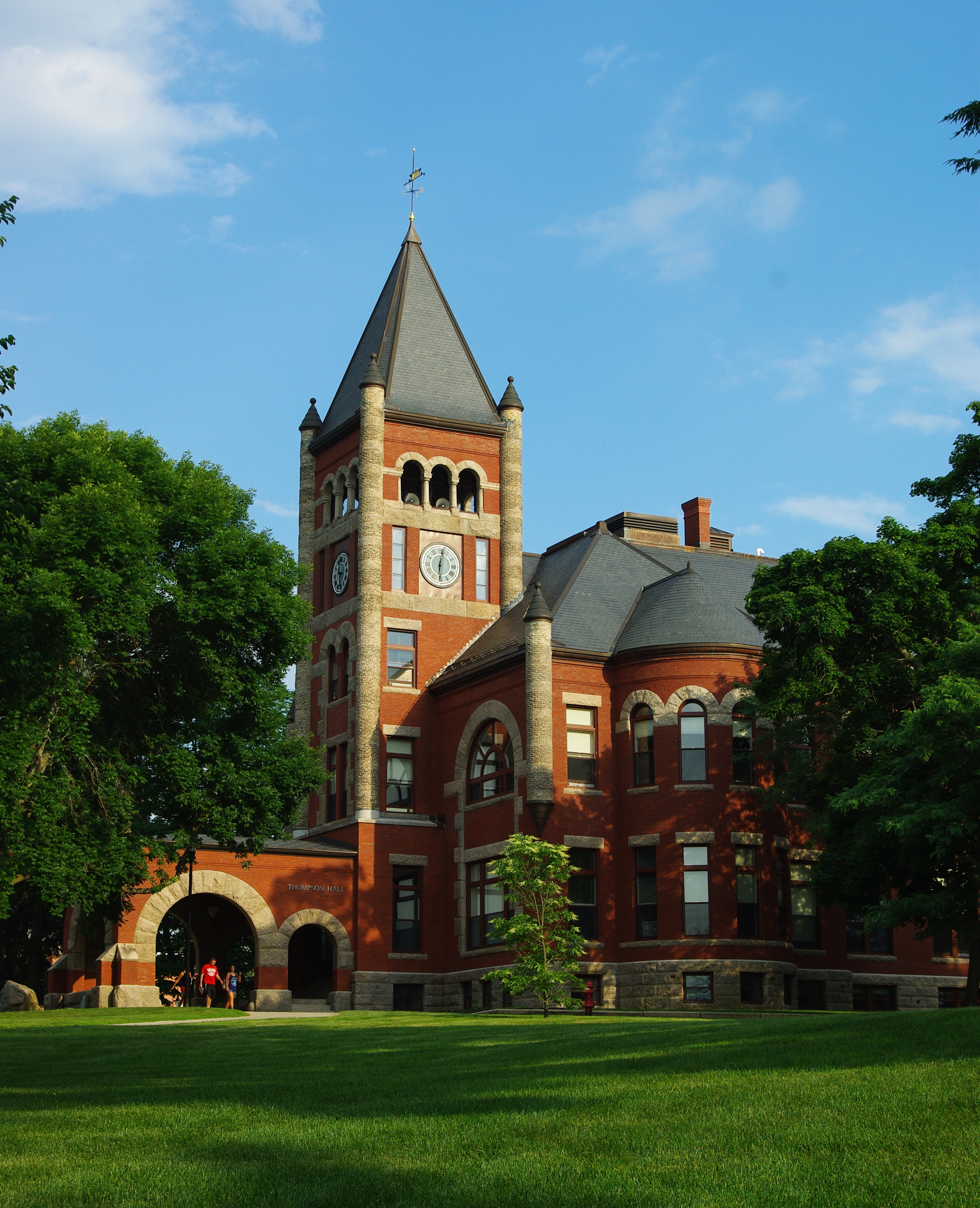
Thompson Hall

Thompson was the son of Benjamin Thompson Sr. and Mary Pickering.

Upon his death in 1890, Thompson left the State of New Hampshire his farm and other properties in Durham. He also left Warner Farm, which was originally part of the Valentine Hill grant at Oyster River. His total assets gifted totaled over $400,000 ($14 million in 2024).

Thompson specified that the money and properties were to be used to establish an agricultural college. The New Hampshire College of Agriculture and the Mechanic Arts, which was already established in Hanover, New Hampshire, was moved to Thompson's property in Durham in 1893. The first building constructed, in the center of the new campus, was named Thompson Hall in his honor. For many years, its profile was used by the school on all documents and memorabilia; it now houses some administrative offices.

The college became the University of New Hampshire in 1923.
