= Durham–UNH station =

Train station in Durham, New Hampshire

Durham–UNH
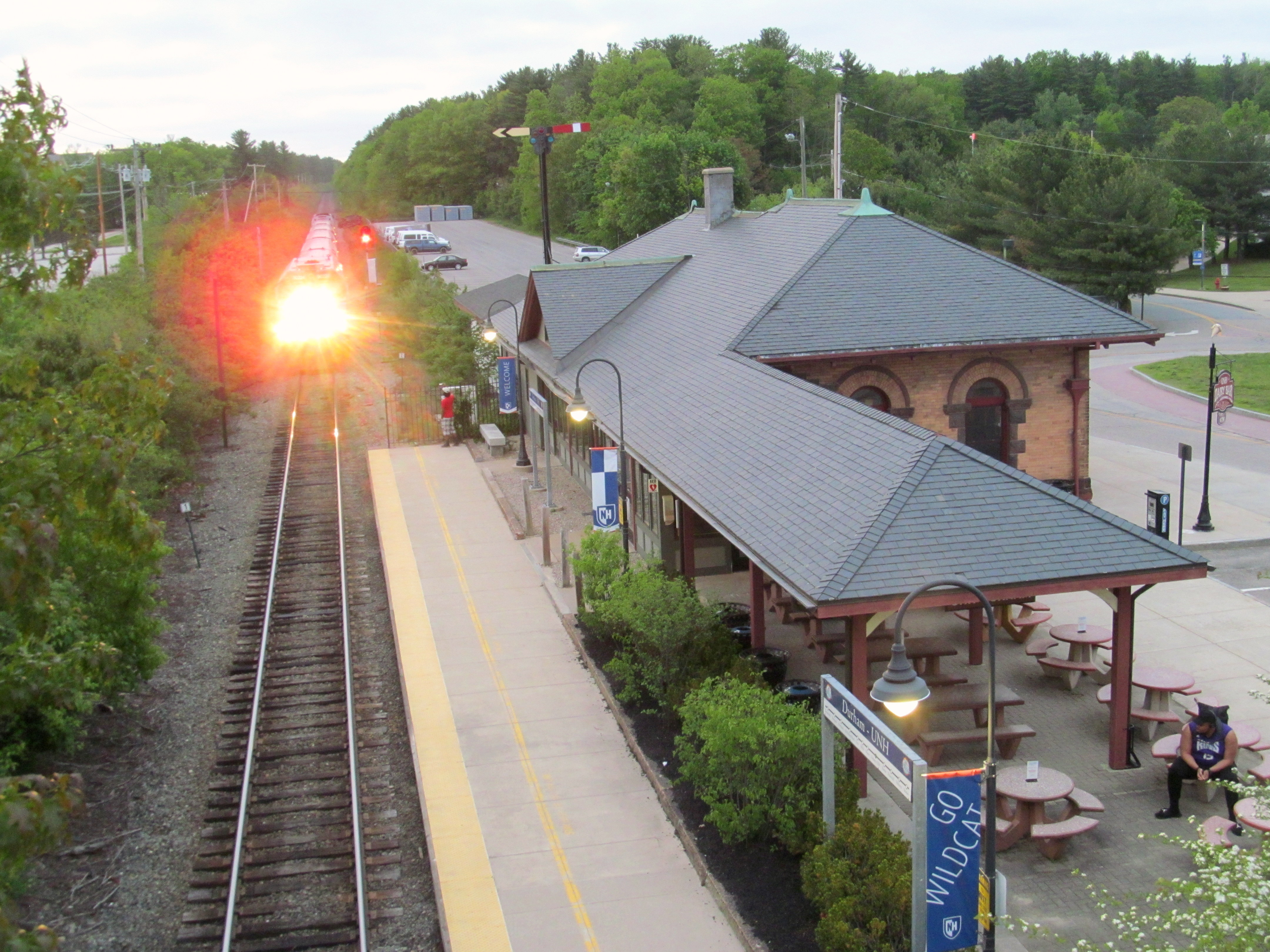
- Downeaster arriving at Durham–UNH station in 2017

General information
- Location: 3 Depot Street; Durham, New Hampshire; United States
- Coordinates: 43.1393669°N 70.9409891°W
- Owner: University of New Hampshire
- Line: PAR Western Route
- Platforms: 1 side platform
- Tracks: 1
- Connections: UNH Wildcat Buses

Construction
- Parking: Yes
- Cycle facilities: Racks
- Accessible: Yes

Other information
- Station code: Amtrak: DHM

History
- Opened: 1912 (B&M); December 14, 2001 (Amtrak)
- Closed: June 30, 1967
- Rebuilt: 2008

Passengers
- FY 2025: 48,248 (Amtrak)

Services
Preceding station	Amtrak	Following station
Exeter toward Boston North	Downeaster	Dover toward Brunswick
Former services
Preceding station	Boston and Maine Railroad	Following station
Newmarket toward Boston	Western Route	Dover toward Portland
Newmarket toward Boston	Boston – Dover until 1967	Dover Terminus
Location

Durham–University of New Hampshire station, also known as Durham–UNH station or simply Durham station, is a passenger rail station in Durham, New Hampshire, served by Amtrak's Downeaster line. The historic depot, which now houses the UNH Dairy Bar, is situated just west of downtown Durham on the campus of the University of New Hampshire (UNH). The station is owned by the university, but an adjacent parking area is managed by the town of Durham. On average, about 161 rail passengers board or detrain daily at Durham, making it the third-busiest Amtrak stop in New Hampshire.

== Service ==
Durham is served by five Downeaster trains in each direction daily. Durham is approximately one hour by train from Portland and ninety minutes from Boston. UNH students and Durham residents comprise most of the riders, as the lack of parking available to the general public means most commuters drive to and park at Dover or Exeter, the stations north and south respectively of Durham.

The university operates both a free on-campus bus shuttle service, Campus Connector Shuttle, and Wildcat Transit, an off-campus service, serving the cities and towns of Dover, Lee, Madbury, Newmarket, Newington, and Portsmouth. The bus services operate year-round but scale back outside of the academic year. There is a Wildcat Transit and UNH Campus Connector bus stop approximately 1,000 feet (300 m) from the platform on Main Street.

== History ==
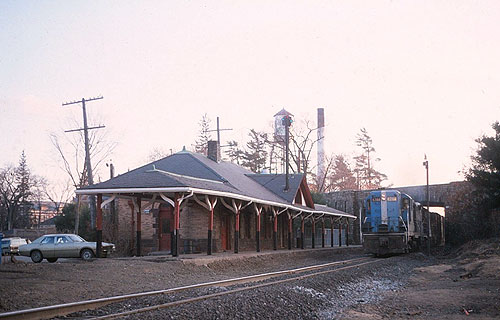
A B&M freight train passes the unused Durham station in 1976.

The Boston and Maine Railroad (B&M) began service to Durham in 1841, and by the end of the 19th century included 7 to 12 trains per day. The tracks through Durham originally followed a course slightly east of the current alignment, with a station at Main Street. On January 22, 1905, an express train derailed in downtown Durham, injuring 11 passengers and prompting concerns about future crashes in the downtown area. In 1912, prompted by the town and the need to add a second track, the railroad moved its tracks further west away from downtown. Edgewood Road is now built on the former right of way. The B&M disassembled the underused 1896-built East Lynn station in Lynn, Massachusetts, and rebuilt it on the new alignment at Durham.

In 1958, the B&M was approved to discontinue all its interstate passenger services. The station was sold by the B&M to UNH for $1 in 1960 and soon converted to an ice cream bar. On January 4, 1965, the railroad discontinued all service outside Massachusetts except for single round trips to Concord and Dover, the latter of which served Durham. On June 30, 1967, the Concord trip was cut back to Lowell and the Dover trip to Haverhill, ending service to Durham.

Regular passenger service returned with the opening of the Downeaster on December 14, 2001. The depot was maintained as a restaurant and renovated in 2007-2008 by the university with funding assistance from the United States Department of Transportation. It reopened on August 11, 2008, featuring an upgraded Dairy Bar (a restaurant operated by UNH Hospitality Services).
