= Thompson Hall (University of New Hampshire) =

- U.S. National Register of Historic Places
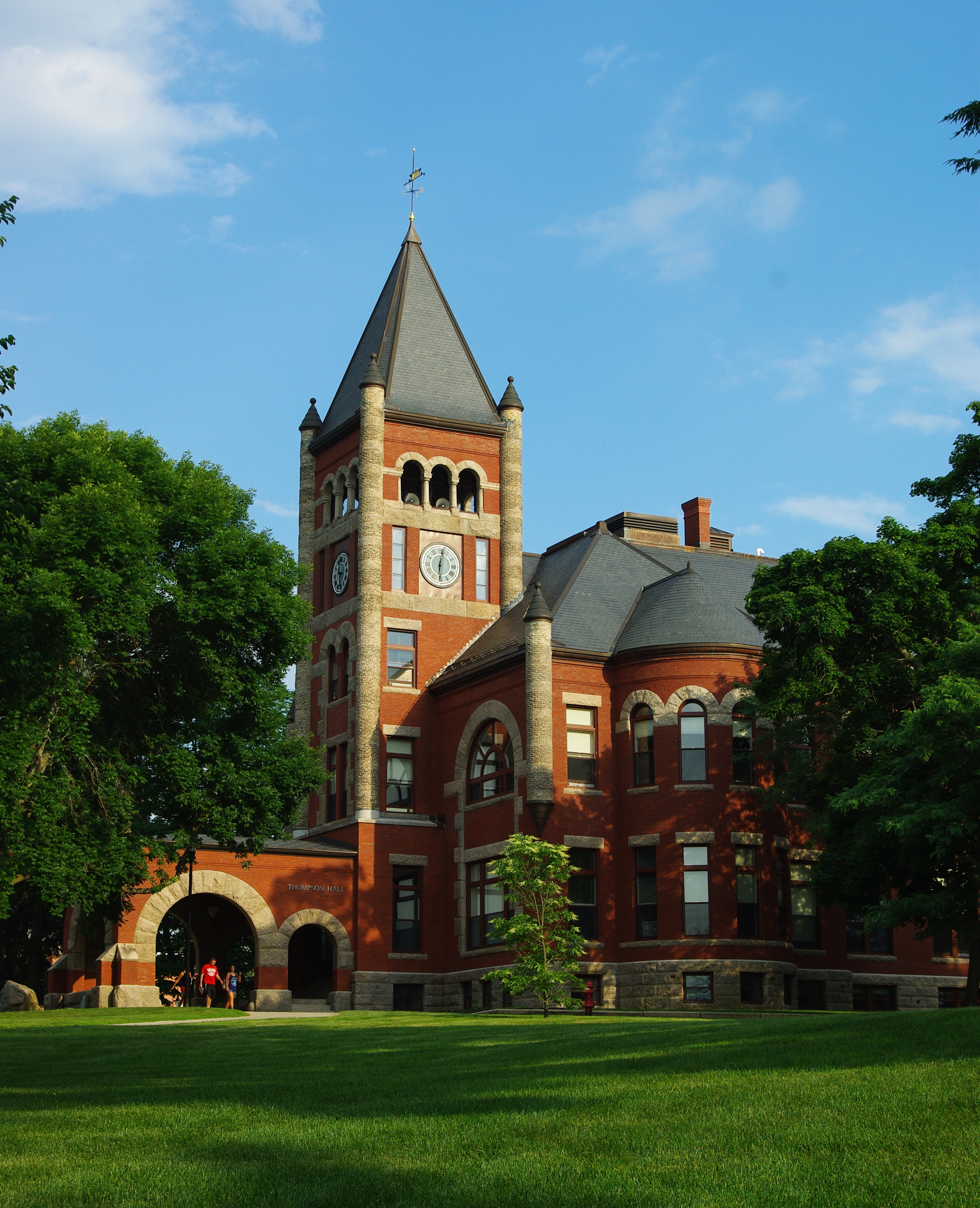

- Location within New Hampshire Location within the United States
- Location: 105 Main St., University of New Hampshire campus, Durham, New Hampshire
- Coordinates: 43°8′9″N 70°55′59″W
- Area: less than one acre
- Architect: Dow & Randlett
- Architectural style: Romanesque
- NRHP reference No.: 96001468
- Added to NRHP: December 6, 1996

Thompson Hall, commonly referred to locally as "T-Hall", is one of the central buildings on the campus of the University of New Hampshire in Durham, New Hampshire, United States. A large brick and stone building, it was designed by Concord architects Dow & Randlett and built in 1892. It was the first building to be built on the Durham campus, and was named for Benjamin Thompson, a farmer who left his entire Durham estate to the state for use as the college campus. The building was listed on the National Register of Historic Places in 1996.

== Architecture ==
Thompson Hall is a Romanesque Revival structure set on a knoll just south of Main Street, with a broad expanse of lawn in between. Its features are characteristic of the style, with heavy massing, granite trim, and a tall clock tower. Although it is nominally 2-1/2 stories in height, it has a raised basement below, and its slate hip roof is pierced by gables, giving four usable stories of space. The tower is a massive square structure, rising five stories to a pyramidal roof, and features an electronic carillon installed in 1952, and a Howard clock donated by the architects. The main block and tower have round turrets projecting from their corners.

== History ==
Thompson Hall was the first building to be built on the new campus of the New Hampshire College of Agricultural and Mechanical Arts, which had been founded in 1866 as a land grant college and was previously located near the Dartmouth College campus in Hanover. Benjamin Thompson, a Durham farmer, died 1890, leaving an estate worth $400,000, with 253 acres (102 ha) of land, to the state for use as an agricultural school. The state accepted his gift, and construction of Thompson Hall began in 1891, with a landscape plan for the campus developed by Charles Eliot. The unfinished hall was the site of graduation in spring 1893, and was formally opened for classes that fall.

The hall has housed the college president's office since its construction, and its other spaces have seen a wide variety of uses. At first it housed all of the college facilities, including classrooms, laboratories, a library, and a gymnasium. The gymnasium moved into a new building in 1899 and the library moved out in 1907. Over the following decades it came to house more administrative offices, as academic facilities moved to new buildings. In 1952, the building's single bell was replaced by an electronic carillon. The interior was extensively altered in 1986, retaining only a few rooms in their original appearance; one of these houses had museum displays relating to the university's history.

== In popular culture ==
In the television series The Flash, Thompson Hall is used for an exterior shot of Central City University.

== See also ==
- National Register of Historic Places listings in Strafford County, New Hampshire
