= Henry Smart =

English organist and composer (1813–1879)

- Born: 26 October 1813; London, England
- Died: 6 July 1879 (aged 65); London, England
- Occupations: Organist, composer
- Known for: "Regent Square"

Henry Thomas Smart (26 October 1813 – 6 July 1879) was an English organist and composer.

== Biography ==
Smart was born in London, a nephew of the conductor Sir George Smart and son of a music publisher, orchestra director and accomplished violinist (also called Henry Smart). His sister was the artist and composer Harriet Anne Smart. He was educated at Highgate School, and then studied for the law, but soon gave this up for music.

In 1831, Smart became organist of Blackburn parish church, where he wrote his first important work, an anthem; then of St Giles-without-Cripplegate; St Luke's, Old Street; and finally of St Pancras New Church, in 1864, which last post he held at the time of his death, less than a month after receiving a government pension of £100 per annum. Smart was also skilled as a mechanic, and designed several organs. He was also invited by William Sterndale Bennett to join the Committee of his Bach Society leading to the first English performance of Bach's St Matthew Passion in 1854.

Though highly rated as a composer by his English contemporaries, Smart is now largely forgotten, save for his hymn tune "Regent Square", which retains considerable popularity, and which is commonly performed with the words "Christ is Made the Sure Foundation", "Light's Abode, Celestial Salem", or "Angels from the Realms of Glory". Another of his tunes, 'Misericordia', is set to the hymn Just As I Am (hymn) by Charlotte Elliott 1789-1871. His many compositions for the organ (some of which have been occasionally revived in recent years) were described as "effective and melodious, if not strikingly original" in the Encyclopædia Britannica Eleventh Edition (1911), which also praised his part songs. A cantata by him, "The Bride of Dunkerron" was written for the Birmingham Festival of 1864; another cantata was a version of the play King René's Daughter (1871). The oratorio Jacob was created for Glasgow in 1873; and his comic opera Bertha or The Gnome of Hartzburg was produced with some success at the Haymarket in June 1855.

Harry Emerson Fosdick greatly admired "Regent Square", and wrote his own "God of Grace and God of Glory" specifically in the hope that it would be generally sung to that tune. He was horrified when, in 1935, The Methodist Hymnal instead set the lyrics to John Hughes' "Cwm Rhondda".

In the last 15 years of his life, Smart was practically blind. He composed by dictation, primarily to his daughter Ellen, who was married to Joseph Joachim's brother Henry Joachim. Smart died at his residence near Primrose Hill in London in July 1879.

== See also ==
- UNH Alma Mater
