= New Hampshire College of Agriculture and the Mechanic Arts =

Former land-grant college founded in 1866.

- College seal, from the 1912 edition of The Granite yearbook
- Type: Public college
- Established: Hanover, New Hampshire (1866)
- Relocated: Durham, New Hampshire (1893)
- Renamed: University of New Hampshire (1923)

New Hampshire College of Agriculture and the Mechanic Arts (NHC) was founded and incorporated in 1866, as a land grant college in Hanover in connection with Dartmouth College. In 1893, NHC moved to Durham, where it became the University of New Hampshire (UNH) in 1923, by an act of the New Hampshire General Court.

== History ==
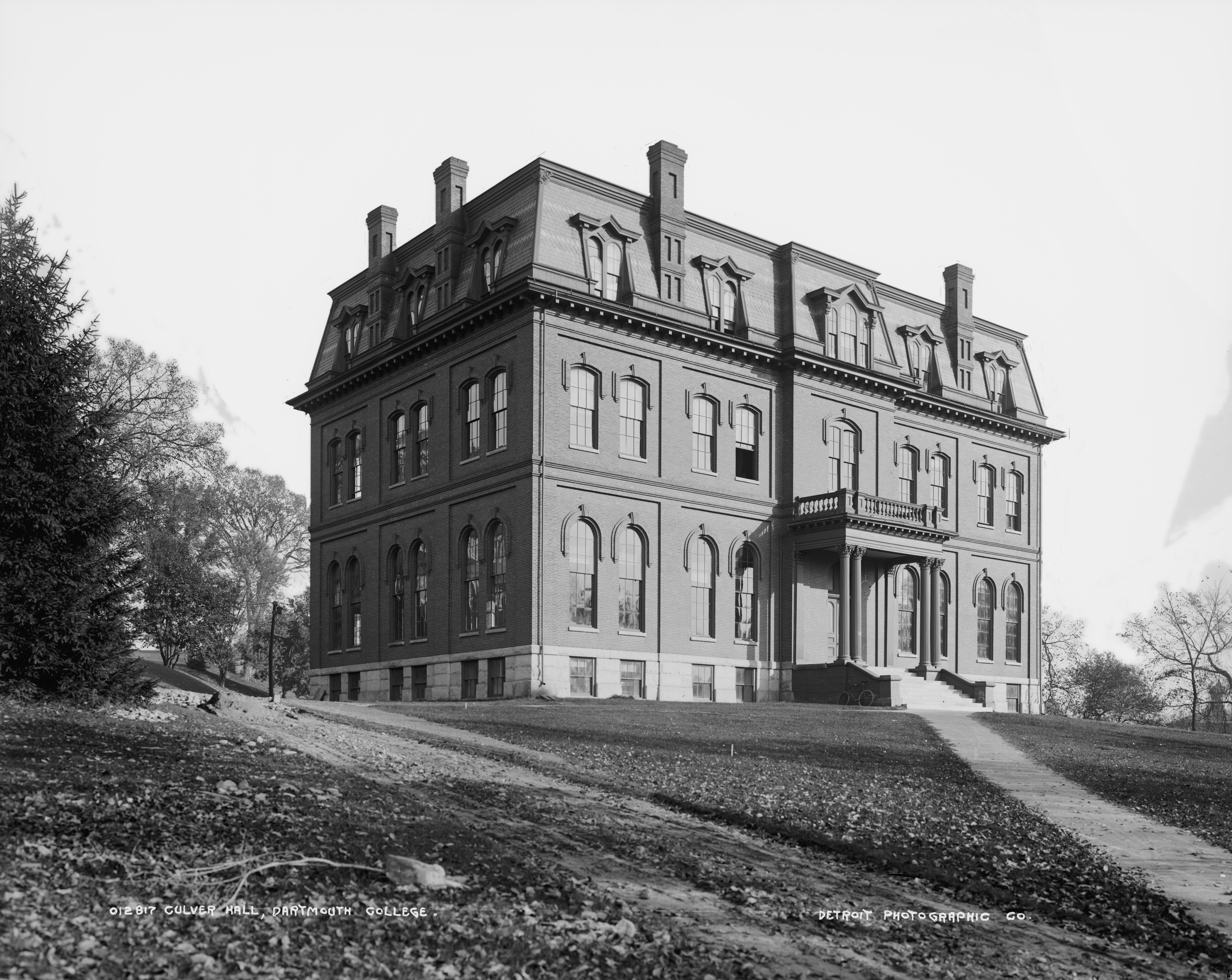
Culver Hall in Hanover, New Hampshire, was the first building of the college. (Constructed 1871–72, demolished 1929.)

The Morrill Act of 1862 granted federal lands to New Hampshire for the establishment of an agricultural-mechanical college. The state incorporated New Hampshire College in 1866 and opened the college in 1868 in Hanover. The institution was officially associated with Dartmouth College and was directed by Dartmouth's president.

Durham resident Benjamin Thompson left his farm and assets to the state for the establishment of an agricultural college. On January 30, 1890, Thompson died and his will became public. On March 5, 1891, Governor Hiram A. Tuttle signed an act accepting the conditions of Thompson's will. On April 10, 1891, Tuttle signed a bill authorizing the college's move to Durham.

Excited about the pending move to Durham, the Class of 1892 held commencement exercises in an unfinished barn on the Durham campus. On April 18, 1892, the Board of Trustees voted to "authorize the faculty to make all the arrangements for the packing and removal of college property at Hanover to Durham." In fall of 1893, classes began in Durham with 51 freshmen and 13 upperclassmen, and graduate study was established.

In December 1910, the student newspaper, The New Hampshire College Monthly, advocated a name change for the college, as the original name suggested "a rather limited scheme of education". A bill in the New Hampshire legislature to change the name was defeated in February 1911—one newspaper reported "the idea wasn't popular in the rural districts." Twelve years later, in 1923, Governor Fred H. Brown signed a bill changing the name of the college to University of New Hampshire. The university was incorporated on July 1, 1923.
