= University of New Hampshire =

University in Durham, New Hampshire, US

- Former names: New Hampshire College of Agriculture and the Mechanic Arts (1866-1923)
- Motto: "Science, Arts, Industry"
- Type: Public land-grant research university
- Established: 1866; 160 years ago
- Parent institution: University System of New Hampshire
- Accreditation: NECHE
- Academic affiliations: UArctic; Sea-grant; Space-grant
- Endowment: $1.06 billion (2025)(system-wide)
- President: Elizabeth S. Chilton
- Provost: Jeanette E. Riley
- Academic staff: 997 (2019)
- Students: 14,784 (2019)
- Undergraduates: 12,202 (2019)
- Postgraduates: 2,582 (2019)
- Location: Durham, New Hampshire, United States; 43°08′11″N 70°55′56″W
- Campus: 2,600 acres (11 km^{2}); Small suburb
- Other campuses: Concord; Manchester
- Newspaper: The New Hampshire
- Colors: UNH Wildcat Blue and Fresh Snow
- Nickname: Wildcats
- Sporting affiliations: NCAA Division I FCS – AmEast; CAA Football; Hockey East; EAGL; EISA; CAA; NEISA
- Mascots: Wild E. Cat and Gnarlz
- Website: unh.edu

The University of New Hampshire (UNH) is a public land-grant research university with its main campus in Durham, New Hampshire, United States. It was founded and incorporated in 1866 as a land grant college in Hanover, moved to Durham in 1893, and adopted its current name in 1923.

The university's Durham campus comprises six colleges. A seventh college, the University of New Hampshire at Manchester, occupies the university's campus in Manchester. The University of New Hampshire School of Law is in Concord, the state's capital. The university is part of the University System of New Hampshire and is classified among "R1: Doctoral Universities – Very high research activity".

As of 2018, its combined campuses made UNH the largest state university system in the state of New Hampshire, with over 15,000 students. It was also the most expensive state-sponsored school in the United States for in-state students.

== History ==
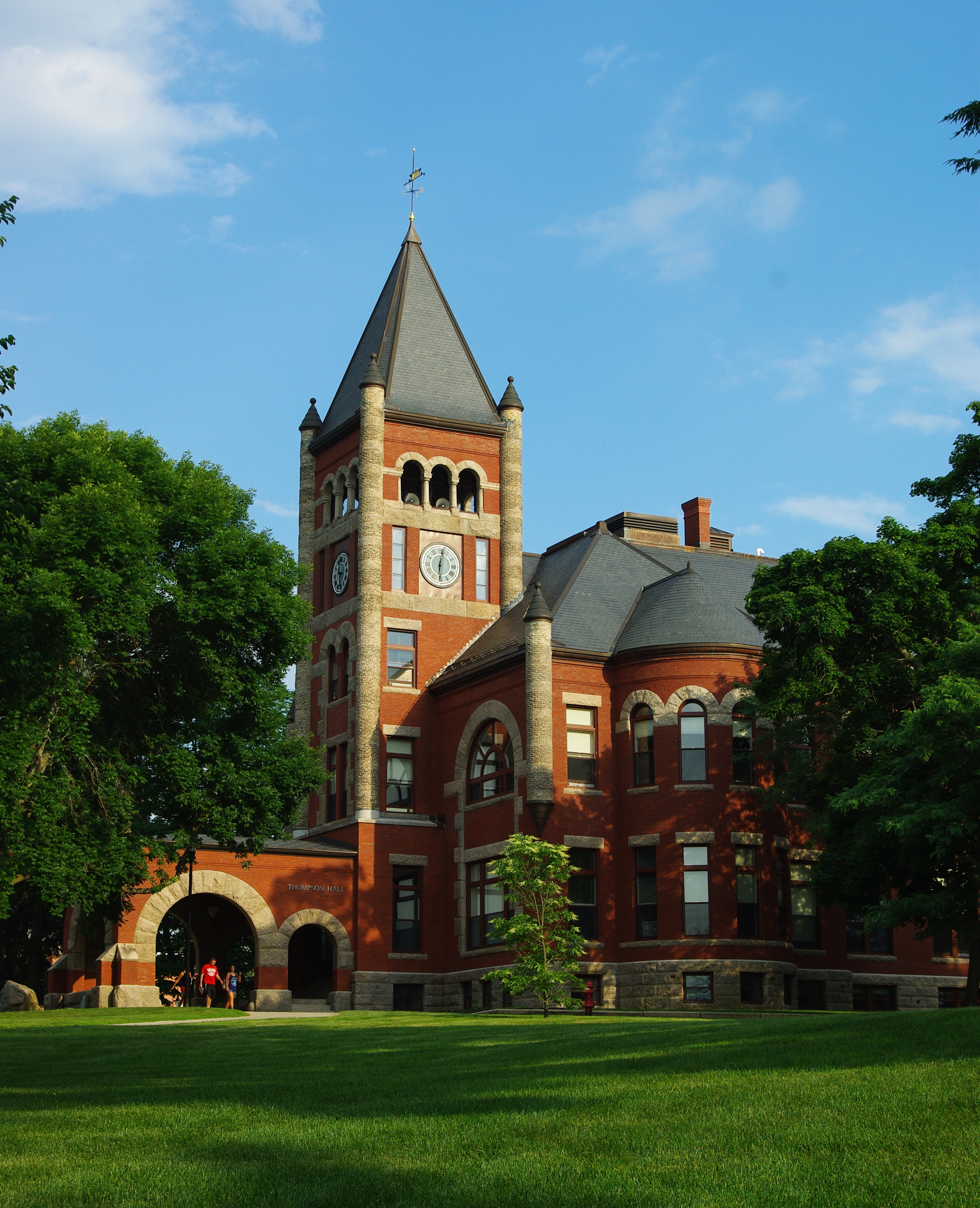
Thompson Hall, built in 1892, is listed on the National Register of Historic Places.

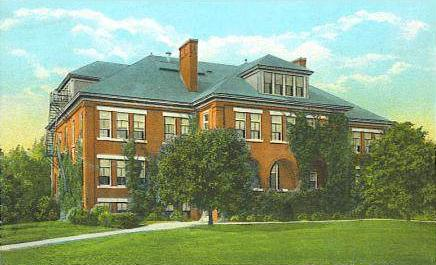
Morrill Hall c. 1920

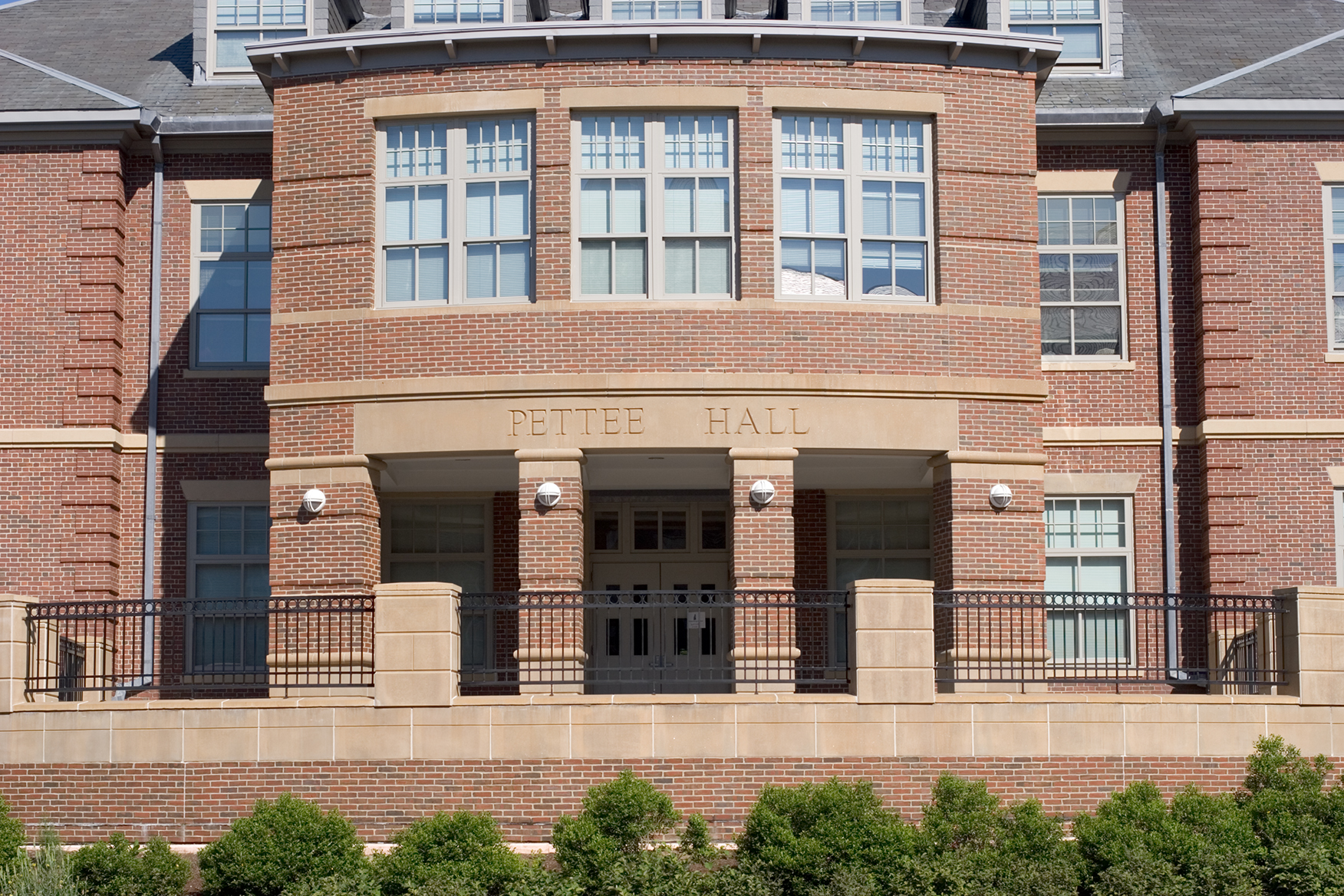
Pettee Hall c. 2005

The Morrill Act of 1862 granted federal lands to New Hampshire for the establishment of an agricultural-mechanical college. In 1866, the university was first incorporated as the New Hampshire College of Agriculture and the Mechanic Arts in Hanover, New Hampshire, in association with Dartmouth College. The institution was officially associated with Dartmouth College and was directed by Dartmouth's president. Durham resident Benjamin Thompson left his farm and assets to the state for the establishment of an agricultural college. On January 30, 1890, Benjamin Thompson died and his will became public. On March 5, 1891, Governor Hiram A. Tuttle signed an act accepting the conditions of Thompson's will. On April 10, 1891, Governor Tuttle signed a bill authorizing the college's move to Durham, New Hampshire.

In 1892, the Board of Trustees hired Charles Eliot to create a site plan for the first five campus buildings: Thompson, Conant, Nesmith, and Hewitt Shops (now called Halls) and the Dairy Barn. Eliot visited Durham and worked for three months to develop the plan before the college's relocation. The Class of 1892, excited about the move to Durham, held their commencement exercises in an unfinished barn on the new campus. On April 18, 1892, the Board of Trustees voted to "authorize the faculty to make all the arrangements for the packing and removal of college property at Hanover to Durham." The Class of 1893 followed the previous class and held commencement exercises in unfinished Thompson Hall, the Romanesque Revival campus centerpiece designed by the prominent Concord architectural firm of Dow & Randlett.

In fall 1893, classes officially began in Durham with 51 freshmen and 13 upperclassmen, which was three times the projected enrollment. Graduate study was also established in the fall of 1893 for the first time. The number of students and the lack of state funds for dormitories caused a housing crunch and forced students to find housing in town. The lack of housing caused difficulty in attracting women to the university. In 1908, construction on Smith Hall, the first women's dorm, was completed using private and state funds. Before the construction of Fairchild Hall in 1915 for male students, 50 freshmen lived in the basement of DeMerritt Hall. With the continuing housing shortage for men, the administration encouraged the growth of the UNH Greek system. From the late 1910s through the 1930s, the fraternity system expanded and provided room and board for male students.

In 1919, supervising architect Eric T. Huddleston prepared a master plan for the campus, which guided development of the school for the next thirty years. As supervising architect Huddleston is credited with the design of over a dozen campus buildings. In 1923, Governor Fred H. Brown signed a bill changing the name of the college to the University of New Hampshire. The university was incorporated on July 1, 1923.

In the spring of 2015, the university was given $4 million from the estate of Robert Morin, who had been a librarian at the university for almost 50 years. Having lived a frugal and secluded life, he allowed for his life's savings to be given to the university without restraint. In 2016, the news that the university was spending $1 million on a new video screen for the football stadium provoked criticism, both on and off campus. Critics thought that the difference between that amount and the $100,000 the university transferred to the library was inappropriate.

== Academics ==
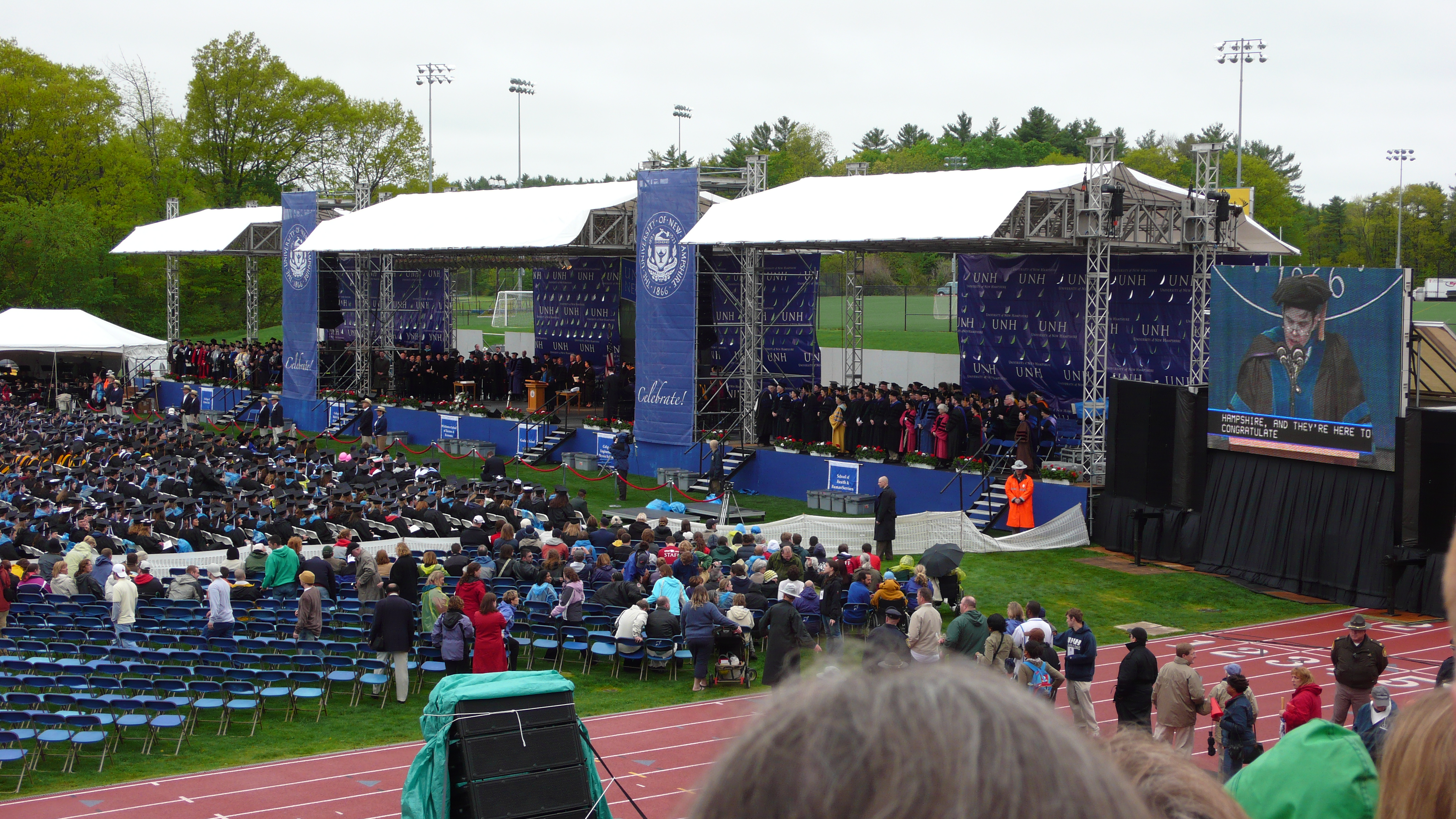
Commencement ceremonies at the University of New Hampshire, on May 19, 2007

The University of New Hampshire is the flagship of the University System of New Hampshire. UNH is composed of eleven colleges and graduate schools, offering 2,000 courses in over 100 majors. The eleven colleges of UNH are:

- College of Engineering and Physical Sciences (CEPS)
- College of Liberal Arts (COLA)
- College of Life Sciences and Agriculture (COLSA)
- Thompson School of Applied Science (TSAS)
- College of Health and Human Services (CHHS)
- University of New Hampshire at Manchester (UNHM)
- UNH Graduate School
- Peter T. Paul College of Business and Economics (PCBE), formerly the Whittemore School of Business and Economics (WSBE)
- University of New Hampshire School of Law
- Carsey School of Public Policy
- School of Marine Science and Ocean Engineering

The university is a member of the New England Board of Higher Education's New England Regional Student Program (NERSP) where New England public universities and colleges offer a number of undergraduate curricula with special considerations to students from other New England states. If an out-of-state student's home state school does not offer a certain degree program offered by UNH, that student can receive the in-state tuition rate, plus 75 percent if enrolled in the program.

The Thompson School of Applied Science (TSAS), first established in 1895 and now a division of COLSA, confers an associate degree in applied science in seven different programs: Applied Animal Science, Forest Technology, and Veterinary technology. Four other degree programs were discontinued in spring of 2018.

The coastal proximity of the university affords excellent programs in marine biology and oceanography. Facilities include the Jackson Estuarine Laboratory at Adams Point in Durham, and the Shoals Marine Laboratory jointly operated with Cornell University on Appledore Island in the Isles of Shoals.

The University of New Hampshire Observatory is operated by the Department of Physics for educational purposes.

There are three main university-wide undergraduate research programs: Undergraduate Research Opportunities Program (UROP), Undergraduate Research Fellowship (SURF), and International Research Opportunities Program (IROP).

The university offers many opportunities for students to study abroad through managed programs, exchange programs and approved programs. The university runs/manages 22 study abroad programs in locations which include Cambridge, England; London, England; Edinburgh, Scotland; Brest, France; Dijon, France; Grenoble, France; Budapest, Hungary; Osaka, Japan; Utrecht, Netherlands; Maastricht, Netherlands; Ascoli Piceno, Italy; New Zealand; India; South Africa; Kenya; and Granada, Spain. The university also accepts credit from over 300 approved programs that are run through other institutions. The university organizes an annual summer abroad program at Gonville and Caius College, Cambridge University. There are also over 100 National Exchange Program opportunities.

In 2010, the Franklin Pierce Law Center in Concord was incorporated into the University of New Hampshire System and renamed the University of New Hampshire School of Law. It is the only law school in the state of New Hampshire. The School of Law offers Juris Doctor degrees in addition to graduate studies in Intellectual Property and Commerce & Technology. The University of New Hampshire Law School is renowned for its intellectual property law programs, consistently ranking in the top ten of U.S. News & World Report rankings. In 2012, it was ranked 4th behind the University of California at Berkeley, Stanford University and George Washington University.

The Peter T. Paul College of Business and Economics building was opened for occupancy in January 2013. Formerly the Whittemore School of Business and Economics (WSBE), the Paul School offers degrees in Business Administration (featuring focuses in Accounting, Entrepreneurial Venture Creation, Finance, Information Systems Management, International Business and Economics, Management, and Marketing), Hospitality, and Economics (either in B.A. or B.S).

As of the 2015 fall semester, the university had 12,840 undergraduate students and 2,500 graduate students enrolled in more than 200 majors. The student body comprises 47% in-state students, 49% out-of-state students, and 4% foreign students; and is 54% female and 46% male.

=== Admissions ===
Admission to UNH is rated as "selective" by U.S. News & World Report.

UNH received 18,040 applications for admission to the Fall 2019 incoming freshman class; 15,159 were admitted (an acceptance rate of 84.0%), and 2,731 enrolled. The middle 50% range of enrolled freshmen SAT scores was 1080-1260 for the composite, 540-640 for evidence-based reading and writing, and 530-630 for math, while the ACT composite middle 50% range was 22–28.

=== Rankings ===
Academic rankings

National
- Forbes: 246
- U.S. News & World Report: 109
- Washington Monthly: 150
- WSJ/College Pulse: 501–600

Global
- ARWU: 601–700
- QS: 801–1000
- U.S. News & World Report: 722 (tie)

U.S. News & World Report ranks New Hampshire tied for 109th among 434 "national universities" and tied for 52nd among "top public schools" in 2025. The University of New Hampshire is accredited by the New England Commission of Higher Education.

In 2012, the Department of Education ranked the University of New Hampshire as having the sixth most expensive in-state tuition for a public four-year college. The University of New Hampshire ranks lowest in the country for the amount of subsidy it receives from the state.

Money magazine ranked the University of New Hampshire 117th out of 744 in its "Best Colleges For Your Money 2019" report.

== Research ==
The university is classified among "R1: Doctoral Universities – Very high research activity". According to the National Science Foundation, UNH spent $146 million on research and development in 2018, ranking it 137th in the nation.

=== University library ===
The University Library consists of the main Dimond Library and three science libraries specializing in chemistry, physics, computer science, mathematics, and engineering. One enters The Dimond Library on the third floor. It has three quiet study reading rooms, seating for 1,200, Zeke's Café, and the Dimond Academic Commons (DAC), which offers computer workstations, IT help, the Connors Writing Center, Geospatial Information Services Center, and research help. Other areas of the library provide access to media equipment, collaborative work spaces, and laptop ports.

The Parker Media Lab (PML) is an interdisciplinary audio and visual self-service recording space located in the Dimond Library. The PML was designed to support the creation of professional, academically focused content and is available for use by any University of New Hampshire (UNH) student, staff, or faculty member. The space includes: A One Button Studio for video recording, complete with a camera, audio equipment, and lights; A Lightboard (transparent whiteboard), to support presentations and content delivery; A Mac computer with advanced editing capabilities; A Whisper Room (sound isolation studio) with two professional-quality microphones and headsets. The Parker Media Lab (PML) is located on the second floor of the Dimond Library, room 237. It is available for self-service use during all Dimond Library operating hours.

=== University of New Hampshire Interoperability Laboratory (UNH-IOL) ===
Students and staff, mainly belonging to majors of Electrical Engineering, Computer Engineering, and Computer Science students work at the UNH Interoperability Laboratory, which tests networking and data communication devices and products. The UNH-IOL interviews and accepts applications from students of all majors and varying backgrounds of job experience and expertise.

More than 100 graduate and undergraduate student employees work with full-time UNH-IOL staff, gaining hands-on experience with developing technologies and products. The companies and organizations that work with the UNH-IOL benefit from the opportunity to recruit future engineers from the UNH-IOL workforce.

=== Carsey School of Public Policy ===
The Carsey School of Public Policy at the University of New Hampshire conducts policy research on vulnerable children, youth, and families and on sustainable community development. They give policy makers and practitioners the timely, independent resources they need to effect change in their communities.

=== International collaboration ===
The university is an active member of the University of the Arctic. UArctic is an international cooperative network based in the Circumpolar Arctic region, consisting of more than 200 universities, colleges, and other organizations with an interest in promoting education and research in the Arctic region.

== Student demographics ==
Undergraduate demographics as of Fall 2023
Race and ethnicity	Total
White	86%
Hispanic	4%
Asian	3%
Unknown	3%
Two or more races	2%
Black	1%
International student	1%
Economic diversity
Low-income (Note: The percentage of students who received an income-based federal Pell grant intended for low-income students.)	18%
Affluent (Note: The percentage of students who are a part of the American middle class at the bare minimum.)	82%

=== Geographic origin (domestic) ===
State	Students	Percentage
New Hampshire	5,919	47%
Massachusetts	3,643	27.94%
Connecticut	778	5.96%
Maine	470	3.6%
New York	439	3.37%
New Jersey	276	2.12%
Rhode Island	271	2.08%
Vermont	203	1.56%
Pennsylvania	93	.71%
Maryland	52	.4%

== Student life ==
The university has about 250 student organizations grouped by academics and careers, community service, political and world affairs, arts and entertainment, culture and language, fraternities and sororities, hall councils, honor societies, leisure and recreation, media and publications, religious, special interest, and student activism.

The use and control of the Student Activity Fee is given by the University System of New Hampshire Board of Trustees to the Student Senate, and one of its subcommittees, the Student Activity Fee Committee (SAFC).

=== Student government ===
The Student Senate of the University of New Hampshire is the on-campus, undergraduate student government. The Student Senate controls the use of its own student activity fee, and directly governs student organizations that receive a regular, annual budget from it. The Student Senate also formulates student stances on university policy, and attempts to lobby its position to administrators and the local and state government. According to its Constitution, the Student Senate "[serves] as an advocate for all undergraduate students, deriving its power from the consent of the governed and developed on the principle that all undergraduate students of the University of New Hampshire have the right to participate in its governance. Such participation encourages the development of student expertise in University affairs and places significant responsibility on students for their involvement with the policies, rules, and regulations which affect the quality of education and the experience of students at the University of New Hampshire." The Student Senate at UNH is noted for being one of the few remaining student governments in the United States that are free of a faculty or staff advisor.

The Graduate Student Senate (GSS) represents all graduate students at UNH, with senators elected from all colleges (College of Engineering & Physical Sciences, College of Liberal Arts, College of Life Sciences & Agriculture, College of Health & Human Sciences, Paul College of Business & Economics) as well as from the Graduate School and graduate housing. The executive committee, composed of 6-7 members, includes a President, Vice President, Communications Officer, Financial Affairs Officer, External Affairs Officer, and Community Coordinator, with the most recent Past President serving at the discretion of the current President.

=== Fraternity and sorority life ===
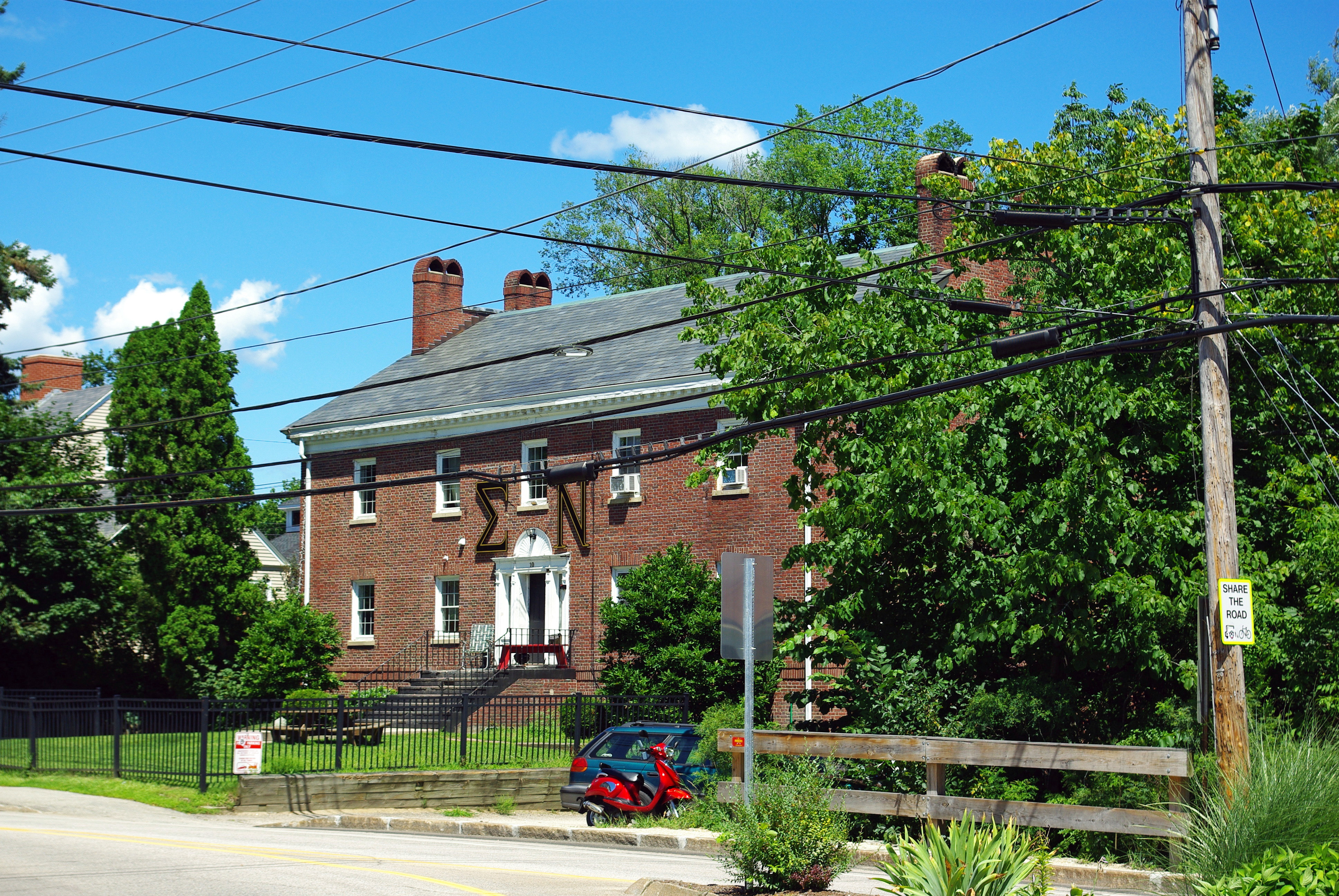
Sigma Nu Fraternity House

Approximately 15% of undergraduate students are affiliated with fraternities and sororities recognized by the university. The Office of Student Involvement and Leadership, the Inter-fraternity Council (IFC) and Panhellenic Council (Panhel) oversee the 13 recognized social fraternities and eight recognized social sororities. Many of the fraternities and sororities have houses on Madbury Road and Strafford Avenue in Durham. These houses are not owned by or on university property. In addition, several unrecognized fraternities continue their operations despite derecognition from the university.

The school's first fraternity was Zeta Epsilon Zeta, which was established in 1894. In March 1917, it became a chapter of Sigma Alpha Epsilon.

=== Current Demographics ===
According to College Factual's 2021 Diversity Report 9,849 undergraduates were white, 419 Hispanic, 339 Asian, 255 multi-ethnic, 125 Black or African-American, and 1 pacific Islander. The race of an additional 542 was unknown and 417 international students were not counted in the survey. Among graduate students, 1,031 were white, 35 Hispanic, 26 Black or African American, 24 Asian, 15 multi-ethnic, and 1 pacific islander. The races of 41 graduate students were unknown and an additional 277 were international and not counted in the survey.

=== Student organizations ===
The student-led Diversity Support Coalition (DSC) aims to offer resources to groups "affected by institutionalized oppression based on race, ethnicity, sexual orientation, sex, gender identity and expression, age, ability, native language, national origin, and/or religion at UNH."

Multiple organizations on campus are focused on providing women in professional fields access to relational and ideational resources promoting success. Women-focused groups on campus include Her Campus, UNH Data Driven Women, Women in Business, the Society of Woman Engineers, and Women in Science.

==== Media ====
- WUNH Durham - Student-run radio
- The New Hampshire - Student-run newspaper
- Main Street Magazine - Student-run magazine

== Athletics ==
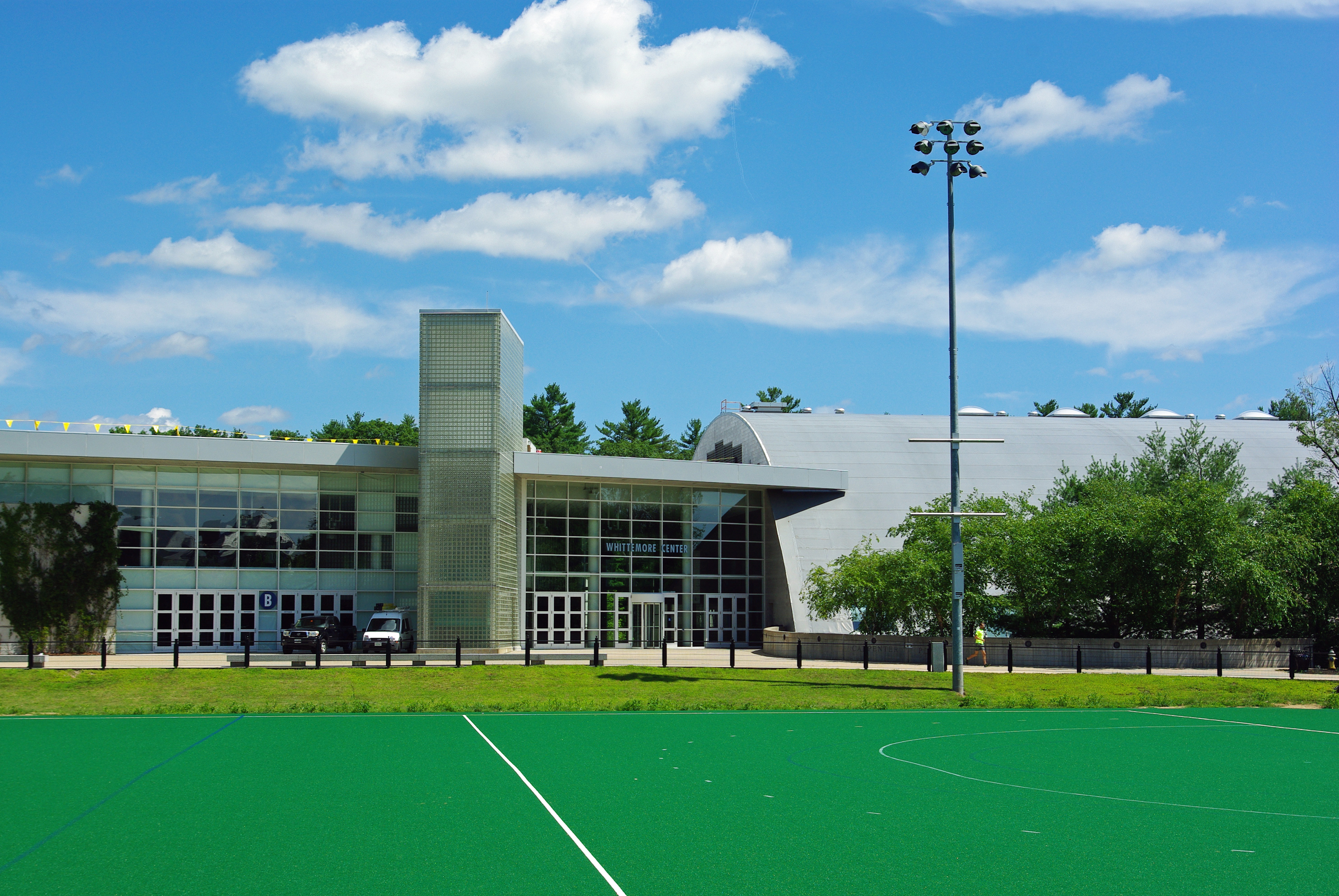
Whittemore Center

The school's athletic teams are the Wildcats, and they compete in the NCAA Division I. New Hampshire is a member of the America East Conference for men's basketball, cross country, track and field, soccer, swimming & diving and tennis; and women's lacrosse, crew, field hockey, and volleyball. The women's gymnastics program competes in the Eastern Atlantic Gymnastics League at the Division I level. They also compete in Hockey East in men's and women's ice hockey, Eastern Collegiate Ski Association for skiing, as well as the Coastal Athletic Association for football at the Football Championship Subdivision (FCS, formerly known as Division I-AA) level.

The university's colors are white and blue, and its mascots are two wildcats known popularly around campus as Wild E. Cat and Gnarlz. The introduction of a wildcat as a mascot came in 1926; it has had a plethora of different names and even forms throughout the campus' history. In 2000 Wild E. Cat was introduced, followed by Gnarlz in 2008.

In addition to varsity athletics, the university offers many club sports through the Department of Campus Recreation, including aikido, archery, baseball, crew, cycling, dance, fencing, figure skating, golf, men's lacrosse, Nordic skiing, rugby, sailing, softball, tennis, taekwondo, men and women's ultimate Frisbee, wrestling, and the Woodsmen Club.

The recognized fight song of UNH is "On to Victory", the most current version of which was arranged by Tom Keck, Director of Athletic Bands from 1998 to 2003. In 2003, "UNH Cheer" (originally titled "Cheer Boys") was resurrected from the university archives by Erika Svanoe, Director of Athletic Bands from 2003 to 2006.

== Durham campus ==
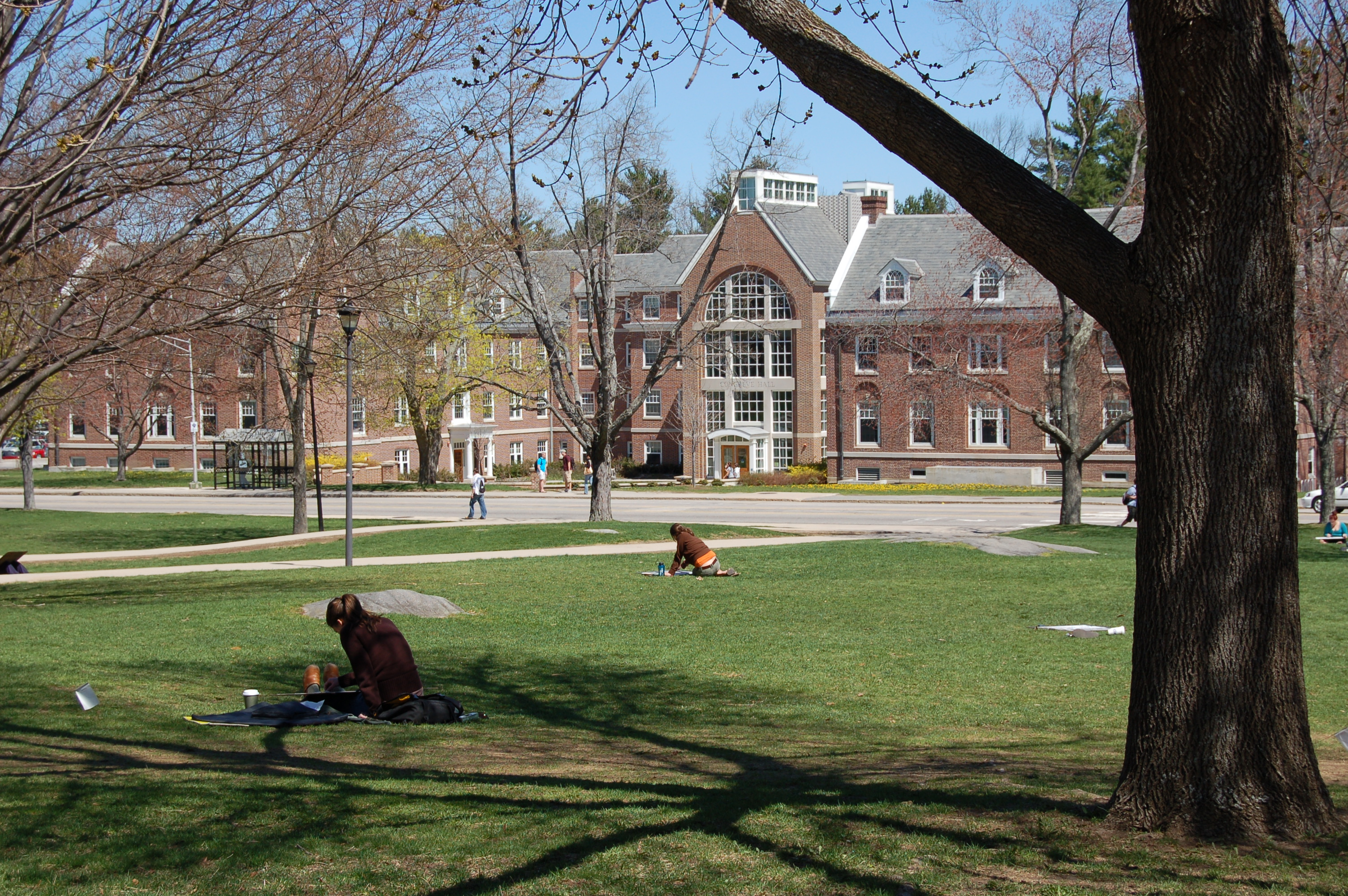
Congreve Hall

The University of New Hampshire is located in the town of Durham, a rural small town on the Amtrak line to Boston. The Durham campus is 1,100 acres (4.5 km^{2}), with 300 acres (1.2 km^{2}) in the "campus core" and 800 acres (3.2 km^{2}) of open land on the west edge of campus. The campus core is considered to be the university property within a 10-minute walk from Thompson Hall, the symbolic and near-geographic center of campus. The campus core contains many of the academic and residential buildings, while the outer campus contains much of the agriculture land and buildings. The university owns a total of 2,600 acres (11 km^{2}) of land. At the height of the COVID-19 pandemic during the 2020–2021 school year, students were required to self-test twice weekly to enter campus buildings and use the university's buses.

=== Housing ===
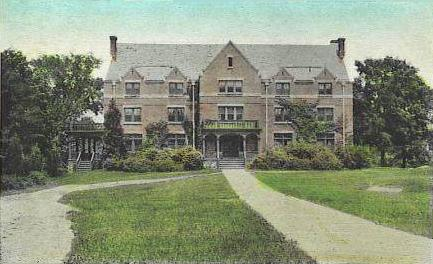
Smith Hall c. 1915

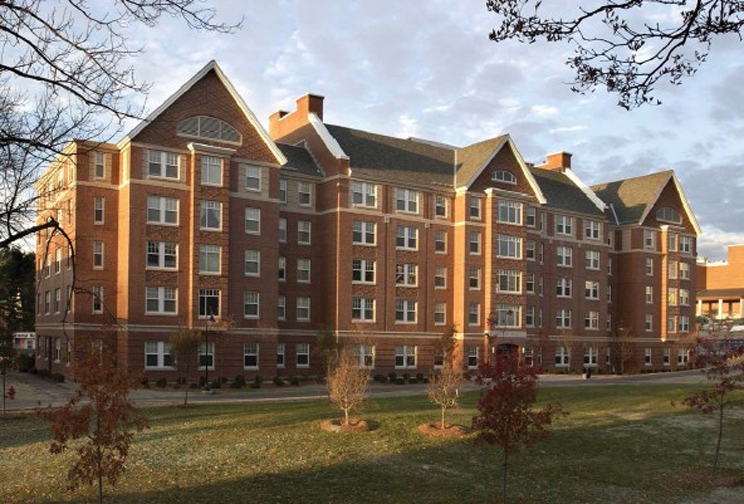
Mills Hall - suites

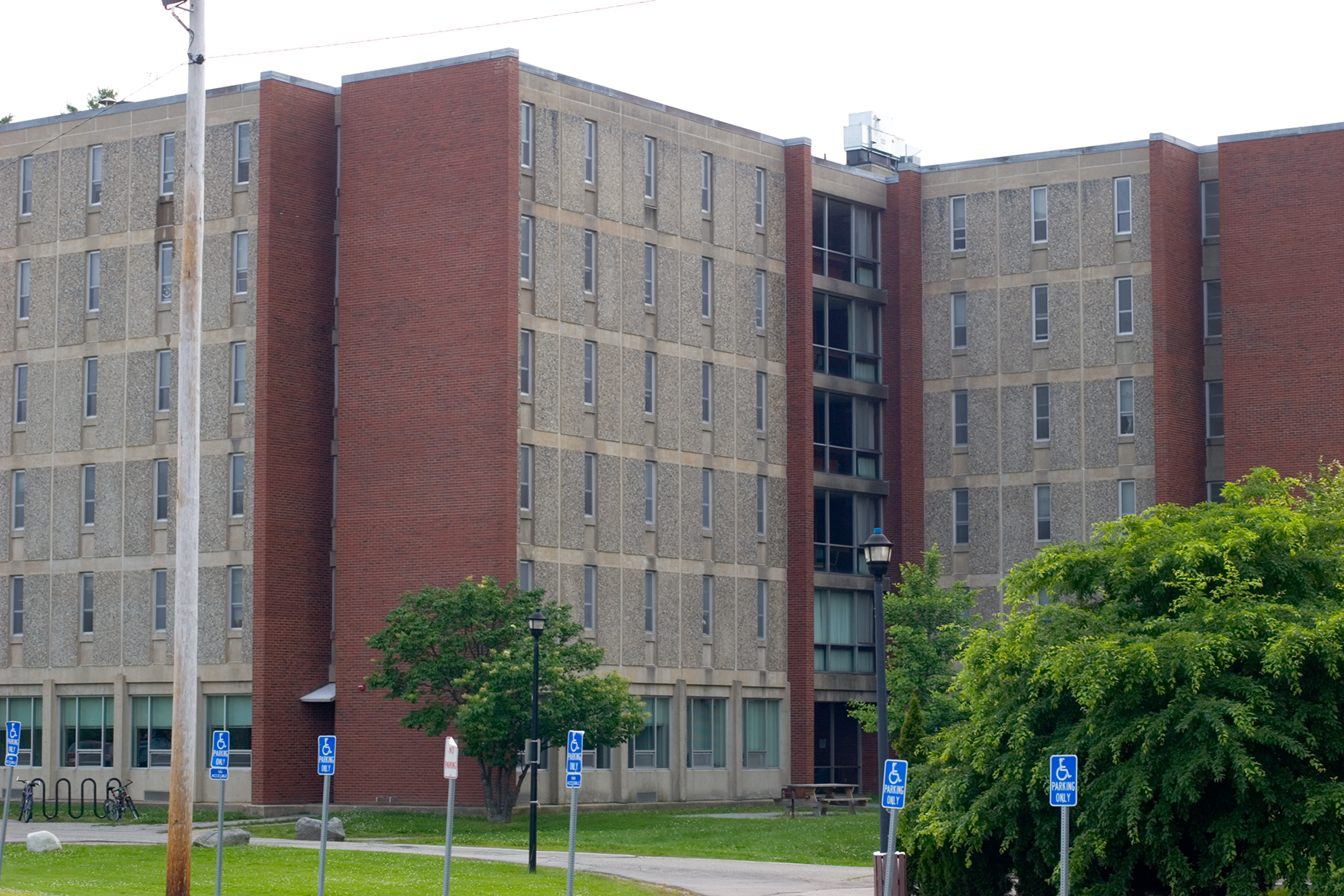
Babcock Hall

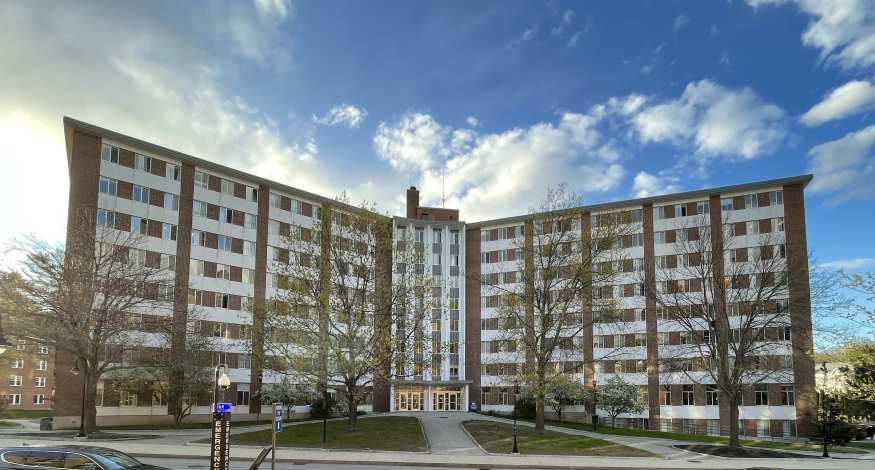
Stoke Hall

As of 2006, the university housed 55% of all undergraduate students. Beginning with the Fall 2023 semester, first year and transfer students under the age of 21 are required to spend at least 4 semesters in on-campus housing. Exemptions must be approved by UNH Housing. Previously in the fall 2020 semester about 96% of incoming freshmen chose to live on campus, and over 70% of returning sophomores did as well.

Several of the university's dormitories have specific themes, including a substance-free dormitory, an international dormitory, and several first year-only dormitories. In addition, many buildings have designated quiet floors for study.

Stoke Hall is the largest residence building on campus. It houses over 700 undergraduate students.

== Manchester campus ==
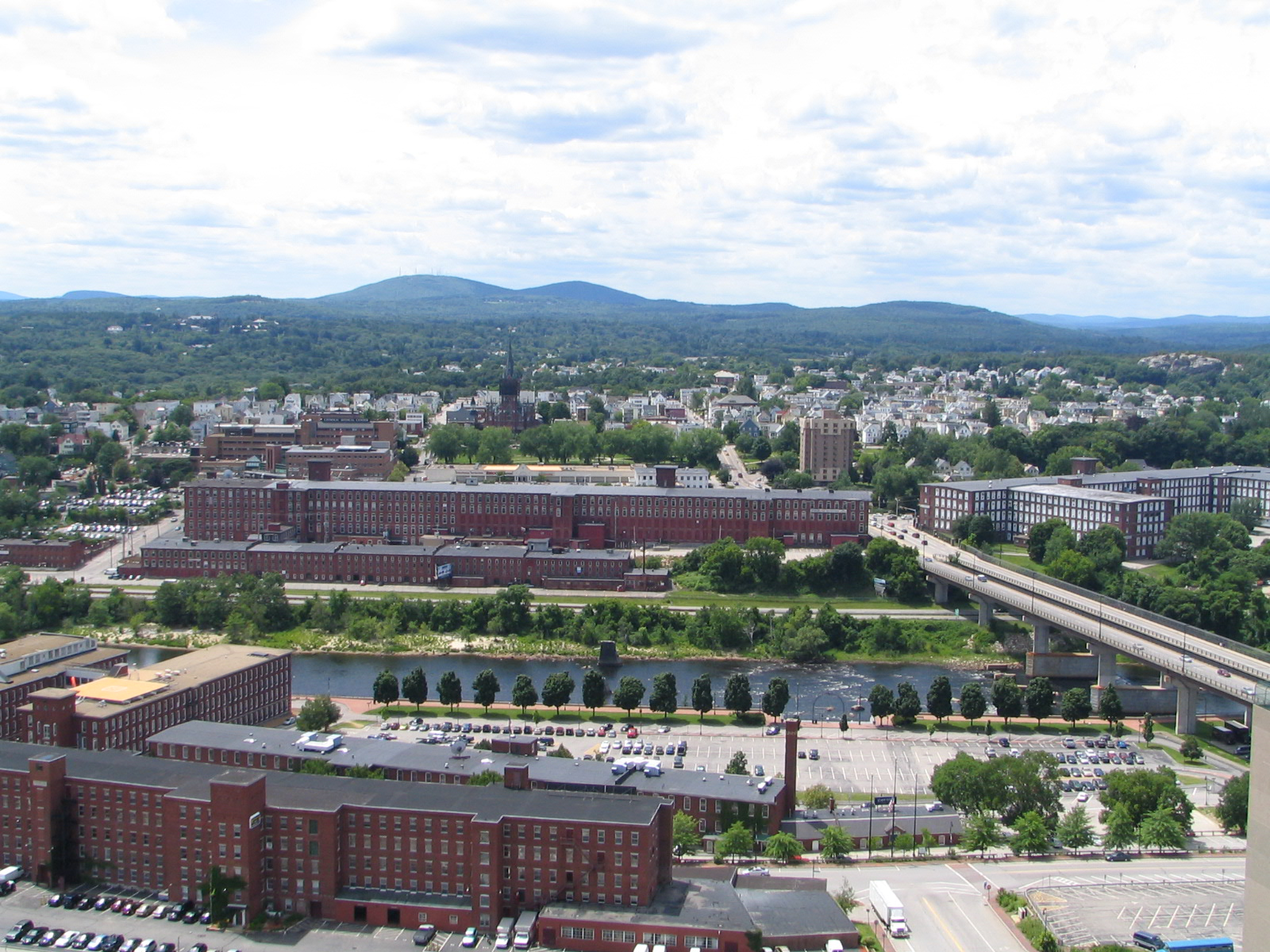
The north end of the Amoskeag Millyard, on the Merrimack River

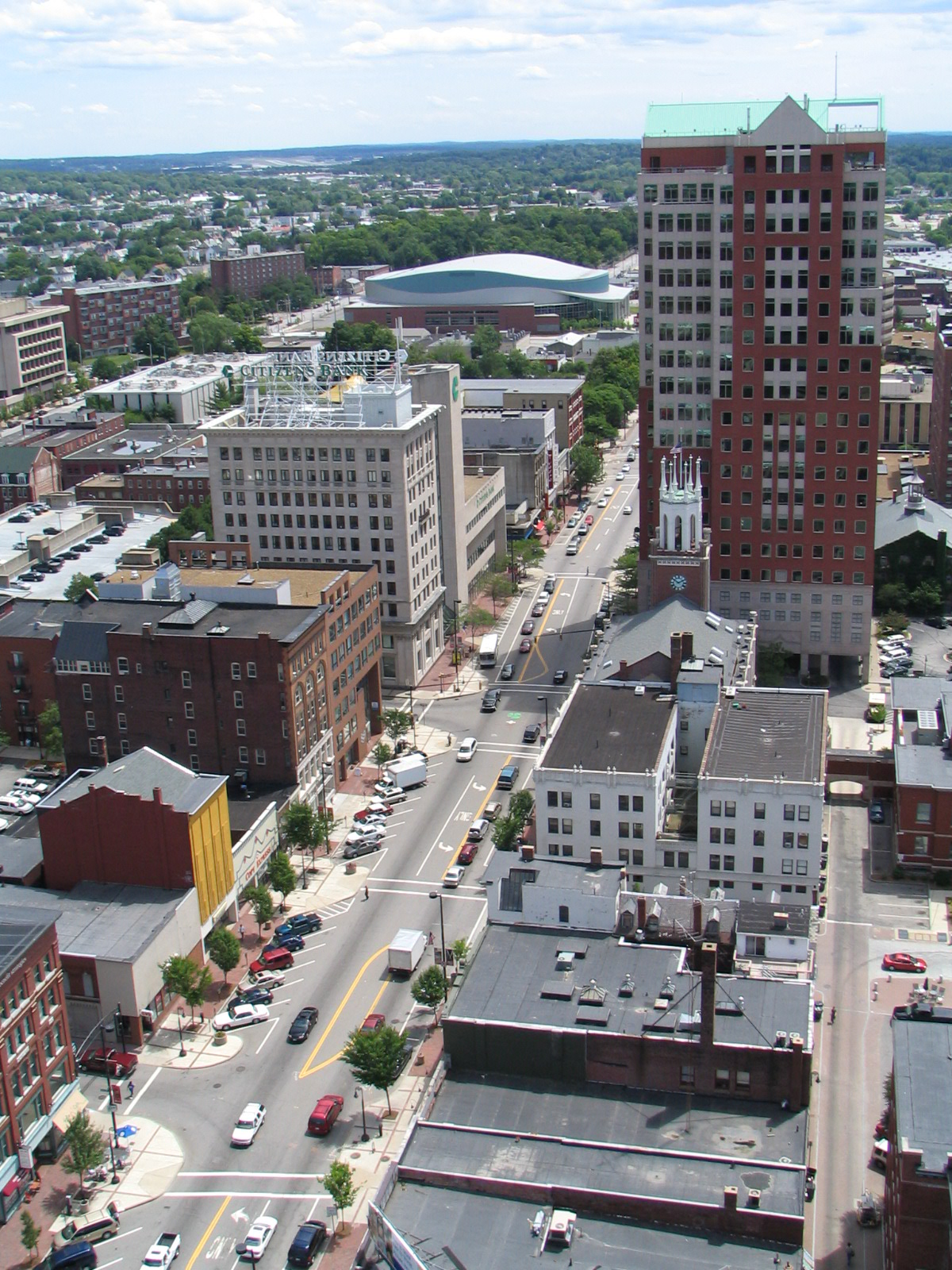
Downtown Manchester, looking south along Elm Street

As of March 2015, the University of New Hampshire at Manchester is located in the 110,000-square-foot (10,000 m^{2}) Pandora Mill at 88 Commercial Street, on the banks of the Merrimack River in Manchester's historic Amoskeag Millyard. The move to 88 Commercial Street increased the physical plant of the college by almost 50%, as from 2001 to 2014 the school was located in the 75,000-square-foot (7,000 m^{2}) University Center building at 400 Commercial Street.

== Concord Campus ==
The University of New Hampshire Franklin Pierce School of Law is a located in Concord, New Hampshire. It was founded in 1973 by Robert H. Rines as the Franklin Pierce Law Center, and operated independently until 2010, when it was formally incorporated to be a part of the University of New Hampshire.

== National Historic Chemical Landmark ==
Conant Hall was dedicated as a National Historical Chemical Landmark—the first in New Hampshire. Conant Hall was the first chemistry building on the Durham campus, and it was the headquarters of the American Chemical Society from 1907 to 1911, when Charles Parsons was the society's secretary. In addition, from 1906 to 1928, the hall housed the laboratories of Charles James, who was an innovative developer of separation and analytical methods for compounds of rare earth elements.

== Notable alumni ==
Notable alumni of the University of New Hampshire include world-renowned author John Irving (B.A. 1965), National Book Award-winning author Alice McDermott (M.A. 1978), filmmaker Jennifer Lee (B.A. 1992), television producer Marcy Carsey (B.A. 1966), actor and comedian Mike O'Malley (B.A. 1988), and several former governors of the state of New Hampshire, including John Lynch, the 80th governor of the state from 2005-2013. Joan Ferrini-Mundy is the current president of the University of Maine.

== Notable faculty ==
- John Aber, professor of natural resources and the environment, notable ecologist, author
- Reagan Baughman, John A. Hogan distinguished professor of economics
- Grant Drumheller, painter, professor of art
- Meredith Hall (b. 1949), author of The New York Times bestseller Without a Map, lecturer of English
- Jochen Heisenberg (b. 1939), professor emeritus of physics, son of famed German physicist and Nobel laureate Werner Heisenberg
- Charles James (chemist) (1880–1928), among the discoverers of the element lutetium
- Rochelle Lieber, linguist, professor of linguistics
- John D. Mayer, professor of psychology, co-developer of Mayer-Salovey-Caruso Emotional Intelligence Test (MSCEIT) and notable author and expert on personality psychology
- Joshua Meyrowitz (b. 1949), author of No Sense of Place, professor emeritus of communication
- Robert Morin (1938–2015), Dimond Library cataloger who donated his $4 million estate to the university
- Donald Murray (1924–2006), Pulitzer Prize-winning journalist, professor emeritus of English
- Chanda Prescod-Weinstein, cosmologist and activist, professor of physics and women's studies
- Lori Robinson (c. 1959), general in the USAF, first female commander of North American Aerospace Defense Command (NORAD)
- Lucy E. Salyer, historian of American immigration law
- Edwin Scheier (1910–2008), sculptor, fine art professor emeritus
- Mary Scheier (1908–2007), sculptor, artist-in-residence emeritus
- Charles Simic (b. 1938), Pulitzer Prize-winning poet, professor of English, U.S. Poet Laureate (2007–08)
- Murray A. Straus (1926–2016), sociologist and professor, creator of the Conflict tactics scale
- Clark Terry (1920–2015), jazz trumpeter, affiliate faculty, Department of Music (1988-2015)
- Laurel Thatcher Ulrich (b. 1938), professor of history at the University of New Hampshire 1980-1995
- Stacy D. VanDeveer (b. 1967), political scientist, professor of political science and chair of the Department of Political Science
- Yitang Zhang (b. 1955), number theorist, professor of mathematics, MacArthur Fellow

== Campus sites of interest ==
- Durham–UNH station, historic train depot, home of UNH Dairy Bar
- Jesse Hepler Lilac Arboretum
- UNH Museum of Art
- Whittemore Center, home to UNH Wildcat men's and women's hockey. Capacity is 6,501 for sporting events, 7,500 for concerts and other events.
- Lundholm Gym, home to UNH Wildcat men's and women's basketball and women's gymnastics
- Wildcat Stadium, home to UNH Wildcat football
- Thompson Hall, first structural home of the University of New Hampshire
- Memorial Union Building (MUB)
- University of New Hampshire Observatory

== See also ==
- UNH Alma Mater
