= On to Victory (song) =

Fight song of the University of New Hampshire

"On to Victory" is the recognized fight song for the University of New Hampshire, typically played by the UNH Wildcat Marching Band and UNH Pep Band. Originally titled "The Line Up", it was written by Florence V. Cole, class of 1912.

The most current version was arranged by Tom Keck, Director of Athletic Bands from 1998 to 2003. It is usually followed by "UNH Cheer." "New Hampshire Hymn" is the official fight song, but "On to Victory" is recognized due to its more traditional composition.

The song was rearranged by William Ericksen and used as the fight song for the Glastonbury High School football team in Connecticut in the 1980s.

== See also ==
- UNH Alma Mater
