= Durham, New Hampshire =

Town in New Hampshire, United States

- Town
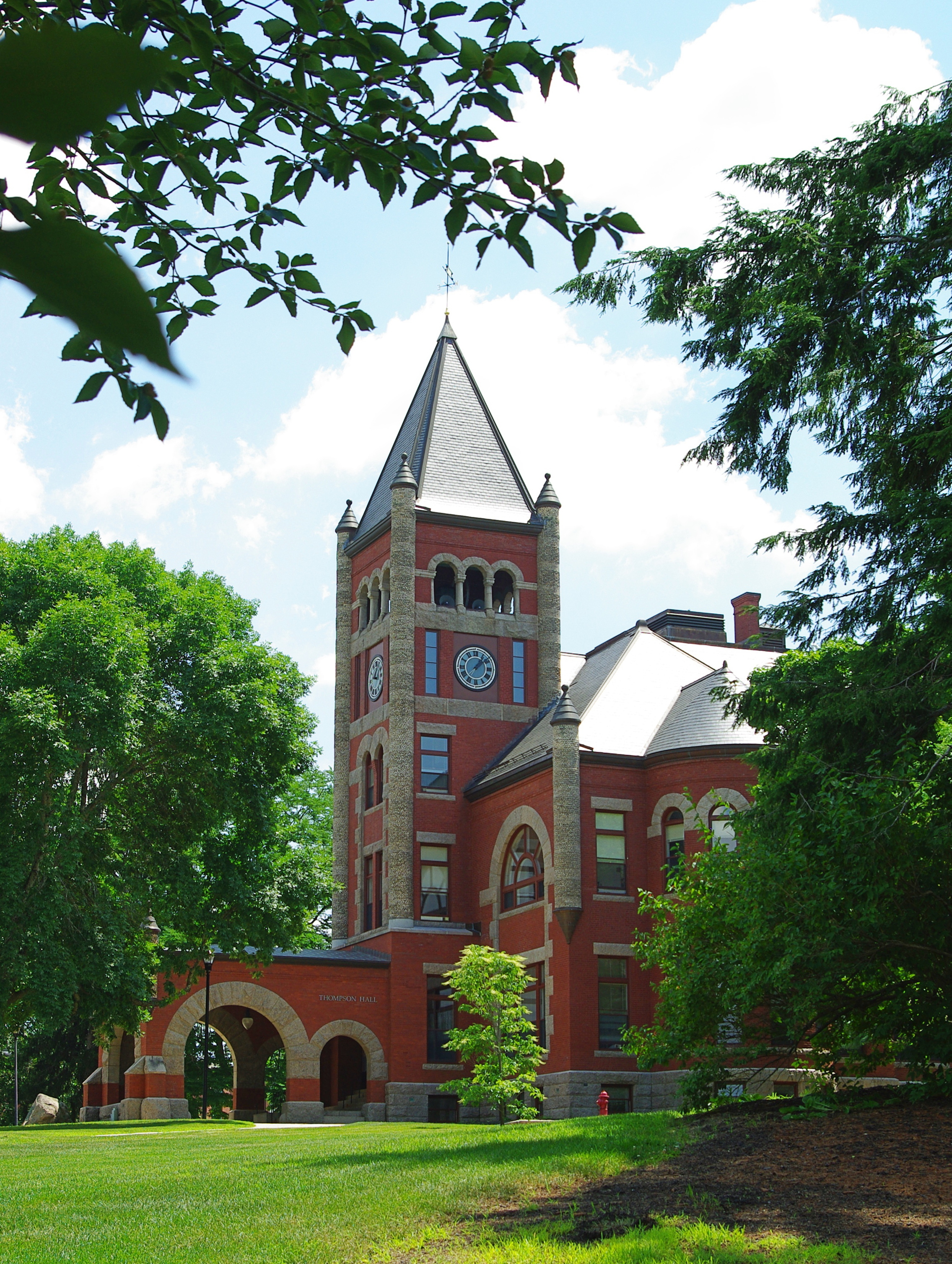
- Thompson Hall on the University of New Hampshire campus

- Seal

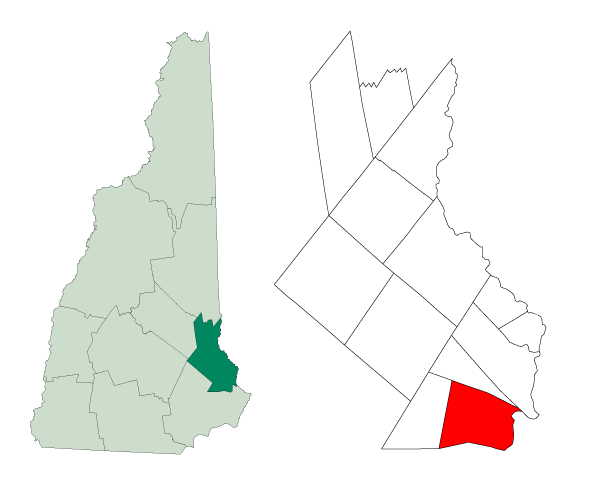
- Location within Strafford County, New Hampshire
- Coordinates: 43°08′02″N 70°55′35″W
- Country: United States
- State: New Hampshire
- County: Strafford
- Settled: 1635
- Incorporated: 1732

Area
  - Total: 24.7 sq mi (64.1 km^{2})
  - Land: 22.4 sq mi (58.0 km^{2})
  - Water: 2.4 sq mi (6.1 km^{2}) 9.50%
- Elevation: 30 ft (9.1 m)

Population (2020)
  - Total: 15,490
  - Density: 691/sq mi (266.8/km^{2})
- Time zone: UTC-5 (EST)
  - Summer (DST): UTC-4 (EDT)
- ZIP code: 03824
- Area code: 603
- FIPS code: 33-19700
- GNIS feature ID: 873584
- Website: www.ci.durham.nh.us

Durham is a town in Strafford County, New Hampshire, United States. The population was 15,490 at the 2020 census, up from 14,638 at the 2010 census. The University of New Hampshire (UNH) is located in Durham.

The primary settlement in the town, where 11,147 people resided at the 2020 census, is defined by the U.S. Census Bureau as the Durham census-designated place (CDP) and includes the densely populated portion of the town centered on the intersection of New Hampshire Route 108 and Main Street, which includes the university that dominates the town.

== History ==
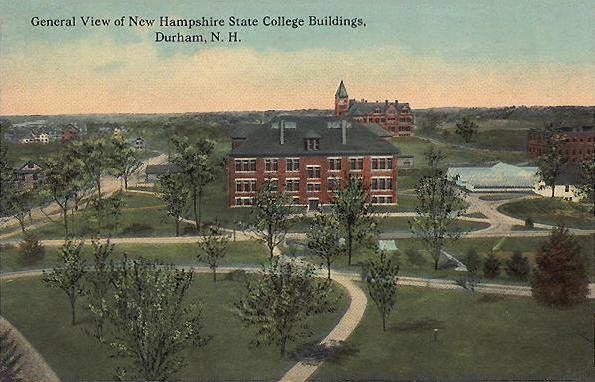
University of New Hampshire, 1913

Durham sits beside Great Bay at the mouth of the Oyster River, an ideal location for people who lived close to the land, like the Western Abenaki and their ancestors who have lived in the region for an estimated 11,000 years. The Shankhassick (now Oyster) River provided shellfish and access to the north woods for hunting and trapping; the sea provided food and access to long-established trade routes between tribes both north and south; and the open meadows provided land on which crops could be easily cultivated. Wecannecohunt (or Wecohamet), as the settlement was known until English settlers arrived, proved immediately attractive to them, too.

English settlers first colonized the region in 1622 when King James I granted Sir Fernandino Gorges and John Mason "all that part or porcon of that country now commonly called New-England ... between the latitude of forty and fortyeight degrees northerly latitude," including every island within 100 miles of the coast and "all the lands, soyle, grounds, havens, ports, rivers, mines, ... minerals, pearls and pretious stones, woods, queries, marshes waters, fishings, hunting, hawking, fowling, commodities and hereditaments whatsoever." Gorges and Mason agreed to split the vast tract along the Piscataqua River (still known by its Abenaki name pesgatak was, for "the water looks dark"). Gorges took the tract to the east and named it Maine. Mason took the land to west and named it New Hampshire. The region was first named "N'dakinna". It is the traditional ancestral homeland of the Abenaki, Pennacook and Wabanaki peoples.

Colonists first arrived in Wecannecohunt in 1622, the year of the Gorges-Mason grant. They spent their earliest years fishing, cutting, and trapping to sell salted fish, lumber, and fur to European markets. By 1633, colonists were spread along the tidal shores of the Oyster River, and by 1640, they were "in 'recognized possession' of lands up to the fall line." Colonial Durham was first known as the Oyster River Plantation. The English settlers brought non-native livestock aboard their ships, "thousands of cattle, swine, sheep, and horses," requiring them to clear acres merely for pasture. Wecannecohunt's fields, carefully cultivated across centuries, were trampled and their crops destroyed. "The animals exacerbated a host of problems related to subsistence practices, land use, property rights and, ultimately, political authority." When violence between the colonized and the colonizers erupted, livestock were frequently killed. The Abenaki saw them as a direct threat to their food supply.

During King William's War, on July 18, 1694, the fledgling English colonial settlement was attacked in the Raid on Oyster River by French career soldier Claude-Sébastien de Villieu with about 250 Abenaki from Norridgewock under command of their sagamore Bomazeen (or Bomoseen). In all, 104 inhabitants were killed and 27 taken captive, with half the dwellings, including the garrisons, pillaged and burned to the ground.

Oyster River was part of Dover throughout its first century. The Plantation was granted rights as an independent parish in 1716 and incorporated as a township in 1732 when it was renamed Durham. Rev. Hugh Adams claimed to have proposed the name "Durham" in an address to the General Assembly in 1738. Two of the earliest settlers of Dover were William and Edward Hilton, the direct descendants of Sir William de Hilton, Lord of Hilton Castle in County Durham, England, but there is nothing to prove that Durham was named in their honor.

Benjamin Thompson, a descendant of an early settler, bequeathed his assets and family estate, Warner Farm, to the state for the establishment of an agricultural college. Founded in 1866 in Hanover, the New Hampshire College of Agriculture and the Mechanic Arts moved to Durham in 1893 and became the University of New Hampshire in 1923. Thompson Hall, built in 1892 with an iconic clock tower, is named in his honor. Designed in the Romanesque Revival style by the Concord architectural firm of Dow & Randlett, it was listed on the National Register of Historic Places in 1996.

On October 22, 1999, Durham was the site of a debate between Republican candidates in the 2000 United States Presidential Election. Future president George W. Bush was present, along with other notable Republicans of the era, such as John McCain, Alan Keyes, Steve Forbes, and Gary Bauer. The debate became the subject of a skit on Saturday Night Live featuring Darrell Hammond in the role of President Bill Clinton.

In 2017, Durham became the first community in New Hampshire to recognize Indigenous Peoples' Day in place of Columbus Day. In 2018, the Oyster River Cooperative School District, which includes Durham, Lee, and Madbury, adopted Indigenous Peoples' Day on its school calendar.

== Geography ==
According to the United States Census Bureau, the town has a total area of 24.7 square miles (64.1 km^{2}), of which 22.4 square miles (58.0 km^{2}) are land and 2.4 square miles (6.1 km^{2}) are water, comprising 9.50% of the town. The town is drained by the Oyster River. The highest point in Durham is Beech Hill, at 291 feet (89 m) above sea level, located on the town's northern border. Durham lies fully within the Piscataqua River (coastal) watershed.

=== Climate ===
According to the Köppen Climate Classification system, Durham has a warm-summer humid continental climate, abbreviated "Dfb" on climate maps.

Climate data for Durham, New Hampshire, 1991–2020 normals, extremes 1893–present
Month	Jan	Feb	Mar	Apr	May	Jun	Jul	Aug	Sep	Oct	Nov	Dec	Year
Record high °F (°C)	68 (20)	73 (23)	89 (32)	95 (35)	99 (37)	102 (39)	103 (39)	102 (39)	99 (37)	91 (33)	80 (27)	74 (23)	103 (39)
Mean maximum °F (°C)	54.1 (12.3)	56.1 (13.4)	65.7 (18.7)	80.0 (26.7)	88.7 (31.5)	92.3 (33.5)	93.9 (34.4)	92.5 (33.6)	88.5 (31.4)	77.9 (25.5)	68.3 (20.2)	57.8 (14.3)	95.8 (35.4)
Mean daily maximum °F (°C)	32.9 (0.5)	36.1 (2.3)	44.6 (7.0)	57.8 (14.3)	68.4 (20.2)	77.1 (25.1)	82.5 (28.1)	81.1 (27.3)	73.3 (22.9)	60.6 (15.9)	48.3 (9.1)	37.7 (3.2)	58.4 (14.7)
Daily mean °F (°C)	23.7 (−4.6)	26.1 (−3.3)	34.3 (1.3)	45.8 (7.7)	56.1 (13.4)	65.2 (18.4)	70.9 (21.6)	69.3 (20.7)	61.9 (16.6)	49.8 (9.9)	39.2 (4.0)	29.3 (−1.5)	47.6 (8.7)
Mean daily minimum °F (°C)	14.4 (−9.8)	16.2 (−8.8)	24.0 (−4.4)	33.9 (1.1)	43.9 (6.6)	53.4 (11.9)	59.2 (15.1)	57.4 (14.1)	50.4 (10.2)	39.1 (3.9)	30.1 (−1.1)	21.0 (−6.1)	36.9 (2.7)
Mean minimum °F (°C)	−7.6 (−22.0)	−5.0 (−20.6)	2.8 (−16.2)	20.8 (−6.2)	29.8 (−1.2)	40.3 (4.6)	48.3 (9.1)	45.6 (7.6)	33.9 (1.1)	24.4 (−4.2)	14.5 (−9.7)	2.3 (−16.5)	−10.6 (−23.7)
Record low °F (°C)	−35 (−37)	−30 (−34)	−18 (−28)	8 (−13)	18 (−8)	30 (−1)	35 (2)	28 (−2)	21 (−6)	11 (−12)	−13 (−25)	−31 (−35)	−35 (−37)
Average precipitation inches (mm)	2.65 (67)	3.04 (77)	3.49 (89)	4.11 (104)	3.63 (92)	3.96 (101)	4.02 (102)	3.77 (96)	4.00 (102)	4.72 (120)	3.92 (100)	4.04 (103)	45.35 (1,153)
Average snowfall inches (cm)	14.5 (37)	13.2 (34)	9.8 (25)	2.5 (6.4)	0.0 (0.0)	0.0 (0.0)	0.0 (0.0)	0.0 (0.0)	0.0 (0.0)	0.2 (0.51)	2.3 (5.8)	11.4 (29)	54.2 (138)
Average precipitation days (≥ 0.01 in)	8.8	8.0	9.0	11.1	11.6	11.5	10.5	9.8	9.5	10.4	10.6	10.5	121.3
Average snowy days (≥ 0.1 in)	3.3	3.9	2.3	0.5	0.0	0.0	0.0	0.0	0.0	0.0	0.6	2.8	13.4
Source 1: NOAA
Source 2: National Weather Service

== Demographics ==
Historical population
Census	Pop.	Note	%±
1790	1,247		—
1800	1,126		−9.7%
1810	1,449		28.7%
1820	1,538		6.1%
1830	1,606		4.4%
1840	1,498		−6.7%
1850	1,497		−0.1%
1860	1,534		2.5%
1870	1,298		−15.4%
1880	962		−25.9%
1890	871		−9.5%
1900	996		14.4%
1910	823		−17.4%
1920	749		−9.0%
1930	1,217		62.5%
1940	1,533		26.0%
1950	4,770		211.2%
1960	5,504		15.4%
1970	8,869		61.1%
1980	10,652		20.1%
1990	11,818		10.9%
2000	12,664		7.2%
2010	14,638		15.6%
2020	15,490		5.8%
U.S. Decennial Census

The demographics of Durham are strongly influenced by the presence of the main campus of the University of New Hampshire. As of the 2010 census, there were 14,638 people, 2,960 households, and 1,544 families residing in the town. There were 3,092 housing units, of which 132 (4.3%) were vacant. 7,266 town residents lived in group quarters, such as dormitories, rather than in households. The racial makeup of the town was 93.8% white, 0.9% African American, 0.1% Native American, 3.2% Asian, 0.01% Native Hawaiian or Pacific Islander, 0.4% some other race, and 1.6% from two or more races. 2.0% of the population were Hispanic or Latino of any race.

Of the 2,960 households, 23.0% had children under the age of 18 living with them, 45.8% were headed by married couples living together, 4.4% had a female householder with no husband present, and 47.8% were non-families. 25.2% of all households were made up of individuals, and 10.2% were someone living alone who was 65 years of age or older. The average household size was 2.49, and the average family size was 2.94.

In the town, 8.6% of the population were under the age of 18; 64.3% were from 18 to 24; 7.7% from 25 to 44; 12.5% from 45 to 64; and 6.9% were 65 years of age or older. The median age was 21.0 years. For every 100 females, there were 85.7 males. For every 100 females aged 18 and over, there were 83.5 males.

For the period 2011–2015, the estimated median annual income for a household was $71,190, and the median income for a family was $120,039. Male full-time workers had a median income of $72,197 compared to $58,750 for females. The per capita income for the town was $22,650. 24.5% of the population and 1.4% of families were below the poverty line. 0.7% of the population under the age of 18 and 5.1% of those 65 or older were living in poverty.

== Arts and culture ==
=== Libraries ===
Over the years, the people of Durham have created several libraries:

Durham Social Library (1815–1857): This library was incorporated by act of the New Hampshire Legislature in 1815. The library contained several hundred books and had a nearly 50-person member body.

Durham Agricultural Library (1862–1881): Formed on February 3, 1862, with Benjamin Thompson as president, this library was small (approximately 72 books) and vocationally-based.

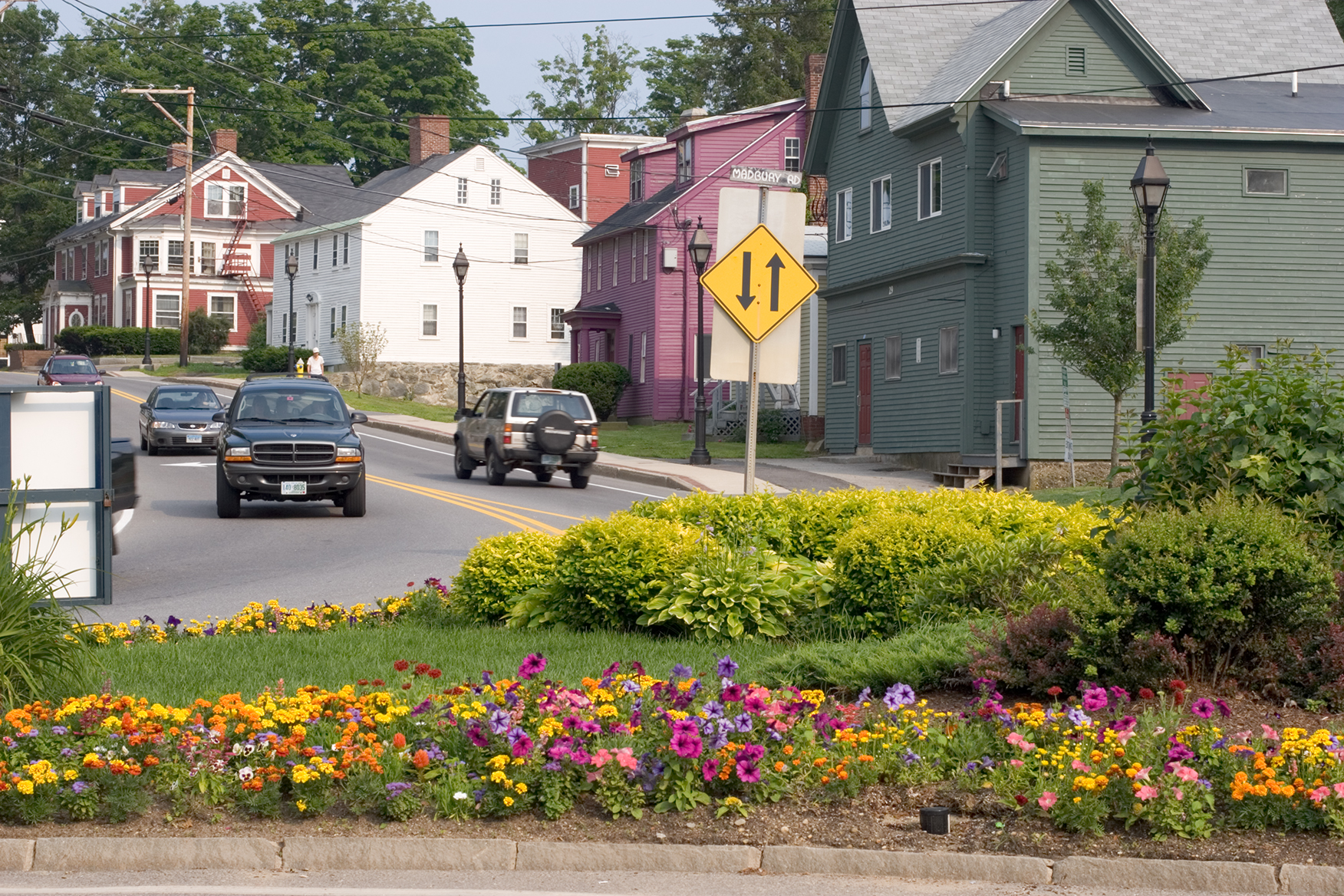
Downtown at Madbury Road and Main Street

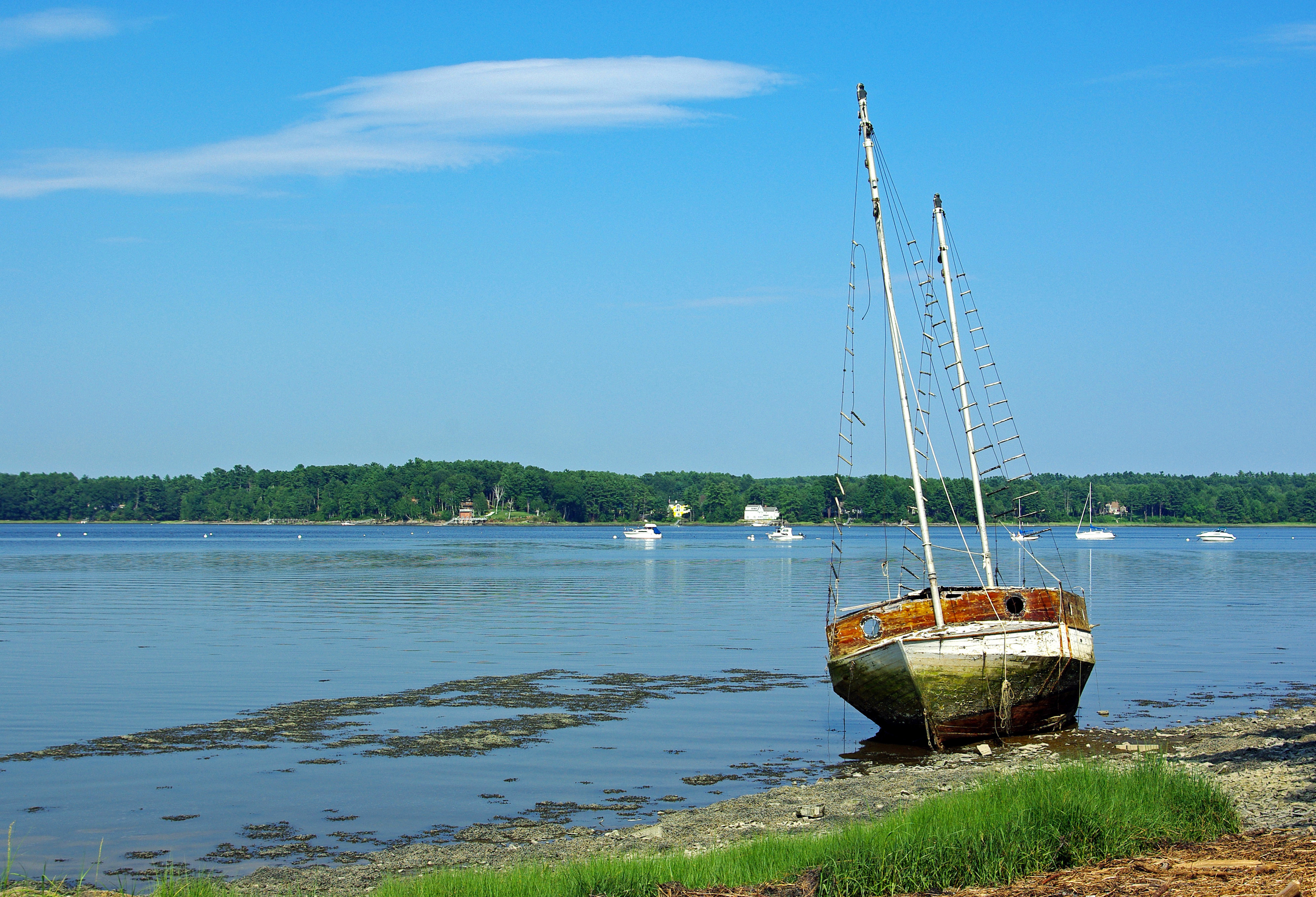
Adams Point in Durham

Durham Social Library (1881–1892): Organized on March 9, 1881, this library had a 80-person member body and several hundred books. In 1883, the Richardson house was purchased to house the library. It eventually merged with the Durham Public Library.

Durham Public Library (1892–1906): Established in 1892 through the provisions of an act of the state of New Hampshire, this was the town's first "public" library. It contained more than 3,500 books and eventually merged with the library of the New Hampshire College of Agriculture and the Mechanic Arts.

Library of the New Hampshire College of Agriculture and the Mechanic Arts (1893–): This library came to Durham with the arrival of the College in 1893. Initially, the College housed the library in a single room in Thompson Hall. In 1900, Hamilton Smith gave the University $10,000 to construct a library; another $20,000 was obtained from Andrew Carnegie. In 1907—a year after the town and the college agreed to merge their collective library resources—the building (Hamilton Smith Hall) was completed.

Dimond Library (1958): This library was constructed to replace Hamilton Smith Hall—which was reconfigured as an academic building with lecture-oriented classrooms—as the university's primary knowledge repository. The building was designed in the Mid-century Modern style.

Durham Public Library (1997): By a margin of 2-1, Durham voters passed a charter amendment to establish a board of trustees and allow plans for a new public library to go forward. In July 1997, a temporary space for the building was selected. Under the guidance of the trustees and a newly-formed "Friends of the Library" group, many Durham residents came forward to sheetrock, paint, assemble shelves, and allocate 719 boxes of books. On July 21, 1997, a dedication ceremony was held for the new library, with Governor Jeanne Shaheen as the keynote speaker. It was the first new public library to be established in New Hampshire in almost a century. It was relocated to a newly-constructed building on Madbury Road in 2013.

=== Sites of interest ===
- Durham Historic Association & Museum
- John Hatch Park: Wiswall Falls
- Oyster River Forest
- Wagon Hill Farm: One of Durham’s largest lots of open land. Originally settled by the Davis Family around 1654, this property is 139 acres and extends from the Oyster River to across Route 4 to the Madbury town line. There is about 6,000 feet of shoreline within the property. The original house sat closer to the Oyster River compared to the white farmhouse seen today, which was built in 1804. In total, this land was owned by the Davis, Bickford, Chesley, and Tirrell Family. Since 1989, the town of Durham has been maintaining and preserving the property, allowing the public to use it. Some activities to do are hiking, running, dog walking, picnicking, photography, snow shoeing, and cross country skiing. At the top of the hill, the wooden wagon sits.

=== Historical markers ===
- New Hampshire Historical Marker No. 8: Site of Piscataqua Bridge
- New Hampshire Historical Marker No. 50: Oyster River... is Layd Waste
- New Hampshire Historical Marker No. 89: Major General John Sullivan, 1740–1795
- New Hampshire Historical Marker No. 154: Packer's Falls

=== Pages From the Past mural at Durham Post Office ===
Inside the Durham Post Office, there is a 16-panel mural called Pages From the Past. This was donated by the Woman’s Club of Durham in 1959, and each panel shows a different part of Durham’s history. These panels include art showing the first settlement in 1623, the area’s natural resources, Native Americans, early transportation, the first school and meeting house, and early religion and education.

The panel “Cruel Adversity” has faced some controversy. This mural shows a Native American crouching behind a bush carrying a torch and bow and arrows. In the background, there is a garrison house that the Native American is looking at. According to the town, the panel is based on the 1694 Oyster River Massacre. The New Hampshire Commission on Native American Affairs has said it inaccurately portrays local Native Americans, and from a European perspective only.

The mural is located inside a federal building. United States Postal Service policy states that artwork has to be preserved and protected for public view, while also noting that the Postal Service "cannot defend the cultural insensitivity that's apparent in certain murals." In 2017, the post office had offered to add interpretive text for the panel.

== Government ==
In the United States House of Representatives, Durham is located in New Hampshire's 1st Congressional District and has been represented by Democrat Chris Pappas since January 3, 2019. He is the first and to date only gay person to represent New Hampshire in the United States Congress. In the New Hampshire Senate, the town is located in District 21 and has been represented by Democrat Rebecca Perkins Kwoka since December 2, 2020. She is the State Senate minority leader and the first openly LGBTQ+ woman to serve in the chamber. In the New Hampshire House of Representatives, Durham comprises the districts Strafford 10 and Strafford 20. The former is represented by Democrats Wayne M. Burton, Timothy O. Horrigan, Loren Selig, and Marjorie K. Smith, while latter is represented by Democrat Allan Howland. It is represented in the New Hampshire Executive Council by Joseph D. Kenney, a five-term Republican who has occupied the role of District 1 Executive Councilor since March 11, 2014.

Durham town vote by party in United States presidential elections (Note: The state of New Hampshire retains a collection of official publications detailing United States presidential election results by town since the year 1888. Such information for prior years is not available from official sources on the internet. For the source detailing the results of the 1900 United States presidential election, the state electors representing each party and their respective tickets can be found on pp. 64-65. Statistics under "Other" are based purely on the published figures and thus lower-bound, for the manner in which the state represents votes for third parties and write-ins from 1888 to 2024 is not standardized.)
Year	Democrat	Republican	Other
2024	6,047	2,270	169
2020	5,970	1,712	128
2016	6,501	2,450	579
2012	5,074	2,217	107
2008	5,363	1,838	56
2004	4,272	1,772	51
2000	3,362	1,585	465
1996	2,694	1,237	237
1992	3,349	1,486	906
1988	2,030	1,647	33
1984	1,794	1,628	12
1980	1,016	1,128	77
1976	1,390	1,484	160
1972	1,294	1,246	39
1968	843	1,076	60
1964	918	686	-
1960	481	1,114	-
1956	315	1,128	0
1952	294	1,067	-
1948	176	820	66
1944	304	591	10
1940	226	554	-
1936	178	469	18
1932	125	457	17
1928	99	453	12
1924	91	313	30
1920	96	249	4
1916	85	115	3
1912	83	78	59
1908	55	132	2
1904	51	144	0
1900	104	141	1
1896	65	161	4
1892	94	137	2
1888	119	134	0

== Education ==
Public education is administered by Oyster River Cooperative School District. Schools located in Durham include Oyster River Middle School, and Oyster River High School.

== Infrastructure ==
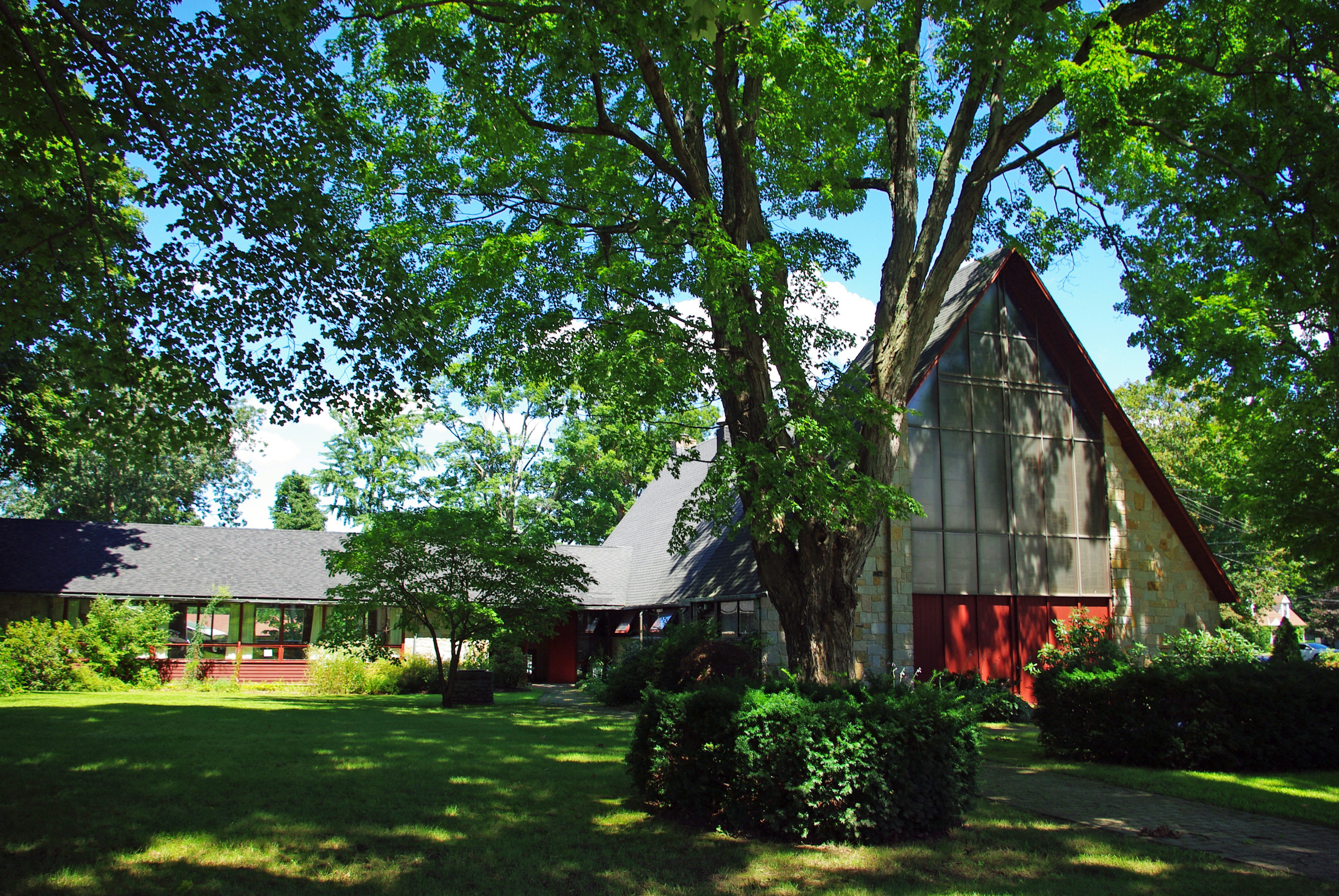
St. George Episcopal Church in Durham

=== Transportation ===
Amtrak's Downeaster train provides five round trips daily through Durham–UNH station, with service north to Portland, Freeport, and Brunswick, Maine, and south to Boston's North Station.

=== Police department ===
A police force of some manner has served Durham since at least 1848. Durham Police Department is made up of 21 full-time and 2 part-time officers and provides service 24 hours a day.

The Police Department's Adopt-A-Cop program was instituted in 1999 to improve relationships between University of New Hampshire fraternities. Each fraternity is assigned a police officer who attends house meetings and events and acts a liaison between the fraternity and the community.

=== Fire department and EMS ===
The first fire department in Durham was organized in 1927, and the first salaried firefighter was employed in 1934.

The Durham Fire Department is one of the few fire departments in the country that is funded by both a municipality and a university.

== Notable people ==
- Eliphalet Daniels (1713–1799), military commander of the New Hampshire Militia
- Dudley Dudley (born 1936), political and environmental activist
- Jack Edwards (born 1957), former play-by-play announcer for the Boston Bruins
- Daniel Ford (born 1931), writer
- Sam Fuld (born 1981), Major League Baseball outfielder (2007 to 2015)
- Louise Janin (1893–1997), painter
- Edward Morgan "Ted" Lewis (1872-1936), Major League Baseball pitcher, educator, and college president
- Manuela Lutze (born 1974), four-time Olympic rower and two-time Olympic gold medalist
- Joyce Maynard (born 1953), writer
- Hercules Mooney (1715–1800), lieutenant colonel in the American Revolution
- Don Murray (1924–2006), journalist
- Lincoln Peirce (born 1963), cartoonist and creator of the Big Nate franchise
- Deron Quint (born 1976), defenseman with six National Hockey League teams
- Alexander Scammell (1747–1781), colonel of the 3rd New Hampshire Regiment
- Daniel C. Stillson (1826–1899), inventor of the Stillson pipe wrench
- John Sullivan (1740–1795), general in the American Revolution
- Ben Sulsky (born 1987), professional poker player
- Benjamin Thompson (1806–1890), farmer, businessman and benefactor of the University of New Hampshire
