= Albert E. Bodwell =

American architect

Albert Edward Bodwell
- Born: 1851; Sanbornton, New Hampshire, United States
- Died: 1926 (aged 74–75)
- Occupation: Architect
- Practice: Dow, Wheeler & Bodwell; Bodwell & Sargent

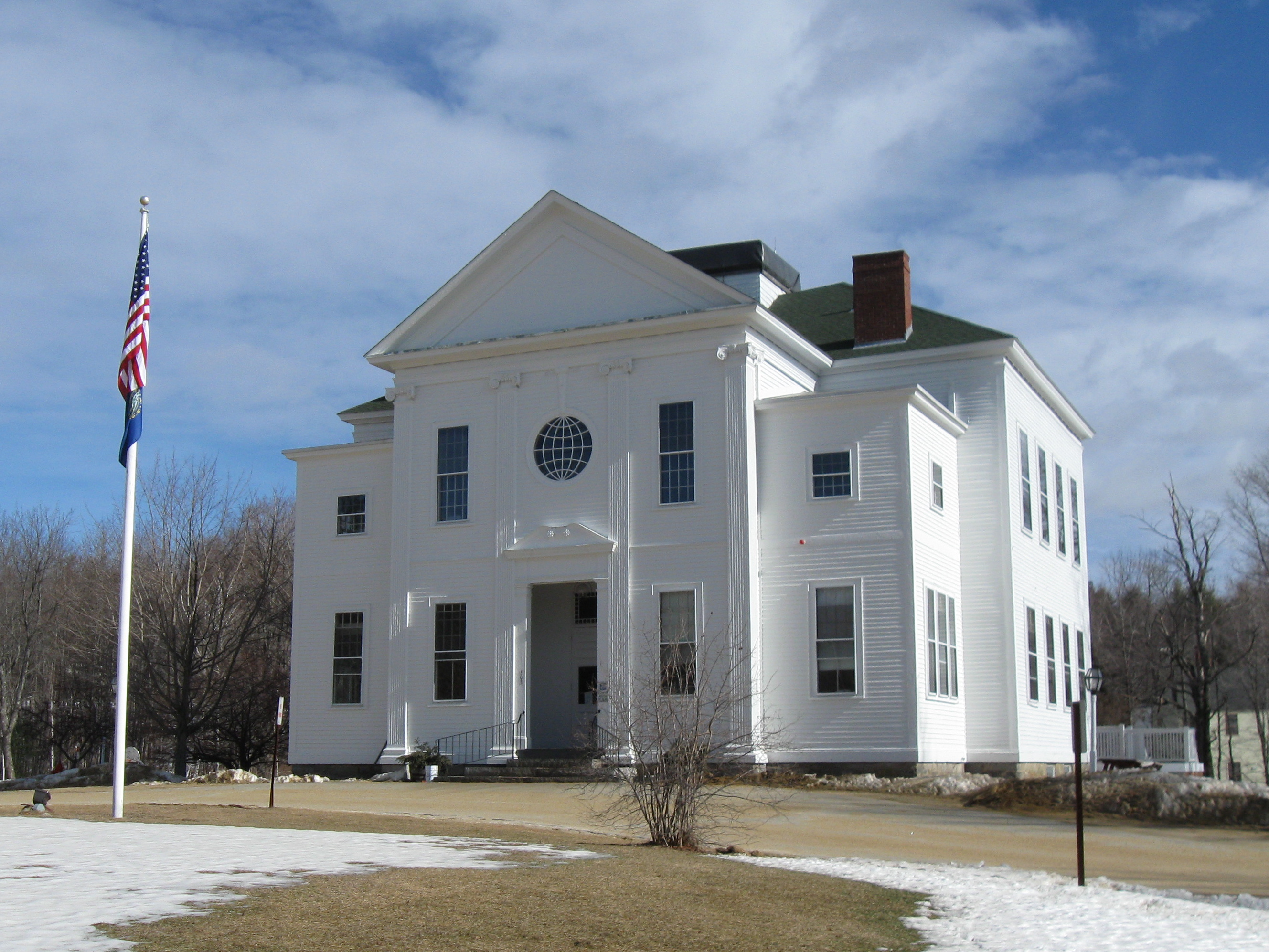
Gilmanton Academy, Gilmanton, 1894.

Albert E. Bodwell (1851–1926) was an American architect and designer from Concord, New Hampshire.

== Life and career ==
He was born in Sanbornton in 1851. His education is unknown, but in 1881 he briefly joined with Manchester architect William M. Butterfield. Soon afterward he relocated to Concord, where he became associated with the firm of Dow & Wheeler. In 1882 he was admitted to the partnership, and the firm became Dow, Wheeler & Bodwell. After only a year or two, Bodwell stepped down from his partnership and became the firm's head designer, and so designed many of Dow's major late works.

In June 1892 he left the firm (now Dow & Randlett) and established his own firm, Bodwell & Sargent, with Charles E. Sargent. The firm was locally prominent, and practiced until 1897, when Bodwell moved to Lawrence, Massachusetts, where he became noted as a historian.

== Legacy ==
As an architect, Bodwell contributed to at least three buildings individually listed on the National Register of Historic Places, in addition to at least two works that contribute to listed historic districts.

== Architectural works ==
=== Dow, Wheeler & Bodwell, 1882-c.1883 ===
- 1882 - Memorial Arch, Tilton Arch Park, Northfield, New Hampshire
- 1883 - Northfield Union Church, Sondogardy Pond Rd, Northfield, New Hampshire

=== For Dow & Wheeler and Dow & Randlett, c.1884-1892 ===
- 1887 - Charles C. Danforth House, 39 Green St, Concord, New Hampshire
  - Demolished.
- 1888 - Odd Fellows Building, 18 Pleasant St, Concord, New Hampshire

=== Bodwell & Sargent, 1892-1897 ===
- 1893 - Hiram O. Marsh House, 48 South St, Concord, New Hampshire
- 1894 - Gilmanton Academy, 503 Province Rd, Gilmanton, New Hampshire
- 1894 - St. James Episcopal Church, 53 Pleasant St, Laconia, New Hampshire
- 1897 - Kenrick Block, 420 Central St, Franklin, New Hampshire
