= Ocean Park Historic Buildings =

Historic district in Maine, United States

- U.S. National Register of Historic Places
- U.S. Historic district
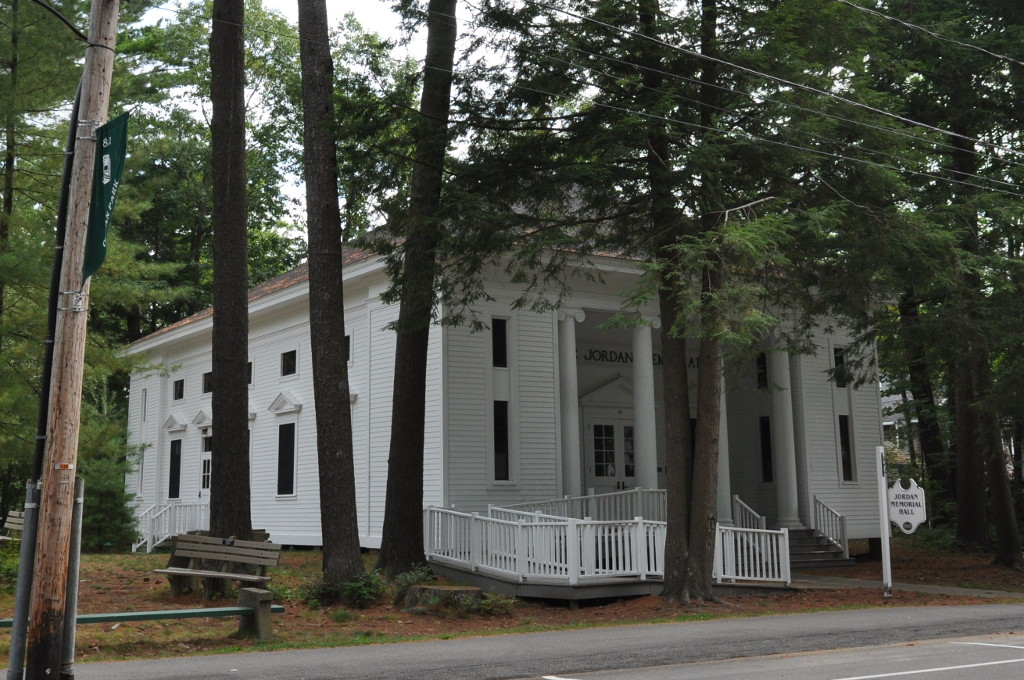
- B.C. Jordan Hall

- Location within Maine Location within the United States
- Location: Temple Ave., Ocean Park, Maine
- Coordinates: 43°30′20″N 70°23′22″W
- Area: 2 acres (0.81 ha)
- Built: 1882
- Architectural style: Classical Revival
- NRHP reference No.: 82000796
- Added to NRHP: March 2, 1982

The Ocean Park Historic Buildings are a group of four religious community structures in the center of the Ocean Park area of Old Orchard Beach, Maine. Also known as Temple Square, they form the heart of the summer camp meeting established in 1881. The buildings include The Temple, one of the only octagonal church buildings in the state. The buildings were listed as a historic district on the National Register of Historic Places in 1982.

== Description and history ==
The idea for the Ocean Park camp meeting arose during an 1880 meeting of Free Will Baptists at Weirs Beach, New Hampshire, a resort area on Lake Winnipesaukee in central New Hampshire. An association was formed, land was purchased in Saco, Maine (later separated as part of Old Orchard Beach), and the first building of the institution, The Temple, soon followed. Between then and 1915 three additional buildings were added on either side of that one, on land in the development reserved by the association for its buildings. The four buildings are described here from west to east.

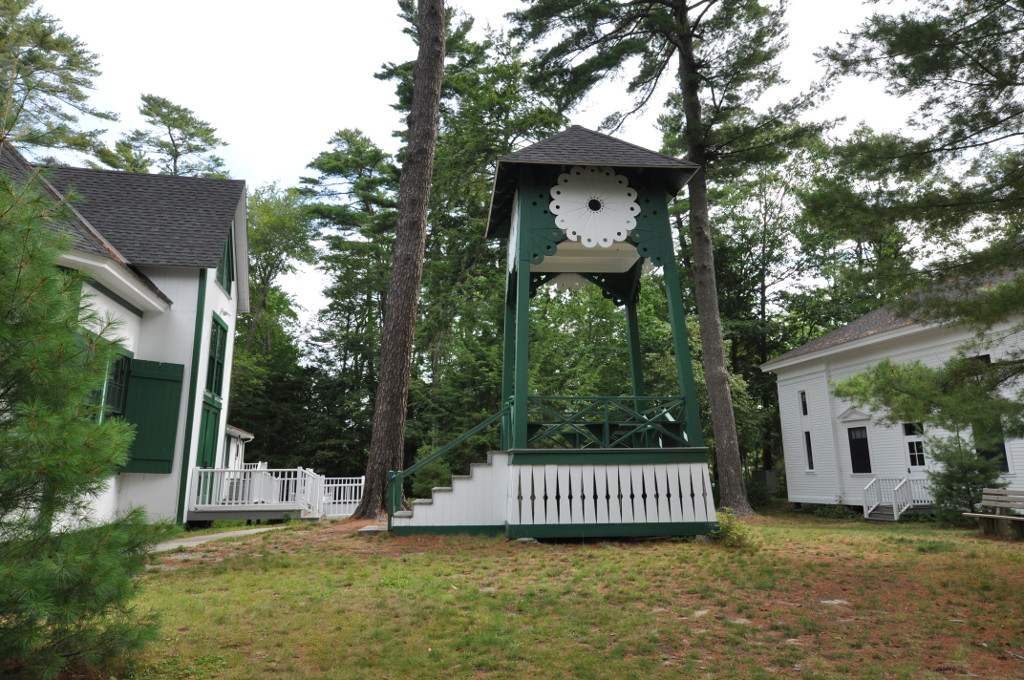
The "Bell Tower"

Porter Hall, built in 1902, is a fine example of Greek Revival architecture. It has a colonnaded temple front, matchboard siding, and gable roof. Four Corinthian columns support a frieze with words "Hall in the Grove", above which the fully pedimented gable end has the words "Porter Hall" above a lamp motif. The facade is three bays wide, with a center double-door flanked by sash windows. This building houses the association's library and research facilities.

The Temple is a large octagonal structure, two stories in height, with a hip roof topped at the center by a cupola. At the front of the building a two-story gabled vestibule projects, with the main entrance on the first floor and a double window on the second. The east and west facades are three bays wide, with a center projecting section. The north facade has a storage area projecting from it; the other sides have two windows each. The interior of the hall is a large open space, with a platform at the north wall. Original chairs and pews are still in use. Just east of the Temple stands a square structure known as the Bell Tower, built in 1882. This is a gazebo-like structure, with a deck accessed by a flight of steps, and a roof with decorated sides that resemble clock faces.

The B. C. Jordan Memorial Hall, built in 1915, forms the eastern end of the group. It is a two-story wood-frame structure, with clapboard siding. Its entrance is recessed behind a colonnade of four smooth Doric columns. The building entrances (the main one on the west side and a secondary one on the north side) are capped by gabled pediments, a detail repeated on first floor windows.

== See also ==
- National Register of Historic Places listings in York County, Maine
