= Charles H. Hayes Building =

- U.S. National Register of Historic Places
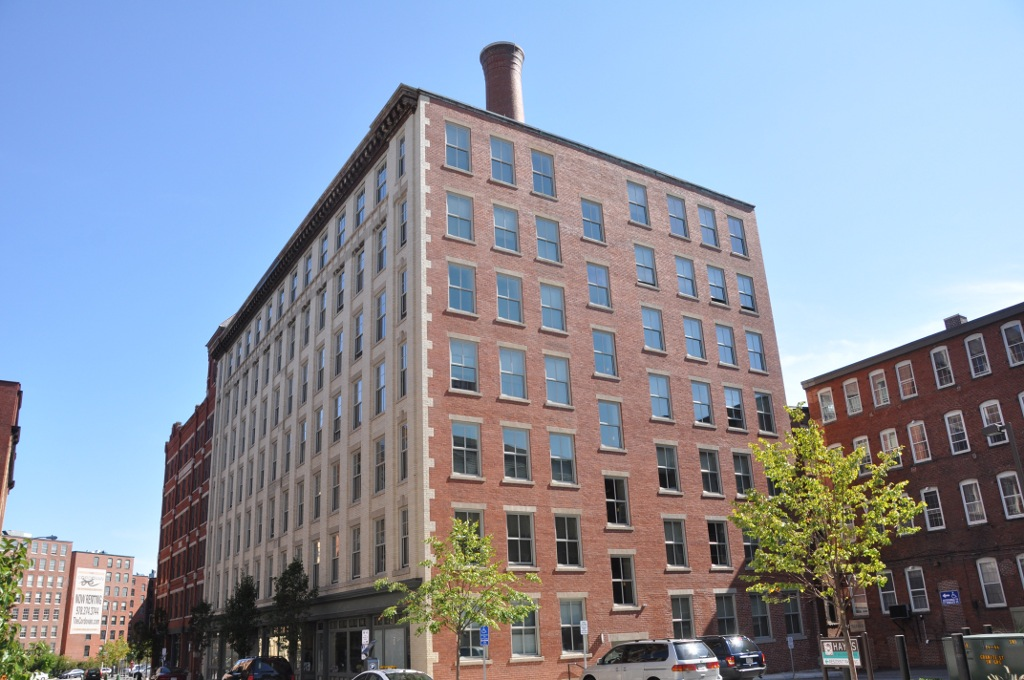

- Location within Massachusetts Location within the United States
- Location: Haverhill, Massachusetts
- Coordinates: 42°46′27″N 71°5′7″W
- Built: 1894, 1911
- Architect: Josiah M. Littlefield; George W. Griffin
- Architectural style: Queen Anne
- NRHP reference No.: 10001006
- Added to NRHP: December 13, 2010

The Charles H. Hayes Building is a historic former box factory at 14-44 Granite Street, Haverhill, Massachusetts. Built in two phases (1894 and 1911), the building represents the city's industrial growth around the turn of the 20th century. It was built by Charles H. Hayes, whose business empire also included locally important shoe manufacturers, as well as forest lands in four states to supply his operations. The building was listed on the National Register of Historic Places in 2010.

== Description and history ==
The Hayes Building is located on the south side of Granite Street, between Railroad Square and Essex Street, and just north of the shoe manufacturing district of Washington Street in downtown Haverhill. The eastern section of the building, built in 1894, is a six-story structure with Queen Anne styling, built out of red brick with terra cotta, brick, and granite trim and decorative elements. It is ten bays wide and eight deep. Abutting to the west is a seven-story structure built out of buff brick with concrete detailing. The two buildings have been joined since an early date, with a single entrance and connections between their floors.

The building was built for Charles H. Hayes, a leading shoe manufacturer in Haverhill. The box factory established on the premises provided packing supplies for Haverhill's shoe factories. Hayes and a partner had purchased an earlier box maker located on Granite Street in 1884, which business Hayes became sole proprietor of in 1892. In addition to his operations in Haverhill, Hayes owned a factory in Farmington, New Hampshire, as well as numerous sawmills. His business operations were reported to extend as far south as Delaware and New Jersey.

The first portion of the present building was construction in 1894 to a design by Josiah M. Littlefield, a leading Haverhill architect. The business was expanded in 1911, with a major addition designed by George W. Griffin. The Hayes Company operated on the premises until c. 1941, leasing out portions of the building as its business declined. The building was then occupied by Western Electric until 1954. Thereafter it housed only a few small tenants, and was largely vacant. The property has since been rehabilitated and converted to residential use.

== See also ==
- National Register of Historic Places listings in Essex County, Massachusetts
