= Edward Dow (architect) =

American architect

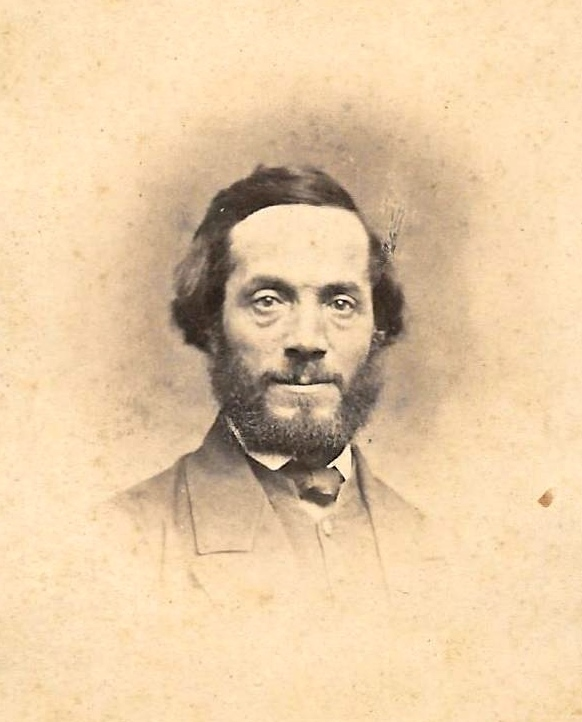
- Born: July 11, 1820; Lemington, Vermont, U.S.
- Died: July 31, 1894 (aged 74); Concord, New Hampshire, U.S.
- Occupation: Architect
- Relatives: Wallace L. Dow (nephew)
- Practice: Colby & Dow; Edward Dow; Dow & Wheeler; Dow & Randlett

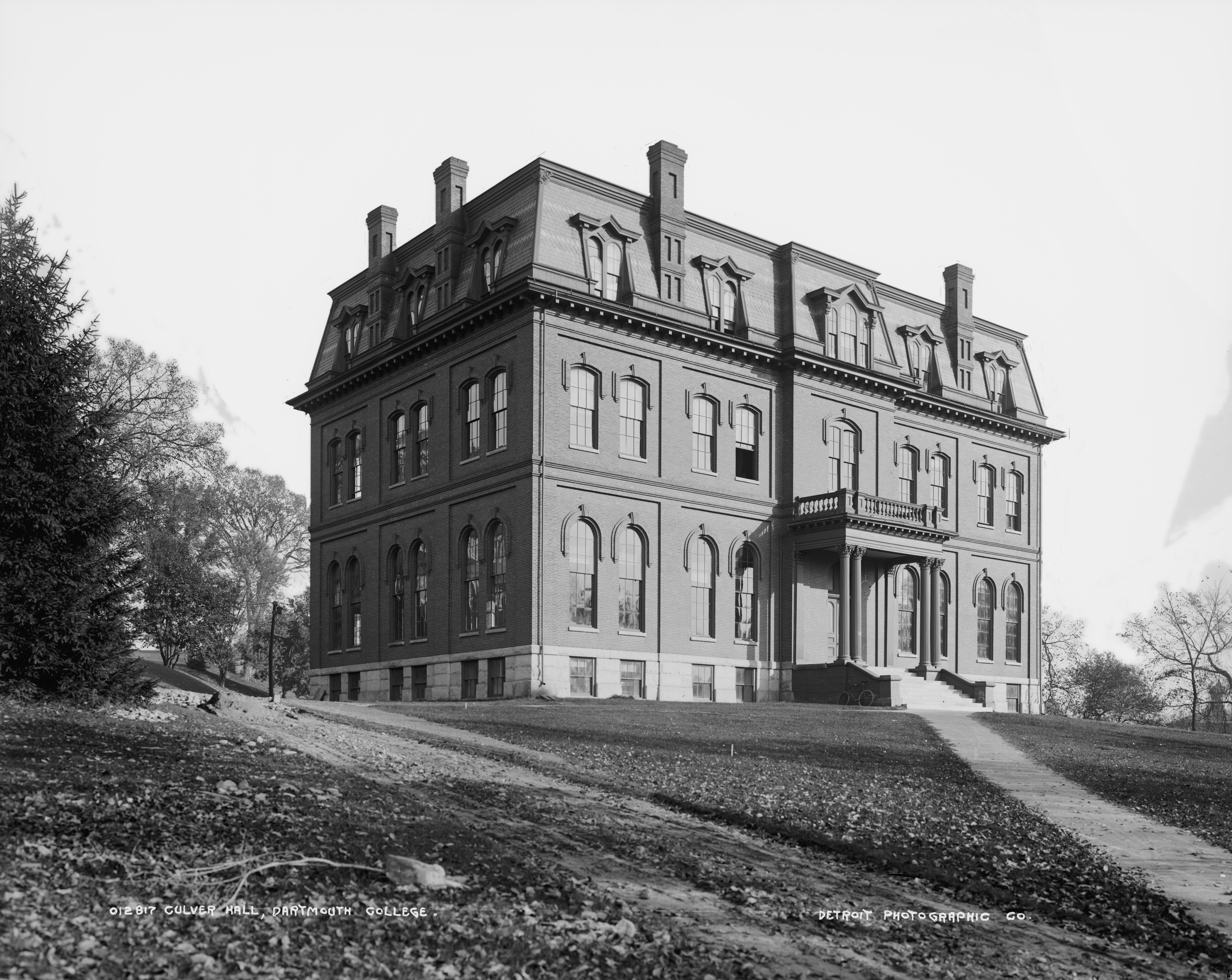
Culver Hall, New Hampshire College, 1869.

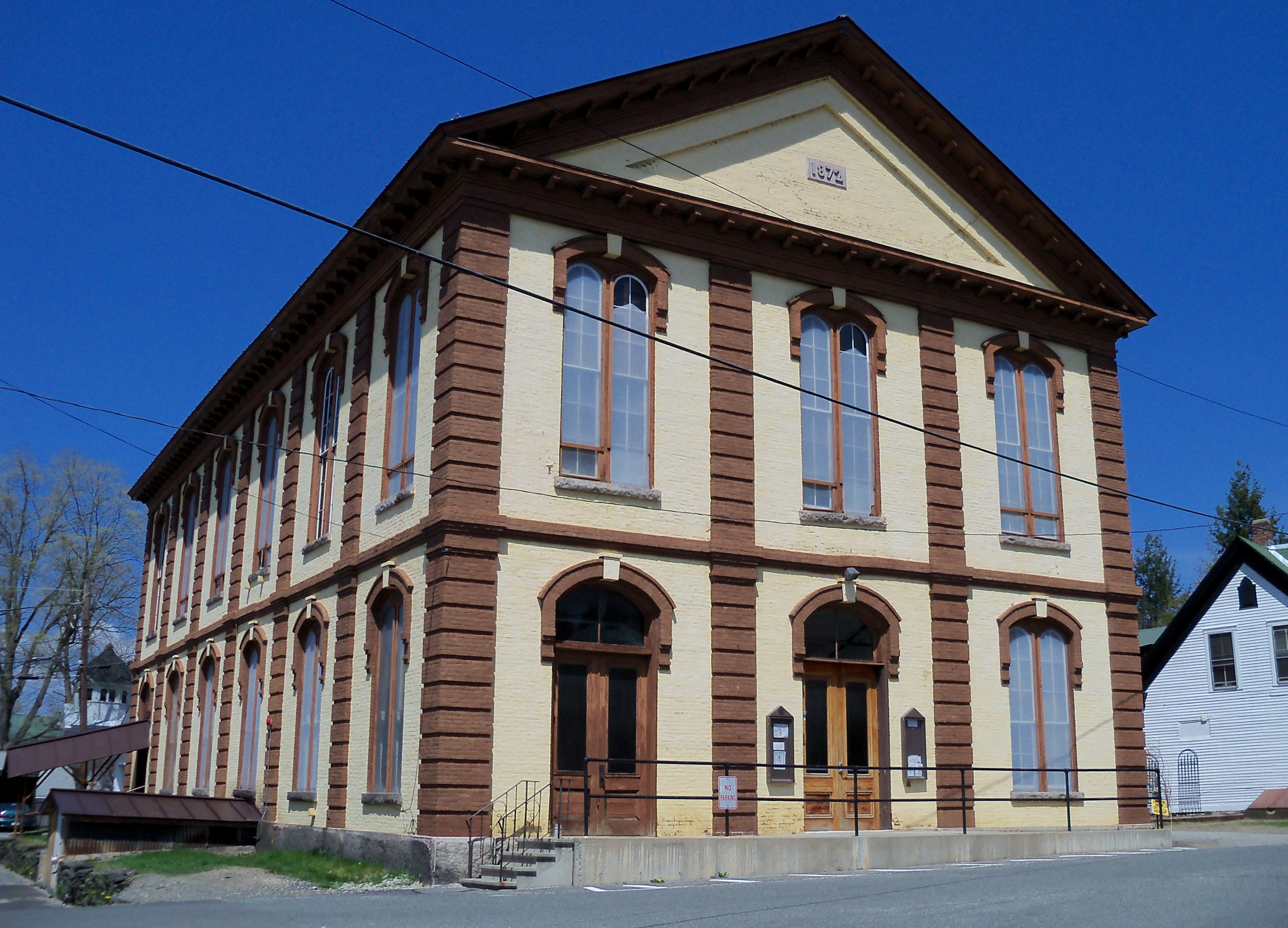
Town Hall, Charlestown, 1872.

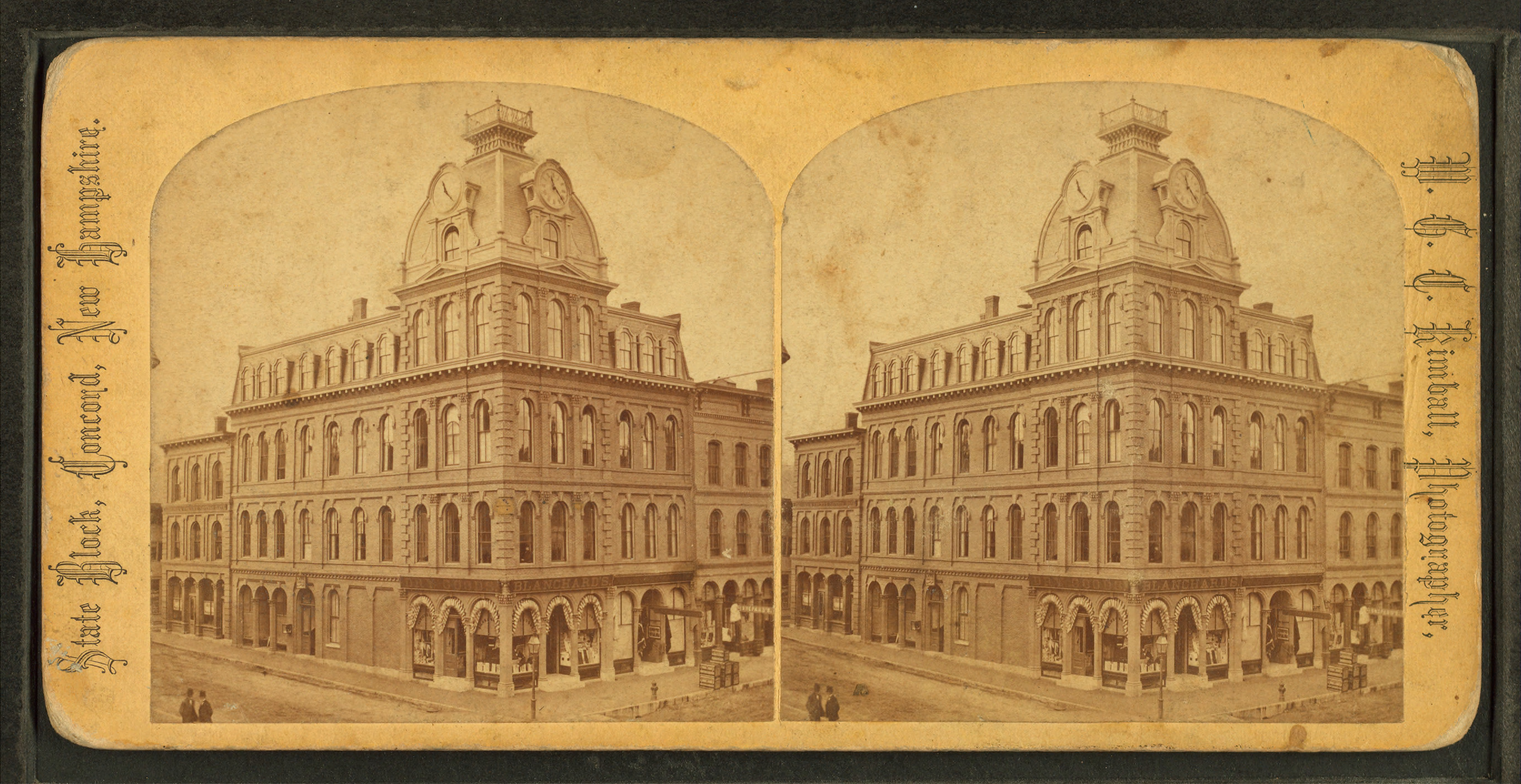
Board of Trade Building, Concord, 1873.

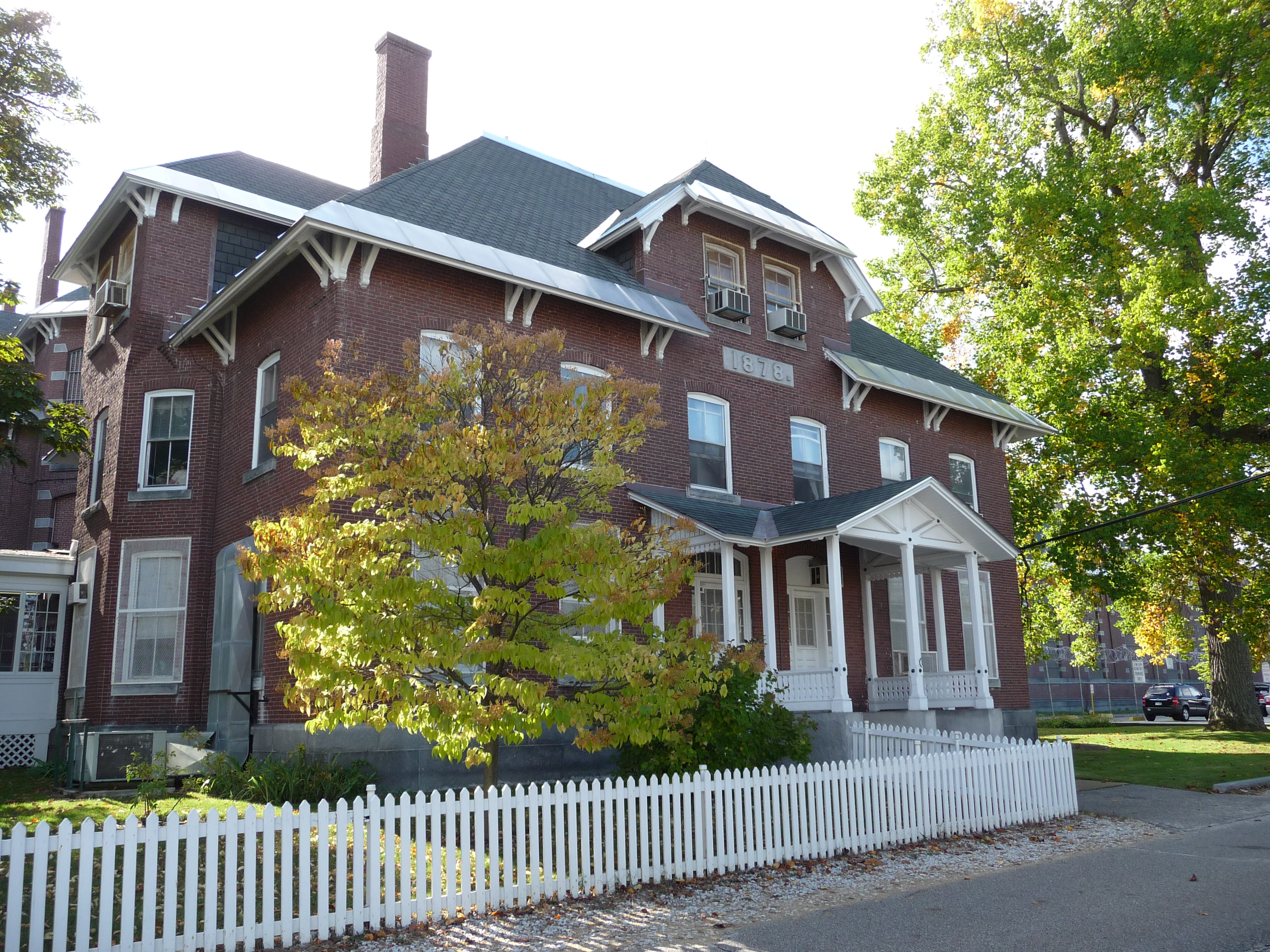
New Hampshire State Prison, Concord, 1878.

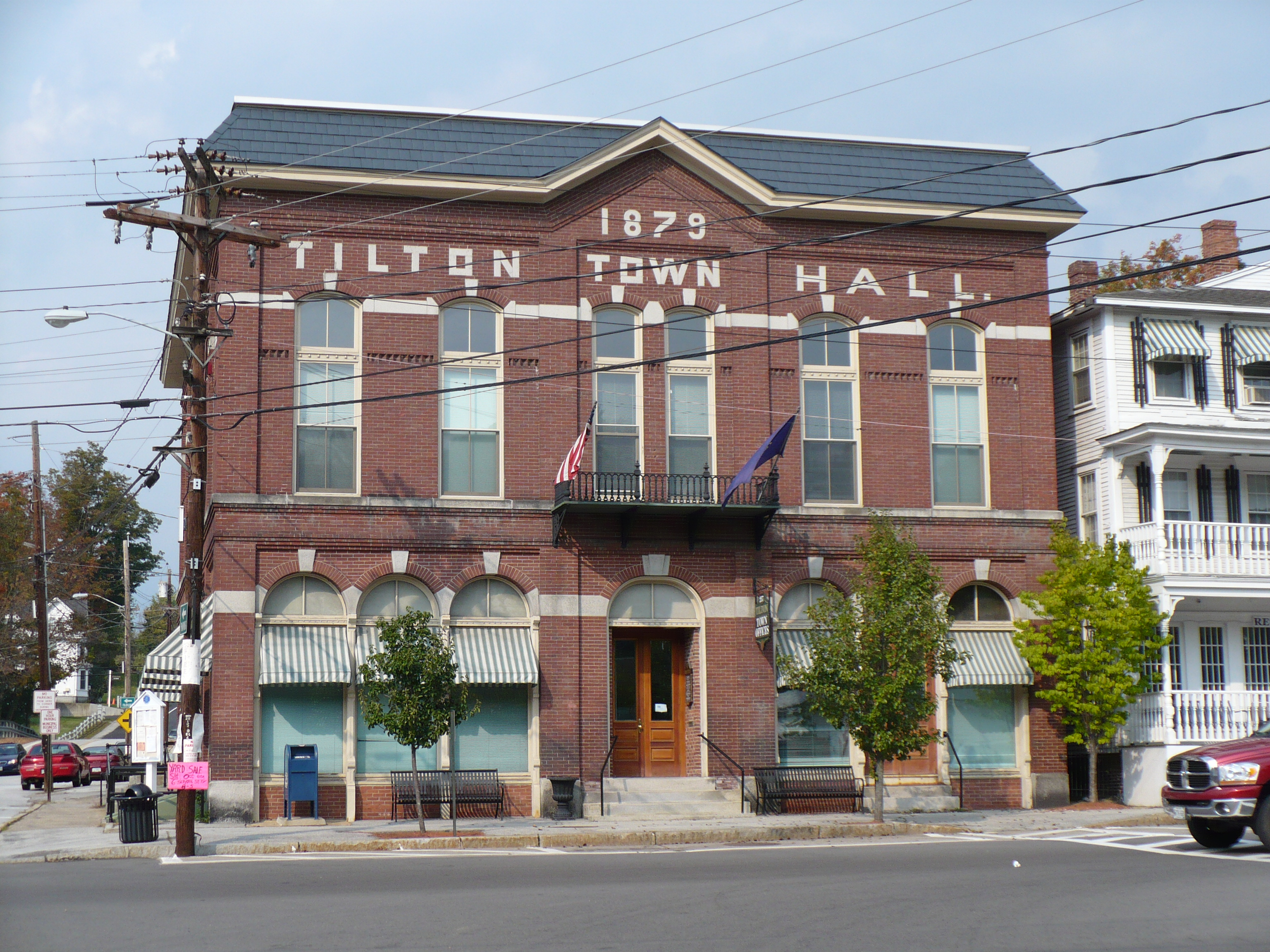
Town Hall, Tilton, 1879.

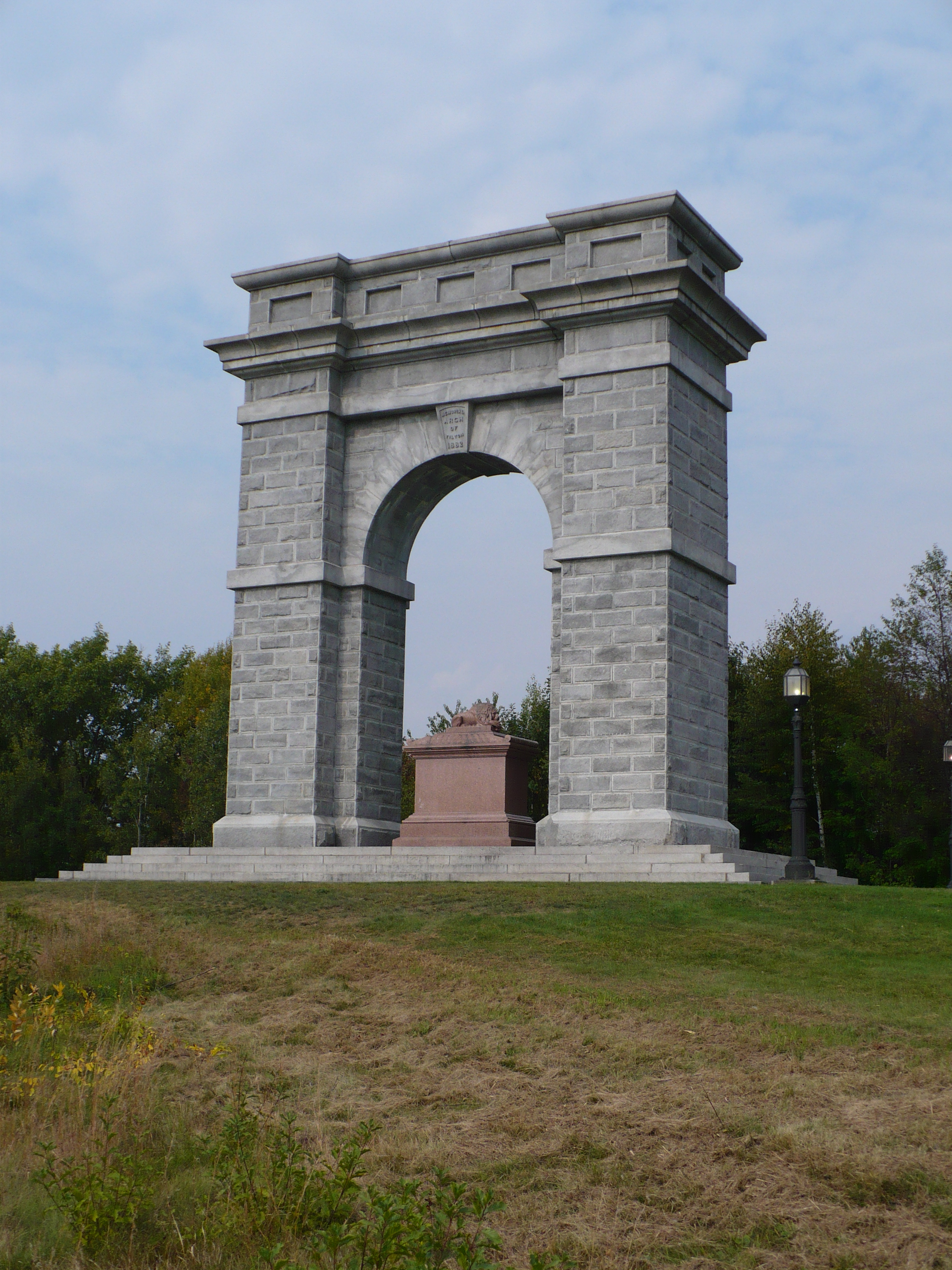
Memorial Arch, Northfield, 1882.

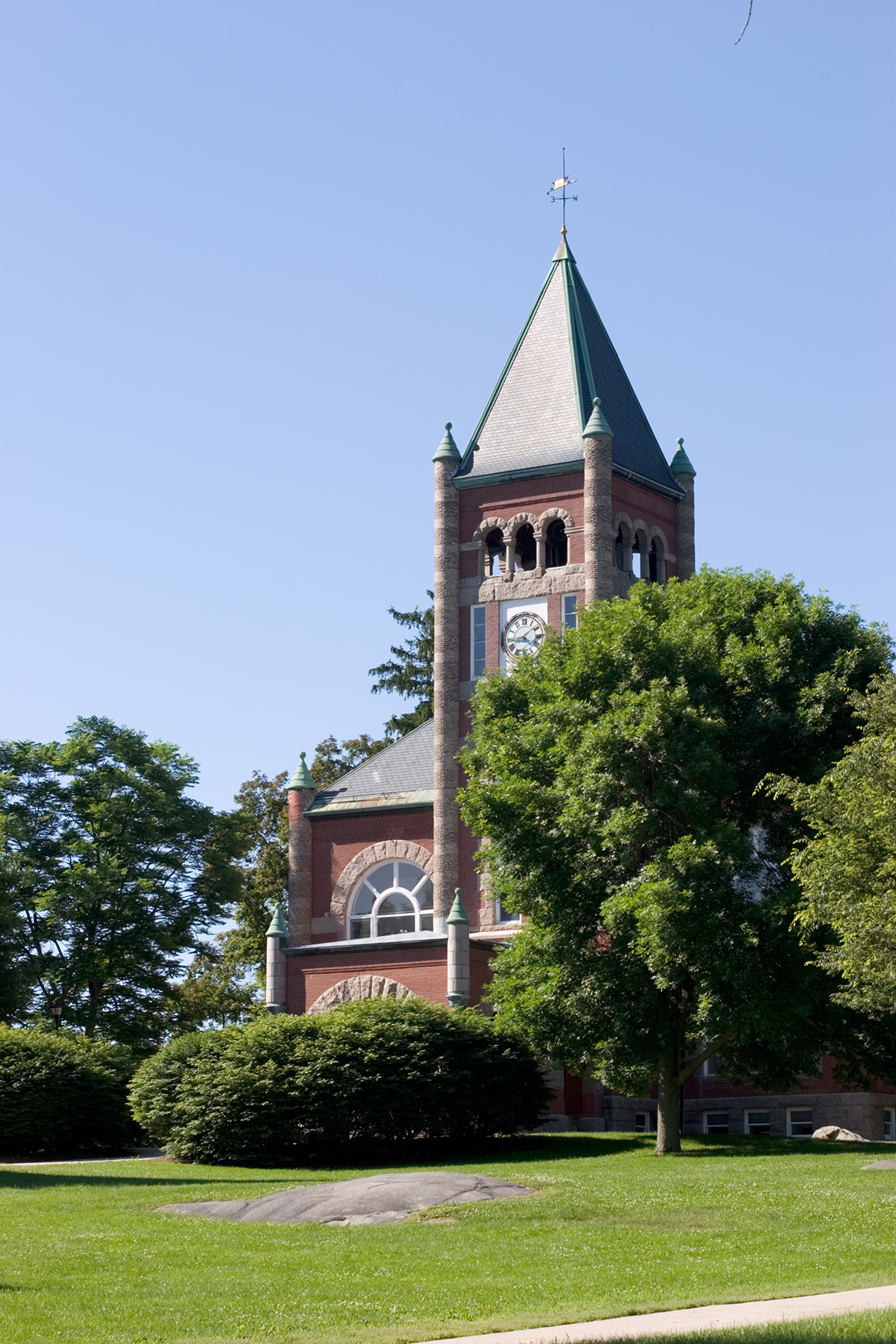
Thompson Hall, University of New Hampshire, 1892.

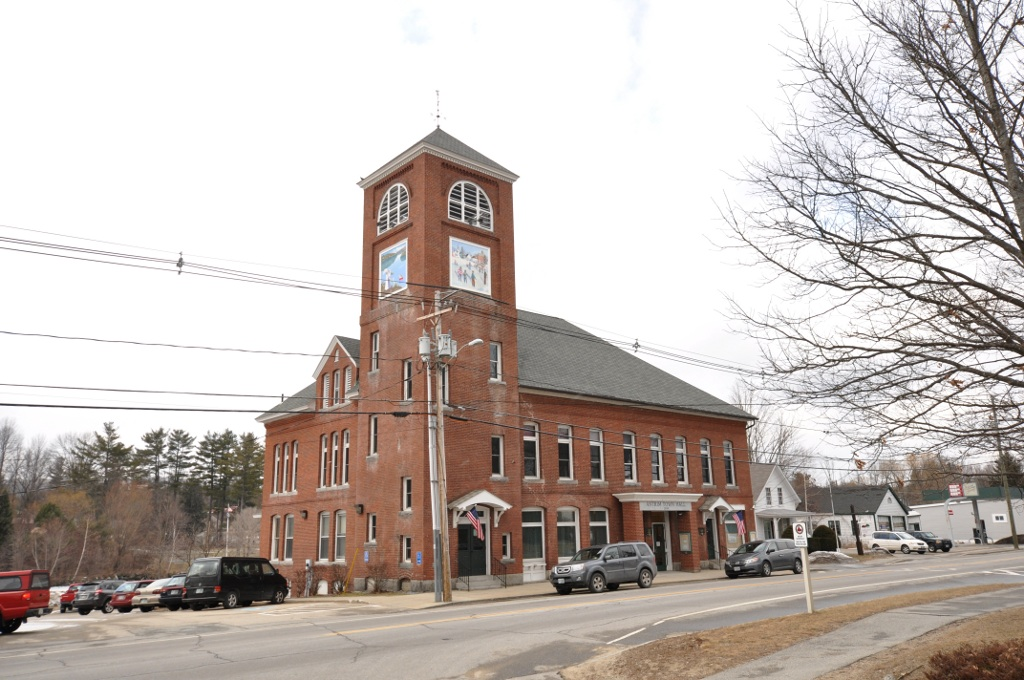
Town Hall, Antrim, 1893.

Edward Dow (July 11, 1820 – July 31, 1894) was an American architect from New Hampshire.

== Life and career ==
Dow was born in Lemington, Vermont, July 11, 1820. The son of a carpenter, he began learning his father's trade at a young age. At the age of 16, the family moved to Newport, New Hampshire, where young Dow began an apprenticeship with Ruel Durkee. In 1847 he moved to Concord and established himself as a carpenter. By 1851 he had established the firm of Colby & Dow, builders, with J. M. Colby. Around 1856 he set out on his own again, this time as an architect.

He remained in private practice until 1876, when he took Giles Wheeler (1834–1915) into Dow & Wheeler. Wheeler had, years before, apprenticed with Colby & Dow, and had rejoined the firm in 1873. The two worked together until 1885, when Wheeler left to supervise the construction of the new U. S. Post Office. However, Dow continued to practice as Dow & Wheeler until 1890. That year, James E. Randlett (1846–1909), formerly the keeper of the state house, became a partner. Dow & Randlett was dissolved upon Dow's death in 1894.

From at least 1882 until 1892, architect Albert E. Bodwell (1851–1926) was apparently Dow's chief designer. He left to establish his own office with Charles E. Sargent in 1892.

Dow's nephew, Wallace L. Dow, studied architecture with Dow & Wheeler from 1877 to 1880, when he left New Hampshire for South Dakota, where he would become a noted architect.

== Selected works ==
=== Edward Dow, c.1856-1876 ===
- 1857 - Phenix Hotel, 46 N Main St, Concord, New Hampshire
  - Demolished.
- 1859 - House for George E. Jenks, 76 School St, Concord, New Hampshire
- 1859 - St. Paul's Episcopal Church, 21 Centre St, Concord, New Hampshire
- 1860 - New Hampshire State Prison Warehouse, 2½ Beacon St, Concord, New Hampshire
- 1863 - Concord High School, 27 N State St, Concord, New Hampshire
  - Burned in 1888.
- 1866 - Littleton High School, High & School Sts, Littleton, New Hampshire
  - Demolished.
- 1866 - New Hampshire Statesman Building, 18 N Main St, Concord, New Hampshire
- 1866 - Penacook Academy, 116 N Main St, Boscawen, New Hampshire
- 1868 - Hill Block, 66 N Main St, Concord, New Hampshire
- 1868 - Trinity M. E. Church, 137 Main St, Montpelier, Vermont
- 1869 - Culver Hall, New Hampshire College, Hanover, New Hampshire
  - Demolished.
- 1872 - Charlestown Town Hall, 11 Summer St, Charlestown, New Hampshire
- 1872 - Newport Town Hall, 20 Main St, Newport, New Hampshire
  - Burned and partially rebuilt in 1885.
- 1872 - Trinity Episcopal Church, 247 Main St, Tilton, New Hampshire
- 1873 - Board of Trade Building, 83-85 N Main St, Concord, New Hampshire
  - Largely demolished.
- 1874 - Conant Hall, New Hampshire College, Hanover, New Hampshire
  - Demolished.
- 1876 - Morrill Bros. Block, 55 N Main St, Concord, New Hampshire

=== Dow & Wheeler, 1876-1882 ===
- 1877 - House for Alvah W. Sulloway, 26 Peabody Pl, Franklin, New Hampshire
  - Demolished.
- 1878 - New Hampshire State Prison, 281 N State St, Concord, New Hampshire
- 1879 - Tilton Town Hall, 257 Main St, Tilton, New Hampshire
- 1880 - Nashua Union Station, Temple St, Nashua, New Hampshire
  - Demolished.
- 1881 - Penacook Fire Station, 25 Washington St, Penacook, New Hampshire
- 1881 - The Temple, Temple Ave, Ocean Park, Maine
- 1882 - Memorial Arch, Tilton Arch Park, Northfield, New Hampshire
- 1883 - Northfield Union Church, Sondogardy Pond Rd, Northfield, New Hampshire
- 1884 - West Street Ward House, 41 West St, Concord, New Hampshire
- 1887 - Bank Block, 291 Main St, Tilton, New Hampshire
- 1887 - House for Charles C. Danforth, 39 Green St, Concord, New Hampshire
  - Demolished.
- 1887 - Perkins Inn, Old Henniker & Hopkinton Rds, Hopkinton, New Hampshire
  - Demolished.
- 1888 - Odd Fellows Building, 18 Pleasant St, Concord, New Hampshire
- 1888 - West Concord Fire Station, 450 N State St, West Concord, New Hampshire
- 1889 - "The Boulders" for A. Perley Fitch, 150 Garnet St, Sunapee, New Hampshire
  - Demolished.
- 1889 - Orphans' Home of Concord, 1942 Dunbarton Rd, Concord, New Hampshire
  - Demolished.
- 1890 - Concord Gas Light Building, 24 Bridge St, Concord, New Hampshire

=== Dow & Randlett, 1890-1894 ===
- 1892 - Bristol Savings Bank Building, 10 N Main St, Bristol, New Hampshire
- 1892 - Conant Hall, University of New Hampshire, Durham, New Hampshire
- 1892 - Epping Town Hall, 157 Main St, Epping, New Hampshire
- 1892 - Thompson Hall, University of New Hampshire, Durham, New Hampshire
- 1893 - Antrim Town Hall, 66 Main St, Antrim, New Hampshire
- 1893 - Phenix Hall, 40 N Main St, Concord, New Hampshire
- 1893 - "Pleasant View" for Mary Baker Eddy, 227 Pleasant St, Concord, New Hampshire
  - Demolished.
- 1894 - Y. M. C. A. Building, 12 N State St, Concord, New Hampshire
