= Charlestown Town Hall =

- U.S. National Register of Historic Places
- U.S. Historic district – Contributing property
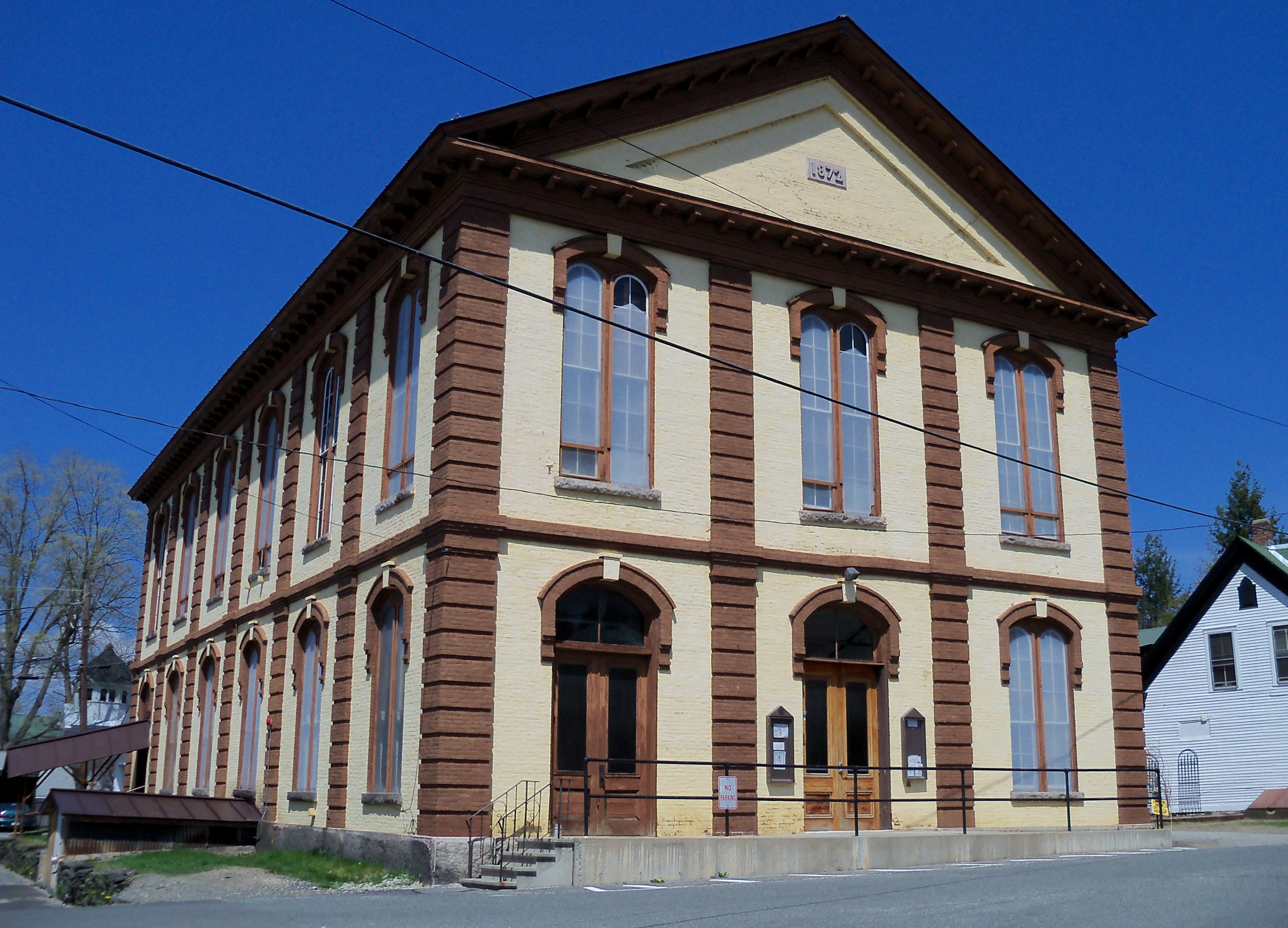

- Location within New Hampshire Location within the United States
- Location: 29 Summer St., Charlestown, New Hampshire
- Coordinates: 43°14′7″N 72°24′12″W
- Area: 0.3 acres (0.12 ha)
- Built: 1872
- Built by: A. P. Clifford
- Architect: Edward Dow
- Architectural style: Italianate
- Part of: Charlestown Main Street Historic District (ID87000835)
- NRHP reference No.: 84003252

Significant dates
- Added to NRHP: March 15, 1984
- Designated CP: June 10, 1987

Charlestown Town Hall is the seat of municipal government of Charlestown, New Hampshire. It is located just off Main Street (New Hampshire Route 12) at 29 Summer Street. It was built in 1872-73, and is a design of Edward Dow, one of New Hampshire's leading architects of the period. The building was listed on the National Register of Historic Places in 1984, and is a contributing property to the Charlestown Main Street Historic District.

== Description and history ==
Charlestown Town Hall is located in the town's village center, on the north side of Summer Street a short way east of Main Street. It is a two-story masonry building on a granite foundation, with a gabled roof. It has Italianate styling, with rusticated brick pilasters separating the bays and a corbelled brick cornice between the floors. Window bays are topped by brick segmented arches with keystones. Each window opening has a pair of rounded-arch windows, while two of the ground-floor bays on the south-facing main facade have doorways. The ground floor houses offices and a space formerly used as a courtroom, and an expansive lobby has a stairway leading to a large auditorium on the second floor.

The town hall was built in 1872-73 on land taken from Simeon Cooley, who was allowed to operate a grocery in one of the ground floor spaces in exchange for the land. The building was designed by Edward Dow, and is one of a series of municipal buildings which cemented his reputation as one of the state's leading architects. The building was electrified in 1908, and its internal systems have been regularly updated.

== See also ==
- National Register of Historic Places listings in Sullivan County, New Hampshire
