= Gilmanton Academy =

- U.S. National Register of Historic Places
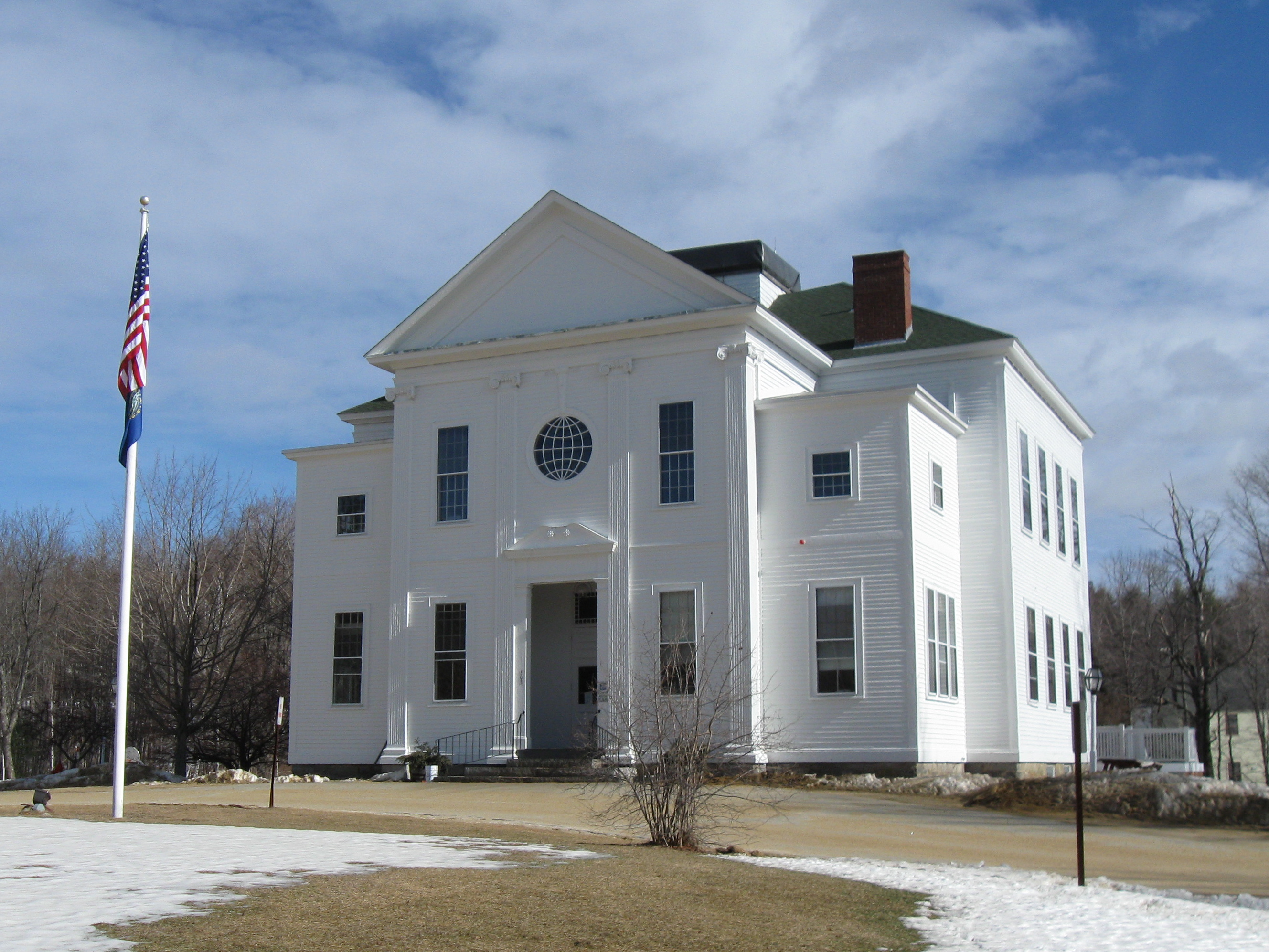

- Location within New Hampshire Location within the United States
- Location: Province Rd., Gilmanton, New Hampshire
- Coordinates: 43°25′30″N 71°24′50″W
- Area: 1.6 acres (0.65 ha)
- Built: 1894; 132 years ago
- Architect: Bodwell & Sargent
- Architectural style: Colonial Revival
- NRHP reference No.: 83001127
- Added to NRHP: September 8, 1983

Gilmanton Academy is a historic school building on Province Road in Gilmanton, New Hampshire. Built in 1894, it is a well-preserved example of a 19th-century academy building, and was one of the last to be built in the state. The building, now housing town offices and the local historical society, was listed on the National Register of Historic Places in 1983.

== Description and history ==
The former Gilmanton Academy building occupies a prominent location in the village center of Gilmanton, at the back of a semicircular drive between the Congregational church and the public library. It is a 2-1/2 story wood frame structure, its main section covered by a hip roof and wooden clapboards. A projecting gabled section to the front, and a hip-roofed section to the rear, combine to give the building a roughly cruciform shape. The inner corners on either side of the front projection are filled by single-bay two-story blocks with a lower profile. The front gable facade has fluted corner pilasters, which rise to an entablature and fully pedimented gable. The entrance is recessed in the center bay, which is also articulated by pilasters, with the recess topped by an entablature and broken gable pediment.

The current building was erected in 1894, and was the third main building for the Academy, which was founded in 1794 as a private school. It is one of the last private academy buildings to be built in the state, which had ten years earlier required towns to fund secondary education, leading to a decline in enrollments at such private schools. The building was designed by Bodwell & Sargent of Concord, one of whose principals was a Gilmanton native. The school closed in 1910, and the building was leased to the town for use as a school in 1916. It served first as the town's public high school, and then as an elementary school, until 1966. It is now owned by the town, and houses the town clerk's office.

The unincorporated and uninhabited township of Atkinson and Gilmanton Academy Grant in northern New Hampshire is named in part for the academy, to which it was originally granted.

== See also ==
- National Register of Historic Places listings in Belknap County, New Hampshire
