= James E. Randlett =

American architect

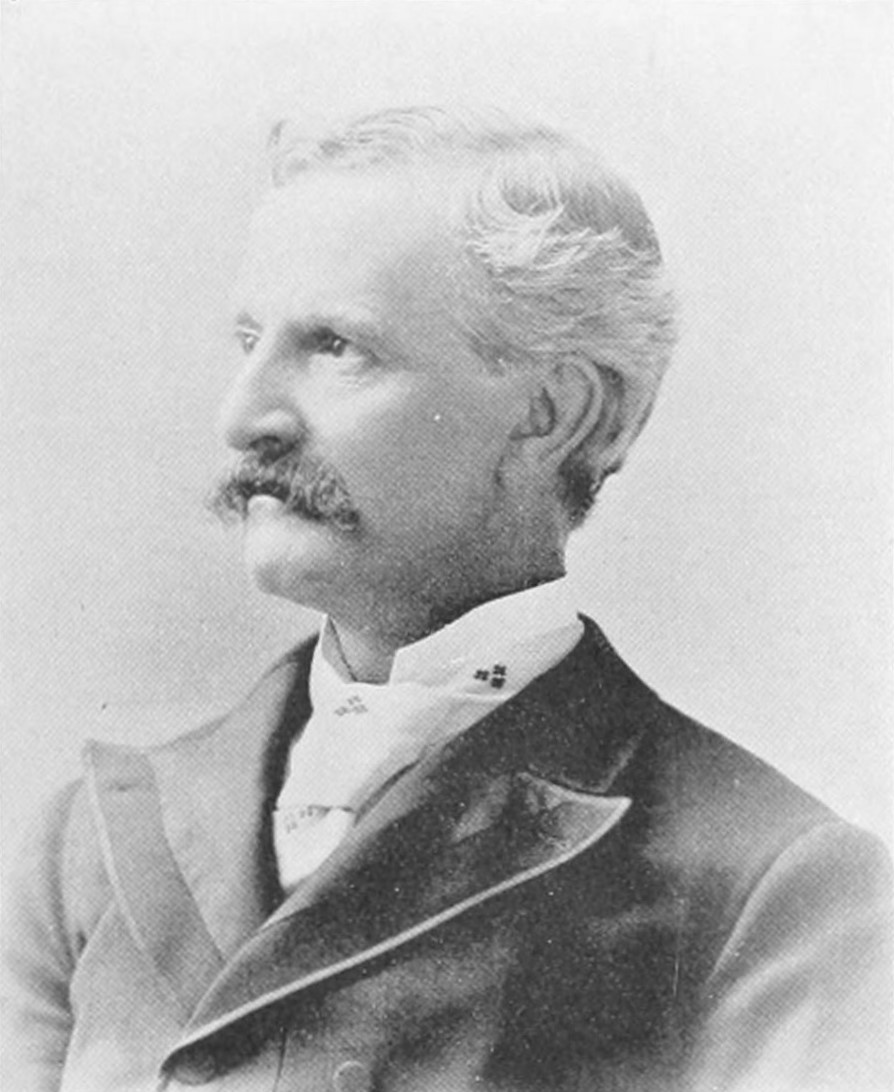
- James E. Randlett, 1893.
- Born: September 5, 1846; Quincy, Massachusetts, U.S.
- Died: 1909 (aged 62–63); Lake Winnipesaukee, New Hampshire, U.S.
- Occupation: Architect

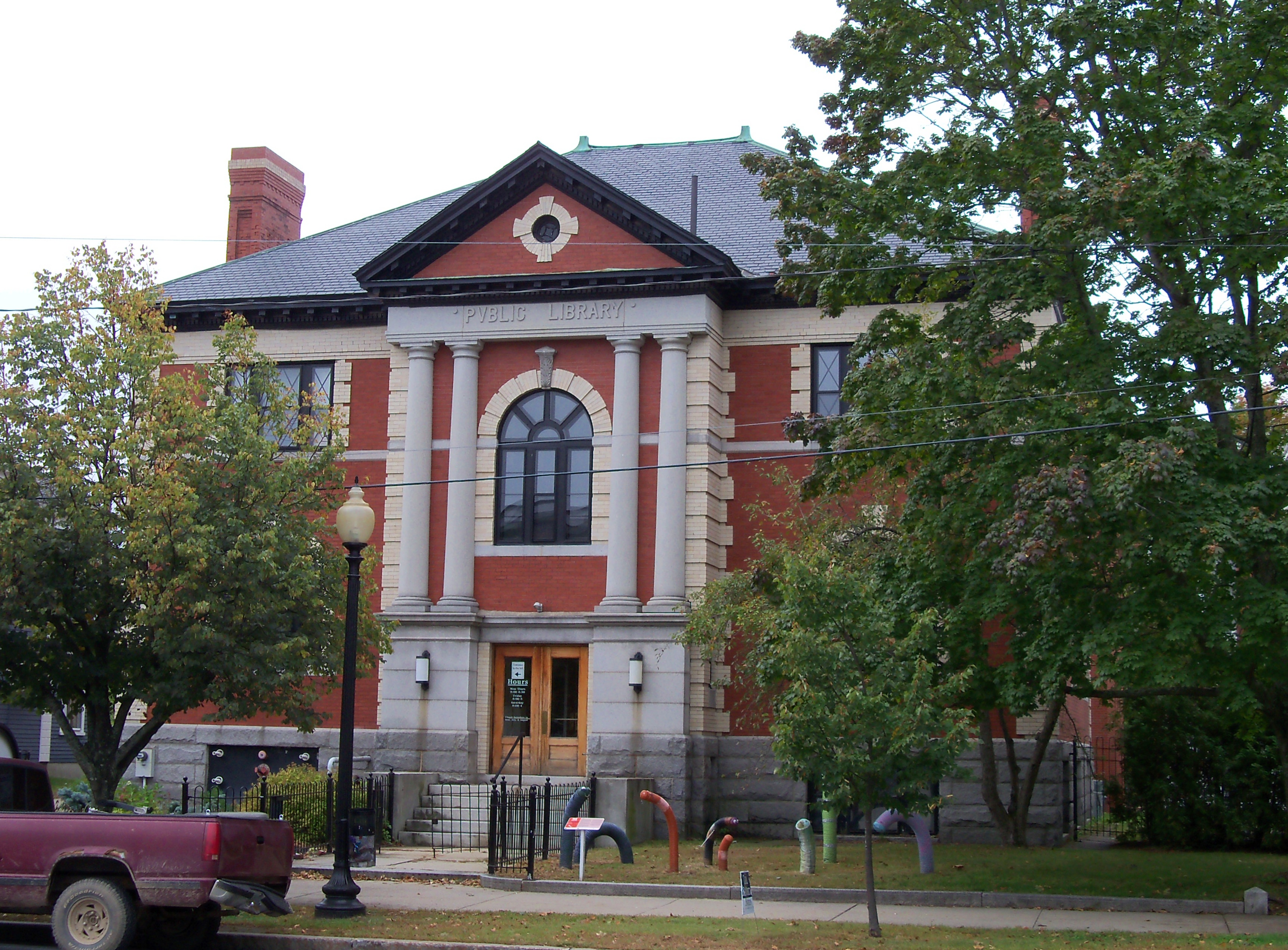
The Rochester Public Library, Rochester, New Hampshire (1904-05) was designed by Randlett and Griffin.

James E. Randlett (September 5, 1846 – 1909) was an American architect from Concord, New Hampshire.

== Life ==
Randlett was born in Quincy, Massachusetts, in 1846. As a young child, his family moved to Gilmanton, New Hampshire. As a teenager he enlisted in the Union Army as a drummer boy, serving for three years. At the war's end he went to Concord, where he learned the carpenter's trade. During the 1880s he became the keeper of the New Hampshire State House, at which position he remained for four years. In 1890, he became the partner of noted local architect Edward Dow, as Dow & Randlett. Their partnership lasted until Dow's death in 1894.

Randlett was briefly associated with George B. Howe as Randlett & Howe, but was soon practicing independently. In 1903 he partnered with George W. Griffin (1873-1957). Their partnership, Randlett & Griffin, survived until Randlett drowned in Lake Winnipesaukee in 1909.

Griffin continued the practice under his own name until shortly before his death.

== Architectural works ==
=== Dow & Randlett, 1890-1894 ===
- Bristol Savings Bank Building, 10 N. Main St., Bristol, New Hampshire (1892–93)
- Conant Hall, University of New Hampshire, Durham, New Hampshire (1892)
- Epping Town Hall, 157 Main St., Epping, New Hampshire (1892–93)
- Thompson Hall, University of New Hampshire, Durham, New Hampshire (1892)
- Antrim Town Hall, 66 Main St., Antrim, New Hampshire (1893–94)
- Phenix Hall, 40 N. Main St., Concord, New Hampshire (1893)
- Pleasant View (Mary Baker Eddy House), 227 Pleasant St., Concord, New Hampshire (1893) - Demolished.
- Y. M. C. A. Building, 12 N. State St., Concord, New Hampshire (1894)

=== James E. Randlett, c.1895-1903 ===
- Dewey School, 38 Liberty St., Concord, New Hampshire (1900–01)
- Rumford School, 40 Thorndike St., Concord, New Hampshire (1901)
- Morrill Hall, University of New Hampshire, Durham, New Hampshire (1902)
- Woodstock High School, 15 South St., Woodstock, Vermont (1903) - Demolished.

=== Randlett & Griffin, 1903-1909 ===
- Dover Public Library, 73 Locust St., Dover, New Hampshire (1903–04)
- Henry C. Whipple House, 75 Summer St., Bristol, New Hampshire (1904)
- Rochester Public Library, 65 S. Main St., Rochester, New Hampshire (1904–05)
- Garrison School, 17 Knight St., West Concord, New Hampshire (1905–06)
- New Hampshire Hall, University of New Hampshire, Durham, New Hampshire (1905) - Altered.

=== George W. Griffin, after 1909 ===
- Hattie Tuttle Folsom Memorial School, 41 Main St., Pittsfield, New Hampshire (1910)
- Lane Memorial Library, 65 S. Main St., Hampton, New Hampshire (1910)
- Hayes Building, 14-44 Granite St., Haverhill, Massachusetts (1911)
- Monitor & Statesman Building, 10 Pleasant St., Concord, New Hampshire (1912)

== Gallery ==
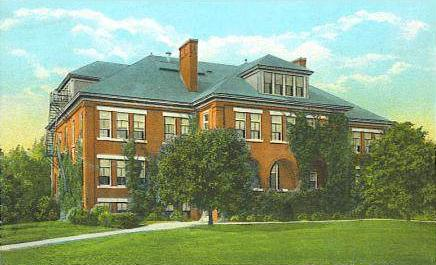
Morrill Hall, University of New Hampshire, 1902.

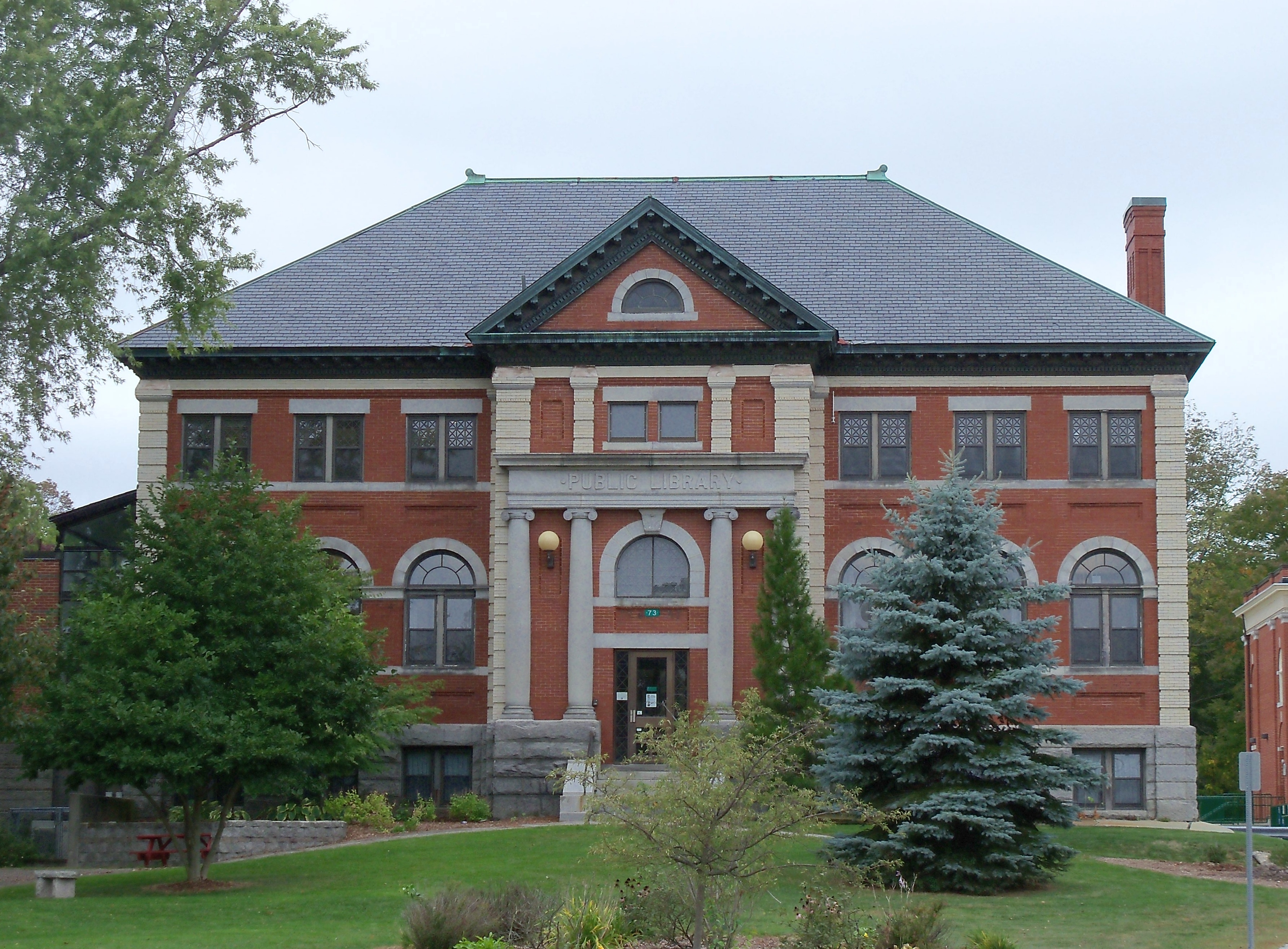
Dover Public Library, Dover, 1903.

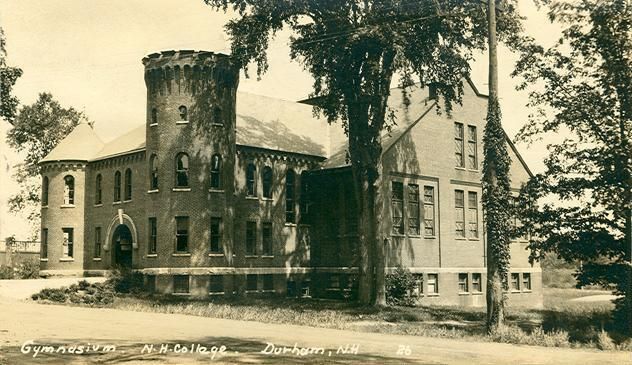
New Hampshire Hall, University of New Hampshire, 1905.

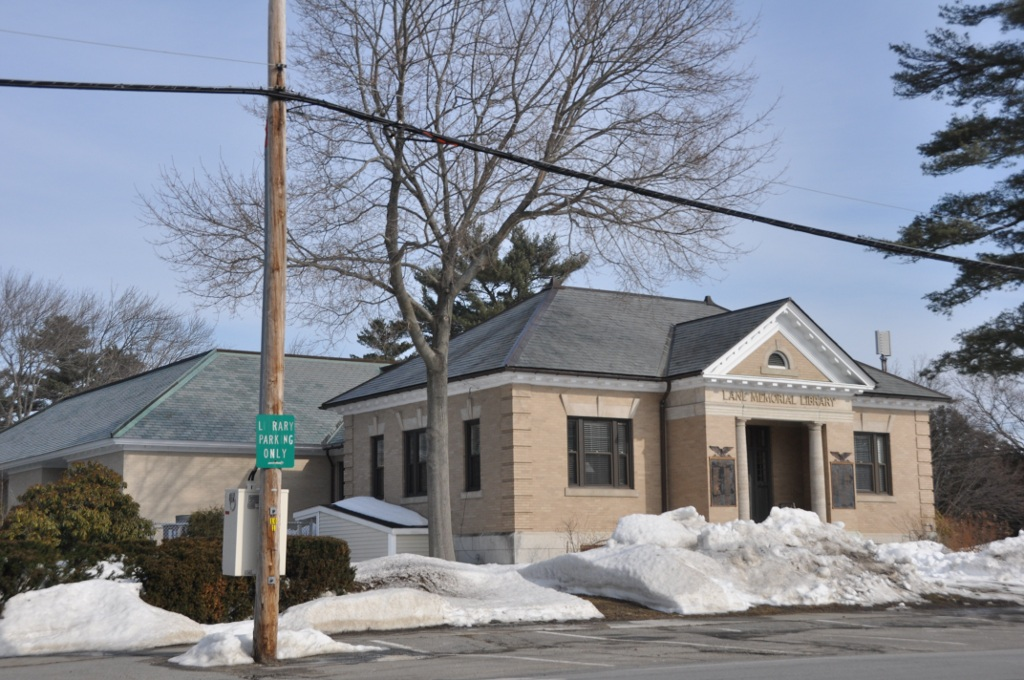
Lane Memorial Library, Hampton, 1910.
