= The Temple (Old Orchard Beach, Maine) =

Historic church in Maine, United States

- U.S. National Register of Historic Places
- U.S. Historic district – Contributing property
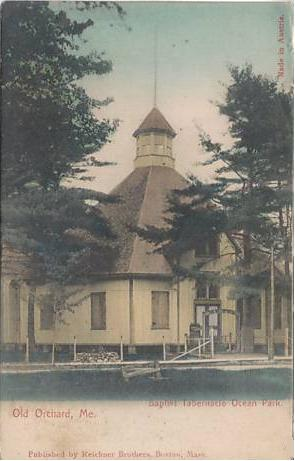
- Free Baptist Tabernacle in Ocean Park

- Location within Maine Location within the United States
- Location: Old Orchard Beach, Maine
- Coordinates: 43°30′8″N 70°23′22″W
- Built: 1881
- Built by: James Bickford
- Architect: Dow & Wheeler
- Architectural style: Octagon Mode
- Part of: Ocean Park Historic Buildings (ID82000796)
- NRHP reference No.: 75000119

Significant dates
- Added to NRHP: April 28, 1975
- Designated CP: March 2, 1982

The Temple is a historic octagon-shaped Baptist church building on Temple Avenue in the Ocean Park area of Old Orchard Beach, Maine. Built in 1881, it is the centerpiece of the summer camp meeting established in 1880 by Free Will Baptists led by Bates College President Oren Cheney. It is the only known octagonal religious structure in use in the state, although there are octagonal belfries such as that of New Sharon Congregational Church.

The temple was listed in the National Register of Historic Places in 1975, and included in the Ocean Park Historic Buildings district in 1982.

== Description and history ==
The Temple is set on the north side of Temple Avenue, in an area known as Temple Square. Flanking it are two other buildings associated with the camp meeting: Porter Hall and B.C. Jordan Memorial Hall. It is a two-story wood frame structure, capped by an octagonal hip roof whose elements meet at a central cupola. It is finished in wooden clapboards and rests on a foundation of brick piers. The main facade, facing south, is three bays wide, with a central projecting entry section topped by a doubled gable roof. This section has a double door on the first level and a double sash window above, while the flanking bays have single sash windows. The east and west-facing walls have similar organization, but only a single gable roof. The north wall has a low storage area projecting from it. The interior of the building is a large open hall, with the speaker's platform on the north wall, and seating, much of it original, arrayed facing it.

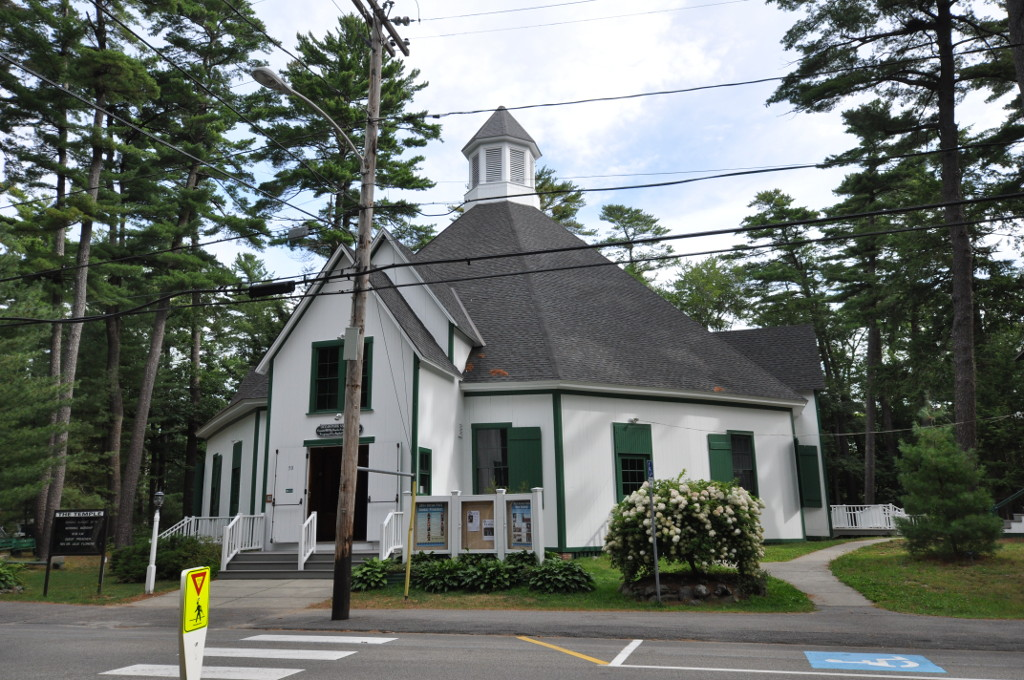
The Temple in 2014

The idea of an oceanfront camp meeting community arose at a meeting of Free Will Baptists in Weirs Beach, New Hampshire in 1880. Land was acquired in northern Saco (which Old Orchard Beach was then still part of), and summer cottages were soon built. This building was constructed in 1881 by James Bickford to a design by Dow & Wheeler, inspired in part by the popularization of octagon houses by Orson Squire Fowler in the 1840s and 1850s. The Temple continues to be a central focus of the summer community in Ocean Park.

== See also ==
- National Register of Historic Places listings in York County, Maine
