= Charlestown Main Street Historic District =

Historic district in New Hampshire, United States

- U.S. National Register of Historic Places
- U.S. Historic district
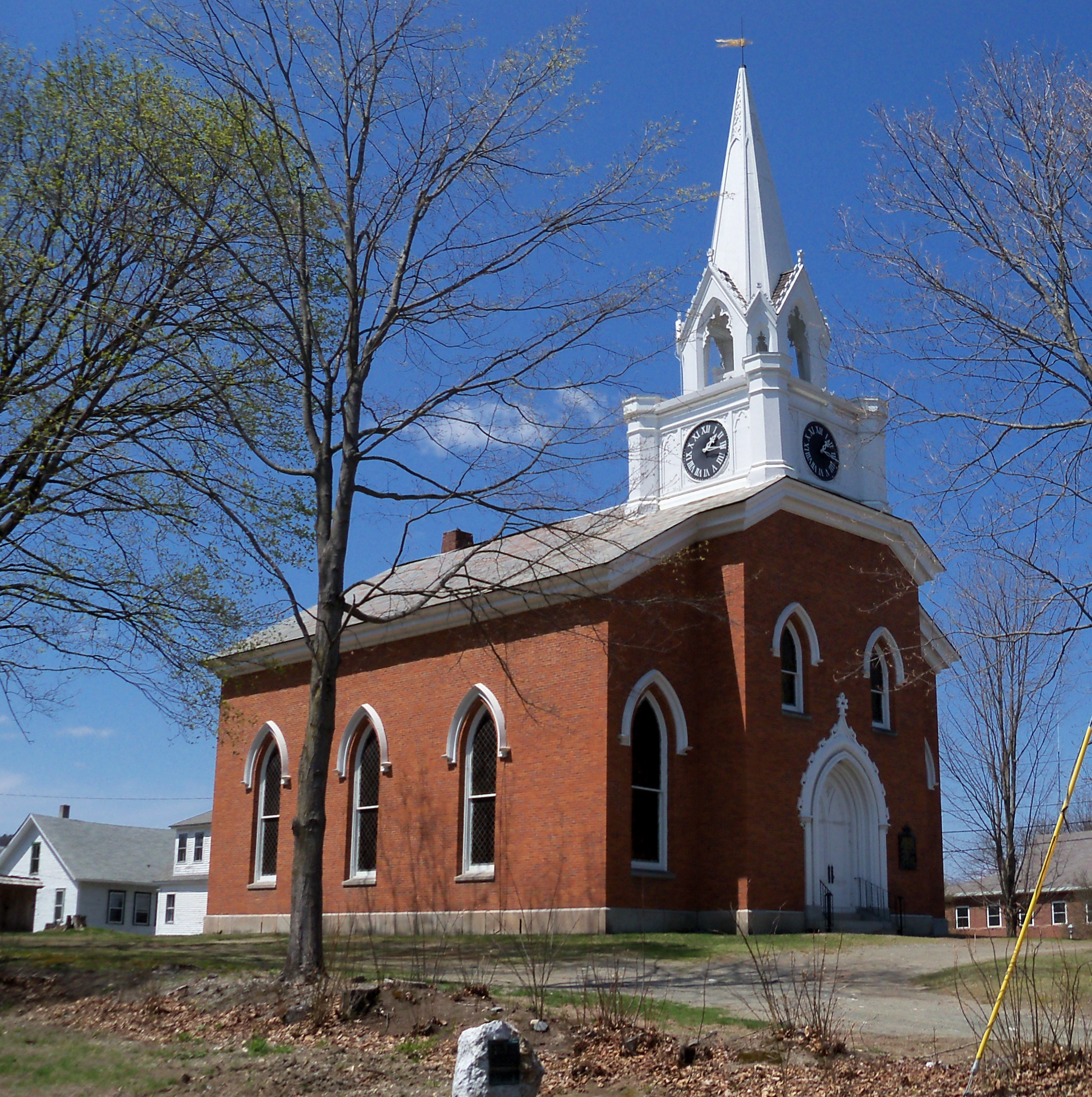
- South Parish Unitarian Church

- Location within New Hampshire Location within the United States
- Location: Main St., Charlestown, New Hampshire
- Area: 53 acres (21 ha)
- Architect: Stephen Hassam, others
- Architectural style: Greek Revival, Federal, American Foursquare
- NRHP reference No.: 87000835
- Added to NRHP: June 10, 1987

The Charlestown Main Street Historic District encompasses the historic heart of Charlestown, New Hampshire. It is located along Main Street (New Hampshire Route 12), roughly between Lower Landing Road and Bridge Street, and encapsulates more than two hundred years of the town's history. The district was listed on the National Register of Historic Places in 1987.

Charlestown, located on the banks of the Connecticut River in southwestern New Hampshire, was chartered as Number Four by the Province of Massachusetts Bay in 1734, and rechartered by the Province of New Hampshire in 1753. Massachusetts built a fort (recreated as a museum in the Fort at Number 4, north of the district) in 1740, which was for some time the northernmost European settlement on the river. Development of Charlestown's center did not begin until 1763, when Main Street was laid out. There are ten buildings in the district which were built before 1800, including a 1772 brick schoolhouse, now a private home, and the c. 1752 Johnson House.

Most of the development in central Charlestown took place in the 19th century. A number of buildings which survived a major fire in 1842 where Federal-style buildings designed by local builder Stephen Hassam, including his own house (c. 1800), the Rick's Electric building at 72 Main, and the former Connecticut River Bank building. The latter two are particularly fine examples of Federal style executed in brick. Also attributed to Hassam is the brick South Parish Unitarian Church (1842).

Notable buildings of the second half of the 19th century include the Italianate Town Hall (separately listed on the National Register), and St. Luke's Episcopal Church, a wood-frame Gothic Revival structure inspired by the works of Richard Upjohn. The Silsby Free Library was built 1893–94, funded by a bequest from Ithiel Silsby, and built in the Richardsonian Romanesque style to a design by Boston, Massachusetts, architect C. C. McAlpine.

== See also ==
- National Register of Historic Places listings in Sullivan County, New Hampshire
