= 2½ Beacon Street =

- 2 1/2 Beacon Street
- U.S. National Register of Historic Places
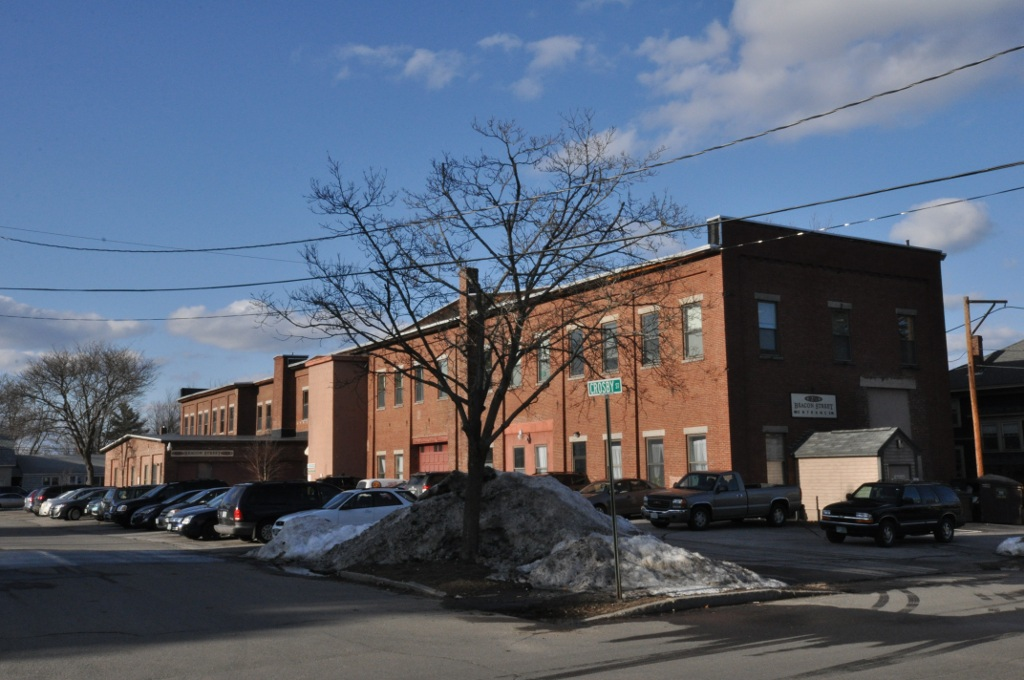

- Location within New Hampshire Location within the United States
- Location: 2 1/2 Beacon St., Concord, New Hampshire
- Coordinates: 43°12′42″N 71°32′33″W
- Area: less than one acre
- Built: 1860
- Architect: Edward Dow
- NRHP reference No.: 84000500
- Added to NRHP: December 17, 1984

2 1/2 Beacon Street, also known as the former New Hampshire State Prison Warehouse, is a historic commercial building at 2 1/2 Beacon Street in Concord, New Hampshire. Built in 1860 and enlarged in 1868, it is the only major surviving element of New Hampshire's first state prison complex, which was mostly torn down in the 1890s. The building was listed on the National Register of Historic Places in 1984.

== Description and history ==
2 1/2 Beacon Street is located on the west side of downtown Concord, extending north–south on the west side of a block bounded by Beacon, Tremont, and Crosby Streets. It is a two-story brick building, 240 feet (73 m) in length, with a single-story projection on the west side, facing Crosby Street. The long facade is basically divided into 15 bays articulated by brick pilasters. Each bay is filled with a combination of windows or doors and windows, originally with some regularity, but with many subsequent alterations. Original window openings were rectangular, with granite sills and lintels, but several have been altered to accommodate doors, and some bays now have large garage-style doors on the ground floor.

The building was built in 1860, with an addition on the north side added in 1868. Its original function was to provide a workshop for prisoners in the adjacent correctional facility. It served in this capacity until the entire prison complex was closed and sold by the state in 1880. In the 1890s the bulk of the prison was demolished by the Amoskeag Manufacturing Company, which used its finished stone elements for construction projects in Manchester. This building remained, and thereafter served a variety of commercial and industrial uses before being converted to office space.

== See also ==
- National Register of Historic Places listings in Merrimack County, New Hampshire
