= Washington Street Shoe District =

Historic district in Massachusetts, United States

- U.S. National Register of Historic Places
- U.S. Historic district
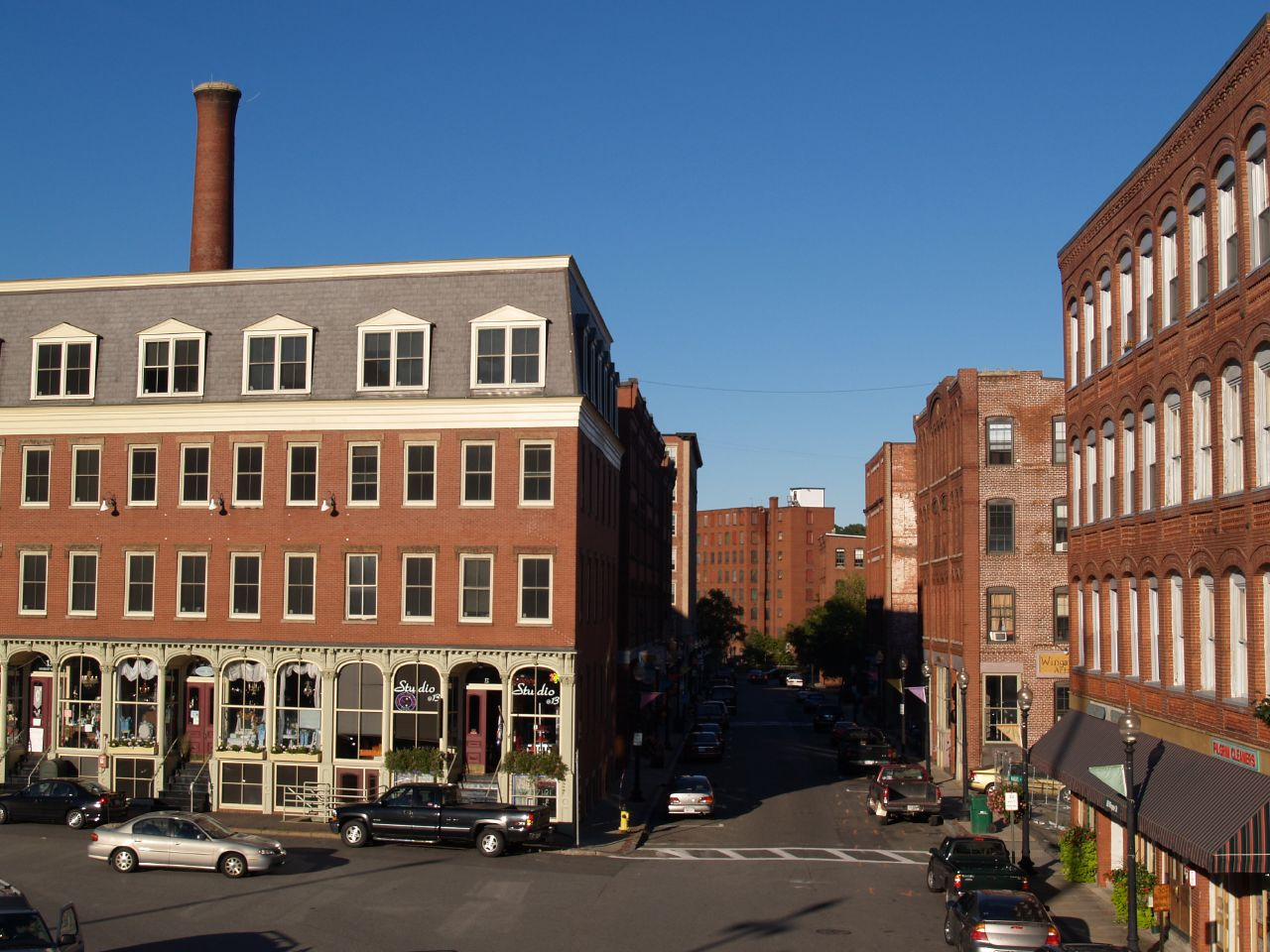
- Wingate Street

- Location within Massachusetts Location within the United States
- Location: Haverhill, Massachusetts
- Coordinates: 42°46′25″N 71°5′5″W
- Built: 1856
- Architect: Littlefield, Josiah M.; Multiple
- Architectural style: Italianate, Queen Anne, Romanesque
- NRHP reference No.: 76000257
- Added to NRHP: October 14, 1976

The Washington Street Shoe District of Haverhill, Massachusetts encompasses a two block section of Washington and Wingate Streets, between Railroad Square and Essex Street, in which there were more than 60 shoe factories established in the late 19th century. Buildings in the district are predominantly brick with Italianate styling, and are of a modest scale (three or four stories), unlike later shoe factories which resembled textile mills in size and style. The district was listed on the National Register of Historic Places in 1976.

== See also ==
- National Register of Historic Places listings in Essex County, Massachusetts
