= Memorial Arch of Tilton =

- U.S. National Register of Historic Places
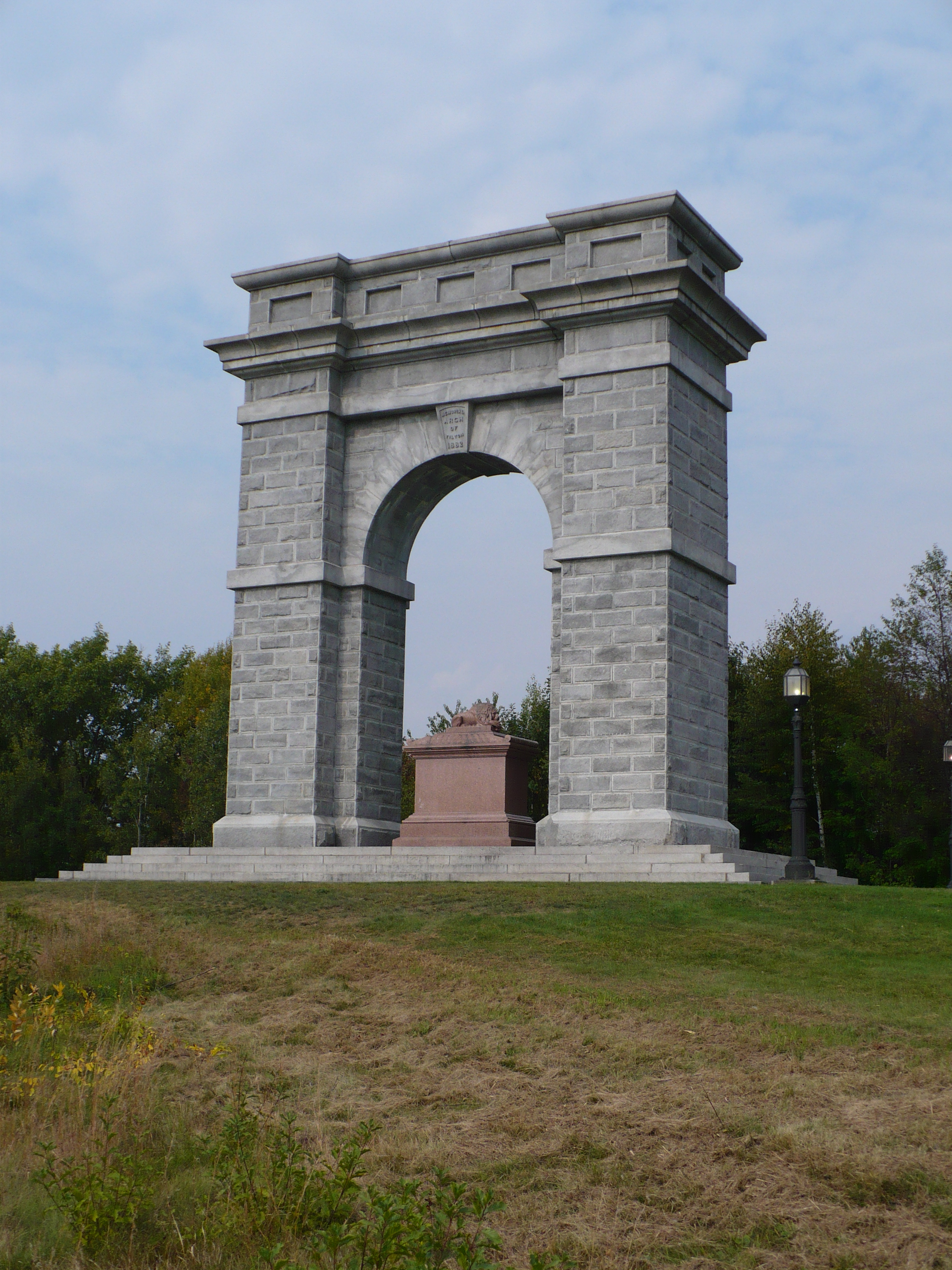

- Location within New Hampshire Location within the United States
- Location: Elm St., Northfield, New Hampshire, US
- Coordinates: 43°26′23″N 71°35′17″W
- Area: 2 acres (0.81 ha)
- Built: 1882
- Architect: Dow & Wheeler
- Architectural style: Classical Revival
- NRHP reference No.: 80000296
- Added to NRHP: May 19, 1980

The Memorial Arch of Tilton, sometimes referred to as Tilton's Folly, or simply the Tilton Arch is a historic arch on Elm Street in Northfield, New Hampshire, United States, on a hill overlooking the town of Tilton. The 55-foot-tall arch (17 m) was built by Charles E. Tilton in 1882; it was modeled after the Arch of Titus in Rome, its surfaces, however, modeled in the rustication that was currently a fashionable feature of Romanesque revival building. The Memorial Arch of Tilton was added to the National Register of Historic Places in 1980.

== History ==
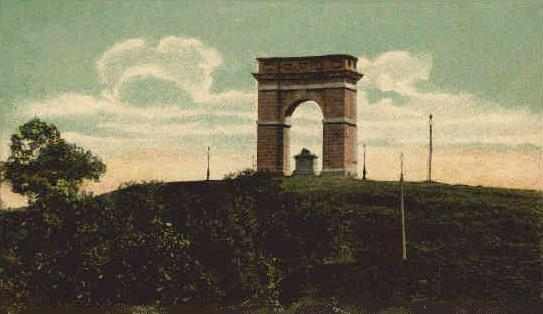
Arch in 1909

Charles E. Tilton was inspired to create a triumphal arch in 1881, when he visited Rome. While there he saw the Arch of Titus and decided to create a similar structure in his town to "symbolize the victories of peace rather than those of war." Ironically he chose to build this monument to peace on top of an old Indian fort at the apex of a local hill.

For an architect, Tilton chose the Concord firm of Dow & Wheeler. He had previously employed them as the architects of the Tilton Town Hall, which he had built in 1879. Construction was completed on the Memorial Arch in 1882 at a price of 50,000 dollars.

By the early 1980s the monument had been added to the National Register of Historic Places, but showed signs of neglect. In 1984 it was repaired and cleaned. Plants growing out of cracks in the top of the arch were removed and the monument itself was sandblasted and repointed. A park around the monument was also created at this time including the addition of picnic tables and grills.

== Description ==
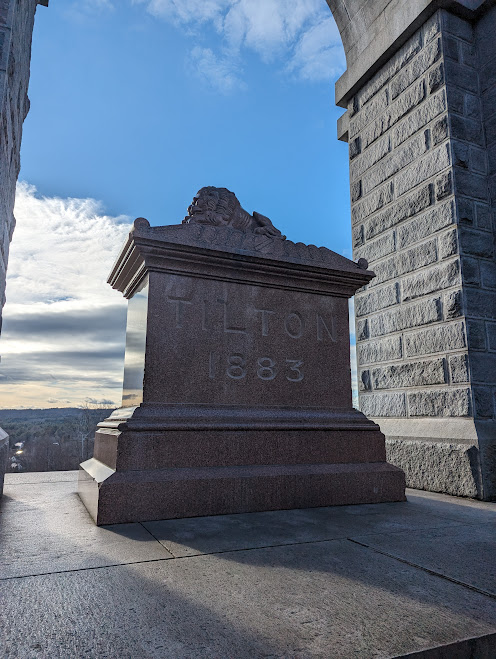
The red granite Nunidian lion beneath the keystone.

The Memorial Arch of Tilton is 55 feet (17 m) tall, 40 feet (12 m) wide, and is constructed of Concord granite. It sits atop a hill 150 feet (46 m) above the Winnipesaukee River, and its foundation goes into the earth 16 feet (4.9 m). At its base is a 50-ton sarcophagus and red granite "Numidian lion." Tilton intended to be buried in this monument. He was instead buried roughly a mile west, in Park Cemetery in Tilton.

When the Memorial Arch was built, gas lamps were placed at each corner of the monument to illuminate it. Because there were no electric street lights in Tilton at this time, the arch was the only illuminated object for miles.

Tilton also commissioned other monuments around the town of Tilton, including allegorical depictions of America, Europe, Asia, and a statue of a local Indian chief.

=== Keystone ===
The keystone of the arch is 5 feet (1.5 m) tall and 12 feet (3.7 m) deep. It is inscribed "Memorial Arch of Tilton" and "1882" on each end. Inside the keystone is a time capsule of sorts; it is a lead box with then-current newspapers from the erection period of the arch, a copy of Successful Men of New Hampshire, a history of Sanbornton, New Hampshire, and gold and silver coins.

== See also ==
- National Register of Historic Places listings in Merrimack County, New Hampshire
