= Northfield Union Church =

Historic church in New Hampshire, United States

- U.S. National Register of Historic Places
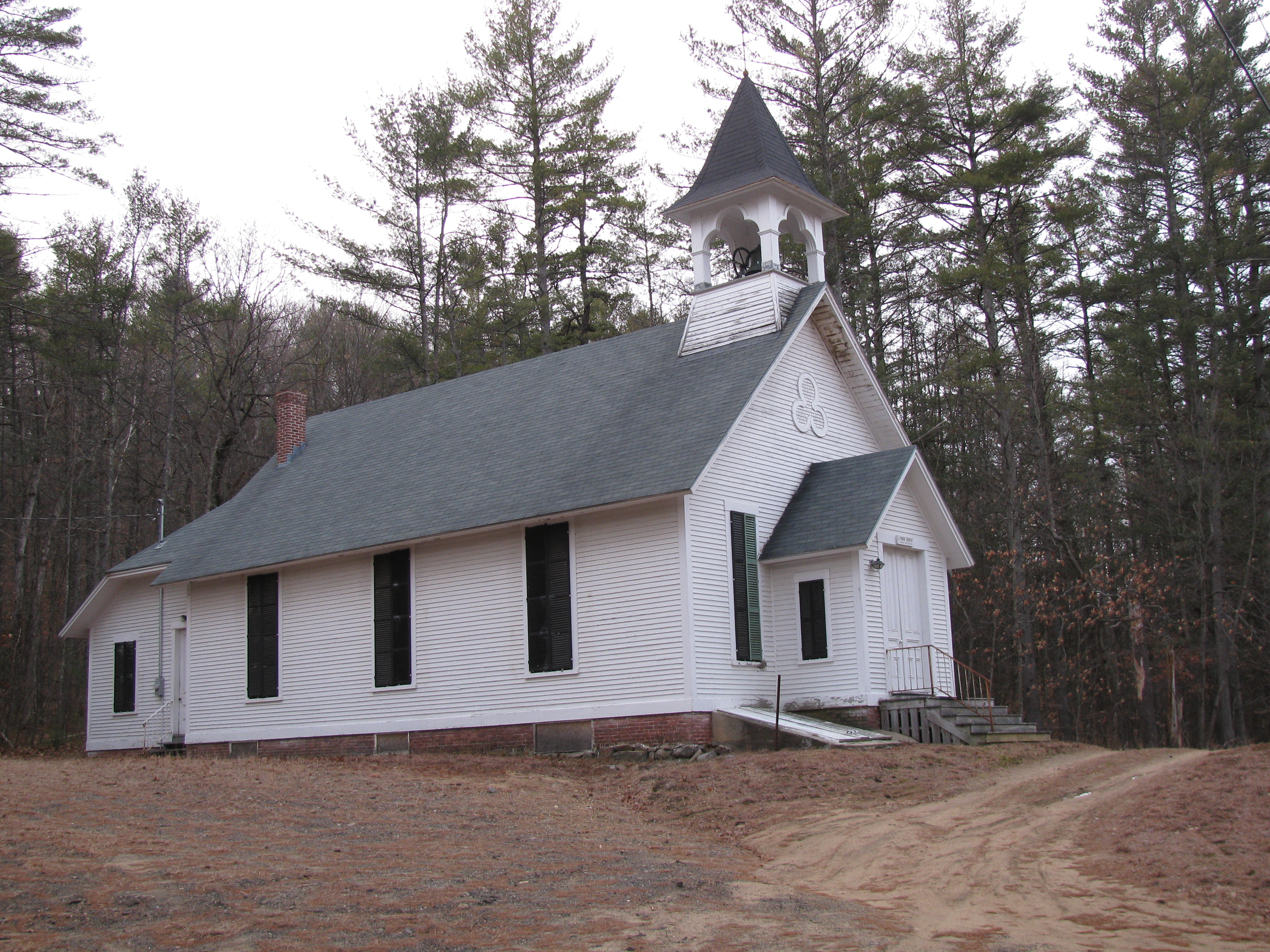
- Church in 2010

- Location within New Hampshire Location within the United States
- Location: Sondogardy Pond Rd., Northfield, New Hampshire
- Coordinates: 43°22′39″N 71°37′06″W
- Area: 2.3 acres (0.93 ha)
- Built: 1883
- Architect: Dow & Wheeler
- Architectural style: Late Gothic Revival
- NRHP reference No.: 84003219
- Added to NRHP: March 15, 1984

Northfield Union Church is a historic church on Sondogardy (also spelled "Sandogardy") Pond Road in Northfield, New Hampshire. Built in 1883, it is an example of modest Carpenter Gothic architecture, designed by Edward Dow, one of New Hampshire's leading late-19th century architects. It was added to the National Register of Historic Places in 1984.

== Description ==
The Northfield Union Church is located in an isolated rural setting in southern Northfield, on the west side of Sondogardy Pond Road. It is a single-story wood-frame structure, with a gabled roof and clapboarded exterior. The main block of the structure is topped by an open belfry with trefoil arches in the openings, and a pyramidal roof that has a flared base. An enclosed vestibule projects from the front facade, with a gabled roof. A second extension projects to the rear, covered by a clipped-gable roof. The interior is simply organized, with the entry vestibule, main sanctuary, and vestry area at the back.

== History ==
In 1882, a movement was started by O. L. Cross to build a church and hall to serve the southern portion of Northfield. To this end, an association was formed, and Charles E. Tilton, a textile mill owner, was invited to assist. Tilton drew up a document offering to pay for a substantial portion of the church if the town of Northfield would take ownership, provide money for the building's upkeep, and allow any congregations that so desired to meet there on Sundays free of charge. If more than one congregation wished to meet there, they would do so on a rotating basis. The town adopted a measure agreeing to these conditions, property was purchased near the Northfield Depot, and construction began. A dedicatory service was conducted at 2:00 pm on August 21, 1883. The building was used by Freewill Baptists, Congregationalists, Methodists, and Adventists.

== See also ==
- National Register of Historic Places listings in Merrimack County, New Hampshire
