= Ocean Park, Maine =

American village in New England

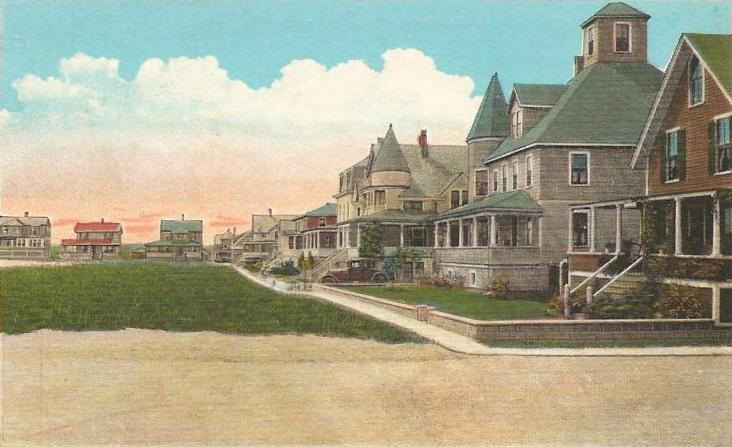
Community view, c. 1920

Ocean Park is a village in the town of Old Orchard Beach in York County, Maine, United States. A historic family style summer community affiliated with the Free Will Baptists, the community is located in southern Old Orchard Beach on Saco Bay. Rooted in the Chautauqua tradition, it is occasionally referred to as "Chautauqua-by-the-Sea." The ZIP Code for Ocean Park is 04063.

== History ==
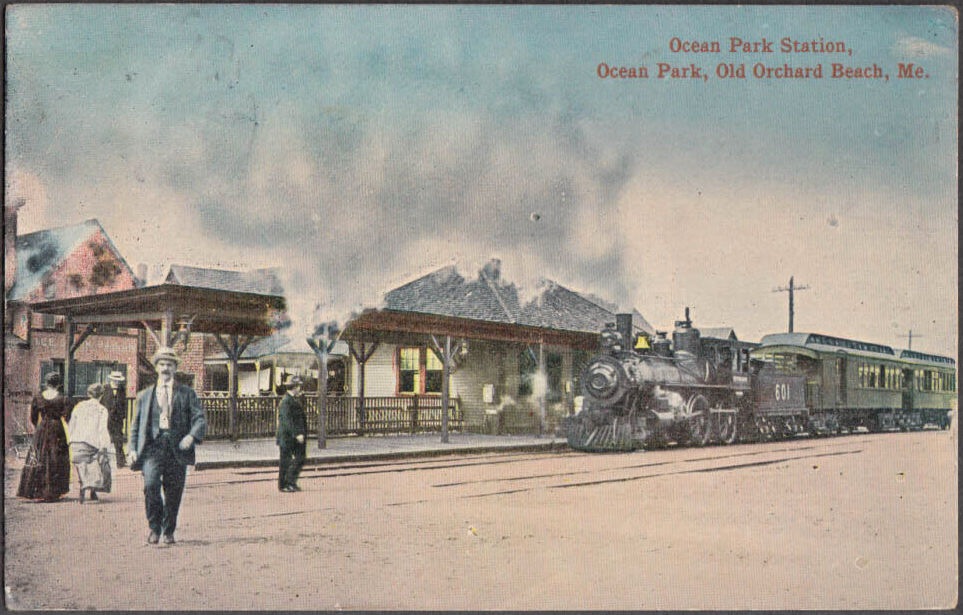
Postcard of the Ocean Park train station

The main institutional buildings in Ocean Park were mainly constructed in the 1880s in a Classical Revival style. The site was home to a large Free Will Baptist meeting site, organized in 1881 largely by Bates College President Oren B. Cheney. One of the prominent buildings is the Free Baptist Tabernacle Temple, a large octagonal meeting hall serving as the central gathering place of the camp. The style was similar to other prominent summer church camp meetings such those at Ocean Grove, New Jersey and Wesleyan Grove on Martha's Vineyard.

== References in popular culture ==
- In the novel "La Mémoire du Tueur" - Memory of the killer, from French-Canadian writer Sylvain Johnson. Actions taking place in Old Orchard Beach and the Billow House located in Ocean park. December 2015.
- Ocean Park is the main location of the novel "Le Joueur de flute de Hamelin" - "The Pipe Piper of Hamelin" from French-Canadian writer Sylvain Johnson. Old Orchard beach and the Billow House are also in the novel. April 2018
