= List of current trustees of the University System of New Hampshire =

The University System of New Hampshire is governed by a 28-member board of trustees comprising the governor, the Senate president, the House speaker, ten members appointed by the governor and Executive Council, six alumni-elected members, three student-elected members, the education commissioner, the agriculture commissioner, the presidents of the university system's four colleges and universities, and the chancellor.

== Members ==
This is a list of the trustees of the University System of New Hampshire, as of November 2023:.

=== Officers for 2023-2024 ===
- Alexander J. Walker-Chair
- James P. Burnett III—Vice Chair
- Kassandra Spanos Ardinger—Secretary

=== Ex officio members ===
- Chris Sununu—Governor of New Hampshire (2017- )
- James W. Dean Jr.—President, University of New Hampshire (2018- )
- Todd J. Leach—President, Granite State College (2010- )
- James Gray-designee for President of the Senate Chuck Morse (2021-)
- Donald L. Birx—President, Plymouth State University (2015- )
- Frank Edelblut—Commissioner of Education (2017-)
- Shawn N. Jasper—Commissioner of Agriculture, Markets, and Food (2015-)
- Rick Ladd - designee for Speaker of the House Sherman Packard (2021-)
- Melinda D. Treadwell- President, Keene State College

=== Alumni-elected members ===
- Kathy J. Green (2017-)
- Joel Nkounkou—UNH (2022-)
- Michael J. Pilot—UNH (2019-)
- J. Morgan Rutman—UNH (2016-)
- David A. Westover—KSC (2019)
- Wayne Semprini—PSU (2023-)

=== Student trustees ===
- Zachary J. Christie KSC USSB Representative
- Avery Ellis, UNH-Law USSB Representative
- Tim Hoheneder, UNH-Grad USSB Representative

=== Gubernatorial appointees ===
- Kassandra Spanos Ardinger (2016-)
- James P. Burnett III (2017-)
- M. Jaqueline Eastwood (2017-)
- Patrick W. Griffin (2023-)
- George S. Hansel (2019-)
- Kevin Knarr (2022-)
- Peter T. Paul (2022-)
- Gregg R. Tewksbury (2020-)
- Christiana Thornton (2022-)
- Alexander J. Walker, Jr. (2016-)
