= Sypher =

Sypher is a surname. Notable people with the surname include:

- J. Hale Sypher (1837–1905), American attorney and politician
- Lucy Johnston Sypher (1907–1990), American children's writer
- Marjorie Elliott Sypher (1925–2015), Canadian-born Costa Rican musician
- Wylie Sypher (1905–1987), American non-fiction writer and academic

== See also ==
- SypherPK (born 1996), American streamer and YouTuber
