= University of New Hampshire at Manchester =

Public university in Manchester, New Hampshire, US

Coordinates: 42°59′13″N 71°28′07″W

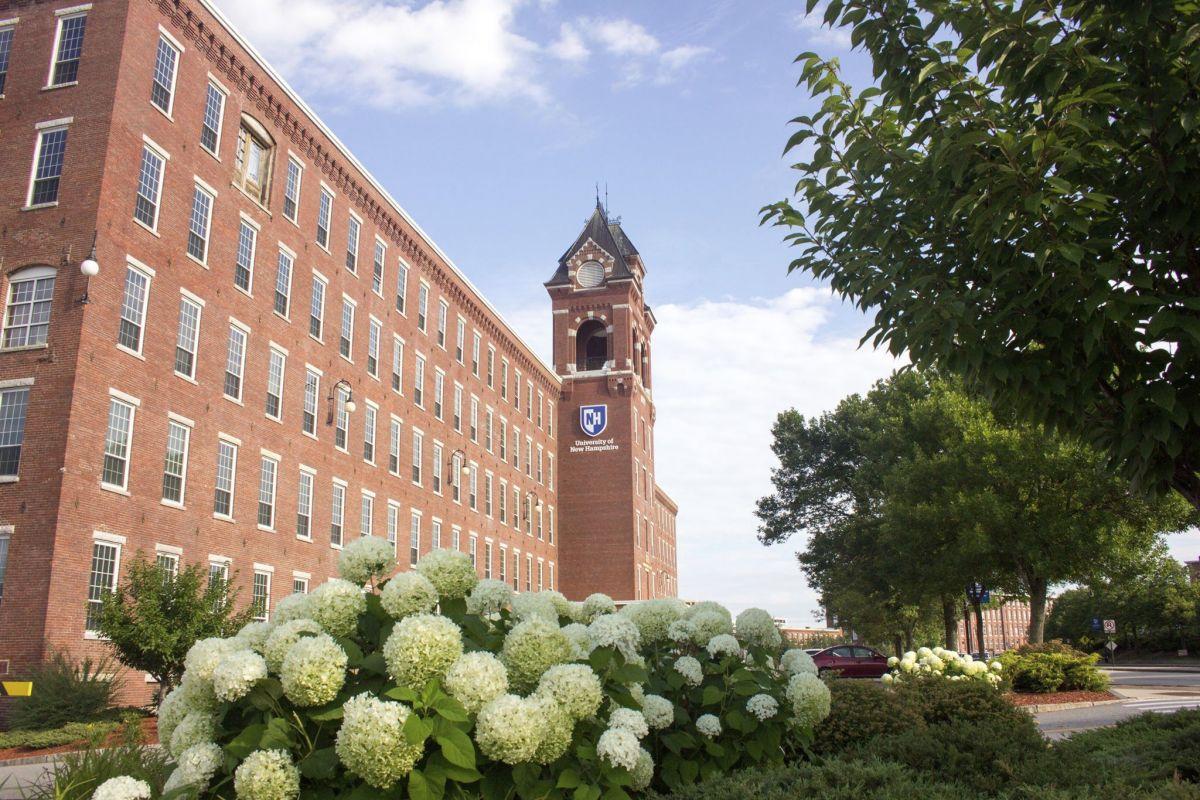
- Type: Satellite campus of University of New Hampshire
- Established: 1985
- Parent institution: University of New Hampshire
- President: Elizabeth S. Chilton
- Faculty: 64
- Administrative staff: 67
- Undergraduates: 759
- Postgraduates: 279
- Location: Manchester, New Hampshire, United States
- Campus: Urban 110,000 ft^{2} (10,220 m^{2})
- Colors: Blue and White
- Nickname: Wildcats
- Website: manchester.unh.edu

The University of New Hampshire at Manchester (UNH Manchester) is the urban campus of the University of New Hampshire College of Professional Studies. It was established in 1967 and is located in Manchester, New Hampshire.

The College of Professional Studies also includes an online program, which was formerly a separate institution called Granite State College.

== History ==
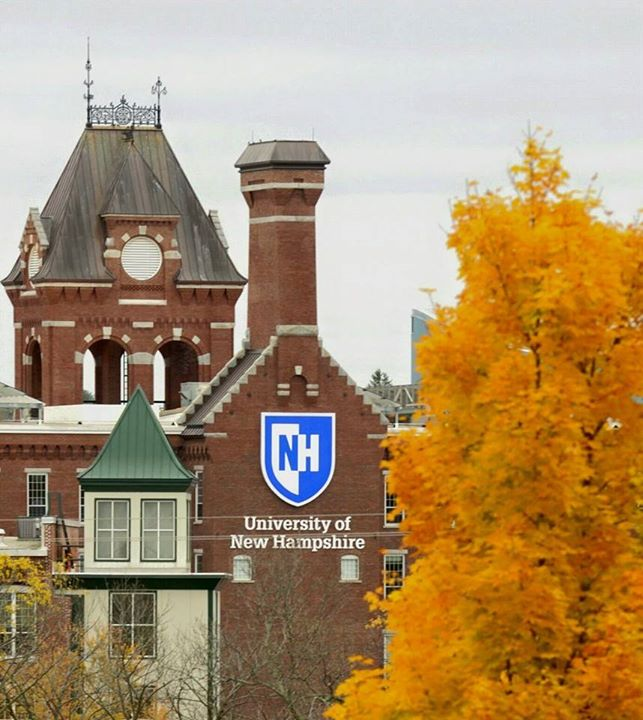
An October 2015 photograph of the Pandora Mill, main building of the University of New Hampshire campus in Manchester, New Hampshire

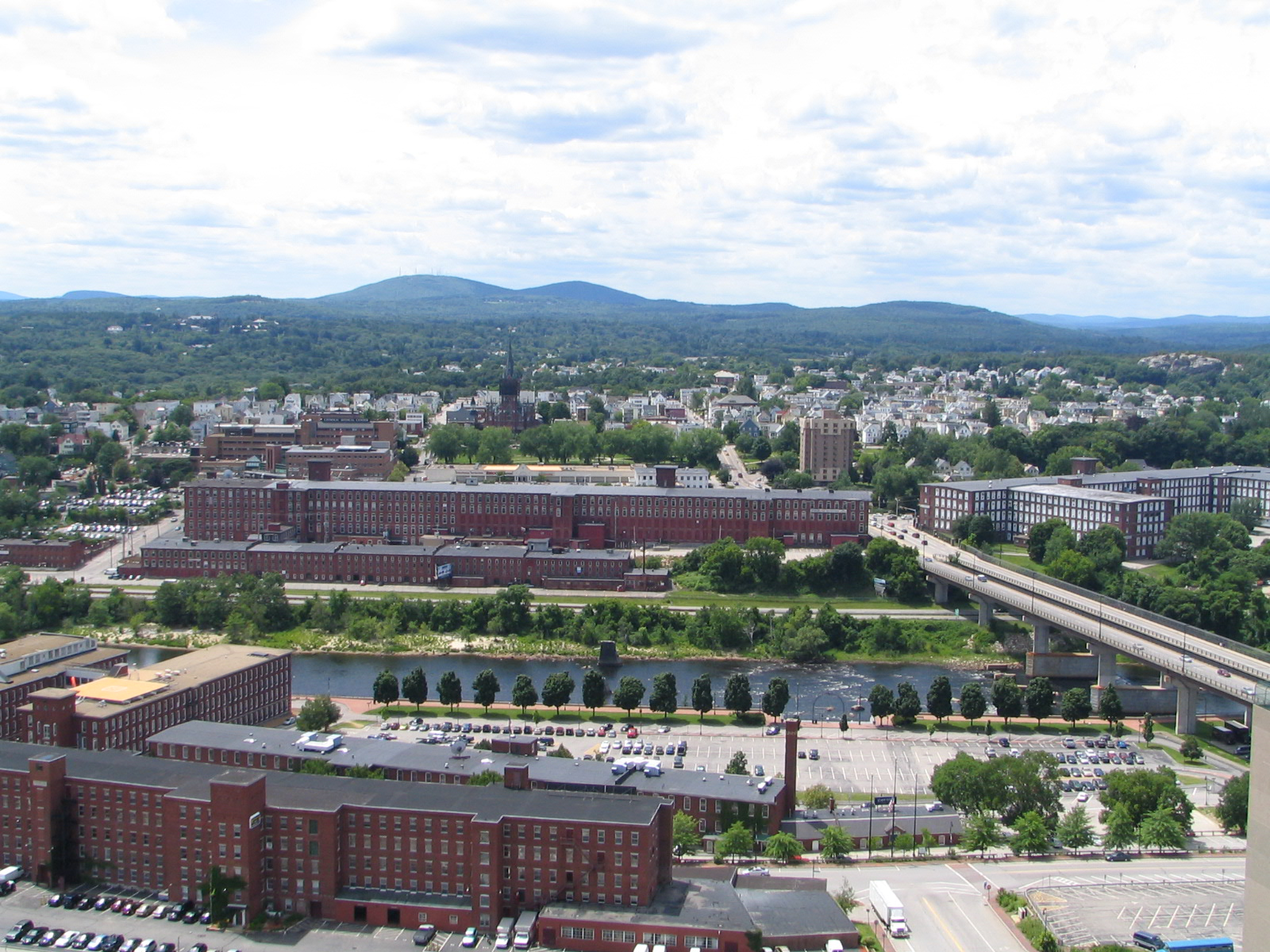
The north end of the Amoskeag Millyard, on the Merrimack River

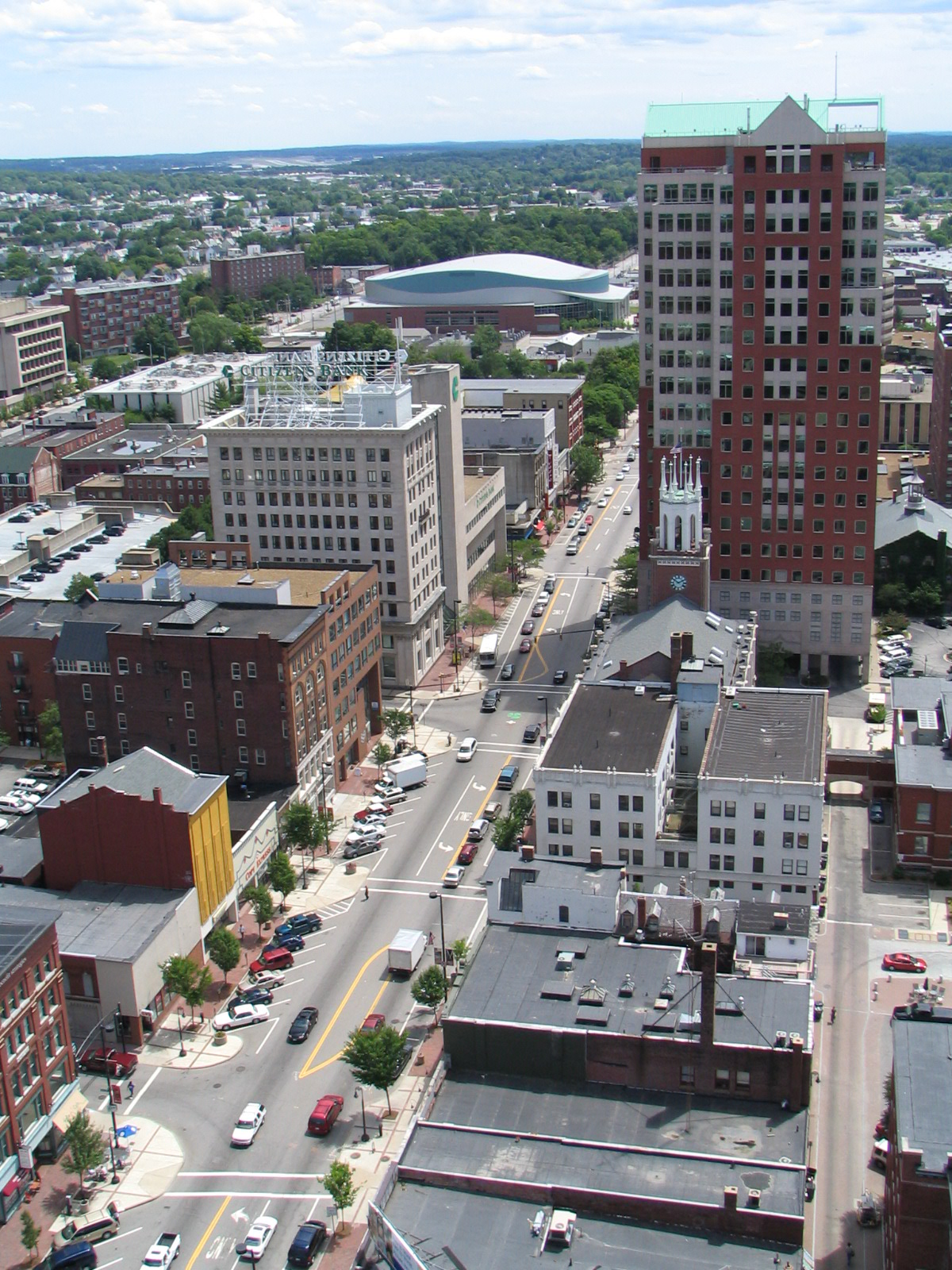
Downtown Manchester, looking south along Elm Street

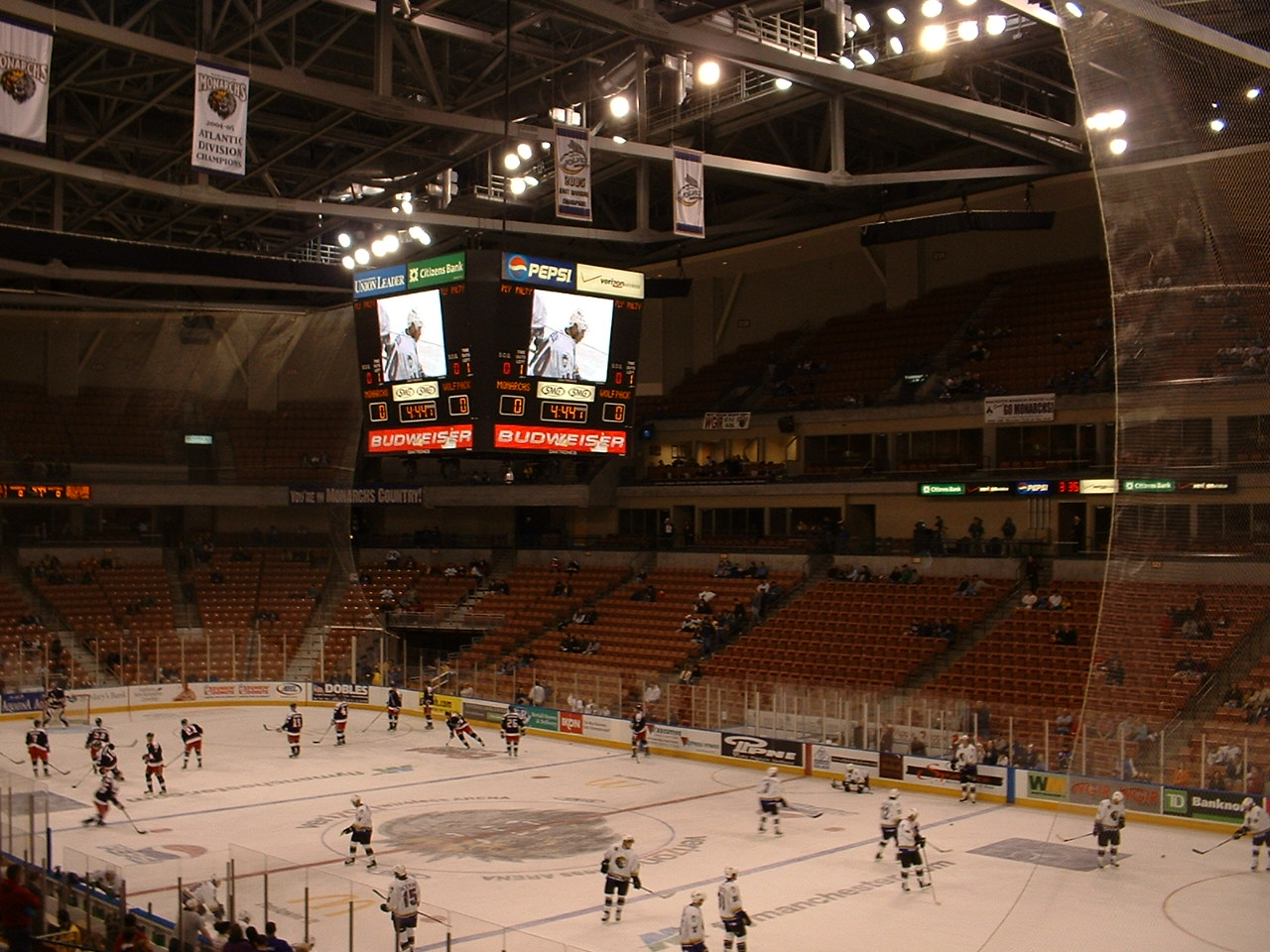
A view of the ice hockey surface at SNHU Arena

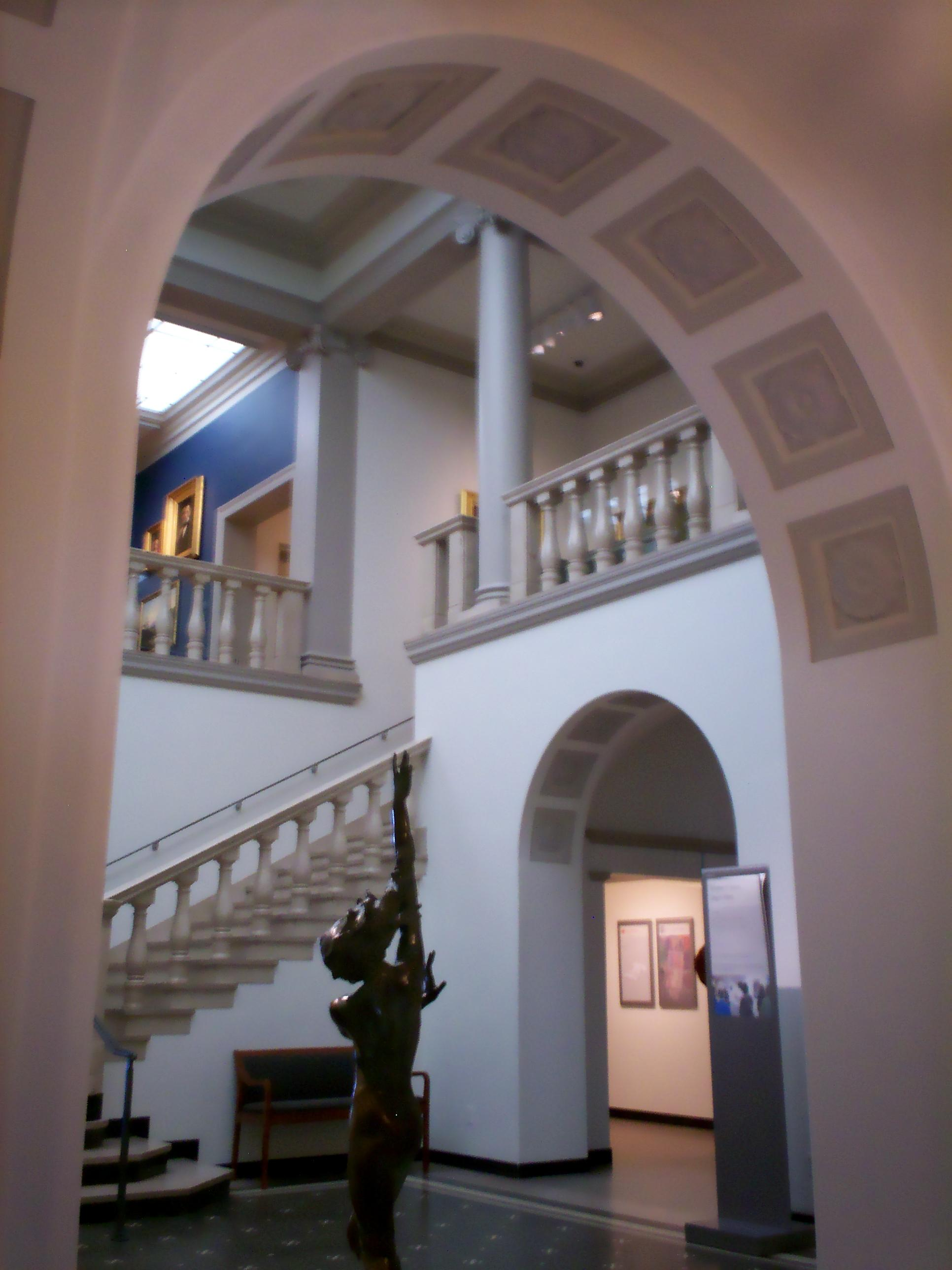
The main atrium of the Currier Museum of Art

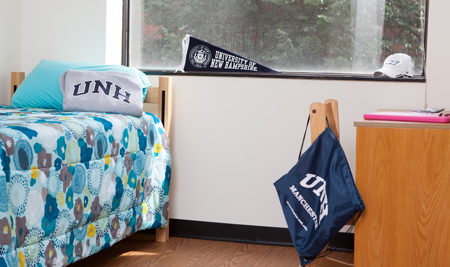
The UNHM dorms are located just off Elm Street, minutes from both the campus and downtown Manchester.

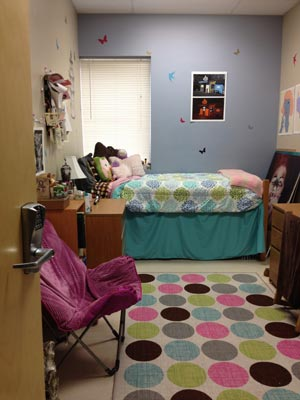
A typical dorm room at the University of New Hampshire in Manchester

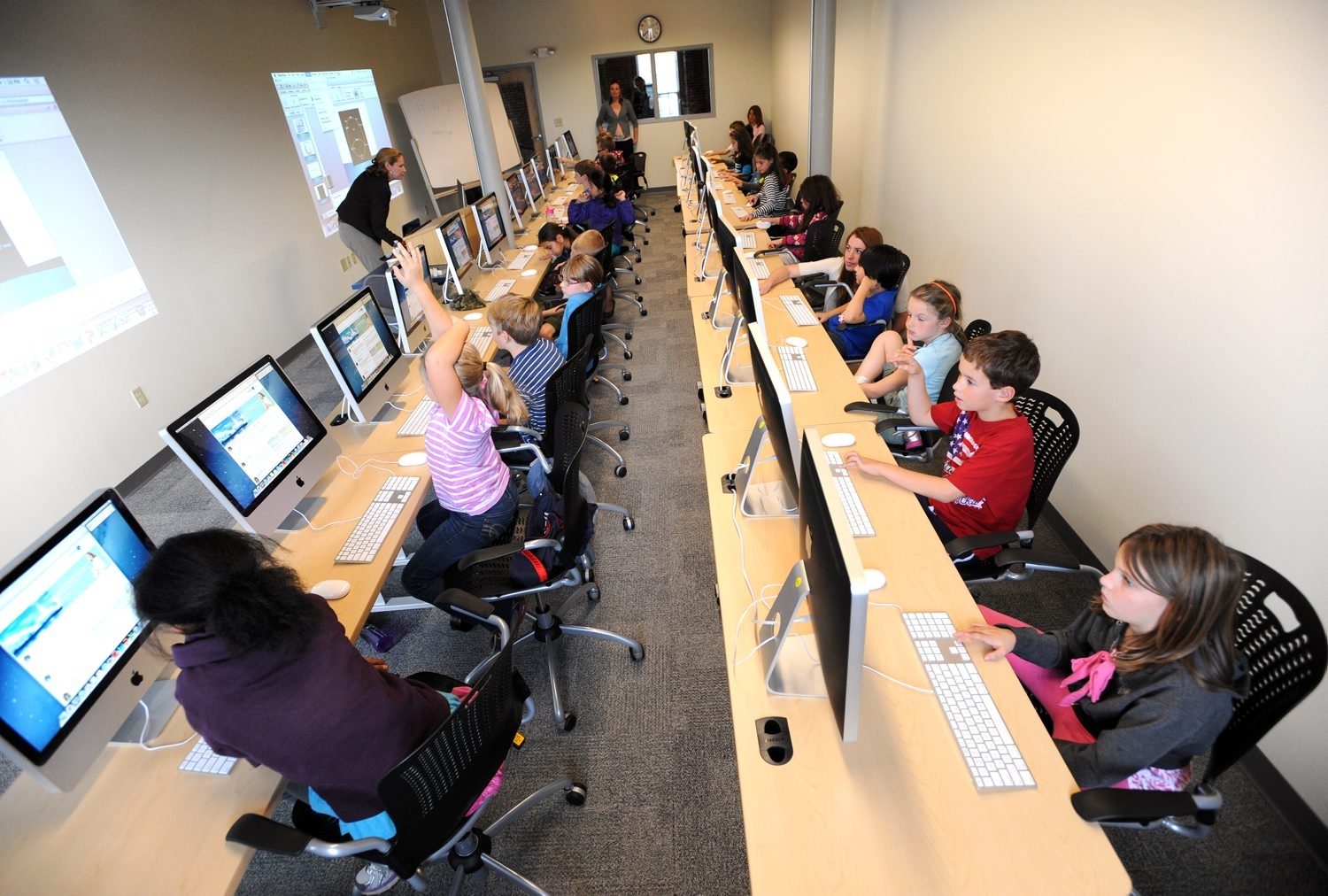
A view of the STEM Discovery Lab at the University of New Hampshire in Manchester

Merrimack Valley College began as a branch of the University of New Hampshire (UNH) in 1967. It became an independent institution within the University System of New Hampshire in 1977, remaining so until 1985 when it merged back into UNH as the University of New Hampshire at Manchester. The school initially offered continuing education programs, but these were transitioned to the separate School for Continuing Studies in 1978.

The college has been located in Manchester's historic Amoskeag Millyard since 2001, originally at a site on Commercial Street and, since 2015, at the Pandora Mills complex. That same year, Manchester was rated one of the "Five Coolest College Towns in New England" by Campus News. Other colleges in the area include Southern New Hampshire University, Saint Anselm College, Manchester Community College, and formerly the New Hampshire Institute of Art.

The School for Continuing Studies underwent several name changes since taking over UNH Manchester's continuing education programs in 1978. In 2005, after a failed effort to merge the school (then called the College for Lifelong Learning) into Plymouth State University, it was reorganized as Granite State College. Granite State College had several campuses around the state, but closed most of them as students shifted to online learning. Finally, in 2022, Granite State College merged into the University of New Hampshire as the online component of the UNH College of Professional Studies, while UNH Manchester became the college's on-campus component.

== Academics ==
The University of New Hampshire's urban campus provides associate, bachelor's, and master's degrees, with a special emphasis on programs that address urban issues and integrate undergraduate and graduate study with Manchester's thriving professional and business communities.

In addition to its wide range of academic and non-academic community outreach programs, the campus has a collaborative agreement with the neighboring New Hampshire Institute of Art that allows students interested in the fine arts to enroll in the Institute's Bachelor of Fine Arts program. The campus also has an articulation agreement with the Massachusetts College of Pharmacy and Health Sciences that allows students to dual enroll in the pre-pharmacy or physician assistant programs offered at the latter's Manchester location. UNHM has also established a partnership with the Institute at Palazzo Rucellai in Florence, Italy, which allows students in the former's Politics and Society program to study abroad. UNHM also provides valuable student resources, such as workshops and tutoring, through its Center for Academic Enrichment.

The student-faculty ratio at the university's urban campus is 13:1, and 97% of classes have fewer than 30 students. While the College has always attracted a significant cohort of non-traditional students, in recent years the demographics of the student body in Manchester have shifted considerably. In 2006, 59% of students were between the ages of 17 and 23, with 41% 24 or older; by 2013, only 34% of students were 24 or older, with 66% of the student body between the ages of 17 and 23.

=== STEM emphasis ===
Critical to the academic mission of the University of New Hampshire's campus in Manchester is emphasizing student learning in and out of the classroom, particularly in the STEM fields. A significant percentage of the 1,000 students studying at the urban campus secure for-credit internships in the Manchester business community, often in STEM-oriented companies, and the college in turn offers use of the UNH STEM Discovery Lab to members of the local community, particularly K-12 students and their teachers. UNHM Community Outreach Scholarship further serves the Manchester community by maintaining a massive data archive relating to the City of Manchester and its public policy initiatives. This archive is an official part of the UNH Dimond Library Digital Collections Initiative.

=== Study abroad programs ===
Students can take advantage of opportunities to study outside of the United States through UNH-managed programs such as the Florence Summer Program, UNH exchange programs, or UNH-approved programs. The National Student Exchange also allows a student to take a semester at a public college or university anywhere in the United States or its territories.

=== Rankings ===
Ordinarily, as a college of the University of New Hampshire, UNHM is not ranked by media outlets as a discrete institution. However, in 2013 Washington Monthly ranked UNH's urban college #14 in the United States in an assessment of best-value liberal arts colleges. In 2022, Money.com ranked UNH Manchester #204 out of all colleges and universities in the United States in an assessment of educational quality, affordability, and career outcomes. The undergraduate colleges of UNH located in Durham ranked #170 in the Money.com assessment.

In 2012, UNH Dining, which services the UNH colleges in both Manchester and Durham, was ranked in the top 50 nationally by The Daily Meal, whose "Best Colleges for Food in America" listing rates universities' dining options on accessibility, service, healthiness, sustainability, and use of local products.

== Student life ==
Undergraduate demographics as of Fall 2023
Race and ethnicity	Total
White	67%
Hispanic	10%
Unknown	8%
Asian	6%
Black	5%
Two or more races	4%
Economic diversity
Low-income (Note: The percentage of students who received an income-based federal Pell grant intended for low-income students.)	36%
Affluent (Note: The percentage of students who are a part of the American middle class at the bare minimum.)	64%

=== Housing ===
While many UNHM students commute to campus from towns in the greater Manchester area, UNH Manchester has housing available at the Hampton residence hall located at SNHU.

=== Activities ===
Students at UNHM participate in many student-led academic, recreational, and special-interest clubs.

=== Athletics ===
The University of New Hampshire's athletic program consists of 18 NCAA programs, all of which play at the Durham campus of the university. However, Manchester does on occasion host home games of the UNH men's ice hockey team. Games are occasionally held at SNHU Arena, a few blocks from the UNH Manchester campus, with a seating capacity of 11,770 (9,852 for ice hockey). SNHU Arena has also hosted other college and professional teams, such as the NCAA Frozen Four Tournament and the Manchester Monarchs hockey teams.

=== Publications ===
Millworks and Campus Connections tell the UNH Manchester story and connect students and other members of the UNHM community to the campus. Both publications are coordinated by the UNHM Marketing and Community Relations Office, and feature articles on student achievements, faculty research, and community partnerships.

=== Off-campus events ===
Manchester is home to the New Hampshire Fisher Cats, the Double-A affiliate of Major League Baseball's Toronto Blue Jays. The Fisher Cats play home games at Northeast Delta Dental Stadium, a 7,722-seat venue approximately a half-mile from UNH Manchester. Other local attractions include the historic Palace Theater, the Currier Museum of Art, the New Hampshire Institute of Art, and the SEE Science Center, an interactive learning facility adjacent to the UNH Manchester campus.

=== Public programs ===
The University of New Hampshire's Manchester campus connects the research and knowledge of students, faculty, and staff with the local community through public programs and events. The UNHM Speaker's Bureau runs a lecture series that pairs researchers at UNHM with academic partners like middle schools, high schools, and community colleges. Through the Bureau, campus faculty and students share, free of charge, their disciplinary expertise and research experience in the STEM fields, the social sciences, and the humanities. In addition, the campus sponsors films, book clubs, brown-bag luncheon lectures, the Sidore lecture series, and Music in the Mills (an initiative supported by the Frederick Smyth Foundation) to provide those living in and around Manchester with an opportunity to learn and discover.
