= Lasell University =

Private university in Newton, Massachusetts, US

- Former name: List: Auburndale Female Seminary (1851–1852); Lasell Female Seminary (1852–1874); Lasell Seminary for Young Women (1874–1932); Lasell Junior College (1932–1989); Lasell College (1989–2019); Lasell University (2019–present)
- Motto: Repulsae Nescia
- Motto in English: Ignorant of Defeat
- Type: Private university
- Established: 1851; 175 years ago
- Endowment: $46.1 million (2025)
- President: Eric Turner
- Students: 1,454 (fall 2025)
- Undergraduates: 1,123
- Postgraduates: 331
- Location: Newton, Massachusetts, United States; 42.3413°N 71.2434°W
- Campus: Suburban, 54 acres (218,530.2 m^{2})
- Colors: Dark and light blue
- Nickname: Lasers
- Sporting affiliations: NCAA Division III (ECAC, GNAC)
- Mascot: Boomer the Torchbearer
- Website: lasell.edu
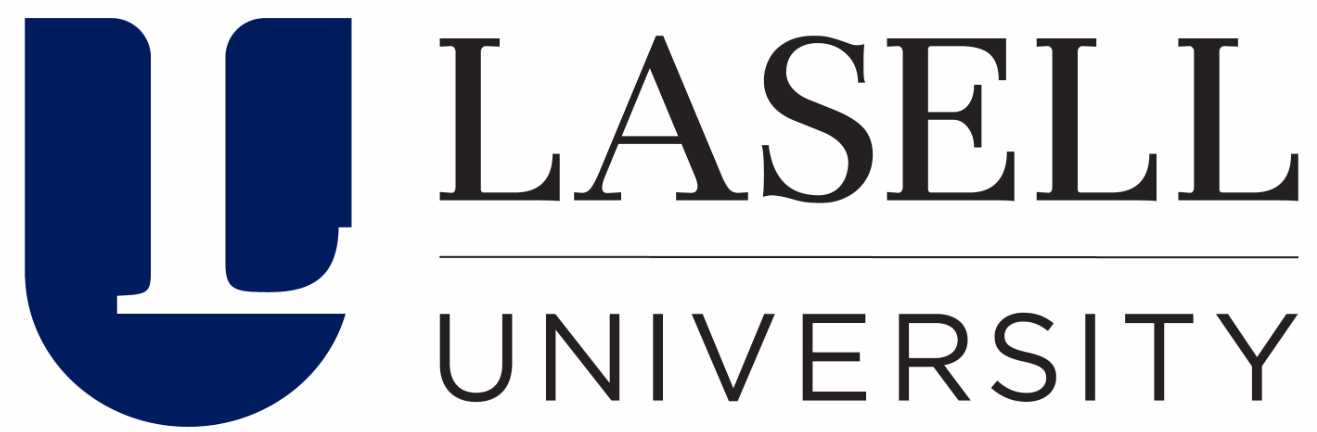

Lasell University (LU) is a private university in Newton, Massachusetts, United States. It was founded by Edward Lasell in 1851 as a women's seminary. It became a college in 1932, a four-year institution in 1989, coeducational in 1997, and a university proper in 2019. The campus spans 54 acres and is located in the village of Auburndale.

Lasell offers bachelor's, master's, and graduate degrees in several disciplines. The university participates in NCAA Division III athletics, as well as having a student newspaper, a student yearbook, and a student-run radio station.

== History ==
Lasell was founded in 1851 as the "Auburndale Female Seminary" by Edward Lasell, after he took a sabbatical year from his job as Professor of Chemistry in Williams College Williamstown to teach at the Mount Holyoke Female Seminary in South Hadley, where the experience inspired him to invest more personally in women's education. He died of typhoid fever during the first semester, but his school proved highly successful as a first-rate educational institution and was soon renamed "Lasell Female Seminary" in his memory.

Its name later changed to "Lasell Seminary for Young Women", and in 1874, governance was given to a board of trustees and Principal Charles C. Bragdon. Bragdon further expanded the faculty to make Lasell renowned as a more academically rigorous institution, a prestigious school with a highly scientific approach to domestic work, art, and music. As an innovative institution, known for a radical approach to women's education at the time, Lasell also administered the Harvard exams and offered law courses for women.

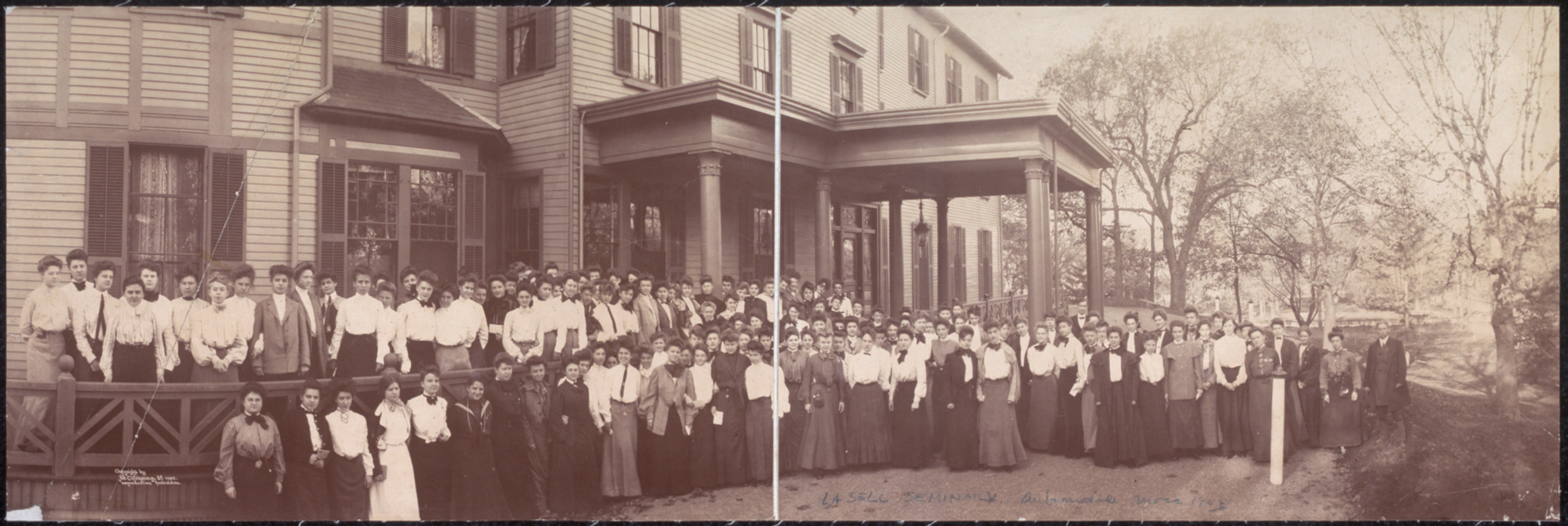
Lasell seminary in 1903

Lasell also offered two years of standard collegiate instruction as early as 1852 and is cited as having been the "first successful and persistent" junior college in the United States. In 1932, the college changed its name to "Lasell Junior College", and the school officially began offering associate degrees in 1943. In 1989, Lasell adopted a charter to become a four-year institution (it no longer offers any two-year undergraduate degrees), and began admitting male students in 1997. Lasell also began offering master's degrees in 2002.

Lasell faced controversy in 2000 when seven former students sued and claimed that the nursing program, which had been discontinued in 1999, had been a "sham." The following year, the college built Lasell Village, an elderly education facility in which residents paid to live and attend classes. Although the college argued that the property was in line with its non-profit mission and exempt from property taxes, the city successfully sued the college for not paying property taxes for the property.

In September 2010, a settlement was also filed in Suffolk Superior Court stipulating that Lasell would have to pay $191,314 to over 1,000 students over a conflict of interest in their Financial Aid Department. The investigation was done by the office of Attorney General Martha Coakley.

The college explored merging with Mount Ida College, another liberal arts institution located in Newton, in February 2018. The reasons given for the proposed merger were to help keep tuition cost as low as possible and maintaining academic quality.

In 2019, the institution's application to become a university was approved by the state board of education and it changed its name to Lasell University.

== Academics ==
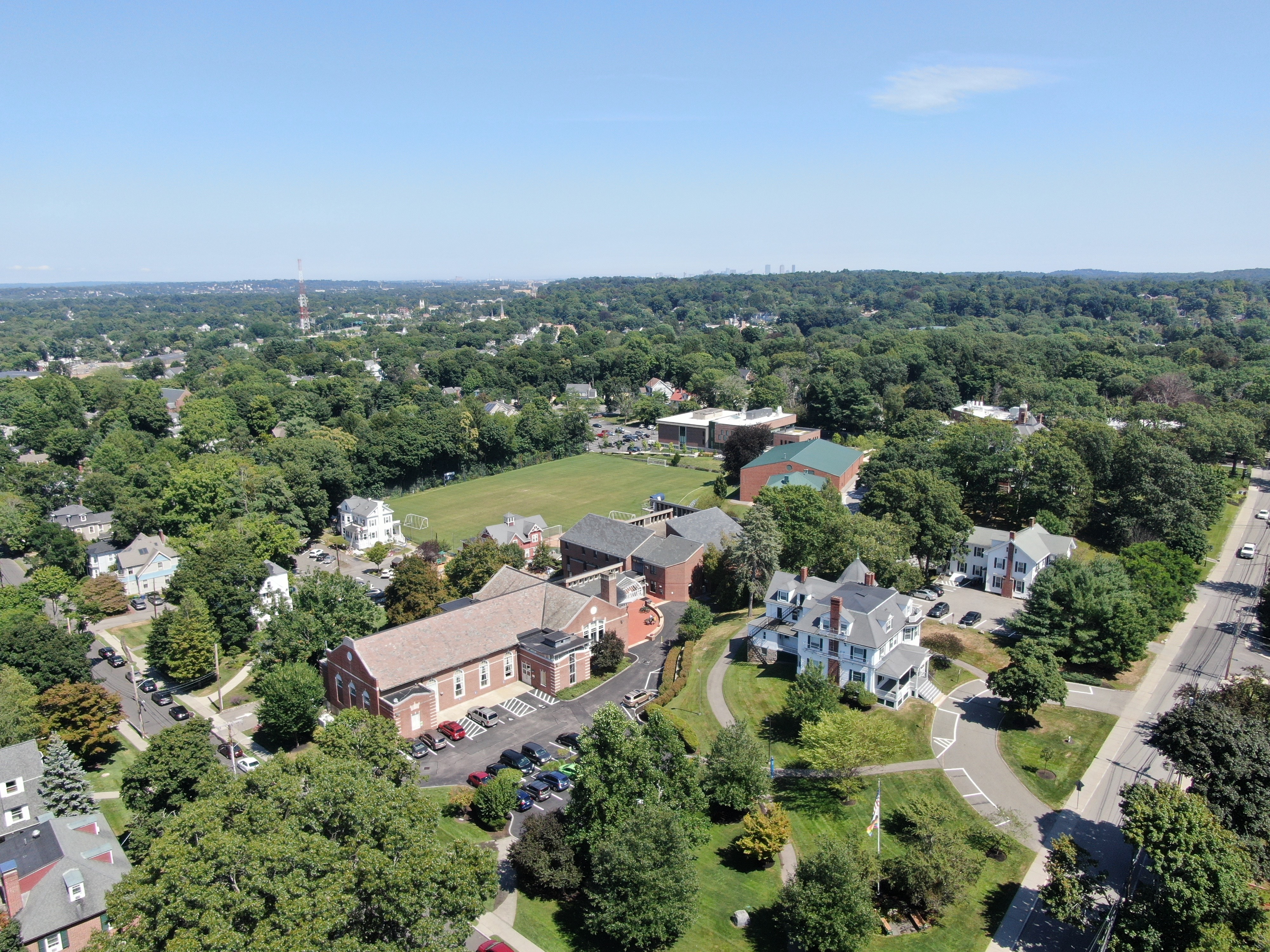
Lasell University campus

Lasell has been accredited by multiple agencies, including the New England Commission of Higher Education, and offers bachelor's degrees in the liberal arts and professional disciplines. Through its "Connected Learning" program, students work on off-site projects and assignments. Lasell also offers graduate degrees in education, communication, sport management, athletic training, criminal justice, human resources, marketing, management (MS and MBA), and rehabilitation science.

In 2018, U.S. News & World Report listed Lasell College among only five other colleges with having 100 percent of its graduating seniors participate in an internship experience.

=== Master of Science in Criminal Justice Program Recognition ===
In February of 2024, U.S. News & World Report named Lasell University's Master of Science in Criminal Justice Program one of its 2024 Best Online Programs.

=== Solstice Low-Residency MFA Program ===
In 2022, Lasell acquired the Solstice Low-Residency MFA Program from Pine Manor College, where it had been hosted since 2006. Solstice is four-semester Master of Fine Arts program in creative writing. In the low-residency format, students complete five 10-day, on-campus residencies and four semesters in which they work with their faculty mentors remotely from their homes. Residencies occur in January and July and start the spring and fall semesters, respectively. Solstice students may concentrate in fiction, creative nonfiction, poetry, comics & graphic narratives, or writing for children and young adults.

== Campus ==
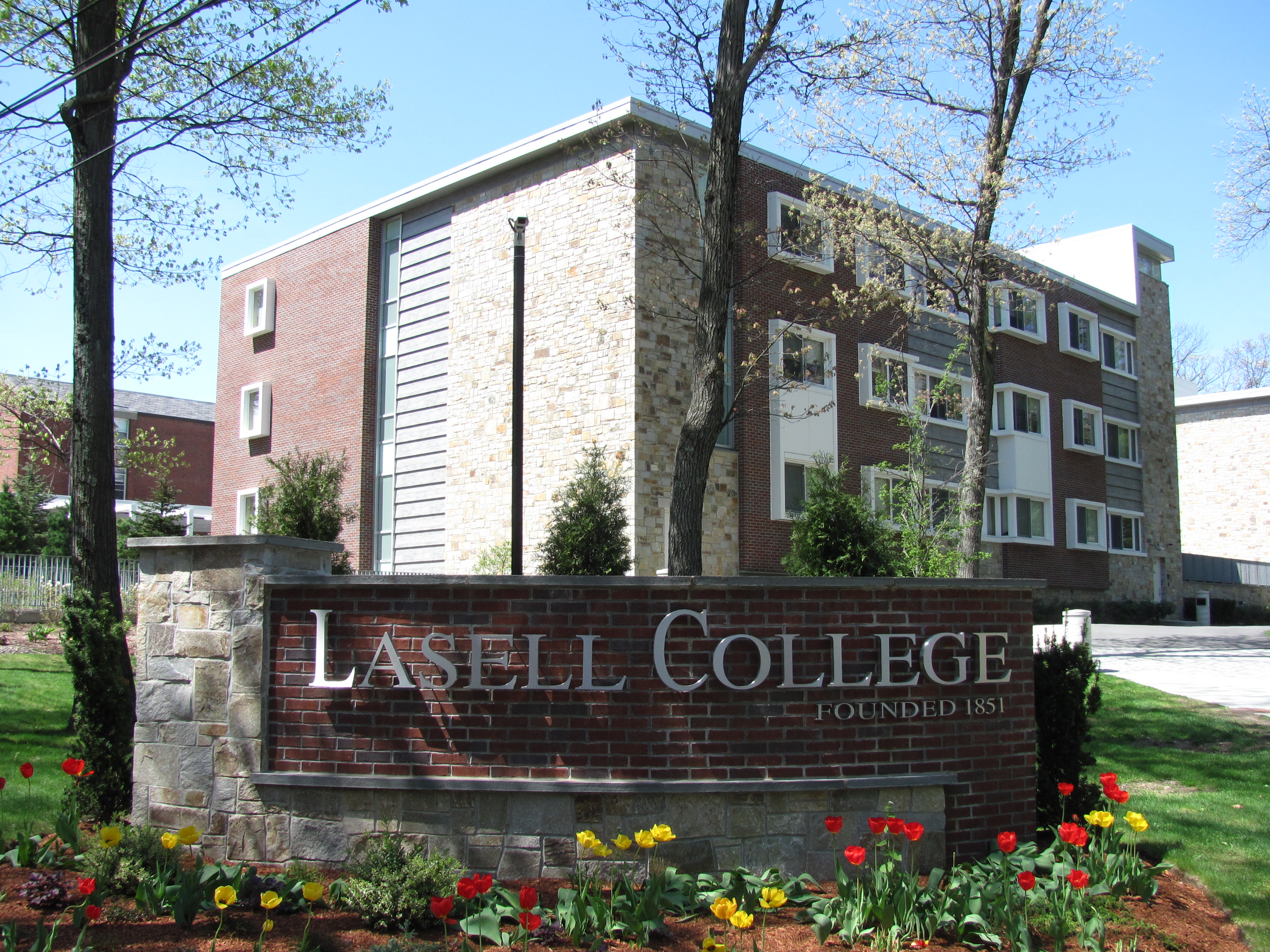
Lasell University building and sign

The Lasell campus covers roughly 54 acres (22 ha) in the Newton, Massachusetts, village of Auburndale, adjacent to the Lasell Neighborhood Historic District. There are approximately 58 buildings, 27 of which are student dormitories. The campus is roughly bounded by Grove St to the west, the Woodland Golf Club to the south, Washington St (Route 16) to the east, and Commonwealth Avenue (Route 30) and Central St to the north. Woodland Rd cuts east-west through the middle.

The campus is located about half a mile from the Auburndale Commuter Rail station on the Framingham/Worcester Line, and about one mile away from the Riverside MBTA Station on the Green Line's D train, which takes commuters into the downtown Boston area. A shuttle runs regularly between the campus and Riverside Station.

== Student life ==
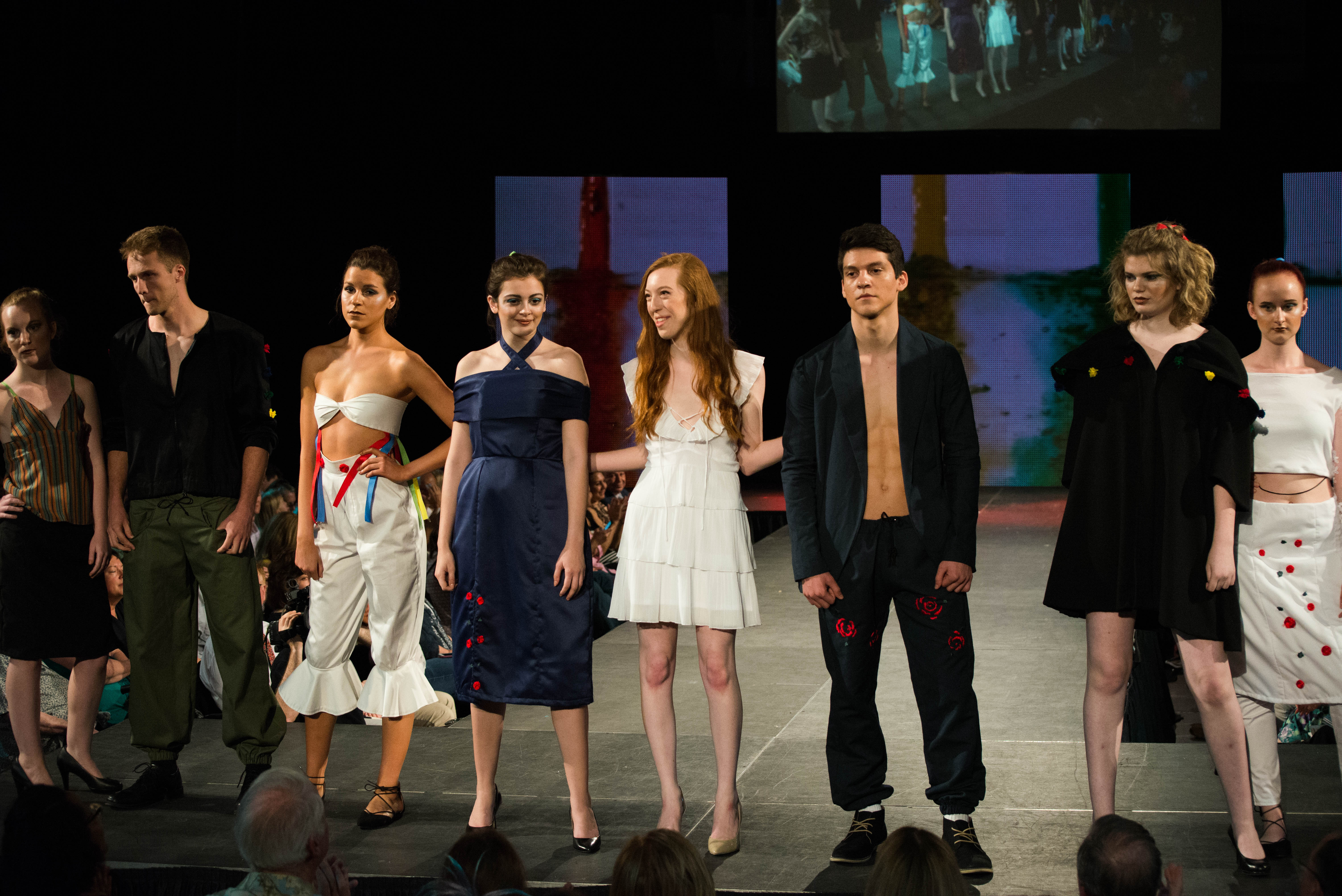
Lasell University spring fashion show

In 2018, of the 1,650 undergraduate students who attended Lasell, 73% lived on campus, 40% came from out-of-state, and 22% were students of color. Roughly 36% of students at Lasell were male.

In Fall 2023, Lasell had 1,152 undergraduate students and 389 graduate students. The majority of both groups were white (63.28% of undergraduates, and 46.27% of graduates).

The majority of both groups were also from in-state (62.2% and 63.9%, respectively). About 65% of Lasell's student population was female, and 34% male; the remainder were transgender/non-binary.

=== Athletics ===
Lasell athletics mark

Lasell athletics teams are nicknamed the Lasers. The university is a member of the National Collegiate Athletic Association's Division III. The Lasell Lasers compete as members of the Eastern College Athletic Conference and the Great Northeast Athletic Conference in baseball, basketball, volleyball, soccer, cross-country, field hockey, softball, lacrosse, and track and field as intercollegiate varsity sports.

On March 27, 2026, assistant vice president of athletics and de facto athletic director Jamie Marcoux announced that men's and women's varsity golf programs would be added, beginning with the fall 2026 NCAA Division III golf season. The men's team will compete in the GNAC, which sponsors men's golf for all but four other non-competing members (Colby-Sawyer, Regis, Rivier, and Saint Joseph's of Maine), while the women's team will initially compete as a Division III independent, as the GNAC does not sponsor women's golf as a conference.

In 2009, a mascot was introduced: Boomer the Torchbearer, named for the industrialists who sponsored Lasell's founding. Among the school's club sports, women's and men's rugby are popular. There are intramural sports such as flag football in the fall, as well as basketball in the winter.

=== Organizations ===
The student newspaper is called the 1851 Chronicle in reference to Lasell's founding year, and the student yearbook is called the Lamp. Polished Magazine is made by Lasell students. A student-run online college radio station began operation in the fall of 2004; in 2016, the radio station began broadcasting on FM as WLAS-LP (102.9).

== Notable people ==
=== Alumni ===
- Micah Aiu – politician, member of the Hawaii House of Representatives
- Annie Montague Alexander – explorer, naturalist, paleontological collector, philanthropist
- Martha Atwood – operatic soprano
- Sarah Lord Bailey – elocutionist and teacher
- Ada Langworthy Collier – poet, writer
- Nancy Donahue – fashion model
- Elizabeth Jane Gardner – American painter
- Louisa Venable Kyle – historian, author, journalist
- Annie Bartlett Shepard – anti-women's suffrage activist and founder of the Derry, NH chapter of the Daughters of the American Revolution (DAR)
- Helen Augusta Whittier – editor, lecturer, teacher, businesswoman

=== Faculty ===
- James Anderson – government defense official and academic
- Anna Barrows – pioneering woman in the field of home economics
- Todd J. Leach – president of Granite State College, began his academic career at Lasell
- Mary Johnson Bailey Lincoln – considered one of the pioneers of the domestic science movement in the United States, taught at Lasell from 1885 to 1889
- Florence Jepperson Madsen – contralto singer, vocal instructor, and professor of music
- George McKendree Steele – educator and Methodist minister, former president of Lawrence University
- Lucy Johnston Sypher – children's book author
