= Todd J. Leach =

President of Granite State College

Todd J. Leach

Todd J. Leach is an American administrator who is the Chancellor of the University System of New Hampshire, which consists of University of New Hampshire, Plymouth State University, Keene State College, and Granite State College. Leach was formerly president of Granite State College. He is a member of the USNH Board of Trustees and a commissioner for the State of New Hampshire Post-Secondary Education Commission. He previously was chair of the New England Board of Higher Education, the NH College and University Council, Campus Compact NH, and the NH Higher Education Commission.

== Early life and education ==
Leach graduated from Mass Bay Community College with an associate degree. He graduated from Worcester State College with a Bachelor of Science in 1983. Leach then attended Bentley University, where he earned his Master of Business Administration degree. He earned his PhD from Northeastern University.

== Career ==
Leach began his academic career as an associate professor at Lasell College from 1986 until 1996, where he was the director of business programs and the director of the Yamawaki Program. He was chair of the faculty, chair of the curriculum committee, and Faculty Marshal.

Leach worked at Northeastern University as Senior Associate Dean and Chief Academic Officer of the College of Professional Studies. Leach oversaw Northeastern Online and was the Executive Director of Northeastern University's School of Education.

Leach became the fourth president of Granite State College on July 1, 2010. He has overseen the development of Granite State College's first master's degree programs. and the creation of the Office of Graduate Studies.

== Awards and achievements ==
- Distinguished Alumni Award, Worcester State College, 2012
