= Wales, North Dakota =

- City
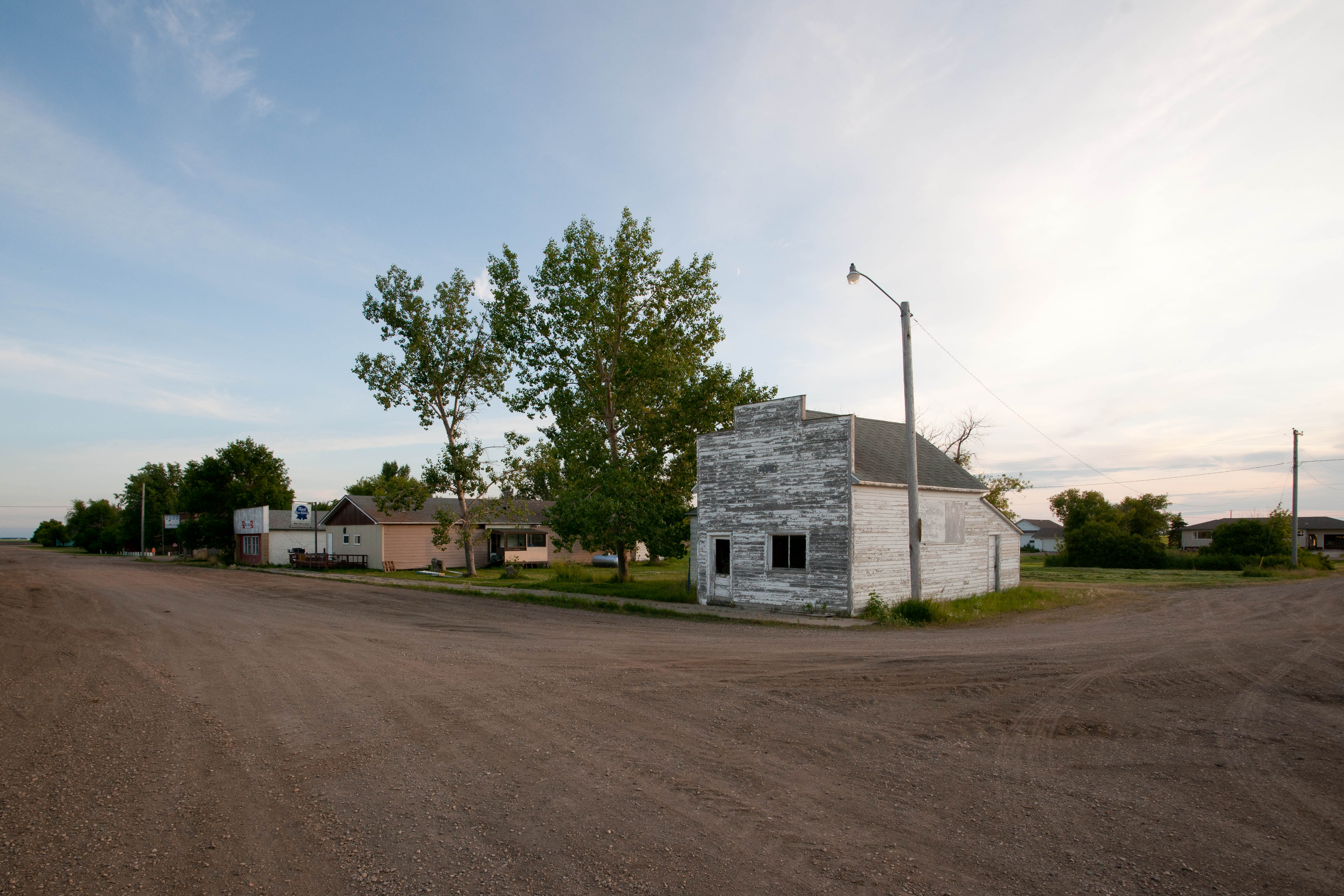
- Street in Wales

- Location of Wales, North Dakota
- Coordinates: 48°53′43″N 98°36′03″W
- Country: United States
- State: North Dakota
- County: Cavalier
- Founded: 1897

Area
  - Total: 0.246 sq mi (0.637 km^{2})
  - Land: 0.242 sq mi (0.626 km^{2})
  - Water: 0.0039 sq mi (0.010 km^{2})
- Elevation: 1,568 ft (478 m)

Population (2020)
  - Total: 10
  - Estimate (2024): 9
  - Density: 41.4/sq mi (15.97/km^{2})
- Time zone: UTC–6 (Central (CST))
  - Summer (DST): UTC–5 (CDT)
- ZIP Code: 58281
- Area code: 701
- FIPS code: 38-82940
- GNIS feature ID: 1036313

Wales is a city in Cavalier County, North Dakota, United States. The population was 10 at the 2020 census. Wales was founded in 1897. Gavilon is Wales' largest employer.

== Geography ==
According to the United States Census Bureau, the city has a total area of 0.246 square miles (0.64 km^{2}), of which 0.242 square miles (0.63 km^{2}) is land and 0.004 square miles (0.01 km^{2}) is water.

== Demographics ==
Historical population
Census	Pop.	Note	%±
1950	235		—
1960	151		−35.7%
1970	116		−23.2%
1980	74		−36.2%
1990	48		−35.1%
2000	30		−37.5%
2010	31		3.3%
2020	10		−67.7%
2024 (est.)	9		−10.0%
U.S. Decennial Census; 2020 Census

=== 2010 census ===
As of the 2010 census, there were 31 people, 13 households, and 10 families residing in the city. The population density was 134.8 inhabitants per square mile (52.0/km^{2}). There were 20 housing units at an average density of 87.0 per square mile (33.6/km^{2}). The racial makeup of the city was 90.3% White, 3.2% from other races, and 6.5% from two or more races.

There were 13 households, of which 23.1% had children under the age of 18 living with them, 69.2% were married couples living together, 7.7% had a male householder with no wife present, and 23.1% were non-families. 23.1% of all households were made up of individuals, and 23.1% had someone living alone who was 65 years of age or older. The average household size was 2.38 and the average family size was 2.80.

The median age in the city was 59.5 years. 25.8% of residents were under the age of 18; 0% were between the ages of 18 and 24; 16.2% were from 25 to 44; 12.9% were from 45 to 64; and 45.2% were 65 years of age or older. The gender makeup of the city was 51.6% male and 48.4% female.

=== 2000 census ===
As of the 2000 census, there were 30 people, 18 households, and 7 families residing in the city. The population density was 127.3 inhabitants per square mile (49.2/km^{2}). There were 31 housing units at an average density of 131.5 per square mile (50.8/km^{2}). The racial makeup of the city was 100.00% White.

There were 18 households, out of which 5.6% had children under the age of 18 living with them, 33.3% were married couples living together, 5.6% had a female householder with no husband present, and 61.1% were non-families. 50.0% of all households were made up of individuals, and 22.2% had someone living alone who was 65 years of age or older. The average household size was 1.67 and the average family size was 2.43.

In the city, the population was spread out, with 6.7% under the age of 18, 10.0% from 18 to 24, 13.3% from 25 to 44, 30.0% from 45 to 64, and 40.0% who were 65 years of age or older. The median age was 56 years. For every 100 females, there were 150.0 males. For every 100 females age 18 and over, there were 154.5 males.

The median income for a household in the city was $15,000, and the median income for a family was $30,000. Males had a median income of $26,250 versus $0 for females. The per capita income for the city was $11,986. There were no families and 28.6% of the population living below the poverty line, including no under eighteens and 60.0% of those over 64.

== Notable person ==
- Lucy Johnston Sypher, author of The Edge of Nowhere series, stories based in Wales.
