= Elizabeth S. Chilton =

American academic

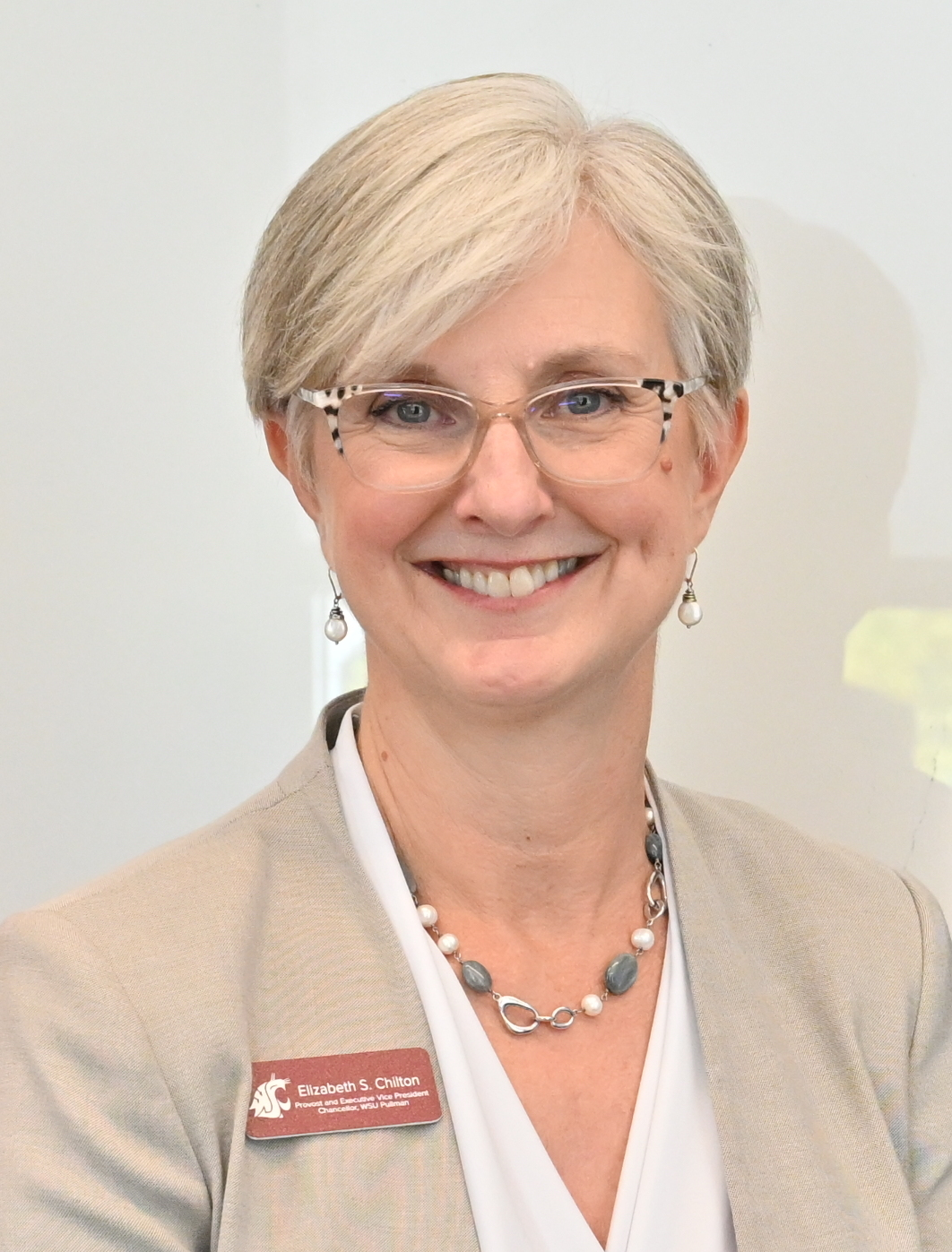
- Chilton in 2023

21st President of the University of New Hampshire
- Incumbent
- Assumed office July 1, 2024
- Preceded by: James W. Dean Jr.

1st Chancellor of Washington State University (Pullman)
- In office January 2022 – June 30, 2024
- Succeeded by: David Cillay (interim)

Provost and Executive Vice President of Washington State University (System)
- In office August 1, 2020 – June 30, 2024
- Preceded by: Mitzi Montoya; Bryan Slinker (interim)
- Succeeded by: T. Chris Riley-Tillman

Personal details
- Born: Elizabeth Susan Chilton
- Education: University at Albany, SUNY (BA); University of Massachusetts Amherst (MA, PhD)
- Scientific career
- Fields: Anthropology
- Workplaces: State University of New York at Oneonta; Skidmore College; Harvard University; University of Massachusetts Amherst; Binghamton University; Washington State University (Pullman); University of New Hampshire
- Thesis: Embodiments of choice: Native American ceramic diversity in the New England interior (1996)
- Doctoral advisor: Dena Dincauze

Elizabeth Susan Chilton is an American educator who has been the 21st president of the University of New Hampshire since 2024. Prior, she was the inaugural Chancellor of Washington State University on the Pullman, Washington campus. A trained anthropologist, Chilton specializes in the pre-colonial archaeology of Northeast North America, as well as paleoecology, cultural resource management, heritage studies and materials science. She is the author of dozens of peer-reviewed book chapters and journal articles. She previously served as provost and executive Vice President of the Washington State University system, as Dean of the Harpur College of Arts and Sciences at Binghamton University, and as Associate Vice Chancellor for research and engagement at the University of Massachusetts Amherst.

== Education and career ==
Chilton is a first-generation college student. She has a B.A. in anthropology, magna cum laude with departmental honors and a minor in mathematics from the University at Albany, SUNY (1985). Chilton received her M.A. (1991) and her Ph.D. (1996), both in anthropology, from the University of Massachusetts Amherst. Following her Ph.D. Chilton held academic positions at Skidmore College and Harvard University before joining the University of Massachusetts Amherst in 2001 where she was promoted to professor in 2010. In August 2012, Chilton was named associate dean for research and programs. Her final role at University of Massachusetts Amherst came as associate vice chancellor for research and engagement, before her departure for Binghamton University in 2017 where she served as the dean of Harpur College of Arts and Sciences

From 2011 to 2016 Chilton was co-editor of the journal Heritage & Society. From 2019 to 2021 Chilton was president of the Archaeology Division of the American Anthropological Association.

In 2020 Chilton was named provost and executive vice president of Washington State University, and in 2021 she was named the inaugural chancellor of the Pullman, Washington campus of Washington State.

In May 2024, Chilton was named as the next president of the University of New Hampshire. She began her new role on July 1, 2024.

Despite having played a role in the foundation of her graduate employee labor union during her own graduate studies, Chilton has, since her appointment and through 2026, switched to playing an adversarial role in the negotiation process for the ratification of the graduate employee union at the University of New Hampshire.

== Research ==
Her research interests are focused on New England archaeology and Native American Studies. While at the University of Massachusetts, Chilton founded and led the director of the Center for Heritage and Society, which established a multidisciplinary community that aimed to preserve items of cultural heritage. She has also spoken on the value of archaeological sites in the Narragansett Bay area. She has conducted field research on the island of Martha's Vineyard where she examined the past Wampanoag activities in a portion of the island.

== Selected publications ==
- Chilton, Elizabeth S.; Rainey, Mary Lynne (2010). Nantucket and other natives places: the legacy of Elizabeth Alden Little. Albany: SUNY. ISBN 978-1-4384-3254-0.
- Chilton, Elizabeth S. "The Certain Benefits of Cluster Hiring". Inside Higher Ed.
- Brabec, Elizabeth; Chilton, Elizabeth (2015). "Toward an Ecology of Cultural Heritage". Change over Time. 5 (2): 266–285. doi:10.1353/cot.2015.0021. ISSN 2153-0548. S2CID 59437288.
