= Mark Huddleston =

American academic administrator (born 1950)

19th President of the University of New Hampshire
- In office 2007–2018
- Preceded by: Ann Weaver Hart
- Succeeded by: James W. Dean Jr.

President of Ohio Wesleyan University
- In office 2004–2007

Personal details
- Education: University at Buffalo (B.A.); University of Wisconsin–Madison (M.A., Ph.D.)

Mark W. Huddleston was the 19th president of the University of New Hampshire (UNH), having been elected to that position on April 18, 2007.

== Biography ==
Huddleston received his bachelor's degree in political science from the University at Buffalo, The State University of New York in 1972. He earned his master's and doctoral degrees in political science from the University of Wisconsin–Madison in 1973 and 1978 respectively. He has worked extensively in Bosnia and Kazakhstan for USAID and the Organization for Security and Co-operation in Europe in Europe. He also has managed programs for the United States Information Agency in Slovenia, Mexico, Botswana, South Africa, and Zimbabwe. He has published several articles on consensus building in higher education, and several books on the American civil service. Huddleston took up the position at UNH after stepping away from his post as the 15th president of Ohio Wesleyan University.

Huddleston specializes in public administration, a field in which he has published widely, focusing on the senior federal career service and a variety of international issues. Before going to Ohio Wesleyan, Huddleston served in the faculty of the University of Delaware for 24 years, ultimately as the dean of the college of arts and sciences. Huddleston has been an active consultant for both the U.S. government and international organizations in the past. He worked previously in the Balkans, southern Africa, and central and southeast Asia. He gained international development experience in Bosnia as an advisor on rebuilding financial and administrative infrastructures following the Dayton Accords. Prior to assuming his current position, Huddleston served as the president of Ohio Wesleyan University, located in Delaware, Ohio, from 2004 to 2007.

Huddleston was the highest-paid public employee in the state of New Hampshire in 2016, with a salary of $492,800. Huddleston earned $385,000 in base pay during the 2013-14 year — plus an additional $94,710 in bonus pay, his total compensation was $479,710.

On May 3, 2017, the university announced that Huddleston would retire from his position at the end of the 2017-2018 school year. It was announced in the spring of 2018 that James W. Dean Jr. would succeed Huddleston as President, having previously served as executive vice chancellor and provost at University of North Carolina at Chapel Hill, where he is also a professor of organizational behavior.

== Bibliography ==
- Huddleston, Mark (1987). The Government's Managers: Report of the Twentieth Century Fund Task Force on the Senior Executive Service. Priority Press Publications. ISBN 0-87078-213-4.
- Huddleston, Mark; William W. Boyer (1995). The Higher Civil Service in the United States: Quest for Reform. Pittsburgh: University of Pittsburgh Press. ISBN 0-8229-3906-1.
- Huddleston, Mark; Dennis L. Dresang (2006). The Public Administration Workbook (fifth ed.). Longman. ISBN 0-321-27335-4.
