= Mitzi Montoya =

American academic

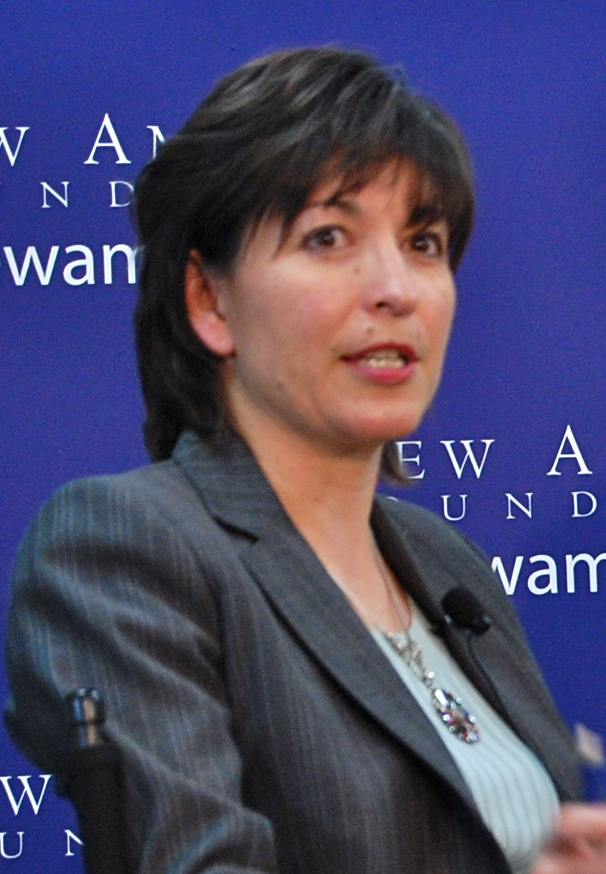
Montoya in 2012

Mitzi Montoya is Senior Vice President for Academic Affairs at the University of Utah, a researcher on innovation in education, and a public advocate for women in leadership.

== Early life and education ==
Mitzi Montoya was born on November 24, 1968 in Fort Worth, Texas and subsequently lived in Colorado, South Carolina, West Virginia and Michigan. She holds a bachelor of science degree in Engineering Arts from Michigan State University (1990) and worked as a design engineer before pursuing a Ph.D. in marketing and statistics from Michigan State, which she completed in 1995.

== Academic career ==
After her PhD, Montoya spent 15 years at North Carolina State University, 1995-2010, first as a professor and then as assistant dean. Montoya's scholarship focuses on product design optimization and advanced information technologies used in marketing and new product development. Widely cited publications include:

- Determinants of new product performance: A review and meta-analysis (Mitzi Montoya and Roger Calantone), 1994
- The effect of perceived technological uncertainty on Japanese new product development (Michael Song and Mitzi Montoya)
- "Do I Really Have To? User Acceptance of Mandated Technology" (2002)

== Leadership positions ==
Prior to joining the University of Utah, Montoya served as Dean and professor of the Anderson School of Management at the University of New Mexico (July 2020-January 2023). From 2019-2020 she served as executive vice president and professor, Washington State University; from 2015-2019 she was senior administrator, executive dean and professor, Oregon State University; from 2010-2015 she was executive dean, vice provost, vice president and professor, Arizona State University.
