= Wylie Sypher =

American non-fiction writer and Professor

- Born: December 12, 1905; Mount Kisco, New York, US
- Died: August 14, 1987 (aged 81); Hackettstown, New Jersey, US

Academic background
- Education: Amherst College; Tufts University; Harvard University

Academic work
- Discipline: history of art and literature

Feltus Wylie Sypher (December 12, 1905 – August 14, 1987) was an American non-fiction writer and professor.

Sypher was born in Mount Kisco, New York, to Harry Wylie Sypher and Martha Berry. He graduated from Amherst College in 1927. He received a master's degree from Tufts University in 1929 and became an instructor at Simmons College. That same year he married Lucy Johnston. In 1932, he received his second master's degree from Harvard University. He earned his Ph.D. in 1937 from Harvard.

Sypher taught summers at the University of Wisconsin, the University of Minnesota, and in the 1968 summer session he became the first Robert Frost Professor of Literature at the Bread Loaf School of English at Middlebury College, where he had taught since 1957. He was twice awarded a Guggenheim Fellowship for research in the theory of fine arts and literature.

He died in Hackettstown, New Jersey, in 1987.

== Works ==
- Four Stages of Renaissance Style: Transformations in Art and Literature, 1400–1700. Garden City, NY: Doubleday. 1955.
- Rococo to Cubism in Art and Literature (1960)
- Loss of the Self in Modern Literature and Art (1962)
- Literature and Technology: The Alien Vision (1968)
- The Ethic of Time: Structures of Experience in Shakespeare (1976)
- Art History: An Anthology of Modern Criticism (editor, 1963)
