= James W. Dean Jr. =

American academic administrator

James Dean

20th President of the University of New Hampshire
- In office June 30, 2018 – June 30, 2024
- Preceded by: Mark Huddleston
- Succeeded by: Elizabeth S. Chilton

Personal details
- Born: 1956 (age 69–70)
- Education: Catholic University of America (BA); Carnegie Mellon University (MA, PhD)

Academic background
- Thesis: An investigation of quality circles (1983)

Academic work
- Discipline: Organizational Behavior
- Institutions: University of North Carolina at Chapel Hill; University of New Hampshire

James Warren Dean Jr. is an American educator who served as the 20th President of the University of New Hampshire from 2018 to 2024. Dean earned his Ph.D. and master's degrees in organizational behavior from Carnegie Mellon University, as well as a Bachelor's degree in Psychology from The Catholic University of America.

== Education ==
Dean graduated from the Catholic University of America, where he earned a bachelor's degree. He subsequently earned a PhD from Carnegie Mellon University.

== Career ==
Dean was professor of Organizational Behavior at the University of North Carolina at Chapel Hill's Kenan–Flagler Business School, and served as the school's dean from 2008 from 2013. He was also UNC's executive vice chancellor and provost. As provost, he led a number of efforts to support student success, worked to enhance retention and graduation rates, and reorganized resources to better prepare students for life and success after college. Dean also helped to lead a transition toward a new university wide budget model.

Prior to serving as provost, Dean served as the dean of the UNC Kenan–Flagler Business School, where he launched an online MBA program that increased revenue by millions of dollars. His work in the business school started shortly after he joined the faculty at UNC in 1997, when he was asked to lead the Kenan-Flagler Business School's flagship MBA program. As associate dean for executive education, Dean recruited new clients, including the United States Navy and the United States Air Force, and increased revenue by 60 percent.

Dean succeeded Mark Huddleston as the 20th president of the University of New Hampshire on June 30, 2018.

After stepping down as president of the University of New Hampshire in June 2024, Dean returned to the University of North Carolina at Chapel Hill, where he has served as interim provost since May 2025 following the resignation of Christopher Clemens. His successor, Magnus Egerstedt, was announced on November 12, 2025, and began the role on March 2, 2026.

== Personal life ==
Dean and his wife, Jan, have two daughters and four grandchildren.
