= Lucy Johnston Sypher =

American novelist

Lucy Johnston Sypher (August 6, 1907 – December 1990) wrote a series of four children's books based loosely on her childhood in the small prairie town of Wales, North Dakota: The Edge of Nowhere (1972), Cousins and Circuses (1974), The Spell of the Northern Lights (1975), and The Turnabout Year (1976).

== Her life as depicted in her books ==
The books describe the writer's life early in Wales, as the daughter of George Henry (known as Harry), the town banker, and Caroline, a church organist and music teacher from a cultured, well-educated, big-city family. In the books, eleven-year-old Lucy attends a small country school and befriends the three daughters of an emigrant English family and their spoiled brother, who is nicknamed "The Prince of Wales" (punning upon his tendency to cry easily and the name of the town.) She visits her big-city cousins and is irritated by her mischievous older brother, Amory. The final book, The Turnabout Year, describes her mother's difficult recovery after the birth of her younger brother, George, and Lucy's decision to attend high school in Minneapolis.

Upon publication, Sypher said that events described in the books were highly fictionalized.

== Background ==
Sypher was raised in Wales, the daughter of George and Caroline Gale Johnston. She graduated from the University of North Dakota in Grand Forks, North Dakota in 1927 and received her master's degree from Tufts University in 1929. She was an instructor of English and history at Lasell Junior College in Auburndale, Massachusetts for some years before she published her first book.

Lucy Johnston married Wylie Sypher in 1929. She and her husband raised their family in Massachusetts.
