= University System of New Hampshire =

Public university system in New Hampshire, United States

University System of New Hampshire Locations

The University System of New Hampshire (USNH) is a system of public colleges and universities in the U.S. state of New Hampshire. It was established in 1963 and is responsible for overseeing the University of New Hampshire - Durham, the University of New Hampshire School of Law, the University of New Hampshire at Manchester, Plymouth State University, Keene State College, and previously Granite State College which has since merged with UNH. The University System of New Hampshire is the largest provider of post-secondary education in New Hampshire and is governed by a single board of trustees which is responsible for ensuring that each institution has a unique character and educational mission. Presently USNH has approximately 32,000 enrolled students annually and more than 90,000 alumni living in state. As of June 30, 2020, the Institution's endowment was valued at $798.7 million.

== Institutions ==
| Name | Location | Founded | Enrollment | Athletics nickname | Athletics conference | Athletics level |
|---|---|---|---|---|---|---|
| University of New Hampshire | Durham | 1866 | 14,500 | Wildcats | America East | NCAA Division I |
| Keene State College | Keene | 1909 | 3,213 | Owls | Little East Conference | NCAA Division III |
| Plymouth State University | Plymouth | 1871 | 4,491 | Panthers | Little East Conference | NCAA Division III |
| University of New Hampshire at Manchester | Manchester | 1985 | 1,038 | N/A | | |
| University of New Hampshire School of Law | Concord | 1973 | 596 | N/A | | |

== History ==
The decision to establish the university system came from the recommendation of the Interim Commission on Higher Education appointed in 1961 by Governor Wesley Powell. In establishing the university system, the Keene and Plymouth Teachers' Colleges were removed from the supervision of the State Board of Education, were renamed "state colleges", and placed under the jurisdiction of the Board of Trustees of the University of New Hampshire. The number of trustees increased from 13 to 22 with the establishment of the University System. The Board designated the President of the University of New Hampshire as "first among equals" and assigned the responsibility to coordinate the activities of the three institutions.

In 1972, the trustees established the School of Continuing Studies (now Granite State College) to serve the adult education needs of New Hampshire residents.

From 1963 to 1974, there was a growing concern of the trustees over the steadily increasing amount of time that senior UNH officials had to devote to the growing responsibilities to the university system. An appointed committee representing a broad spectrum of political, professional, and educational interests later named the Carter Commission recommended the employment of a System Director of Personnel and the development of a comprehensive personnel system which would provide for the establishment of a statewide educational system. The trustees voted to physically separate the university system staff from the university staff. In summer 1974, the newly designated USNH staff moved five miles west of Durham to Lee. The trustees also had legislation passed and signed to create the position of chancellor. The chancellor was established as the chief executive and chief academic officer of the system to oversee the head of each institution, and is elected and answerable to the trustees.

== Board of trustees ==
The University System of New Hampshire is governed by a 29-member board of trustees comprising the governor, the Senate president, the House speaker, ten members appointed by the governor and Executive Council, seven alumni-elected members, two student-elected members, the education commissioner, the agriculture commissioner, the presidents of the university system's four colleges and universities, and the chancellor. The chancellor is the chief executive officer of the university system.
