= Granite State College =

Public college in Concord, New Hampshire, US (1972–2023)

- Type: Public college
- Active: 1972–2023
- Parent institution: University System of New Hampshire
- Accreditation: NECHE
- Location: Concord, New Hampshire, United States
- Campus: Two suburban locations
- Website: https://www.granite.edu/

Granite State College was a public college in Concord, New Hampshire, United States. It was part of the University System of New Hampshire.

In 2023, it merged into the University of New Hampshire as the College of Professional Studies at the University of New Hampshire at Manchester.

== History ==
Granite State College was founded in 1972 as The School for Lifelong Learning in Lee, Strafford County, New Hampshire, United States. The School for Lifelong Learning (later the College for Lifelong Learning, then Granite State College, and now the UNH College of Professional Studies) was headquartered in Concord, New Hampshire, and operated via a statewide network of regional academic centers rather than a single traditional campus. Main administrative offices were based in Concord (latterly at 25 Hall Street). Rather than one main residential campus, it operated multiple regional educational centers across New Hampshire (including sites in Manchester, Portsmouth, Concord, Conway, Rochester, and remote partnerships) alongside robust online programs. Following its 2023 merger into the University System of New Hampshire, its legacy operations and physical/online presence function under the UNH College of Professional Studies with a major footprint in Manchester and Concord.

== Academics ==
Accredited by the New England Commission of Higher Education, Granite State College offered associate and bachelor's degrees, master's degrees, post-baccalaureate programs for teacher education, transfer opportunities, and 100% online degree programs.

In 2021, Granite State College's online undergraduate programs were ranked 57th and its online graduate business programs were ranked 105th among "Best Online Degree Programs" by U.S. News & World Report. In 2017, Granite State College was ranked 13th in Washington Monthly's 2017 rankings and first in New England.

== Locations ==
Granite State College was headquartered in Concord and maintained a campus in Manchester, as well as online. The college nurtured strong partnerships with the Community College System of New Hampshire, which included on-site classrooms at Nashua Community College and the Lebanon campus of River Valley Community College. Additional partnerships with Manchester Community College and Great Bay Community College's Pease International Tradeport campus provided shared resources and transfer pathways for local students.
