= Hezekiah S. Russell =

American politician (1835–1914)

Hezekiah Stone Russell
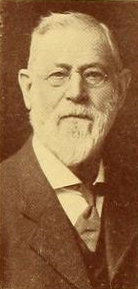

6th Mayor of Pittsfield, Massachusetts
- In office 1900–1901
- Preceded by: Allen H. Bagg
- Succeeded by: Kelton B. Miller

Member of the Massachusetts House of Representatives Sixth Berkshire District
- In office 1907–1907

Member of the Pittsfield, Massachusetts City Council
- In office 1897–1898

Member of the Pittsfield, Massachusetts Board of Public Works
- In office 1892–1895

Member of the Board of Selectmen for the Town of Pittsfield, Massachusetts
- In office 1887–1888

Personal details
- Born: December 7, 1835 Pittsfield, Massachusetts
- Died: May 12, 1914 (aged 78) Pittsfield, Massachusetts
- Party: Republican
- Education: Mount Pleasant Academy, Amherst, Massachusetts; 1852
- Profession: Boilermaking plant operator.

Hezekiah Stone Russell (December 7, 1835 – May 12, 1914) was an American businessman and politician who served as the sixth Mayor of Pittsfield, Massachusetts.

== Education ==
Russell graduated from Mount Pleasant Academy in Amherst, Massachusetts in 1852.

== Business career ==
From 1865 to 1902 Russell operated a Boilermaking plant in Pittsfield, Massachusetts.

== Public service ==
Russell was on the Pittsfield, Massachusetts Board of Public Works from 1892 to 1895, the City Council from 1897 to 1898. and Mayor of Pittsfield, from 1900 to 1901.

== Mayor of Pittsfield ==
On December 5, 1899, Russell was elected Mayor of Pittsfield, Massachusetts by a small majority over S. A. Bailey. Russell served as Mayor of Pittsfield, from 1900 to 1901.

== Massachusetts House of Representatives ==
Russell was elected to serve in the Massachusetts House of Representatives for 1907. Russell received 921 votes versus his opponents. Democratic party candidate A. S. Prout received 406 votes, and the Socialist party candidate C. E. Hoff received 39 votes. Russell served on the Committee on Roads and Bridges in the House of 1907.

== Death ==
Russell died in Pittsfield, Massachusetts on May 12, 1914.

== Notes ==
Political offices
Preceded by William W. Whiting	Mayor of Pittsfield, Massachusetts; 1900–1901	Succeeded by Daniel England
