= William C. Moulton =

American politician (1873–1927)

William Clarence Moulton
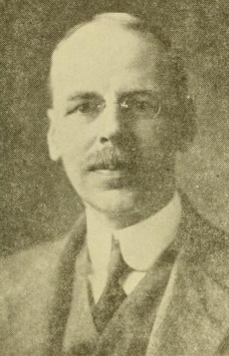

Member of the Massachusetts Senate Berkshire District
- In office 1920–1922
- Succeeded by: William A. O'Hearn

Mayor of Pittsfield, Massachusetts
- In office 1917–1919

Member of the Pittsfield, Massachusetts Board of Aldermen
- In office 1913–1914

Member of the Pittsfield, Massachusetts Common Council
- In office 1911–1912

Personal details
- Born: October 15, 1873 Lee, Massachusetts
- Died: December 14, 1927 (aged 54) Pittsfield, Massachusetts
- Party: Republican
- Profession: Insurance

William Clarence Moulton (October 15, 1873 – December 14, 1927) was an American politician who served as a member of the Massachusetts Senate, as well as a member of the Common Council, Board of Aldermen and Mayor of Pittsfield, Massachusetts.

== See also ==
- 1920 Massachusetts legislature
- 1921–1922 Massachusetts legislature

== Notes ==
Political offices
| Preceded by George W. Faulkner | Mayor of Pittsfield, Massachusetts; 1917–1919 | Succeeded by Louis A. Merchant |
