= Custom House Maritime Museum =

Custom House Maritime Museum may refer to:

- United States Customhouse (Newburyport, Massachusetts)
- New London Customhouse, in Connecticut
