= 1960 United States presidential election in Hawaii =

- November 8, 1960
- Turnout: 93.6%

Nominee	John F. Kennedy	Richard Nixon
Party	Democratic	Republican
Home state	Massachusetts	California
Running mate	Lyndon B. Johnson	Henry Cabot Lodge Jr.
Electoral vote	3	0
Popular vote	92,410	92,295
Percentage	50.03%	49.97%

Kennedy
50–60%
60–70%
Nixon
50–60%
President before election
Dwight D. Eisenhower
Republican
Elected President
John F. Kennedy
Democratic

The 1960 presidential election in Hawaii was held on November 8, 1960, as part of the 1960 United States presidential election. This was the first presidential election in which Hawaii participated; the state had been admitted to the Union just over a year earlier. The islands favored Senator John F. Kennedy, a Democrat, by a narrow margin of 115 votes, or 0.06%, after a court-ordered recount overturned an initial result favoring Vice President Richard Nixon, a Republican. The result was considered an upset.

This was one of only two presidential elections since statehood that Hawaii voted more Republican than the national average. The other was 1972, when it voted 0.8% more Republican than the national average, also with Nixon on the GOP ticket. This is also one of only two elections in which Hawaii's counties did not all back the same candidate, the other being 1980, where the winner of each county was of the opposite party as in 1960. Unlike in the 1960 election, Honolulu voting Republican in 1980 was not sufficient to single-handedly carry the state, while all three other counties voted for Jimmy Carter. As of 2024, Hawaii's first presidential election remains the closest in the state's history.

== Background ==
The Hawaii Republican Party was traditionally dominant in the Territory of Hawaii and held a majority in the territorial legislature between 1901 and 1955. However, the Democratic Party of Hawaii gained control of both chambers of the territorial legislature and a large amount of local offices in the 1954 election.

== Campaign ==
The major newspapers, The Honolulu Advertiser and Honolulu Star-Bulletin, supported Nixon. Nixon's campaign spent $100,000 while Kennedy's campaign spent $40,000.

=== Polling ===
Poll source	Date(s) administered	Sample size	Margin of error	John F. Kennedy Democratic	Richard Nixon Republican	Other / Undecided
Robert S. Craig and Associates	October 17–19, 1960			37%	35%	28%

== Results ==
1960 United States presidential election in Hawaii
Party	Candidate	Votes	Percentage	Electoral votes
Democratic	John F. Kennedy	92,410	50.03%	3
Republican	Richard Nixon	92,295	49.97%	0

=== Results by county ===
County	John F. Kennedy Democratic		Richard Nixon Republican		Margin		Total votes cast
County	#	%	#	%	#	%	Total votes cast
Hawaii	11,557	48.54%	12,251	51.46%	-694	-2.92%	23,808
Honolulu	68,915	51.25%	65,541	48.75%	3,374	2.50%	134,456
Kauaʻi	4,636	45.05%	5,655	54.95%	-1,019	-9.90%	10,291
Maui	7,302	45.21%	8,848	54.79%	-1,546	-9.58%	16,150
Totals	92,410	50.03%	92,295	49.97%	115	0.06%	184,705

== Analysis ==
The election, and the subsequent recount, are notable for giving rise to the first occurrence of "dueling" electoral slates in American history since the 1887 enactment of the Electoral Count Act. During the 2000 United States presidential election recount in Florida, Congresswoman Patsy Mink suggested that the election could serve as a potential precedent to extend Vice President Al Gore's challenge to the official results beyond the Electoral Count Act's "safe harbor" deadline, though this was ultimately not acted upon. During the attempts to overturn the 2020 United States presidential election, the election was cited as a potential precedent by supporters of President Donald Trump, despite important differences, including the fact that the Hawaiian Democratic slate was certified by Governor Quinn. Even if the recounts in Hawaii succeeded in giving Nixon the state, Kennedy would have still won the presidency with 300 electoral votes to Nixon's 222.

=== Recount ===
Early unofficial totals suggested that Kennedy had won the state by 92 votes. However, errors in the official tabulation sheets reversed this result and instead suggested a 141-vote victory for Nixon. Democrats highlighted various apparent errors in the tabulation, including 34 precincts where the number of total votes cast in the precinct was smaller than the sum of Nixon's and Kennedy's vote totals, and other precincts where the number of total votes cast was much larger than the combined votes for Nixon and Kennedy.

On November 22, attorney Robert Gray Dodge filed a recount petition on behalf of thirty members of the Democratic Party of Hawaii in a Honolulu circuit court. Dodge did not allege any voter fraud, instead merely observing that the tabulation sheets were not consistent in various precincts. State Republican Party officials also considered supporting the recount petition, but were internally divided and eventually declined to join it. One elector on the Republican slate, O. P. Soares, opposed the recount petition. All three electors on the Republican slate were named as defendants, along with Republican Lieutenant Governor James Kealoha, who at the time was serving as acting governor of the state and would be required to sign any certificate of ascertainment. Attorney General Shiro Kashiwa also joined the suit to represent the state's interests.

Despite the apparent tabulation errors, Acting Governor Kealoha certified Nixon's 141-vote victory on November 28. Kealoha certified the result after two audits of the tabulation sheets by his office, and may have had no option other than to certify, as he lacked authority to inspect or retabulate the actual ballots cast.

Litigation was still ongoing on December 13, the safe harbor deadline for certification under the Electoral Count Act. As only the Republican slate had so far been certified by the state's governor, its votes would be the only ones eligible for safe harbor status. Republicans argued that the litigation should end, since even if the recount should result in a Kennedy victory, under the rules of the Electoral Count Act Congress was required to presume that the Republican electors were the validly appointed electors for Hawaii.

However, the following day, the presiding circuit court judge Ronald B. Jamieson ordered a partial recount to begin. A limited retabulation showed Nixon's margin over Kennedy decreasing, and as more ballots were opened and retabulated on subsequent days, Nixon's lead shrank and eventually disappeared. By December 18, the partial recount showed Kennedy leading Nixon in the state by 55 votes.

The recount was thus still ongoing on December 19, the day specified in U.S. law for the casting of votes by the members of the electoral college. As a consequence, both the officially certified Republican slate of electors (Gavien A. Bush, J. Howard Worrall, and O. P. Soares) and an "unofficial" Democratic slate of electors (Jennie K. Wilson, William H. Heen, and Delbert E. Metzger) convened in the ʻIolani Palace and cast competing electoral votes for Nixon and Kennedy just one minute apart. Certificates for both slates' electoral votes were sent to Franklin G. Floete, the Administrator of General Services.

Also on December 19, Jamieson ordered a complete statewide recount, which concluded on December 28 and showed a Kennedy victory by 115 votes. Based on this recount, Jamieson ordered that the Democratic slate of Wilson, Heen, and Metzger be named the validly appointed presidential electors for the state of Hawaii on December 30. Attorney General Kashiwa declined to appeal the verdict, and Governor William F. Quinn, a Republican, certified the Democratic slate of electors on January 4, 1961, in a letter to Administrator Floete. The state government also rushed a letter to Congress by air mail to indicate that a new certification was on its way.

During the congressional joint session to tabulate electoral votes on January 6, 1961, Nixon (who presided over the session in his capacity as President of the Senate), presented both the Republican and Democratic electoral certificates. To head off the possibility of a floor objection by Democrats such as Representative Daniel Inouye, Nixon then requested and received unanimous consent from the joint session for the Democratic certificate to be counted and the Republican certificate to be set aside, though he specified that this was being done "without the intent of establishing a precedent".

== Works cited ==
- Tuttle, Daniel (1961). "The 1960 Election in Hawaii". The Western Political Quarterly. 14 (1). University of Utah: 331–38. doi:10.2307/443854. JSTOR 443854.
