= Harry D. Sisson =

American politician (1863–1938)

Member of the Massachusetts House of Representatives 38th Berkshire District
- In office 1929–1938

8th Mayor of Pittsfield, Massachusetts
- In office 1903–1904
- Preceded by: Allen H. Bagg
- Succeeded by: Kelton B. Miller

Tax Assessor for the City of Pittsfield, Massachusetts
- In office 1896–1900

Tax Collector for the City of Pittsfield, Massachusetts
- In office 1892–1894

Personal details
- Born: Harry Dwight Sisson; January 9, 1863
- Died: November 4, 1938 (aged 75)
- Resting place: Pittsfield Cemetery
- Party: Republican
- Spouse: Elizabeth C. Wells (m. 1886)
- Education: New Marlborough Academy
- Profession: Editor of the Connecticut Western News of Canaan, Connecticut; Employed Kellogg Shoe Company (in 1882); Agent of the Berkshire Life Insurance Co. Proprietor of the Sisson/Robinson Company (manufacturing paper boxes). From 1904 founder and proprietor of the Sisson Buick Co.

Harry Dwight Sisson (January 9, 1863 – November 4, 1938) was an American businessman and politician who served as the eighth mayor of Pittsfield, Massachusetts from 1903 to 1904.

== Biography ==
Sisson was a member of the Sons of Veterans. In 1919, he was elected to a one year term as national commander-in-chief of the organization.

Sisson's parents were Henry Dwight Sisson (1836–1914) and Emilie Persis Spaulding (1836–1923). Sisson married Elizabeth C. Wells (1860–1955) on February 17, 1886. He is buried in the Pittsfield Cemetery in Pittsfield, Massachusetts.

== See also ==
- Massachusetts legislature: 1929–1930, 1931–1932, 1933–1934, 1935–1936, 1937–1938

== Notes ==
Political offices
Preceded by Daniel England	Mayor of Pittsfield, Massachusetts; 1903–1904	Succeeded by Allen H. Bagg
