= Robert Dodge =

Robert Dodge may refer to:

- Robert K. Dodge (1928–2017), American politician, member of the New Hampshire House of Representatives
- Robert Gray Dodge (1872–1964), American lawyer
