= Newburyport, Massachusetts =

- City
- Downtown Newburyport, 2026

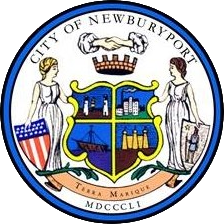
- Seal

- Location in Essex County and the state of Massachusetts

- Location in the United States
- Coordinates: 42°48′45″N 70°52′40″W
- Country: United States
- State: Massachusetts
- County: Essex
- Settled: 1635
- Incorporated as a town: 1764
- Incorporated as a city: 1851

Government
  - Type: Mayor-council city
  - Mayor: Sean R. Reardon

Area
  - Total: 10.71 sq mi (27.74 km^{2})
  - Land: 8.35 sq mi (21.63 km^{2})
  - Water: 2.36 sq mi (6.11 km^{2})
- Elevation: 36 ft (11 m)

Population (2020)
  - Total: 18,289
  - Density: 2,190.2/sq mi (845.66/km^{2})
- Time zone: UTC−5 (Eastern)
  - Summer (DST): UTC−4 (Eastern)
- ZIP Code: 01950
- Area code: 351/978
- FIPS code: 25-45245
- GNIS feature ID: 0614293
- Website: www.cityofnewburyport.com

Newburyport is a coastal city in Essex County, Massachusetts, United States, 35 miles (56 km) northeast of Boston. The population was 18,289 at the 2020 census. A historic seaport with a vibrant tourism industry, Newburyport includes part of Plum Island. The mooring, winter storage, and maintenance of recreational boats, motor and sail, still generate much of the city's income. A Coast Guard station oversees boating activity, especially in the sometimes dangerous tidal currents of the Merrimack River.

At the edge of the Newbury Marshes, delineating Newburyport to the south, an industrial park provides a wide range of jobs. Newburyport is on a major north–south highway, Interstate 95. The outer circumferential highway of Boston, Interstate 495, passes nearby in Amesbury. The Newburyport Turnpike (U.S. Route 1) traverses Newburyport on its way north. The Newburyport/Rockport MBTA commuter rail from Boston's North Station terminates in Newburyport. The earlier Boston and Maine Railroad leading farther north was discontinued, but part of it was converted into a recreation trail.

== History ==
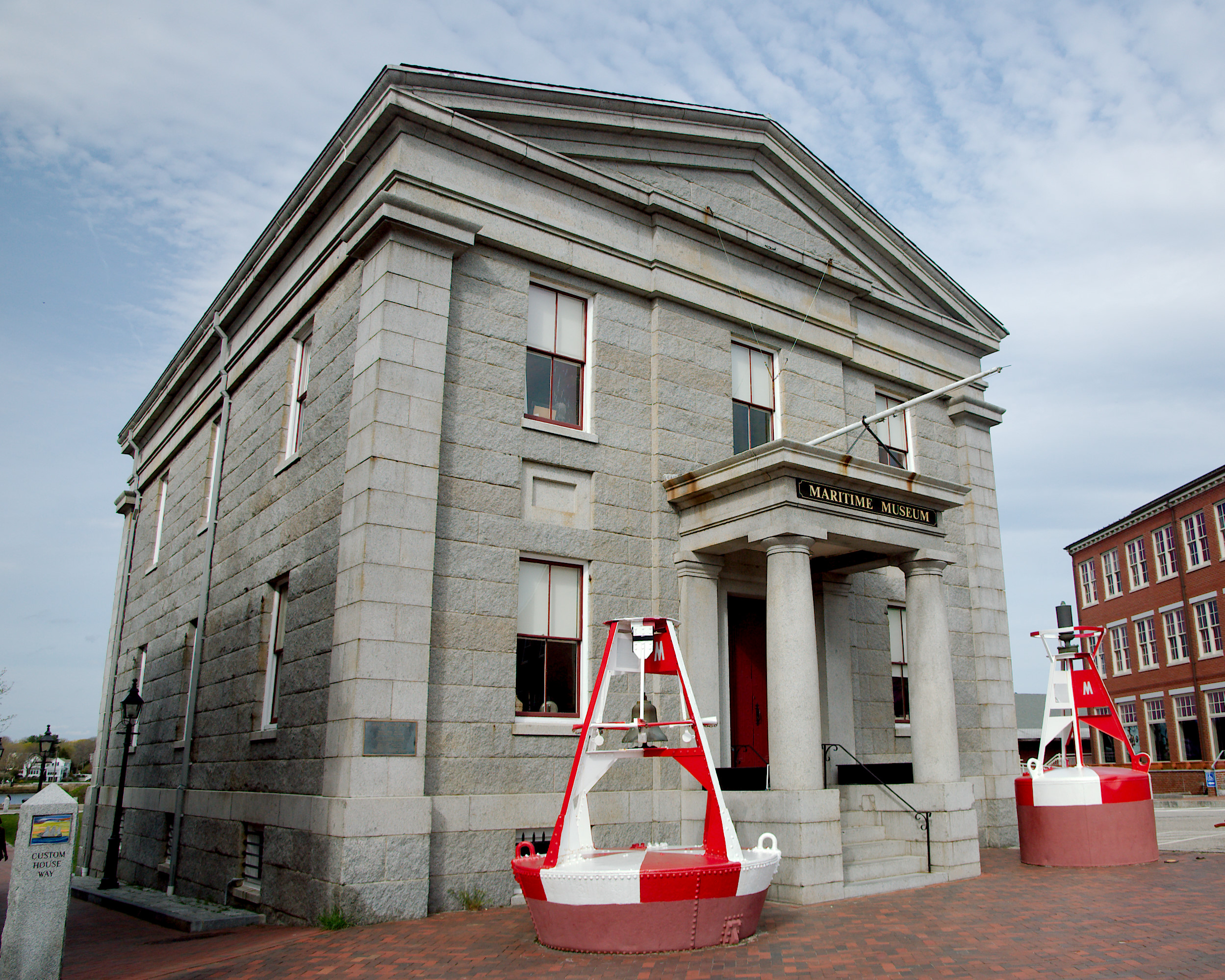
The Custom House Maritime Museum

In 1680 Elizabeth Morse was convicted of witchcraft in Newbury. She was confined to her property unless she was escorted by a clergymen until she died in 1690.

On January 28, 1764, the General Court of Massachusetts passed "An act for erecting part of the town of Newbury into a new town by the name of Newburyport." The act begins:

Whereas the town of Newbury is very large, and the inhabitants of that part of it who dwell by the water-side there, as it is commonly called, are mostly merchants, traders, and artificers, and the inhabitants of the other parts of the town are chiefly husbandmen; by means whereof many difficulties and disputes have arisen in managing their public affairs – Be it enacted ... That part of the said town of Newbury ... be and hereby are constituted and made a separate and distinct town ....

The act was approved by Governor Francis Bernard on February 4, 1764. The new town was the smallest in Massachusetts, covering an area of 647 acres (2.62 km^{2}), and had a population of 2,800 living in 357 homes. There were three shipyards, no bridges, and several ferries, one of which at the foot of Greenleaf Lane, now State Street, carried the Portsmouth Flying Stage Coach, running between Portsmouth, New Hampshire, and Boston.

The town prospered and became a city in 1851. Situated near the mouth of the Merrimack River, it was once a fishing, shipbuilding and shipping center, with an industry in silverware manufacture. In 1792, a bridge was built two miles above the town where the river contained an island. Merrimack Arms and Brown Manufacturing Company made Southerner Derringer pistols in their Newburyport factory from 1867 to 1873. The sea captains of old Newburyport (as elsewhere in Massachusetts) had participated vigorously in the triangular trade, importing West Indian molasses and exporting rum made from it. The distilleries were located around Market Square near the waterfront. Caldwell's Old Newburyport rum was manufactured locally until 1961.

As a part of the triangle trade, the first leg of which involved the purchase of slaves from West Africa, many Newburyporters were anti-abolitionists. Massachusetts abolished slavery in 1783, and many runaway slaves found refuge in the state. In the early 1800s, around 6000 runaway slaves were living in Newburyport. In 1850, the fugitive slave act was passed, requiring all US states to capture and return runaway slaves. Because of this, runaways had to flee the country or risk returning to slavery. In this era, some white Newburyporters became stops on the Underground Railroad. As a port city and part of the triangle trade, Newburyport's abolitionists were often mariners. Capt. Alexander Graves, for example, smuggled slaves from the South and to Canada.

Newburyport once had a fishing fleet that operated from Georges Bank to the mouth of the Merrimack River. It was a center for privateering during the Revolutionary War and War of 1812. Beginning about 1832, it added numerous ships to the whaling fleet. Later, clipper ships were built there. Today, the city gives little hint of its former maritime importance. Notably missing are the docks, which are shown on earlier maps extending into the channel of the Merrimack River, and the shipyards, where the waterfront parking lot is currently located.

George Whitefield, the well-known and influential English preacher who helped inspire the First Great Awakening in America, arrived in Newburyport in September 1740. The revival that followed his labors brought into existence Old South Church, where he was buried after his death in 1770.

The city's historical highlights include:

Historic events:

- First of many clipper ships built here.
- First "Tea Party" rebellion to oppose British Tea Tax.
- First state mint and treasury building.
- Newburyport Superior Courthouse, the oldest continuously active courthouse in Massachusetts.

The Newburyport Five Cents Savings Bank on State Street was founded in 1854 and is one of the oldest banks in the United States still in operation.

Historic houses and museums:

- Cushing House Museum and Garden (c. 1808)
- Newburyport Custom House Museum (1835), designed by Robert Mills

Literary interests:

- Was referred to in the H. P. Lovecraft story, "The Shadow Over Innsmouth", as being located near Innsmouth. Lovecraft based his depiction of Innsmouth largely on Newburyport.
- Subject of the most ambitious community study ever undertaken, the Yankee City project conducted by anthropologist W. Lloyd Warner and his associates

=== Timeline ===
Timeline of Newburyport, Massachusetts
- 1635: Newbury incorporated.
- 1761: Belleville Congregational Church founded.
- 1764: Newburyport incorporated (formerly part of Newbury).
- 1772: Marine Society of Newburyport established.
- 1773
  - Isaiah Thomas opens "a printing house in King Street."
  - Essex Journal newspaper begins publication.
- 1790: Population: 4,837.
- 1793: Impartial Herald newspaper begins publication.
- 1794
  - Morning Star newspaper begins publication.
  - Newburyport Woolen Manufacturing Co. established.
- 1795
  - Political Gazette newspaper begins publication.
  - Merrimack Bank incorporated.
- 1797: Newburyport Herald newspaper begins publication.
- 1799: Newburyport Marine Insurance Co. incorporated.
- 1801: American Intelligencer newspaper published.
- 1802: Merrimac Humane Society established.
- 1803
  - Merrimack Gazette and New England Repertory newspapers begin publication.
  - Newburyport Female Charitable Society organized.
  - Merrimack Fire and Marine Insurance Co. incorporated.
- 1804: Political Calendar newspaper begins publication.
- 1805: Merrimack Magazine begins publication.
- 1807: Newburyport Gazette newspaper begins publication.
- 1808: Statesman newspaper begins publication.
- 1810
  - Newburyport Mechanick Association and Newburyport Athenaeum incorporated.
  - Independent Whig newspaper begins publication.
  - Merrimack Bible Society organized.
- 1812: Washington Benevolent Society organized.
- 1818: Howard Benevolent Society instituted "for the relief of the sick and destitute."
- 1825: Newburyport Hosiery Co. established.
- 1829: Newburyport Lyceum organized.
- 1835
  - Society for the Relief of Aged Females founded.
  - U.S. Custom House built.
- 1836
  - Newburyport Linnean Society and Newburyport Steam Cotton Co. incorporated.
  - Newburyport Silk Co. and Newburyport Ladies' Bethel Society established.
- 1837: Bartlet Steam Mills incorporated.
- 1840: Pleasant Street Christian Church organized.
- 1841: Essex North District Medical Society organized.
- 1842: James Steam Mills incorporated.
- 1844: Essex Steam Mills incorporated.
- 1845: Globe Steam Mills and Ocean Steam Mills incorporated.
- 1850
  - Ladies' General Charitable Society instituted.
  - Newburyport Gas Co. incorporated.
- 1851: June 18: Essex North Musical convention held.
- 1852: Merrimack Library Association organized.
- 1854
  - Newburyport Public Library founded.
  - Newburyport Five Cents Savings Bank incorporated.
- 1855: Newburyport Library Association organized.
- 1857: Mechanic Library Association incorporated.
- 1865: Washington Street Methodist Episcopal Church organized.
- 1869: Merrimack Marine Railway Co. incorporated.
- 1874: Newburyport Mutual Benefit Association organized.
- 1877: Antiquarian and Historical Society of Old Newbury established.
- 1878: Newburyport Athenaeum organized.
- 1884: Newburyport YMCA incorporated.
- 1886: Newburyport Society for the Relief of Aged Men incorporated.
- 1887: Newburyport Electric Light & Power Co. incorporated.
- 1887: Daily News established.
- 1890
  - YWCA of Newburyport incorporated.
  - City Improvement society organized.
- 1896: Newburyport Choral Union organized.
- 1904: South End Reading Room Association formed.
- 1906: Newburyport Homeoepathic Hospital opens.
- 1917: Annunciation Greek Orthodox Church of Newburyport founded.
- 1968: Newburyport Maritime Society established.
- 1971: Market Square Historic District added to National Register of Historic Places.
- 1971-1979: Downtown undergoes major renewal and historic preservation effort.
- 1991: Actors Studio of Newburyport founded.
- 1994: Sister city relationship established with Bura, Taita-Taveta District, Kenya.

== Geography ==
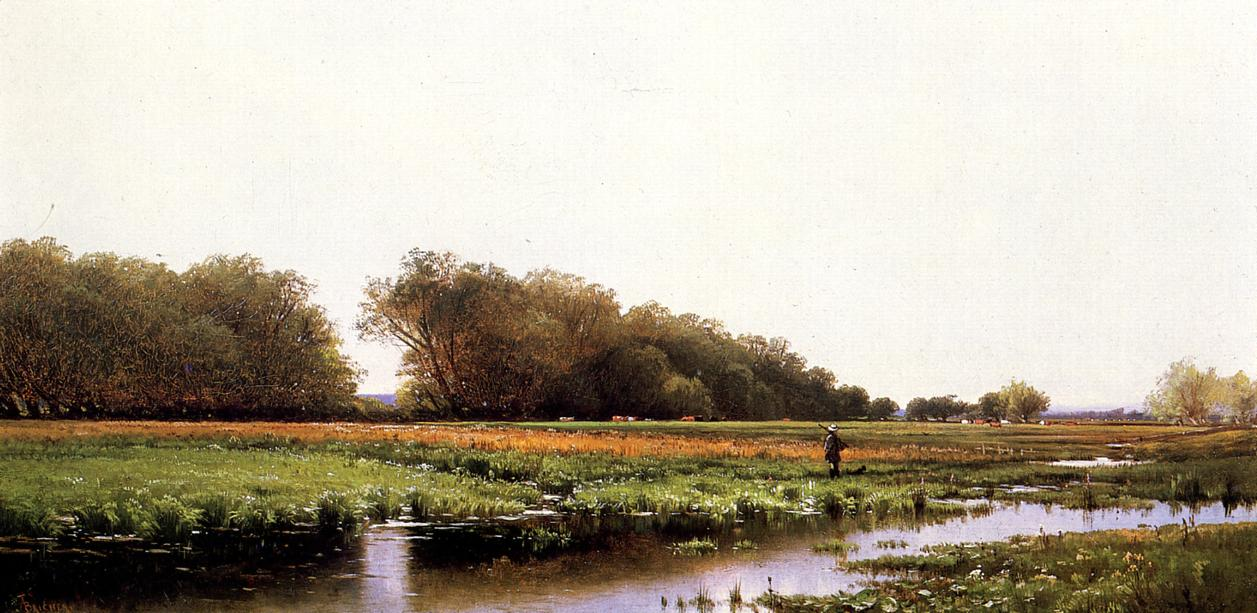
Hunter in the Meadows of Old Newburyport, Massachusetts, c. 1873, Alfred Thompson Bricher. The scene appears to be in the vicinity of the Little River. Route 1 offered the major overlook easily accessible to artists. In the far right can be seen the ridge of the right bank of the Merrimack over which High Street runs. Cattle have been turned into the marsh for pasture, a practice still allowed on some marsh farms of the area.

According to the United States Census Bureau, the city has an area of 10.6 square miles (27 km^{2}), of which 8.4 square miles (22 km^{2}) is land and 2.2 square miles (5.7 km^{2}) (20.77%) is water.

=== Geographic history ===
The city is part of Massachusetts's North Shore; Newburyport was laid out on the elevated south bank of the Merrimack River between the river and Newbury marshes. The shipyards, now boatyards (and still vigorously active), extended along the bank at the edge of the river. They were connected by Merrimac Street, which ends upriver where the bank merges into bluffs covered with pine forest. Colonial residences extend up the bank from Merrimac Street to High Street running parallel to it near the top of the ridge. The homes of the seafaring entrepreneurs line High Street. Many feature widow's walks, structures on the roof where residents could watch for the return of sailing vessels. Nearly every home maintains a splendid flower garden, most dating to colonial times. Various cross streets, such as State Street, Green Street, and Market Street, connect Merrimac Street and High Street. The top of the ridge proved an ideal location for later institutions, such as Newburyport High School and nearby Anna Jaques Hospital. The ridge drops more sharply to the marsh on the other side. Along its margin a third parallel street developed, Low Street.

The river bank gradually descends to marshes at Joppa Flats beyond downtown Newburyport. The Plum Island Turnpike was pushed out over the marsh on a causeway to a narrow part of the Plum Island River just south of where it connects to the mouth of the Merrimack. A drawbridge was built there, the only access to the island by road. On the Newburyport side a small airport, Plum Island Airport, was built at the edge of the marsh. The portion of Plum Island in the city has no direct access to the rest of the city; similarly, there is no access between the mainland and Woodbridge Island or Seal Island, west of Plum Island (the latter being shared between Newburyport and Newbury). Several parks and beaches dot the city, including Plum Island Point Beach, Simmons Beach, Joppa Park, Waterfront Park, Woodman Park, Cashman Park, Moseley Pines Park, and Atkinson Common and March's Hill Park. Newburyport Forest is in the city's southwest corner, and Maudslay State Park lies along the northwest part of the city, along the banks of the Merrimack.

=== Neighborhoods ===
- Joppa
- South End
- Plum Island. It features Plum Island Point, a site for fishing and recreation, and the Plum Island Lighthouse, built in 1838.

=== Climate ===
Climate data for Newburyport, Massachusetts (2000–2016 normals, rainfall/snowfall 1991–2020; extremes 1911–2016)
Month	Jan	Feb	Mar	Apr	May	Jun	Jul	Aug	Sep	Oct	Nov	Dec	Year
Record high °F (°C)	71 (22)	67 (19)	85 (29)	94 (34)	100 (38)	97 (36)	100 (38)	98 (37)	96 (36)	86 (30)	75 (24)	70 (21)	100 (38)
Mean maximum °F (°C)	55 (13)	54 (12)	65 (18)	83 (28)	88 (31)	92 (33)	94 (34)	92 (33)	90 (32)	79 (26)	69 (21)	60 (16)	96 (36)
Mean daily maximum °F (°C)	33.2 (0.7)	36.2 (2.3)	44.5 (6.9)	56.6 (13.7)	66.5 (19.2)	75.0 (23.9)	82.3 (27.9)	81.0 (27.2)	74.1 (23.4)	61.9 (16.6)	51.5 (10.8)	40.2 (4.6)	58.6 (14.8)
Daily mean °F (°C)	24.2 (−4.3)	26.5 (−3.1)	34.9 (1.6)	45.6 (7.6)	55.9 (13.3)	64.9 (18.3)	71.8 (22.1)	70.1 (21.2)	63.1 (17.3)	51.6 (10.9)	41.8 (5.4)	31.6 (−0.2)	48.5 (9.2)
Mean daily minimum °F (°C)	15.2 (−9.3)	16.8 (−8.4)	25.3 (−3.7)	34.6 (1.4)	45.3 (7.4)	54.9 (12.7)	61.3 (16.3)	59.2 (15.1)	52.1 (11.2)	41.3 (5.2)	32.2 (0.1)	23.0 (−5.0)	38.4 (3.6)
Mean minimum °F (°C)	−2 (−19)	2 (−17)	8 (−13)	25 (−4)	32 (0)	44 (7)	53 (12)	50 (10)	39 (4)	29 (−2)	19 (−7)	9 (−13)	−4 (−20)
Record low °F (°C)	−12 (−24)	−12 (−24)	−2 (−19)	19 (−7)	28 (−2)	39 (4)	48 (9)	46 (8)	32 (0)	25 (−4)	12 (−11)	−2 (−19)	−12 (−24)
Average precipitation inches (mm)	3.68 (93)	3.63 (92)	4.72 (120)	4.45 (113)	4.11 (104)	4.27 (108)	3.51 (89)	3.49 (89)	3.90 (99)	5.15 (131)	3.99 (101)	4.86 (123)	49.76 (1,262)
Average snowfall inches (cm)	18.0 (46)	16.1 (41)	13.4 (34)	1.8 (4.6)	0.0 (0.0)	0.0 (0.0)	0.0 (0.0)	0.0 (0.0)	0.0 (0.0)	0.1 (0.25)	1.4 (3.6)	11.1 (28)	61.9 (157.45)
Average extreme snow depth inches (cm)	11.0 (28)	12.0 (30)	10.0 (25)	2.0 (5.1)	0.0 (0.0)	0.0 (0.0)	0.0 (0.0)	0.0 (0.0)	0.0 (0.0)	0.0 (0.0)	1.0 (2.5)	7.0 (18)	18.0 (46)
Average precipitation days (≥ 0.01 in)	11.5	9.3	11.6	10.9	12.0	11.9	10.2	9.4	9.1	10.6	10.4	11.5	128.4
Average snowy days (≥ 0.1 in)	6.9	5.3	4.6	0.8	0.0	0.0	0.0	0.0	0.0	0.1	1.0	4.5	23.2
Source: NOAA

== Demographics ==
Historical population
Year	Pop.	±%
1790	4,837	—
1800	5,946	+22.9%
1810	7,634	+28.4%
1820	6,852	−10.2%
1830	6,375	−7.0%
1840	7,161	+12.3%
1850	9,572	+33.7%
1860	13,401	+40.0%
1870	12,595	−6.0%
1880	13,538	+7.5%
1890	13,947	+3.0%
1900	14,478	+3.8%
1910	14,949	+3.3%
1920	15,618	+4.5%
1930	15,084	−3.4%
1940	13,916	−7.7%
1950	14,111	+1.4%
1960	14,004	−0.8%
1970	15,807	+12.9%
1980	15,900	+0.6%
1990	16,317	+2.6%
2000	17,189	+5.3%
2010	17,416	+1.3%
2020	18,289	+5.0%
2024*	19,163	+4.8%
* = population estimate. Source: United States census records and Population Estimates Program data. Source: U.S. Decennial Census

=== 2020 census ===
As of the 2020 census, Newburyport had a population of 18,289. The median age was 50.3 years. 18.4% of residents were under the age of 18 and 24.0% of residents were 65 years of age or older. For every 100 females there were 86.7 males, and for every 100 females age 18 and over there were 83.4 males age 18 and over.

95.6% of residents lived in urban areas, while 4.4% lived in rural areas.

There were 7,971 households in Newburyport, of which 24.1% had children under the age of 18 living in them. Of all households, 49.4% were married-couple households, 14.7% were households with a male householder and no spouse or partner present, and 30.4% were households with a female householder and no spouse or partner present. About 33.6% of all households were made up of individuals and 16.9% had someone living alone who was 65 years of age or older.

There were 8,615 housing units, of which 7.5% were vacant. The homeowner vacancy rate was 0.8% and the rental vacancy rate was 3.8%.

Racial composition as of the 2020 census
Race	Number	Percent
White	16,765	91.7%
Black or African American	140	0.8%
American Indian and Alaska Native	12	0.1%
Asian	252	1.4%
Native Hawaiian and Other Pacific Islander	5	0.0%
Some other race	202	1.1%
Two or more races	913	5.0%
Hispanic or Latino (of any race)	461	2.5%

=== 2010 census ===
As of the census of 2010, there were 17,416 people, 8,264 households, and 4,428 families residing in the city. The population density was 2,086.2 inhabitants per square mile (805.5/km^{2}). There were 7,897 housing units at an average density of 942.0 per square mile (363.7/km^{2}). The racial makeup of the city was 90.2% White, 3.6% African American, 0.1% Native American, 0.61% Asian, 0.01% Pacific Islander, 0.16% from other races, and 1.2% from two or more races. Hispanic or Latino people of any race were 2.7% of the population. The top five ethnic groups are: (United States 2010 Census quickfacts)

- Irish – 25%
- English – 16%
- Italian – 11%
- French (except Basque) – 7%
- German – 6%

There were 7,519 households, out of which 25.9% had children under the age of 18 living with them, 47.7% were married couples living together, 8.5% had a female householder with no husband present, and 41.1% were non-families. Of all households, 33.1% were made up of individuals, and 9.7% had someone living alone who was 65 years of age or older. The average household size was 2.24 and the average family size was 2.90.

In the city, the population was spread out, with 20.7% under the age of 18, 4.4% from 18 to 24, 32.7% from 25 to 44, 28.2% from 45 to 64, and 14.0% who were 65 years of age or older. The median age was 41 years. For every 100 females, there were 86.7 males. For every 100 females age 18 and over, there were 82.9 males.

The median income for a household in the city was $78,557, and the median income for a family was $103,306. Males had a median income of $51,831 versus $37,853 for females. The per capita income for the city was $34,187. About 2.8% of families and 5.2% of the population were below the poverty line, including 4.5% of those under age 18 and 6.9% of those age 65 or over.

== Arts and culture ==
=== Annual events ===
- Yankee Homecoming, founded in 1958, is an annual festival celebrating the natives coming home to Newburyport.
- Waterfront Concert Series at Waterfront Park.
- Newburyport Literary Festival, founded in 2006.
- Newburyport Chamber Music Festival, founded in 2001.

=== Points of interest ===
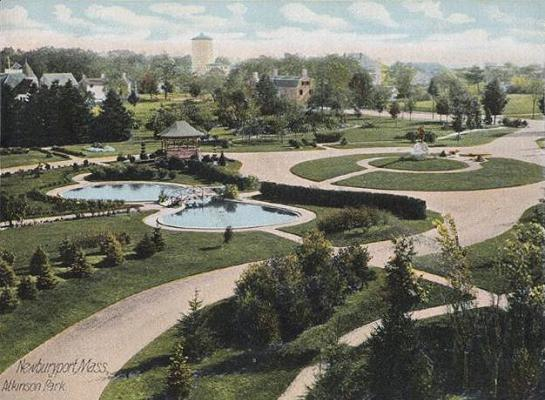
Atkinson Common in 1908

- High Street is features old Federal-style houses, and the Charles Bulfinch-designed Essex County Superior Courthouse (1805).
- Bartlett Mall (1801)
- First Presbyterian Church dates to 1756. The clock tower bell was cast by Paul Revere.
- Brown Square, featuring a statue to "Garrison the Liberator".
- Chain Bridge
- Cushing House Museum and Garden
- Joppa Flats Education Center and Wildlife Sanctuary
- Maudslay State Park
- Newburyport Brewing Company
- Parker River National Wildlife Refuge

Newburyport is served by the Newburyport Public Library, part of the Merrimack Valley Library Consortium.

== Government ==
Upon adopting a new charter in 2011 which took effect in 2013, Newburyport has been run by a mayor with a four-year term and an eleven-member City Council (prior to that, the mayor's term lasted for two years). The current mayor of Newburyport is Sean Reardon, and the next election year for mayor is 2029.

Newburyport is part of the Massachusetts Senate's 1st Essex district.

Voter registration and party enrollment as of October 15, 2008
Party	Number of voters	Percentage
Democratic	4,058	31.42%
Republican	1,700	13.16%
Unaffiliated	7,095	54.94%
Libertarian	61	0.47%
Total	12,914	100%

== Education ==
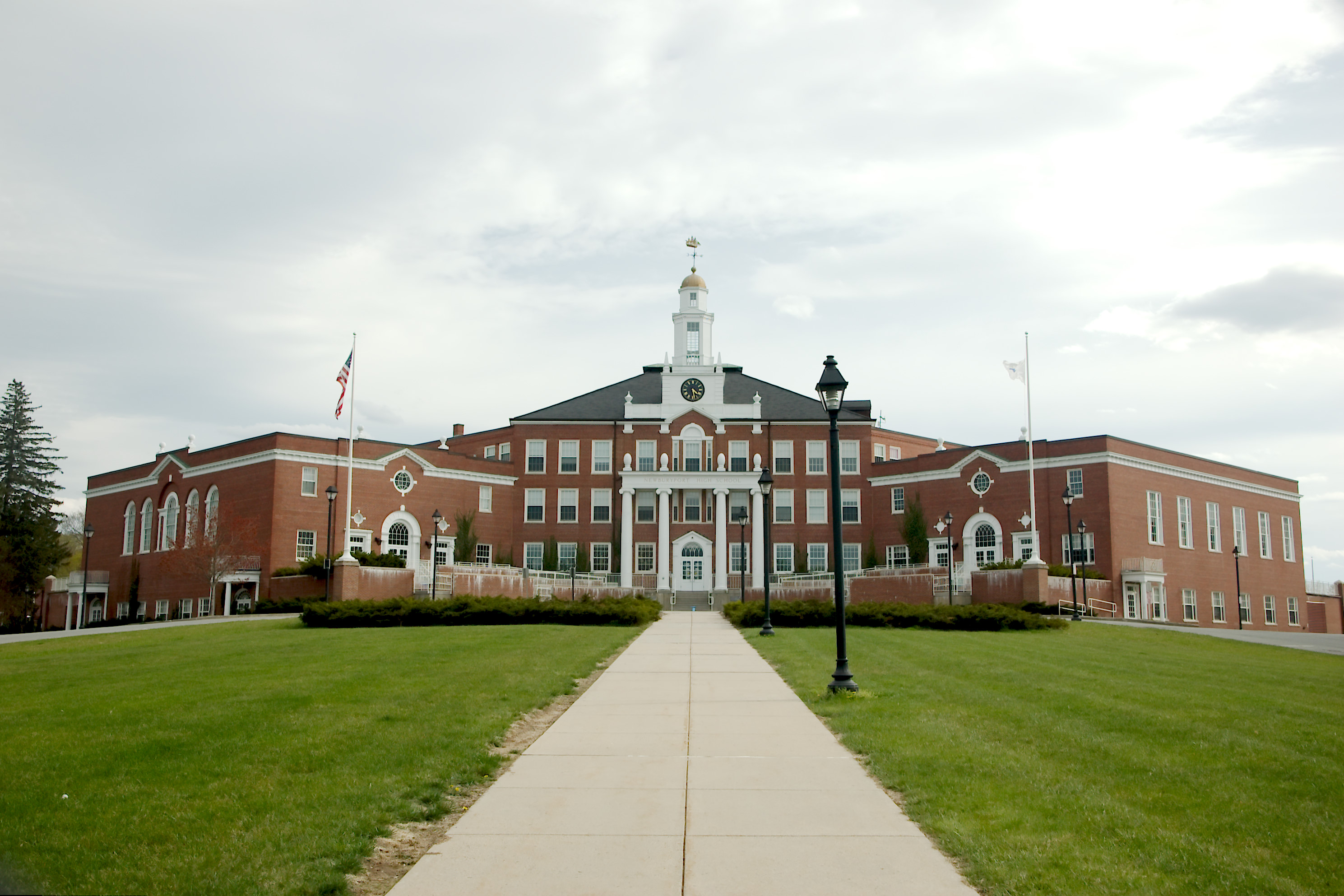
Newburyport High School

Newburyport High School was founded in 1935, and is one of the oldest public high schools in the United States.

Public education is administered by the Newburyport School District.

== Media ==
Newspapers include:

- The Daily News of Newburyport.
- The Town Common, a regional weekly newspaper.

=== Radio ===
WJOP-LP is a low power FM radio station broadcasting from Newburyport which includes local interviews, sports, and music. WNBP broadcasts from Newburyport as a simulcast of the Boston-based Bloomberg Radio affiliate WBOS. WNEF is a repeater station for the UMass Boston radio station WUMB-FM.

=== Television ===
Three local public access television stations are broadcast on Comcast: Channel 8, which broadcasts community programming, Channel 9, which broadcasts government and school board programming, and Channel 22, which broadcasts local arts and history programming.

== Infrastructure ==
=== Transportation ===
Highways include:

- Interstate 95
- Route 113
- U.S. Route 1
- Massachusetts Route 1A

The Merrimack Valley Regional Transit Authority provides bus service.

Newburyport is the northern terminus of the Newburyport/Rockport Line of the MBTA Commuter Rail system.

Plum Island Airport is a privately owned general aviation airport located within the city limits.

== Notable people ==
- John Quincy Adams (1767–1848), U.S. president, resided in Newburyport 1787–1788
- Charlotte Johnson Baker (1855–1937), physician
- Edward Bass (1726 –1803), first American Episcopal bishop of the Diocese of Massachusetts and second bishop of the Diocese of Rhode Island.
- Nikole Beckwith (born 1980), Newburyport-born and raised writer and filmmaker
- Kate Bolick (born 1972), Newburyport-born and raised author and essayist
- John Parker Boyd (1764–1830), U.S. Army Brigadier General in the War of 1812
- John Bromfield, Jr. (1779–1849), merchant
- John H. Couch (1811–1870), sea captain, pioneer and a founder of Portland, Oregon
- Osmond Richard Cummings (1923–2013), author and historian
- Caleb Cushing (1800–1879), diplomat and politician
- Timothy Dexter (1748–1806), businessman noted for his writing and eccentricity
- Robert Gray Dodge (1872–1964), Boston Attorney
- Tamsen Donner (1801–1847), pioneer and member of the Donner Party
- Andre Dubus III (born 1959), novelist
- William Lloyd Garrison (1805–1879), abolitionist
- Edmund Pike Graves (1891–1919), aviator who served as a fighter pilot during WWI and the Polish-Soviet War
- Áine Greaney (born c. 1962), writer and editor
- Adolphus Greely (1844–1935), polar explorer
- Edwin A. Grosvenor (1845–1936), author and professor of history
- Laura Coombs Hills (1859–1952), painter
- Judith Hoag (born 1968) actress
- Lucy Hooper (1816–1841), poet
- Charles Tillinghast James (1805–1862), mechanical engineer, designer, senator
- Benjamin H. Jellison (1845–1904), Medal of Honor recipient in the American Civil War
- Joe Keery (born 1992), actor
- Rufus King (1755–1827), diplomat and politician
- Frank J. Kozacka (1915–2010), politician
- Thomas B. Lawson (1807–1888), artist
- Francis Cabot Lowell (1775–1817), manufacturer
- John Lowell (1743–1802), congressman and federal judge
- George Lunt (1803–1885), editor, lawyer, author, politician
- John P. Marquand (1893–1960), author
- Donald McKay (1810–1880), shipbuilder
- Jonathan Meath (born 1955), television producer
- Johnny Messner (born 1970), actor
- Robert S. Mulliken (1896–1986), recipient of 1966 Nobel Prize in Chemistry
- Theophilus Parsons (1750–1813), jurist
- James Parton (1822–1891), biographer
- Edmund Pearson (1880–1937), librarian and true crime writer
- Jacob Perkins (1766–1849), early American inventor
- Timothy Pilsbury (1789–1858), congressman from Texas
- John F. Pingry (1818-1893), founder of The Pingry School
- Caesar Sarter (1745–after 1774), formerly enslaved essayist and abolitionist
- Harriet Prescott Spofford (1835–1921), writer
- John T. Sprague (1810–1878), US Army officer
- Charles A. Spring (1800–1891), influential Presbyterian leader in Iowa and Illinois
- Rev. Gardiner Spring (1785–1873), author of the Gardiner Spring Resolutions, which gained Abraham Lincoln the support of the Presbyterian Church
- Rev. Samuel Spring (1746–1819), religious leader, chaplain in Benedict Arnold's army
- Clara F. Stevens (1855–1934), English professor at Mount Holyoke College
- Matthew Thornton (1714–1803), signer of the Declaration of Independence
- William S. Tilton (1828–1889), Civil War brigade commander at the Battle of Gettysburg
- Peter Tolan (born 1958), television/film producer and writer
- Sydney Towle (1999-2026), American internet personality
- Richard Trefry, (1924–2023), United States Army lieutenant general.
- Charles Turner (1848–1908), painter, born in Newburyport
- Clayton Valli (1951–2003), Deaf linguist and American Sign Language poet
- William Gordon Welchman (1906–1985) English mathematician, university professor, Second World War codebreaker at Bletchley Park, United Kingdom
- William Wheelwright (1798–1873), sea captain, US consul in Chile, steamship and railroad promoter in South America
- Lothrop Withington (1856–1915), genealogist, historian, and book editor who was killed in the sinking of the RMS Lusitania
- Martha Wright (1923–2016), singer and Broadway actress

== In popular culture ==
Newburyport was the inspiration for the city of Innsmouth, the setting of the H. P. Lovecraft story The Shadow Over Innsmouth, part of the Cthulhu Mythos. The narrative also cameos the actual Newburyport in the first chapter, when the protagonist sets out on his journey to Innsmouth.

== See also ==
- The Daily News of Newburyport
- Following Atticus, 2012 book
- Newburyport Public Library
- List of newspapers in Massachusetts in the 18th century: Newburyport

== Furthur reading ==
Published in 18th–19th centuries

- Adams, John Quincy; Adams, Charles Francis (1903) [1788]. Life in a New England Town, 1787, 1788. Diary of John Quincy Adams While a student in the office of Theophilus Parsons at Newburyport. Boston: Little, Brown and Company.
- Caleb Cushing (1826), The history and present state of the town of Newburyport, Newburyport: Printed by E.W. Allen, OCLC 9488117, OL 6905508M
- Joshua Coffin (1845), A sketch of the history of Newbury, Newburyport, and West Newbury, from 1635 to 1845, Boston: S.G. Drake, OCLC 1556618, OL 6905506M
- Smith, Mrs. E. Vale (Euphemia Vale Blake) (2008) [1854]. History of Newburyport; from the Earliest Settlement of the Country to the Present Time; with a Biographical Appendix. Newburyport, Massachusetts; Internet Archive.
- Newburyport Directory. Boston: Sampson, Davenport & Co. 1874. Newburyport: Stephen H. Fowle, 1874
- Emery, Sarah Smith (1879). Reminiscences of a Nonagenarian. Newburyport: Huse & Co.
- Joseph Sabin, ed. (1881). "Newburyport, Mass.". Bibliotheca Americana. Vol. 13. New York. OCLC 13972268.
- Robert Noxon Toppan (1885), Two hundred and fiftieth anniversary of the settlement of Newbury, Newburyport: The Society, OCLC 9488114, OL 6543064M
- Hurd, Duane Hamilton, supervisor of compilation (1888). History of Essex County, Massachusetts, with Biographical Sketches of Many of the Pioneers and Prominent Men. Philadelphia: J. W. Lewis & Co. Two volumes, 957 and 1173 pages. Newburyport is in Volume II; however, there are scattered facts throughout. The first half of Volume I is downloadable from Google Books. Republished (1992) by Higginson Book Company, ISBN 0-8328-2450-X. In that edition, Hurd is called an editor.
- John J. Currier (1896), Ould Newbury, Boston: Damrell and Upham, OCLC 2482841, OL 6905507M

=== Published in 20th century ===
- John J. Currier (1902), History of Newbury, Mass., 1635-1902, Boston: Damrell & Upham, OCLC 2303477, OL 6922835M
- Currier, John J. (1906). History of Newburyport, Mass. 1764–1905 with Maps and Illustrations. Newburyport: John J. Currier. pp. 766 and 679 pages. Two volumes. Reprints and facsimiles exist.
- Oliver B. Merrill. North End Papers, 1618–1880, Newburyport, Massachusetts. Newburyport Daily News, 1906–1908.
- John J. Currier (1909), History of Newburyport, Mass., 1764-1909, Newburyport: J. Currier (v.2)
- Samuel Eliot Morison (1921). "Newburyport and Nantucket". Maritime History of Massachusetts, 1783–1860. Boston: Houghton Mifflin. hdl:2027/uc2.ark:/13960/t3bz6407p.
- Federal Writers' Project (1937), "Newburyport", Massachusetts: a Guide to its Places and People, American Guide Series, Boston: Houghton Mifflin, hdl:2027/mdp.39015014440781
- Fanny Louise Walton. Historic nuggets of Newburyport. Newburyport, Mass.: Newburyport Press, 1958
- Stephan Thernstrom (1964), Poverty and progress: social mobility in a nineteenth century city, Cambridge: Harvard University Press, OL 24748995M

=== Published in 21st century ===
- Bethany Groff (2008), Old Newbury, Charleston, SC: History Press, ISBN 9781596294813
