= WJOP-LP =

- Newburyport, Massachusetts; United States
- Frequency: 96.3 MHz
- Branding: Joppa Radio

Programming
- Format: Community

Ownership
- Owner: Newburyport Community Media Center

History
- First air date: April 16, 2016

Technical information
- Licensing authority: FCC
- Facility ID: 191764
- Class: L1
- ERP: 100 watts
- HAAT: 30 meters (98 ft)
- Transmitter coordinates: 42°48′45.23″N 70°53′10.49″W

Links
- Public license information: LMS
- Website: ncmhub.org

WJOP-LP (96.3 FM), known as Joppa Radio, is a low power FM radio station in Newburyport, Massachusetts, licensed to the Newburyport Community Media Center. With studios located in the Commerce Park building (as part of their community television facilities known as PortMedia) and antenna atop of Newburyport High School, Joppa Radio officially began broadcasting on April 16, 2016, initially with an all classical format, but intending to diversify as its listener donated library grows.
