= Clara F. Stevens =

American educator (1855–1934)

Clara Frances Stevens
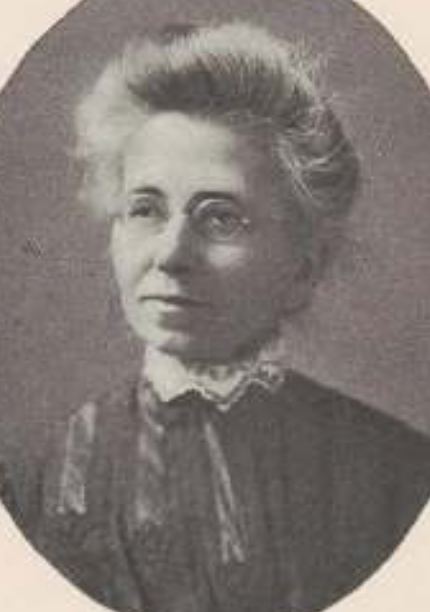
- Clara F. Stevens, from the 1910 yearbook of Mount Holyoke College
- Born: December 5, 1855; Newburyport, Massachusetts
- Died: October 18, 1934; South Hadley, Massachusetts
- Occupation: College professor

Clara Frances Stevens (December 5, 1855 – October 18, 1934) was an American college professor, head of the English department at Mount Holyoke College.

== Early life and education ==
Stevens was born in Newburyport, Massachusetts, the daughter of Cyrus Porter Stevens and Harriet Newell Bartlett Stevens. She graduated from Newburyport High School, and from Mount Holyoke College in 1881. In 1894, she completed a master's degree at the University of Michigan, where she studied under John Dewey and Fred Newton Scott.

== Career ==
Stevens taught English at the Mount Holyoke from 1881 to 1921; she held the rank of professor from 1904 to 1921, and was professor emeritus after she retired. She created the school's rhetoric department and served as chair of the English department.

She was chair of the International Institute League, supporting a women's college in Spain, run by Mount Holyoke alumna Alice Gordon Gulick. Stevens was guest of honor at a dinner of the Mount Holyoke Alumnae Association of Southern California in 1909.

== Personal life ==
Stevens lived with her younger sister Alice Porter Stevens, who was also on the faculty at Mount Holyoke. Another colleague, Flora Bridges, lived with the Stevens sisters until her death in 1912. Clara F. Stevens died at home in 1934, in South Hadley, Massachusetts. Her papers are in the archives of Mount Holyoke College.
