= Daniel England =

American businessman and politician

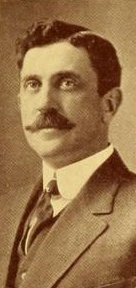

7th Mayor of Pittsfield, Massachusetts
- In office 1902–1902
- Preceded by: Hezekiah S. Russell
- Succeeded by: Harry D. Sisson

Member of the Massachusetts House of Representatives 4th Berkshire District
- In office 1898–1898
- Preceded by: William A. Whittlesey

Member of the Pittsfield, Massachusetts Common Council
- In office 1897–1897

Personal details
- Born: July 1, 1868 Pittsfield, Massachusetts
- Died: February 7, 1948
- Party: Democratic
- Spouse(s): Myra Lewl Bendell, m. June 16, 1908
- Children: Daniel England, Jr.
- Profession: Merchant

Daniel England (July 1, 1868 – February 7, 1948) was an American merchant and politician who served as the 7th Mayor of Pittsfield, Massachusetts.

== Early life ==
England was born in Pittsfield, Massachusetts on July 1, 1868. He was educated in the public schools.

== Business career ==
In 1892 England entered into the dry goods business with the firm of England Brothers.

At the time of his death England was the vice president and treasurer of the England Brothers department store.

== Public service ==
=== Pittsfield Common Council ===
In 1897 England served on the Pittsfield Common Council where he served on the Financial and Fire Department Committees.

=== Massachusetts House of Representatives ===
In 1898 England served in the Massachusetts House of Representatives, where he served on the Committee on Railroads.

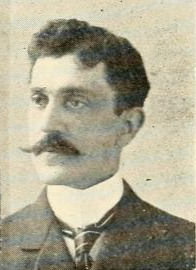
England as a Massachusetts State Representative in 1898

=== Mayor of Pittsfield ===
In 1902 England was elected as the 7th Mayor of Pittsfield, Massachusetts.

== Marriage ==
On June 16, 1908 England married Myra Lewl Bendell, daughter of Dr. and Mrs. Herman Bendell, at her family home on Capital Hill in Albany, New York. Bendell had been a military surgeon during the American Civil War and was appointed as Superintendent of Indian Affairs for Arizona in 1871.

== Death ==
England died on February 7, 1948.

== Notes ==
Political offices
| Preceded by Hezekiah S. Russell | 7th Mayor of Pittsfield, Massachusetts; 1902–1902 | Succeeded by Harry D. Sisson |
