= Flora Bridges =

American college professor

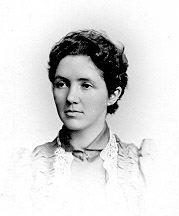
- Flora Bridges, from a 1904 publication
- Born: February 8, 1859; Salisbury, Illinois
- Died: June 13, 1912 (aged 53); South Hadley, Massachusetts
- Occupations: College professor, college dean

Flora Bridges (February 8, 1859 – June 13, 1912) was an American college professor. She taught Greek and English at Mount Holyoke College, and was Dean of Women at Yankton College and Olivet College.

== Early life ==
Bridges was born in Salisbury, Illinois, the daughter of Vernon Roe Bridges and Mary Elizabeth Boyd Bridges. Her father was a physician. She trained as a teacher, then earned a bachelor's degree in 1887 and a master's degree in 1888, all at Oberlin College, with further studies at the University of Zürich and the University of Chicago.

== Career ==
Bridges was a high school principal in Mattoon, Illinois as a young woman. She taught Greek at Mount Holyoke College from 1887 to 1892. She taught English and Greek at Butler College (1894 to 1898), Olivet College (1892 to 1893 and 1899 to 1901), and Yankton College (1901 to 1904) and served as Dean of Women at Olivet and Yankton. In 1905 she returned to Mount Holyoke to teach English. She donated a large Greek-English lexicon to the college's library in 1906. She worked closely with Marietta Kies at Mount Holyoke.

== Personal life ==
Bridges was living with her colleagues, sisters Clara F. Stevens and Alice Porter Stevens, at the time of her death in 1912, aged 53 years, from gastrointestinal tuberculosis. Clara Stevens wrote a detailed obituary about Bridges for the Oberlin Alumni Magazine. A portion of Bridges' personal scholarly library, mostly involving Greek language and literature, was donated to the Mount Holyoke College library after her death.
