= Walter Foxcroft Hawkins =

American politician

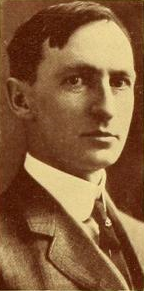

4th Mayor of Pittsfield, Massachusetts
- In office 1896–1897
- Preceded by: John Crawford Crosby
- Succeeded by: William W. Whiting

Personal details
- Born: July 12, 1863 Pittsfield, Massachusetts, U.S.
- Died: December 28, 1922 (aged 59) Pittsfield, Massachusetts, U.S.
- Spouse(s): Helen A. Rich, married October 7, 1891
- Education: Williams College A.B., 1884; Columbia Law School, LL.B. 1886.
- Profession: Attorney

Walter Foxcroft Hawkins (July 12, 1863 – December 28, 1922) was an American attorney and local political figure who, from 1896 to 1897, served as mayor of Pittsfield, the largest city and county seat of Massachusetts' Berkshire County.

A native of Pittsfield, Hawkins was the son of William T. Hawkins and his wife Harriet E. Foxcroft. He received his A.B. from Williams College in 1884 and his L.L.B. from Columbia Law School in 1886. Following his bar exams, he opened a law firm in his hometown and, on October 7, 1891, married Helen A. Rich. Following his 1896–97 term as mayor, he continued with his law practice and also served as vice president of Berkshire Life Insurance Company. At the age of 59, he killed himself at his law office in Pittsfield by shooting himself through the heart with a revolver.

== See also ==
- List of mayors of Pittsfield, Massachusetts

== Notes ==
Political offices
Preceded by John Crawford Crosby	Mayor of Pittsfield, Massachusetts; 1896–1897	Succeeded by William W. Whiting
