= Osmond Richard Cummings =

American author and historian (1923–2013)

- Born: May 17, 1923; Newburyport, Massachusetts, U.S.
- Died: January 15, 2013 (aged 89); Manchester, New Hampshire, U.S.
- Resting place: Seashore Trolley Museum, Kennebunkport, Maine, U.S.
- Education: Bentley College
- Occupations: Author, historian

Osmond Richard Cummings (May 17, 1923 – January 15, 2013) was an American author and historian. He published several histories of railroad systems in New England.

== Life and career ==
Cummings was born in Newburyport, Massachusetts, in 1923, the son of Orrin Cummings and Mary Audley. He lived in the Newburyport–Amesbury area for over thirty years.

He graduated Amesbury High School in 1940, then attended Bates College in Lewiston, Maine, for two years. He graduated from the Bentley School of Accounting and Finance in Waltham, Massachusetts, in 1948.

Cummings worked as a reporter for The Daily News of Newburyport between 1948 and 1956, before joining the New Hampshire Union Leader in Manchester, New Hampshire. He was the newspaper's copyeditor up until his retirement in 1987.

During World War II, Cummings served for three years in the United States Coast Guard, and in the United States Navy for around a year during the Korean War.

Cummings was a member of the Manchester Post 79, American Legion, Washington Lodge, 61, Free and Accepted Masons. He was also a member of the Manchester Historic Association, the Boston and Maine Historical Society, the Boston Street Railway Association, the Central Electric Railfans Association, the Shore Line Interurban Historical Society and the Pennsylvania Trolley Museum.

He wrote and had published numerous titles on the histories of street railway systems in New England, and was a member of the New England Electric Railway Historical Society. He also owned the Seashore Trolley Museum in Kennebunkport, Maine, and served on its board of trustees.

== Death ==
Cummings died in 2013, aged 89. His ashes were scattered at the Seashore Trolley Museum; he has a memorial headstone in New Hampshire State Veterans Cemetery in Boscawen, New Hampshire.

=== Selected bibliography ===
- The Biddeford and Saco Railroad (1956)
- Atlantic Shore Line Railway: its predecessors and its successors (1957)
- Portland Railroad: Part I, historical development and operations (1957)
- Portland Railroad: Part II, Rolling stock, carhouses, power supply (1959)
- Waterville, Fairfield & Oakland Railway Company (1965)
