= David A. Rose =

American lawyer (1906–1995)

David Allan Rose
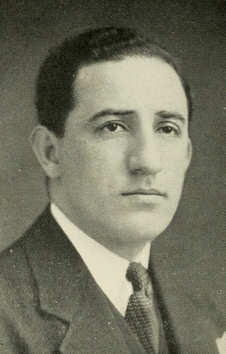
- David A. Rose in 1935

Massachusetts Appeals Court
- Retired
- In office 1972–1976

Massachusetts Superior Court
- In office 1960–1972

Personal details
- Born: 1906 Boston, Massachusetts, U.S.
- Died: April 29 1995 (aged 88–89) Fort Lauderdale, Florida, U.S.
- Spouse: Ruth June Goodman (m. 1939)
- Children: 3
- Education: Boston University; Boston University Law School

David Allan Rose (1906 – April 29, 1995) was an American lawyer and judge who served as a Massachusetts state court judge for more than 40 years and active in many community and civil rights organizations. He was a judge of the Massachusetts Superior Court (1960–1972), and then an associate justice of the Massachusetts Appeals Court (1972–1976); after reaching the mandatory retirement age of 70, he continued to serve as a recalled retired justice (1978–1985). He was the longtime chairman of the national executive committee of Anti-Defamation League of B'nai B'rith.

== Early life and education ==
Rose was born in 1906 in Boston. His father was Morris Rose. He graduated from Boston University, with a business degree, and then graduated from Boston University Law School.

== Career ==
=== Legal, legislative, and judicial career ===
In 1935, Rose was elected to the state legislature. Rose was named to the Municipal Court in Dorchester, Boston in 1936, as a part-time "special justice" (a role that allowed him to continue practicing law). He practiced with Jackson J. Holtz.

He was appointed to the Superior Court in 1960. In 1961, while on the Superior Court bench, Rose issued a ruling that led to the preservation of Walden Pond. Upon the creation of the Massachusetts Appeals Court in 1972, Governor Frank Sargent appointed Rose to the court, one of the first six justices. Having already served for 36 years on the Municipal Court and Superior Court, Rose became the Appeals Court's first senior associate justice. In March 1976, Rose reached the mandatory retirement age of 70 years, but continued to serve part-time on the bench for years after the state enacted the Court Reform Act of 1978, which allowed retired Appeals Court judges to be recalled. Rose was the first person to be a recalled retired justice in the state, and served in that role from 1978 to 1985. Rose was of counsel to Barron and Stadfeld, a law firm in Boston, from 1976 to 1978.

=== Civil rights advocacy and civil affairs ===
Rose was active in many community and civil rights organizations and held numerous positions with the New England Region of the Anti-Defamation League of B'nai B'rith (ADL). Rose was also a longtime chairman of the group's national executive committee. Rose was also involved in the creation of the Jewish Community Relations Council of Boston, its president in the 1940s, and involved in the creation of the Jewish Big Brother Association.

In 1946, Rose recommended to Boston Attorney General to investigate anti-Catholic and anti-Jewish activities of the Anglo-Saxon Federation of America. On behalf of the Anti-Defamation League of B'nai B'rith, Rose testified before Congress in 1954 in support of a revision to the flawed "loyalty" proceedings that had been brought in preceding years, many of which lacked a basis. Rose also testified before House Judiciary Committee's Subcommittee on Civil Rights in July 1955 in support of federal civil rights laws. In the 1940s, Rose served as president of the Law Society of Massachusetts. Rose also served as national chair of the Boston University Alumni Association.

== Death ==
Rose died on April 29, 1995, at Imperial Point Hospital in Fort Lauderdale, Florida, at age 89.

== Personal life ==
Rose lived in Wellesley, Massachusetts, and Fort Lauderdale, Florida.

In February 1939, Rose married Ruth June Goodman, daughter of Michael L. Goodman, then publisher of The Scranton Times-Tribune (known then as the Tribune-Scrantonian). They were the parents of three children.

== See also ==
- 1935–1936 Massachusetts legislature
