= Jabez L. Peck =

American politician

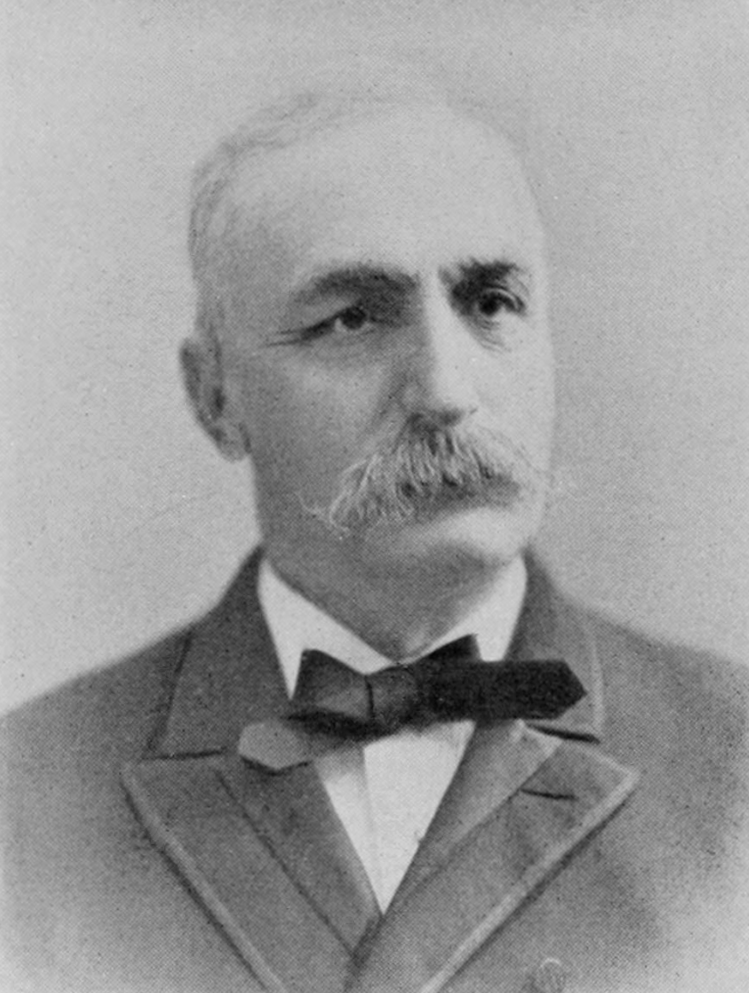

2nd Mayor of Pittsfield, Massachusetts
- In office 1892–1894
- Preceded by: Charles E. Hibbard
- Succeeded by: John C. Crosby

1st President of the Pittsfield, Massachusetts Board of Aldermen

Member of the Pittsfield, Massachusetts Board of Aldermen Ward 3

Member of the Pittsfield, Massachusetts Board of Selectmen

Personal details
- Born: December 7, 1826; Pittsfield, Massachusetts, U.S.
- Died: April 5, 1895; Pittsfield, Massachusetts, U.S.
- Political party: Republican
- Spouse: Elizabeth D. Dowse
- Children: Thomas D. Peck; Mary Clarissa Peck

Jabez L. Peck (December 7, 1826 – April 5, 1895) was an American businessman and politician who served on the Common Council, Board of Aldermen, and as Mayor, of Pittsfield, Massachusetts.

== Notes ==
Political offices
Preceded by Charles E. Hibbard	2nd Mayor of Pittsfield, Massachusetts; 1892–1894	Succeeded by John C. Crosby
