= Law Society of Massachusetts =

The Law Society of Massachusetts was a law society active in 1929–1949 in Massachusetts. It published a journal in Boston.

In 1946, the journal's editor-in-chief was Hartley C. Cutter, who in the 1970s, served as assistant attorney general.

David A. Rose served as the society's president. Among those serving on its executive board was Matthew W. Bullock.

In 1951, the society merged with the Massachusetts Bar Association (MBA).
