= Newburyport Five Cents Savings Bank =

Newburyport Bank
- Company type: Privately held company
- Industry: Banking
- Founded: April 1854; 172 years ago
- Headquarters: Newburyport, Massachusetts, United States
- Number of locations: 11 Branches
- Key people: Lloyd Hamm Jr, President & CEO; Timothy Felter, CFO
- Total assets: $1.032 billion (2019)
- Total equity: $128 million (2019)
- Website: www.newburyportbank.com

Newburyport Five Cents Savings Bank, doing business as Newburyport Bank, is a U.S. bank headquartered in Newburyport, Massachusetts. The bank has 11 branches, including 6 in Essex County, Massachusetts, 2 in Portsmouth, New Hampshire, as well as branches in the cities of Dover, Exeter, and Hampton, New Hampshire.

The bank got its name from its minimum opening deposit of five cents at the time the bank was founded in 1854.

== History ==
The bank was founded in April 1854.

In March 2011, bank president Richard Eaton retired and Janice Morse was named president and chief executive officer of the bank.

In May 2011, the bank petitioned regulators to allow to reorganize into a mutual savings bank.

In May 2012, the bank established a $400,000 scholarship fund to support local athletes.

In 2013, the bank opened 2 locations in Portsmouth, New Hampshire.

In March 2018, Janice Morse retired and Lloyd Hamm Jr. was selected as president

In March 2019 the bank changed its name to Newburyport Bank, also redesigning its logo and branding.
