= John Crawford Crosby =

American judge

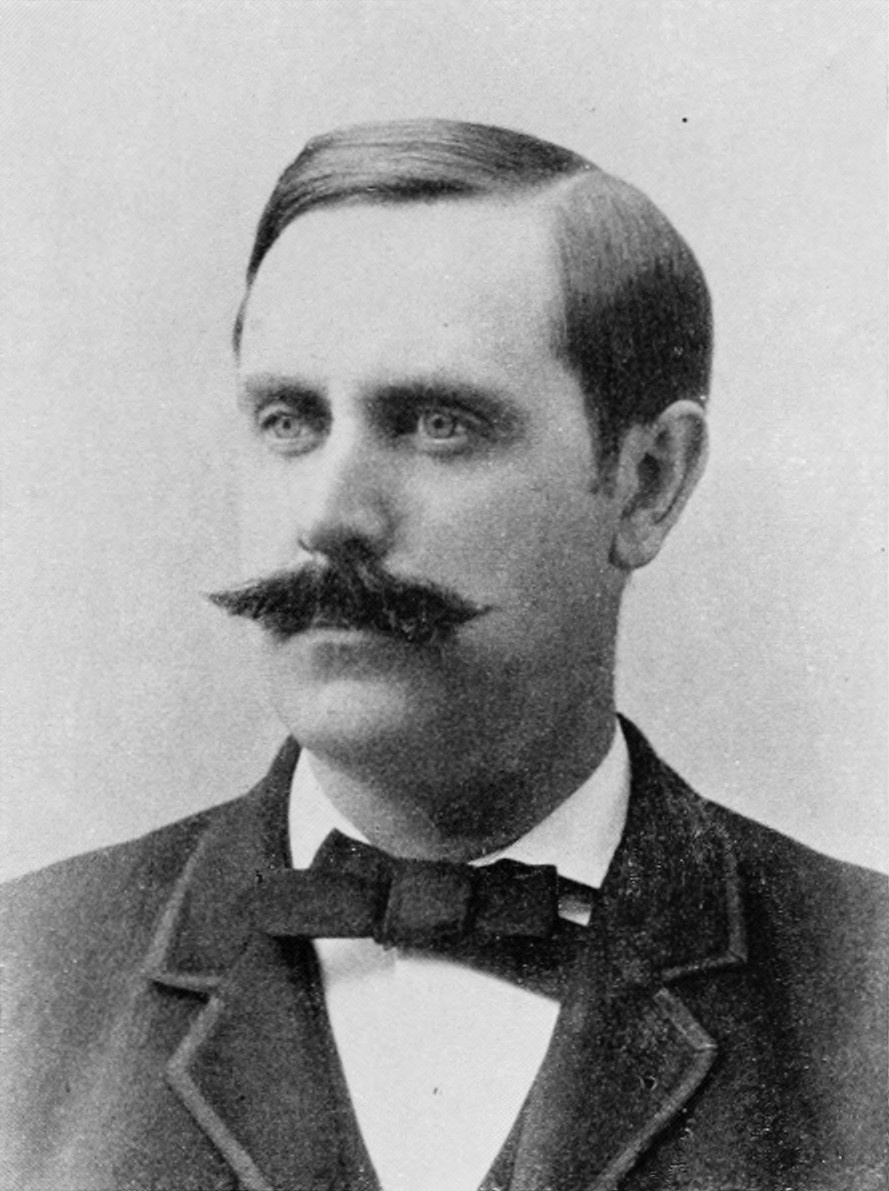

Member of the U.S. House of Representatives from Massachusetts's 12th district
- In office March 4, 1891 – March 3, 1893
- Preceded by: Francis W. Rockwell
- Succeeded by: Elijah A. Morse

Associate Justice of the Massachusetts Supreme Judicial Court
- In office December 31, 1913 – October 1, 1937

Associate Justice of the Massachusetts Superior Court
- In office January 25, 1905 – December 31, 1913

3rd Mayor of Pittsfield, Massachusetts
- In office 1894–1895
- Preceded by: Jabez L. Peck
- Succeeded by: Walter F. Hawkins

Member of the Massachusetts Senate
- In office 1888–1889

Member of the Massachusetts House of Representatives
- In office 1886–1887

Personal details
- Born: June 15, 1859 Sheffield, Massachusetts, U.S.
- Died: October 14, 1943 (aged 84) Pittsfield, Massachusetts, U.S.
- Party: Democratic
- Education: Eastman Business College; Boston University School of Law
- Profession: Lawyer

John Crawford Crosby (June 15, 1859 – October 14, 1943) was an American politician from the U.S. state of Massachusetts.

Crosby was born in Sheffield, Massachusetts. He attended the public schools of Pittsfield and graduated from Eastman Business College in Poughkeepsie, New York and from Boston University School of Law in Boston.

Crosby was admitted to the bar in 1882 and began practice in Pittsfield. He began his political career as a member of the school committee of Pittsfield from 1884 to 1890. During the later part of his service on the school committee, Crosby also served in the Massachusetts House of Representatives (1886–1887) and the Massachusetts Senate (1888–1889).

Crosby served as the director of a bank and later of fire and life insurance companies. He was elected in the 1890 election as a Democrat to the U.S. House of Representatives, representing Massachusetts's 12th district for the 52nd United States Congress (1891-03-04 to 1893-03-03).

Crosby lost his campaign for reelection in the 1892 election. He was elected Mayor of Pittsfield, serving from 1894 to 1895, and was a delegate to the 1896 Democratic National Convention.

Crosby was city solicitor from 1896 to 1900 and appointed a justice of the superior court on January 25, 1905, serving until December 31, 1913, when he was appointed justice of the Massachusetts Supreme Judicial Court. Crosby served on the court until his retirement on October 1, 1937. He died in Pittsfield on October 14, 1943, and was interred at Pittsfield Cemetery.

== See also ==
- 110th Massachusetts General Court (1889)

U.S. House of Representatives
Preceded by Francis W. Rockwell	Member of the U.S. House of Representatives from Massachusetts's 12th congressional district 1891-03-04 – 1893-03-03	Succeeded by Elijah A. Morse
Political offices
Preceded by Jabez L. Peck	Mayor of Pittsfield, Massachusetts; 1894–1895	Succeeded by Walter F. Hawkins
Party political offices
Preceded by Richard Olney II	Democratic nominee for Lieutenant Governor of Massachusetts; 1904	Succeeded by Henry Melville Whitney
Legal offices
Preceded by James Madison Morton Sr.	Associate Justice of the Massachusetts Supreme Judicial Court; December 31, 1913-October 1, 1937	Succeeded by Arthur Dolan
Preceded by	Associate Justice of the Massachusetts Superior Court; January 25, 1905–December 31, 1913	Succeeded by
