= Newburyport Public Library =

Library in Massachusetts, US

Coordinates: 42°48′45″N 70°52′40″W

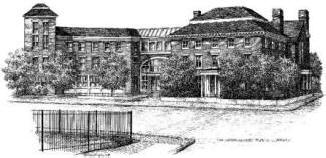
The architect's pencil sketch of Newburyport Public Library. The Tracy Mansion is visible to the viewer's right. Its main entrance, now leading to a reading room, is no longer used

Newburyport Public Library, in Newburyport, Massachusetts, was founded in September, 1854, by Josiah Little. It opened its doors to the public on September 5, 1855, in Ward Room 4 of the new City Hall. On that day its collection amounted to about 5750 books. Its operating budget depended at first on legacies and the generosity of private citizens. The library flourished.

== History ==
=== Earliest libraries of Newburyport ===
In 1794 a board of several interested citizens calling themselves the Newburyport Library Association established a circulating library, the Newburyport Library, in downtown Newburyport, advertising for subscribers. The booksellers had already been forming circulation libraries in their stores since before 1794 and these continued as adjuncts to the book-selling businesses.

=== The Tracy Mansion ===
A renovated and expanded 18th century Federalist mansion currently houses the Newburyport Public Library. In the period of the Revolutionary War it was among the most notable mansion of Newburyport, owned by the Tracys, the leading family of the times. The mansion was the concept of Patrick Tracy (1711, Wexford County, Ireland to 1789), who came from Ireland penniless and went to work as a sailor on ships built in Newburyport's shipyards. A successful mariner, he became a ship's officer, a navigator, a master and finally an owner. In the end he owned an import/export business utilizing fleets of ships, which made him very wealthy. His main interests outside of business, however, were St. Paul's Church, where he was a vestryman, and building the future City of Newburyport. He married Hannah Gookin, a minister's daughter. In 1751 his son, Nathaniel Tracy, was born. In due time he was sent to Harvard College, matriculating with the Class of 1769.

The Tracys were ardent supporters of the Patriot cause. In 1775 Nathaniel had constructed and outfitted the first Yankee privateer, and was so successful that a fleet of warships followed, all acting under letters of marque. He also built merchant ships and began buying property on the east coast of the colonies. It was said that he could journey by land to Philadelphia sleeping only in his own houses. In 1775 also he married Mary Lee, considered to be "a great beauty." Her father was elected to the first Continental Congress by Marblehead. For their wedding gift Patrick had constructed a new mansion on State Street (the center of the city), now the library.

After the formation of the United States, the vicissitudes of fortune turned against Nathaniel. The Continental Congress had unleashed a fleet of pirates against British commerce. Unencumbered by the war, the British moved to defend themselves. Most of the privateers had been lost through attrition in the war. The remaining vessels were detained in whatever port they were using for supply, the crews were imprisoned or impressed into the British Navy and the ships, unable to sail, were abandoned.

The merchant fleet fared no better. One of Nathaniel's agents had delivered a load of scrap masts to the French Navy, which was hoping to avail itself of solid American wood (such as the massive white pines still seen in Newburyport) and as a result Nathaniel's ships were blacklisted from European commerce. In addition, American ships were no longer protected as colonial by European treaties. The sentiment of foreign governments was that the new United States, although it could defend its own soil with French assistance, could not defend its interests abroad. All the powers of Europe joined in the plunder. American crews and cargoes were seized everywhere or delayed in port until their cargos spoiled. Americans became a special target of the Barbary Corsairs. In an ironic turn of events, they went into slavery in the Ottoman Empire along with over a million Europeans. Following George Washington's policy of avoiding foreign wars and entanglements, Congress paid a significant portion of the national budget to corsair states such as Tripoli, but to no avail. The outlook for Americans abroad did not improve until the new United States Navy sent squadrons carrying marines to the Mediterranean, in such conflicts as the First Barbary War, and elsewhere, defeated the British again in the War of 1812 and subsequently began to enforce the Monroe Doctrine.

These events in the rise of American sea power were far too late for Nathaniel Tracy: "... he found himself hopelessly involved in financial difficulties, owing large sums of money which he could not pay, and with the close of the War, his wealth vanished like smoke.... In 1786, he found himself bankrupt." His land assets were resold at a fraction of what he had paid for them. He finally retired to Spencer-Peirce-Little Farm in Newbury, Massachusetts, and died there. His eleven children and those of his brother and sister went on to found families from which many leading men and women of New England were to descend, including Supreme Court Justice Oliver Wendell Holmes.

The home in Newburyport did not then pass out of the family; it was taken over by Nathaniel's brother-in-law and former business partner, Jonathan Jackson, entering a new period of splendor. Among its visitors were the first president of the United States, George Washington, Lafayette, Talleyrand, Louis-Phillipe and others. When the family no longer had an interest in remaining there, they sold it as a hotel. Finally, now aging fast, it became a rooming-house. It was at this point that the subscribers to the new Newburyport Public Library expressed an interest in purchasing and renovating it.

=== Foundation of the library ===
The free public library, as the then new type of institution was beginning to be called, of Newburyport was conceived by Josiah Little, Charles Jackson and Samuel Swett as a circulation library with the fees paid by benefactors and the city. The citizens could then circulate the books for free. Little began with a donation of $5000, while Jackson and Swett followed suit with money and books. An agreement was drawn up with the City in which the three called themselves "the subscribers." They would provide the initial endowment while Newburyport, Newbury and West Newbury would pay a pro-rated portion of the operating expenses plus 1% per annum on the overhead. On November 20, 1854, the Mayor ordered the foundation of the "Public Library of the City of Newburyport" and the City Council, which had approved, passed an ordinance for its governing. The library opened on September 5, 1855.

The demand for books was so great that the directors began almost immediately seeking larger, better quarters, which would require more money. The means evaded them until 1860 when the Newburyport Lyceum agreed to sell tickets to lectures by persons of special invitation, who would do it for free, and donate the proceeds to the Library Building Fund. The lecturers were mainly ministers and academics. Over three seasons about $1000 was collected.

At this point Edward S. Moseley, a banker and one of the wealthiest men in Newburyport, placed himself and his friends on the subscription list. The names are familiar from today's streets and structures: the Hales, Cushings, Currier, Coffin, Forbes, Moulton, and so on, and others from as far away as New York and London. The fund soon expanded to about $20,000. The Tracy Mansion was for sale and was enthusiastically purchased as new home for the library. Any building converted for library use must be reinforced to bear the weight of the books. The Tracy home was totally redesigned, internally, externally and grounds, by Arthur Gilman of Boston, a native of Newburyport, "making no charge for his services." A time capsule was placed in a cornerstone, stating that the building was "free gift to the City." George W. Jackson, Jr., was mayor, and Hiram A. Tenney Librarian. The date was April 6, 1865.

The final deed of conveyance specified among other conditions that the building must be used "exclusively for the city library," and that it "shall not be open for public use on the Lord's Day." The Board of Aldermen accepted the gift by vote on September 4, 1865, and passed the appropriate ordinances.

== 21st century ==
In 2001, the Edward G. Molin wing was dedicated. As of December 2018, the library offers about 102,000 volumes to a service population of about 19,750. It is a member of the Merrimack Valley Library Consortium (MVLC), a network of 35 area libraries. Through resource sharing, Newburyport library card holders have access to over 3 million items owned by MVLC member libraries. Library staff assists in locating and requesting materials from other Massachusetts networks, as well as out-of-state libraries as necessary. The total circulation per year of NPL is about 250,000 items.

Manuscript holdings include materials related to local history, such as: Active Fire Society in Newburyport; Belleville Improvement Society; First Religious Society in Newburyport; General Charitable Society; Monday Evening Club; Newburyport Choral Union; Newburyport Female Charitable Society; Newburyport Lyceum; Newburyport Union Singing Society; Oak Hill Cemetery; and Second Presbyterian Church.

== See also ==
- Timothy Dexter

== Bibliography ==
- Newburyport, Massachusetts. Public Library. (1866), A statement of the proceedings resulting in the purchase of the Newburyport Public Library building, Newburyport: W. H. Huse, printers, OL 7061373M
- Report of the Free Public Library Commission of Massachusetts. v.1-8 (1891-1898)
- Currier, John James (September 1906). History of Newburyport, Mass., 1764-1905. Vol. 1. Newburyport, Mass.: The author.
- Lee, TA (1916–1917). "Nathaniel Tracy, Harvard, 1769". The Harvard Graduates' Magazine. XXV. Boston: The Harvard Graduates' Magazine Association.
