= William H. MacInnis =

American politician

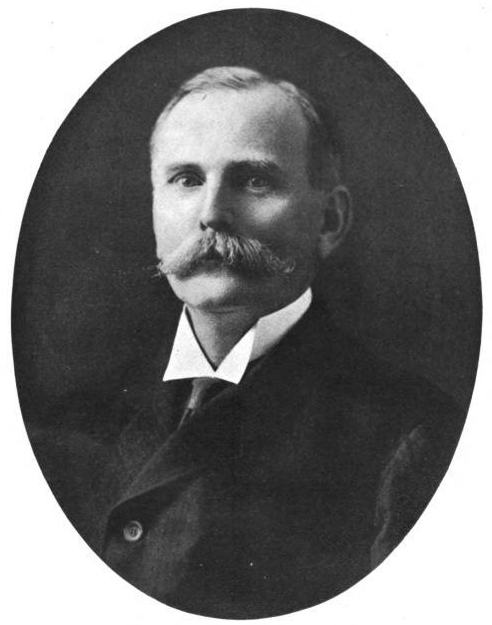

10th Mayor of Pittsfield, Massachusetts
- In office 1908–1910
- Preceded by: Allen H. Bagg
- Succeeded by: Kelton B. Miller

Member of the Massachusetts Senate Berkshire District
- In office 1904–1906

Personal details
- Born: November 22, 1860 Cape Breton, Nova Scotia
- Died: November 14, 1928 (aged 67) Dalton, Massachusetts
- Party: Democratic
- Profession: Cloak and Suit buyer

William Henry Havelock MacInnis (November 22, 1860 – November 14, 1928) was an American politician who served as a member of the Massachusetts Senate and Mayor of Pittsfield, Massachusetts.
