= George W. Faulkner =

American politician

George William Faulkner

Mayor of Pittsfield, Massachusetts
- In office January 4, 1915 – January 1916
- Preceded by: Patrick J. Moore
- Succeeded by: William C. Moulton

Personal details
- Born: January 24, 1874; Pittsfield, Massachusetts
- Died: February 20, 1944 (aged 70); Niagara Falls, New York

George William Faulkner (January 24, 1874 – February 20, 1944) was an American politician who served as Mayor of Pittsfield, Massachusetts.

== Notes ==
Political offices
Preceded by Patrick J. Moore	Mayor of Pittsfield, Massachusetts; 1916-1916	Succeeded by William C. Moulton
