= List of mayors of Pittsfield, Massachusetts =

This is a list of mayors of Pittsfield, Massachusetts. Pittsfield became a city in 1891.

#	Mayor	Picture	Term	Party
1	Charles E. Hibbard		1891–1892	Democratic
2	Jabez L. Peck		1892–1894	Republican
3	John Crawford Crosby		1894–1895	Democratic
4	Walter Foxcroft Hawkins		1896–1897	Republican
5	William W. Whiting		1898–1899	Democratic
6	Hezekiah S. Russell		1900–1901	Republican
7	Daniel England		1902–1902	Democratic
8	Harry Dwight Sisson		1903–1904	Republican
9	Allen H. Bagg		1905–1907	Republican
10	William H. MacInnis		1908–1910	Democratic
11	Kelton B. Miller		1911–1912	Republican
12	Patrick J. Moore		1913–1914	Democratic
13	George W. Faulkner		1915–1916	Republican
14	William C. Moulton		1917–1919	Republican
15	Louis A. Merchant		January 5, 1920 – January 3, 1921	Republican
16	Michael W. Flynn		January 3, 1921-January 1923	Democratic
17	Charles W. Power		1923–1924	Republican
18	Fred T. Francis		1925–1926	Republican
19	Harry Goodrich West		1927	Republican
20	Jay Preston Barnes		1928–1932	Democratic
21	Patrick J. Moore		1932–1933	Democratic
22	Allen H. Bagg		1934-1937 Republican	Republican
23	James Fallon		1938-1947	Democratic
24	Robert T. Capeless		1948–1956	Democratic
25	Harvey E. Lake		1956–1958	Republican
25	Remo Del Gallo		1965–1968	Democratic
26	Donald G. Butler		1968-1973	Republican
27	Evan Dobelle		1974-1976	Democratic
28	Paul E. Brindle III		1977-1979	Democratic
29	Charles L. Smith		1980-1987	Democratic
30	Anne Wojtkowski		1988-1991	Democratic
31	Edward M. Reilly		1992–1998	Democratic
32	Gerald S. Doyle Jr.		1998–2002	Democratic
33	Sara Hathaway		2002–2004	Democratic
34	James M. Ruberto		2004–2012	Democratic
35	Daniel Bianchi		2012–2016	Democratic
36	Linda M. Tyer		2016-2023	Democratic
37	Peter Marchetti		2024–Present	Democratic
