= Marsha Kazarosian =

American attorney

Marsha V. Kazarosian
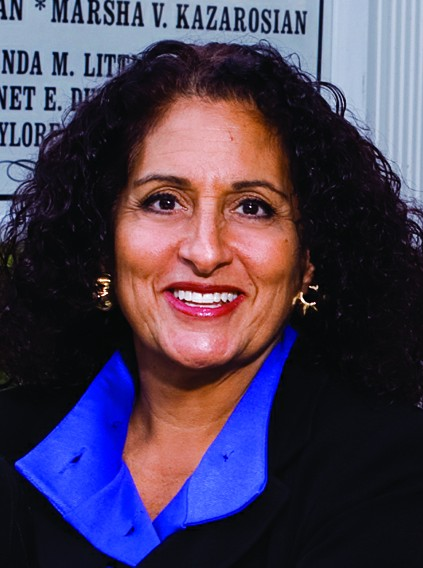
- Born: March 24, 1956 (age 70)
- Citizenship: American
- Education: Andover
- Alma mater: U. Mass at Amherst; Suffolk Law School in Boston
- Occupation: Lawyer
- Years active: 30+
- Parent(s): Paul Kazarosian; Margaret Kazarosian
- Awards: 2016 Circle of Excellence; Best Lawyers in America · Personal Injury · Family Law · Civil Rights; Super Lawyers (2006-present)
- Website: kazcolaw.com

Marsha V. Kazarosian (Armenian: Մարշա Ղազարոսյան) is an American attorney in Haverhill, Massachusetts notable for handling high-profile cases in the New England area. Her handling of a gender discrimination case involving a country club brought her national recognition. She represented one of the teenaged defendants in the 1990 murder of a young husband by his wife Pamela Smart, who conspired with her teenaged lover to murder her husband for insurance money; the story became the basis of the movie To Die For starring Nicole Kidman, and the television movie Murder in New Hampshire starring Helen Hunt. Her legal skill was the subject of a cover story entitled The Power of Marsha Kazarosian in a publication geared to the legal community.

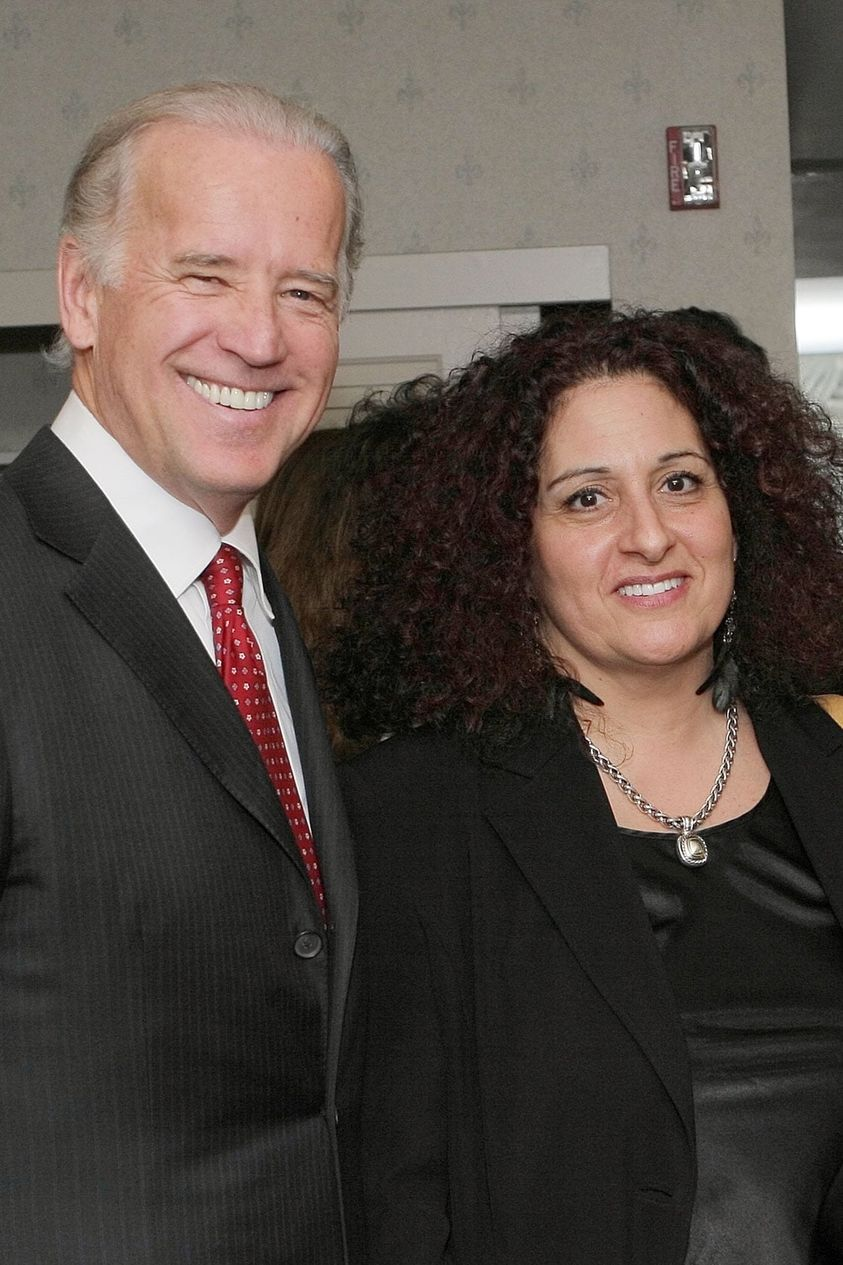
Joe Biden, then a U.S. senator from Delaware met with Kazarosian on March 24, 2006 at the Massachusetts Bar Association's Annual Gala in March. Biden was the keynote speaker for the event.

Kazarosian's law practice focuses on civil litigation, family law, discrimination personal injury, police brutality, gender discrimination, ethics in government, rape victims, sexual harassment, police misconduct, insurance issues, and general litigation. She has often appeared on local television discussing legal matters.

Kazarosian is the daughter of the late Armenian American lawyer Paul Kazarosian, and both of her parents were children of survivors of the 1915 Armenian genocide. Since the age of four, Marsha wanted to be a lawyer like her father. She graduated from Phillips Academy in 1974, the University of Massachusetts Amherst in 1978, and earned a J.D. degree from Suffolk University Law School in 1982.

In 1996, women members of the Haverhill Golf and Country Club were dissatisfied with its treatment of women regarding membership, tee time availability, and membership wait lists; Marsha Kazarosian represented them. It became a high-profile case reported in the national media in which opposing lawyers described her as a "barracuda attorney" according to Sports Illustrated. Kazarosian described how female club members felt excluded by the male-dominated club:

It's like an old high school football team that grew up together and moved to the country club. If you cross them, you're blacklisted...

— Marsha Kazarosian, in Sports Illustrated, in 1998

Kazarosian earned a $3.9 million financial judgment for the women plaintiffs, and the judgment was upheld by a state appeals court which reviewed the case. According to the New York Times, it was the first instance in which a state's public accommodations law was upheld by a state appeals court when applied to discrimination at a country club. In addition, Kazarosian has been an active leader in bar associations at the county and state levels. Her firm has offices in Haverhill and Salem.

Massachusetts Lawyers Weekly listed her as a top lawyer in New England, and she has been identified as a top Massachusetts attorney in the publication Super Lawyers for every year since 2006. In 2014, she was president of the Massachusetts Bar Association. Kazarosian serves on the Massachusetts Board of Bar Overseers, and she was appointed by the governor to serve on the Special Judicial Nominating Commission for the state's Supreme Judicial Court. In addition, she served on the campus council of the University of Massachusetts at Amherst. In 2021, she was appointed to serve as one of the two attorneys on the nine-member Peace Officer Standards and Training Commission, an advisory group brought into existence in 2020 by a Massachusetts police reform law.
