= Following Atticus =

2012 book by Thomas F. Ryan

- Author: Tom Ryan
- Publication date: August 7, 2012
- ISBN: 9-780-06199711-2

Following Atticus (full name: Following Atticus: Forty-Eight High Peaks, One Little Dog, and an Extraordinary Friendship), written by Thomas F. Ryan, is a 2012 book about a newspaper reporter (Ryan) and his relationship with his two dogs. The story is based in Newburyport, Massachusetts, and the White Mountains of New Hampshire, particularly the Four-thousand footers.

== Critical response ==
Boston Daily praised it for its lack of treacly sentiment and recommended it to dog lovers. Kirkus Reviews called it "lyrical" and mentioned the book's "immense pathos". However, the blog Cairn's of Life was less enthusiastic, accusing Ryan of abusing his dog through taking his pet on so many walks.
