= Charles E. Hibbard =

American lawyer

Charles Edmund Hibbard
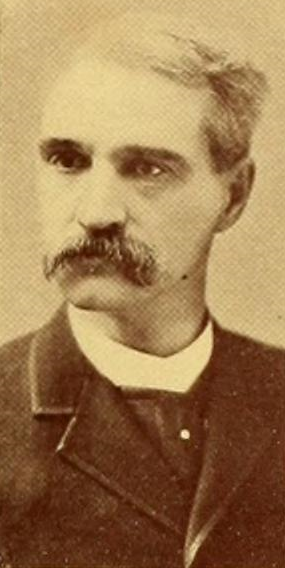

Delegate to the 1917 Massachusetts Constitutional Convention
- In office June 6, 1917 – August 13, 1919

Mayor of Pittsfield, Massachusetts
- In office 1891–1891
- Preceded by: Board of Selectmen
- Succeeded by: Jabez L. Peck

District Attorney for Hampden and Berkshire Counties, Massachusetts
- In office 1888–1893
- Preceded by: Andrew J. Waterman
- Succeeded by: Charles L. Gardner

Personal details
- Born: March 15, 1844 Farmington Falls, Maine, U.S.
- Died: August 11, 1922 Pittsfield, Massachusetts, U.S.
- Party: Democratic
- Spouse: Henrietta Hayden
- Children: Charles Lovejoy Hibbard; Mary Page Hibbard; Frederic Walbridge Hibbard
- Education: Phillips Andover, Amherst College

Charles Edmund Hibbard (March 15, 1844 – August 11, 1922) was an American lawyer, banker and politician who served as the Western Massachusetts District Attorney and as the first Mayor of Pittsfield, Massachusetts.

== Early life and education ==
Hibbard was born on March 15, 1844 in Farmington Falls, Maine, he attended Phillips Andover and graduated from Amherst College in 1867. After he graded from Amherst College Hibbard began his study of the law in the Woodstock, Vermont office of William Collamer. Hibbard later finished his course of legal study with William M. Rogers of Methuen, Massachusetts.

== Family life ==
On February 2, 1870 Hibbard married Henrietta Hayden in her hometown of Montpelier, Vermont, they had three children, Charles Lovejoy Hibbard and Mary Page Hibbard, and Frederic Walbridge Hibbard.

== Business career ==
=== Legal career ===
Hibbard was admitted to the Massachusetts Bar on April 21, 1869 however he first worked as a lawyer in Tama, Iowa after about two years in Iowa Hibbard moved to Boston, and then in 1881 moved to Lee, Massachusetts, finally in 1887 he moved to Pittsfield, Massachusetts.

=== Banking ===
In addition to his work as a lawyer, Hibbard was also involved in banking, he served as a trustee of the Lee Savings Bank, and as the president of the Berkshire Loan and Trust.

== Public service career ==
=== District Attorney ===
In 1884 Hubbard ran for the office of the District Attorney for the Western District (which consisted of Hampden and Berkshire Counties), he lost that election to Andrew J. Waterman. In 1887 Hibbard ran once again for the District Attorney position this time he won defeating his opponent Judge James R. Dunbar, Hibbard was reelected three years later defeating William H. Brooks, Hibbard served a total of six years as District Attorney.

=== Mayor of Pittsfield ===
In 1890 Hibbard was elected the first mayor of Pittsfield, Massachusetts, serving a one-year term in 1891.

=== 1917 Massachusetts Constitutional Convention ===
In 1916 the Massachusetts legislature and electorate approved a calling of a Constitutional Convention. Hibbard was elected as one of the representatives of the Massachusetts 1st First Congressional District to the Massachusetts Constitutional Convention of 1917.

=== Massachusetts Bar Association ===
Hibbard served as the president of the Massachusetts Bar Association in 1917.

== Death ==
Hibbard died in his apartment in Pittsfield, Massachusetts on August 11, 1922.

== Notes ==
Political offices
Preceded by Andrew J. Waterman	District Attorney for the Western District; 1888–1893	Succeeded by Charles L. Gardner
Preceded by Board of Selectmen	Mayor of Pittsfield, Massachusetts; 1891–1891	Succeeded by Jabez L. Peck
