= Charles Whittlesey Power House =

Historic house in Massachusetts, United States

- U.S. National Register of Historic Places
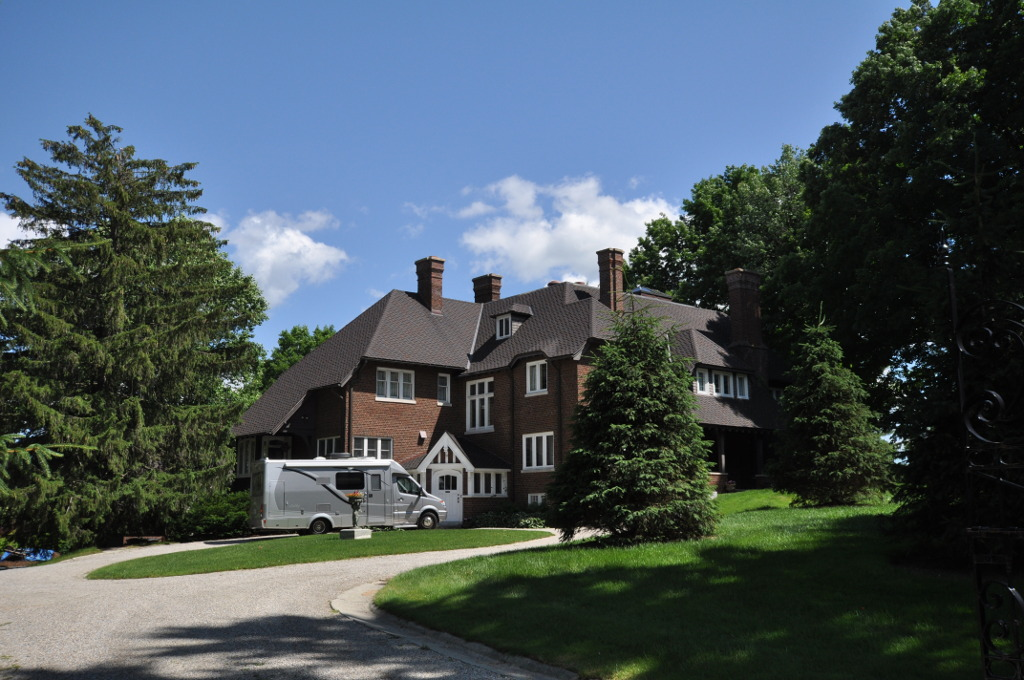

- Location within Massachusetts Location within the United States
- Location: Pittsfield, Massachusetts
- Coordinates: 42°25′44″N 73°15′21″W
- Area: 11.25 acres (4.55 ha)
- Built: 1912
- Architectural style: Tudor Revival
- NRHP reference No.: 97000820
- Added to NRHP: August 8, 1997

The Charles Whittlesey Power House is a historic house located at 575 South Street in Pittsfield, Massachusetts. Built about 1912, this Tudor Revival house and its landscaped setting are a rare local example of the country house style propounded by the English architect Edwin Lutyens. The house was built for Charles Whittlesey Power, a local businessman who also served one term as mayor of Pittsfield. It was listed on the National Register of Historic Places on August 8, 1997.

== Description and history ==
The Power House stands south of downtown Pittsfield on the east side of South Street (United States Route 20), on more than 11 acres (4.5 ha) just north of the Pittsfield Country Club. It is a rambling 2 1/2-story brick structure, set on a granite foundation that is fully exposed on the eastern side due to the sloping lot. It is roughly L-shaped, with a landscaped circular drive providing access to the house at the crook of the L. Its exterior is characterized by a variety of dormers, projecting and recessed sections, and varying window sizes and shapes. The interior has Federal style fireplace mantels, and includes a basement-level billiard room with a quarry tile floor. A garage is attached, and there is a secondary automobile barn on the property.

The house was built about 1912 for Charles Wittlesey Power, a local businessman who also served one term as mayor of Pittsfield. The style and setting of the house are rare in Pittsfield, although was not uncommon in other areas. Although its architect is unknown, its location and setting follow principles promoted by the English architect Edwin Lutyens, who designed many English country houses.

== See also ==
- National Register of Historic Places listings in Berkshire County, Massachusetts
