= Market Square Historic District (Newburyport, Massachusetts) =

Historic district in Massachusetts, United States

- U.S. National Register of Historic Places
- U.S. Historic district
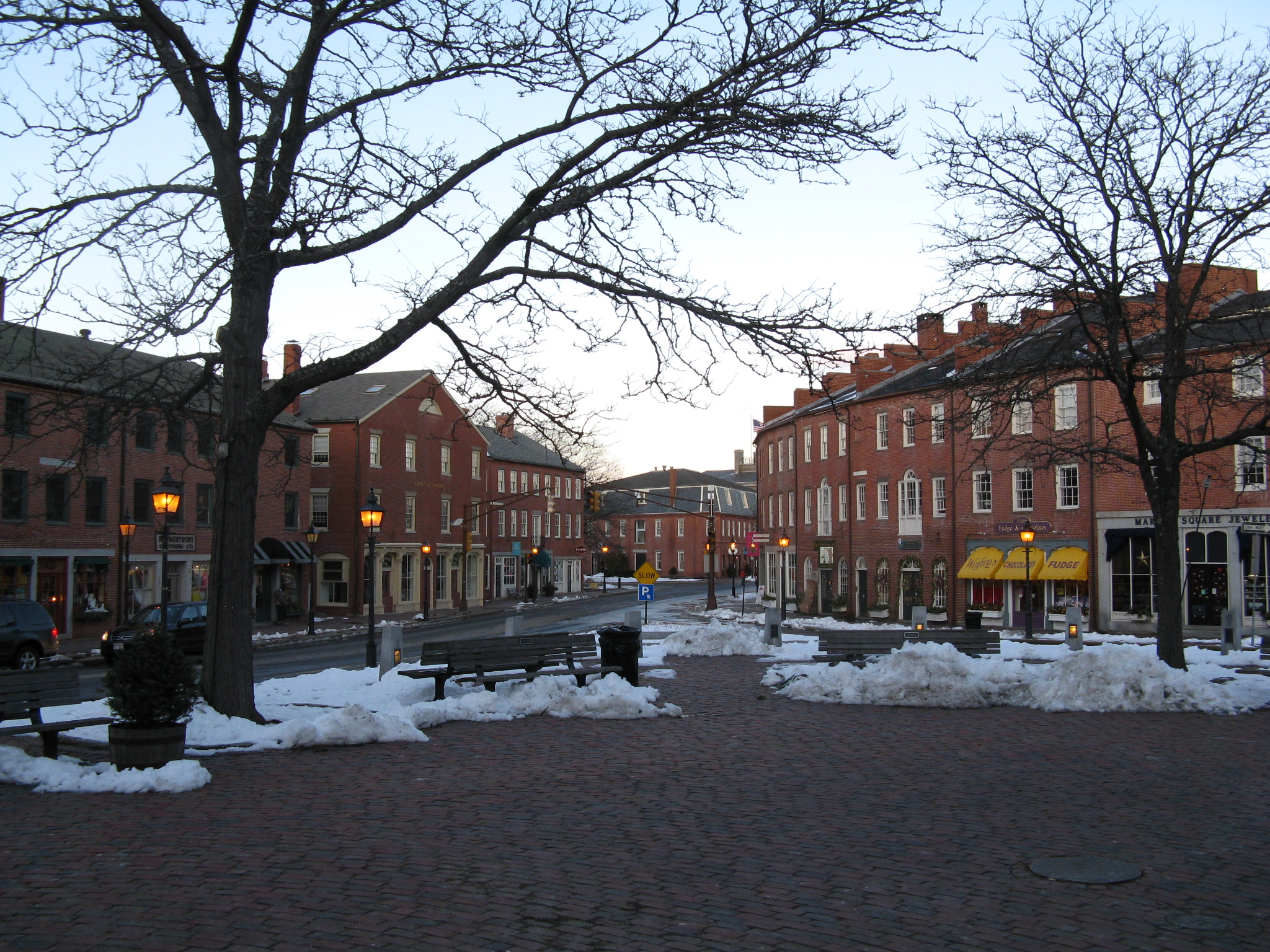
- Market Square

- Location within Massachusetts Location within the United States
- Location: Newburyport, Massachusetts
- Coordinates: 42°48′40″N 70°52′13″W
- Built: 1811
- Architectural style: Federal
- NRHP reference No.: 71000088
- Added to NRHP: February 25, 1971

The Market Square Historic District of Newburyport, Massachusetts encompasses an area of the city near the Merrimack River that was completely rebuilt after a major fire in 1811. Over the next twenty years the area was rebuilt under a building code requiring either brick construction or size limits on wood-frame buildings. As a consequence the Market Square area has a remarkable concentration of Federal style brick buildings.

Among the most notable are the Custom House, now a museum, and the 1823 Market House, which forms the district's eastern boundary. The district includes Market Square and properties fronting on State, Merrimac, Liberty, and Water Streets. It was listed on the National Register of Historic Places in 1971.

== See also ==
- National Register of Historic Places listings in Essex County, Massachusetts
