= Charles W. Power =

American businessman and politician

Charles Whittlesey Power

Mayor of Pittsfield, Massachusetts
- In office 1923–1924
- Preceded by: Michael W. Flynn
- Succeeded by: Fred T. Francis

Personal details
- Born: Charles Whittlesey; August 1, 1869 Pittsfield, Massachusetts
- Died: 1960
- Party: Republican

Charles Whittlesey Power was an American businessman and politician who served as Mayor of Pittsfield, Massachusetts.

Powers house, Charles Whittlesey Power House, is listed in the National Register of Historic Places.

== Notes ==
Political offices
| Preceded by Michael W. Flynn | Mayor of Pittsfield, Massachusetts; 1923–1924 | Succeeded by Fred T. Francis |
