= Patrick J. Moore =

American politician

Patrick James Moore

Member of the Massachusetts House of Representatives 2nd Berkshire District
- In office 1913–1914

Mayor of Pittsfield, Massachusetts
- In office 1913–1914
- Preceded by: Kelton B. Miller
- Succeeded by: George W. Faulkner

Member of the Pittsfield, Massachusetts Board of Aldermen

Member of the Pittsfield, Massachusetts Common Council

Personal details
- Born: December 22, 1863 Holyoke, Massachusetts
- Died: March 10, 1936 (aged 72) Pittsfield, Massachusetts
- Party: Democratic
- Profession: Attorney

Patrick James Moore (December 22, 1863 – March 10, 1936) known as "P.J.", was an American politician who served as a member of the Massachusetts House of Representatives, as well as a member of the Common Council, Alderman, and Mayor of Pittsfield, Massachusetts.

He died in 1936.

== See also ==
- 1931–1932 Massachusetts legislature

== Notes ==
Political offices
Preceded by Kelton B. Miller	Mayor of Pittsfield, Massachusetts; 1913–1914	Succeeded by George W. Faulkner
