= Amesbury High School =

Location
- 5 Highland St. Amesbury, Massachusetts 01913
- Coordinates: 42°51′5″N 70°56′32″W

Information
- Type: Public; Open enrollment
- Established: c. 1870
- Principal: Danielle Ricci
- Grades: 9–12
- Enrollment: 481 (2024–2025)
- Campus type: Suburban
- Colors: Red and white
- Athletics conference: Cape Ann League (CAL)
- Mascot: Red Hawks
- Rival: Newburyport High School
- Newspaper: AHS Weekly
- Yearbook: Powwow
- Website: https://ahs.amesburyma.gov/

Amesbury High School is a coeducational public high school in the city of Amesbury, Massachusetts, serving as the primary high school for students from Amesbury and, South Hampton, New Hampshire, along with also drawing some students from other parts of the lower Merrimack Valley region.

It is in the Amesbury Public Schools district, and serves grades 9 through 12. The school mascot was the Indians, the colors are red and white. The yearbook is called the Powwow. There are around 620 students, and almost 60 members of faculty and other staff.

== History ==
Amesbury High School was originally housed in what is now called the Ordway building on School Street. A wooden school building built in 1882 served as its first permanent home. The growing school was allowed to expand in a new brick building built in 1917 and was designed by the Boston architecture firm Prescott & Sidebottom. That building served as a high school until a fire destroyed it on April 7, 1964. At the time, plans were underway to build a replacement for the school, which had exceeded its 500-student capacity by 100. After a lengthy discussion, a new school was to be built on Highland Street, designed by Walter Scott Brodie of Kilham, Hopkins, Greeley & Brodie of Boston. This school would have a capacity of 900 students. On September 28, 1969, the new school was dedicated. From 1964 until the 1969 opening of the new building, classes were held in nearby Haverhill, in that city's former high school building (Haverhill High School itself having recently moved to a newly-constructed building).

== Athletics ==
Amesbury High School competes in the Cape Ann League. Their teams wear red and white and their athletic director is Glen Gearin.

The annual Thanksgiving game between Amesbury High School and Newburyport High School is one of the oldest high school football rivalries in the country, dating back to 1891.

== Graduates ==
Major General Frank D Merrill, famous for commanding the 5307th Composite Unit (Provisional), better known as "Merrill's Marauders," in the China-Burma-India Theater of WWII was a graduate of Amesbury High School.

Author and historian Osmond Richard Cummings graduated in 1940.

Paramount executive and film producer Jon Gould graduated from Amesbury High School in 1971.

The USA Network show Burn Notice stars Jeffrey Donovan, a graduate of Amesbury High School. In 2009, Donovan visited Amesbury High and started a scholarship of $10,000 for an aspiring art student who plans to major in a fine arts career program in college. The scholarship will be given out to one student every year until 2018.
