= Allen H. Bagg =

American politician

Allen Henry Bagg
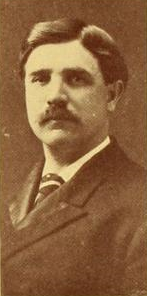

Mayor of Pittsfield, Massachusetts
- In office January 2, 1905 – 1907
- Preceded by: Harry D. Sisson
- Succeeded by: William H. MacInnis
- Majority: 206

President of the Pittsfield, Massachusetts Board of Aldermen
- In office January 4, 1904 – January 2, 1905

Member of the Pittsfield, Massachusetts Board of Aldermen Ward Four
- In office January 4, 1904 – January 2, 1905
- Majority: 282

Personal details
- Born: April 4, 1867; Pittsfield, Massachusetts
- Died: August 16, 1942 (aged 75); Pittsfield, Massachusetts
- Political party: Republican
- Spouse: Mary Campbell Clapp

Allen Henry Bagg (April 4, 1867 - August 16, 1942) was an American politician who served on the Pittsfield, Massachusetts Board of Aldermen, twice as Mayor of Pittsfield, Massachusetts, and, from 1933 to 1934, as the 3rd Vice President of Rotary International.

== Biography ==
He was born on April 4, 1867, in Pittsfield, Massachusetts. He died on August 16, 1942.

== Municipal offices ==
=== Board of Aldermen ===
From January 4, 1904, to January 2, 1905, Bagg served as a member and the president of the Pittsfield, Massachusetts Board of Aldermen.

=== Mayor of Pittsfield ===
In the city election of December 6, 1904, Bagg was elected mayor in a three-way contest, receiving a majority of 206 votes over his closest opponent, Bagg was mayor of Pittsfield, Massachusetts, from 1905 to 1907.

== Notes ==
Political offices
Preceded by Harry D. Sisson	Mayor of Pittsfield, Massachusetts; 1905–1907	Succeeded by William H. MacInnis
