= Louis A. Merchant =

American politician

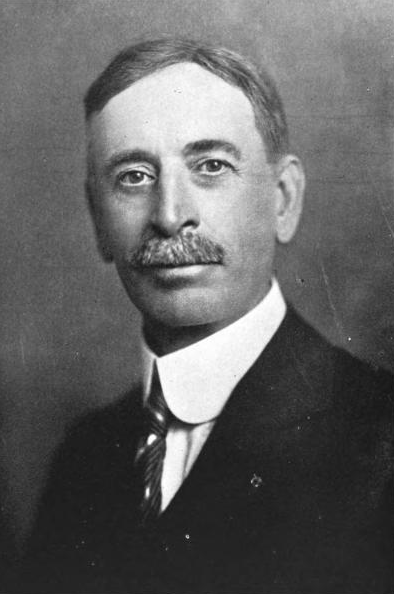

Mayor of Pittsfield, Massachusetts
- In office 1900–1901

Member of the Pittsfield, Massachusetts Common Council Ward Six
- In office 1899–1899

Personal details
- Born: January 18, 1860 Amenia, New York
- Died: January 21, 1950 (aged 90) Shrewsbury, Massachusetts
- Occupation: Clerk

Louis Albert Merchant (January 18, 1860 – January 21, 1950) was an American politician who served as Mayor of Pittsfield, Massachusetts.

Merchant was employed as a clerk.

In 1899 Merchant represented ward six on the Pittsfield Common Council.

== Notes ==
Political offices
Preceded by	Mayor of Pittsfield, Massachusetts	Succeeded by
