= United States Customhouse (Newburyport, Massachusetts) =

- U.S. Customhouse
- U.S. National Register of Historic Places
- U.S. Historic district – Contributing property
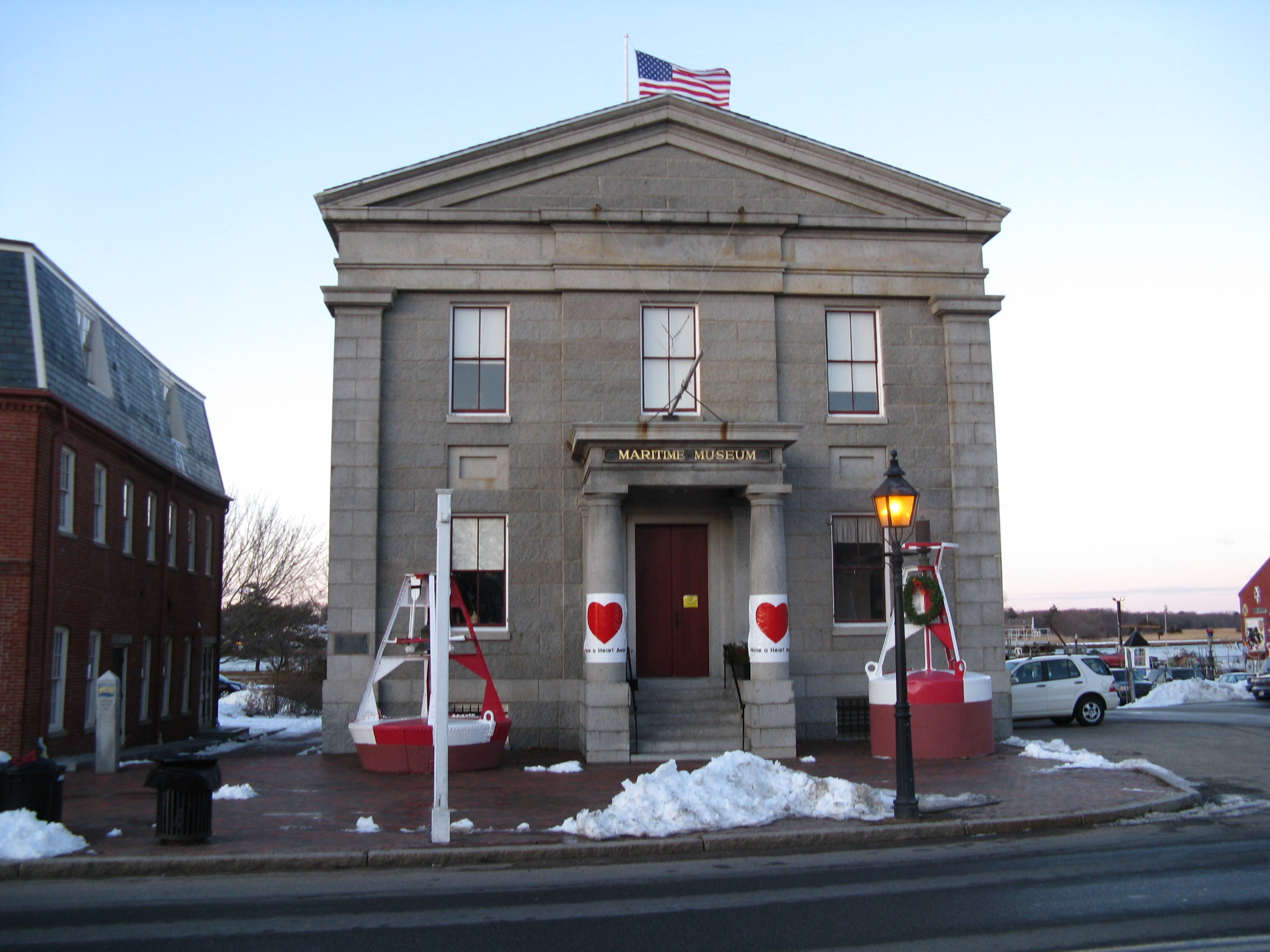
- U.S. Customhouse

- Location within Massachusetts Location within the United States
- Location: Newburyport, Massachusetts
- Coordinates: 42°48′44″N 70°52′9″W
- Built: 1834
- Architect: Robert Mills
- Architectural style: Classical Revival
- Part of: Market Square Historic District (#71000088); Newburyport Historic District (#84002411)
- NRHP reference No.: 71000089

Significant dates
- Added to NRHP: February 25, 1971
- Designated CP: February 25, 1971; August 2, 1984

The former United States Customhouse (now the Custom House Maritime Museum) is a historic building at 25 Water Street in Newburyport, Massachusetts.

The Classical Revival-style building was constructed in 1834 and served a custom house until Newburyport declined in popularity as a major port. The Newburyport Maritime Society, Inc. operates the Custom House Maritime Museum to showcase the maritime heritage of the Merrimack Valley. The building was added to the National Register of Historic Places in 1971. It is also a contributing element to the Market Square Historic District (also listed in 1971), and the Newburyport Historic District (listed in 1984).

== See also ==
- National Register of Historic Places listings in Essex County, Massachusetts
- List of maritime museums in the United States
