= Massachusetts Bar Association =

American state bar association

- Founded: 1911 (Incorporation)
- Type: Bar Association
- Location: Boston, Massachusetts, U.S.
- Region served: Law
- Website: www.massbar.org

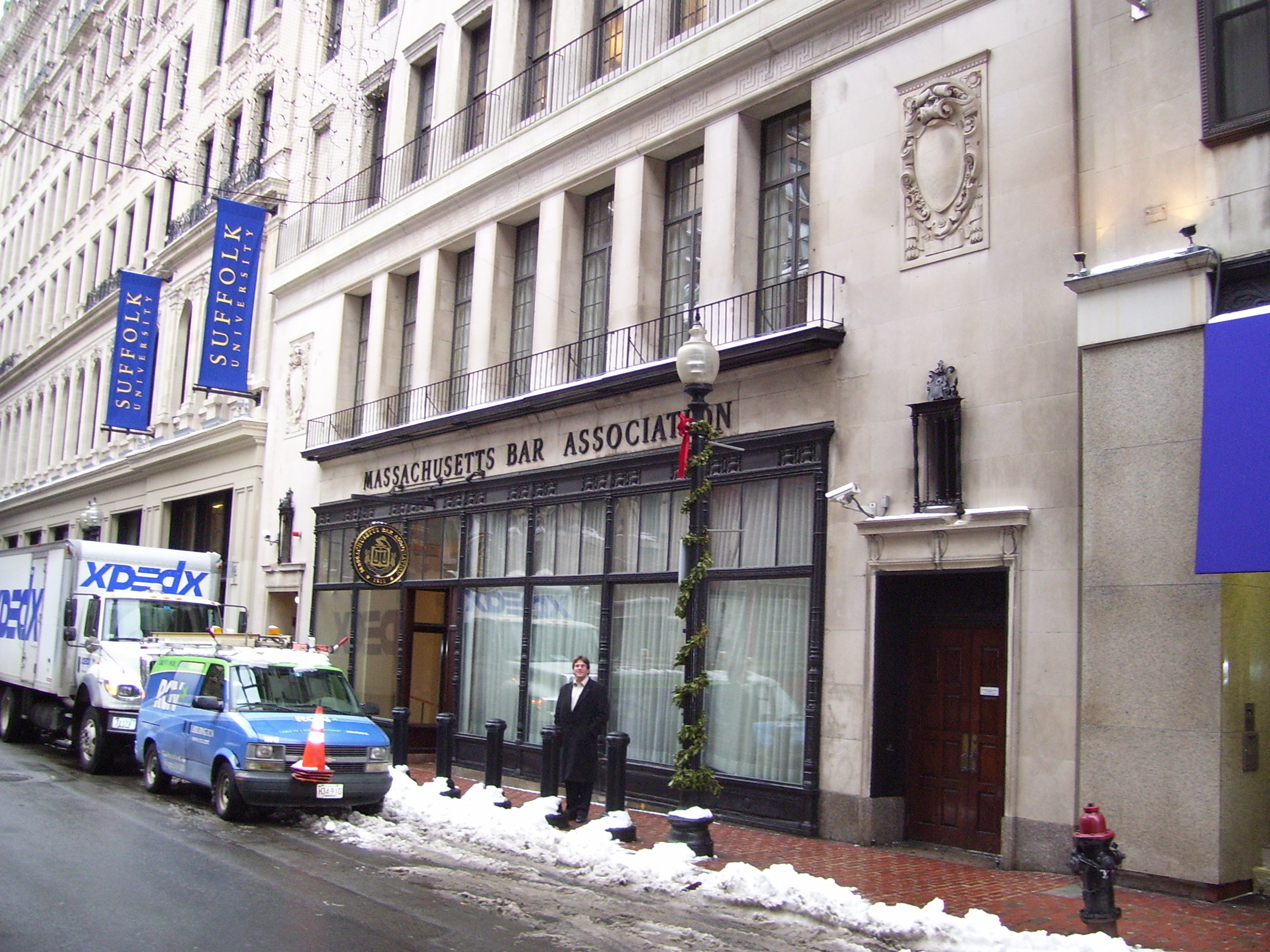
Massachusetts Bar Association building on West Street in Boston

The Massachusetts Bar Association (MBA) is a voluntary, non-profit bar association in Massachusetts with a headquarters on West Street in Boston's Downtown Crossing. The MBA also has a Western Massachusetts office.

The purpose of the MBA is to serve the legal profession and the public by promoting the administration of justice, legal education, professional excellence, and respect for the law. The MBA represents a diverse group of attorneys, judges, and legal professionals across the commonwealth.

== History ==
After the Massachusetts Bar Association was organized in 1909 as a voluntary Association, it was incorporated in 1911.

Of its members in 1911, historian Lee M. Friedman (1871–1957).

In 1951, the Law Society of Massachusetts merged with the Massachusetts Bar Association.

== Membership ==
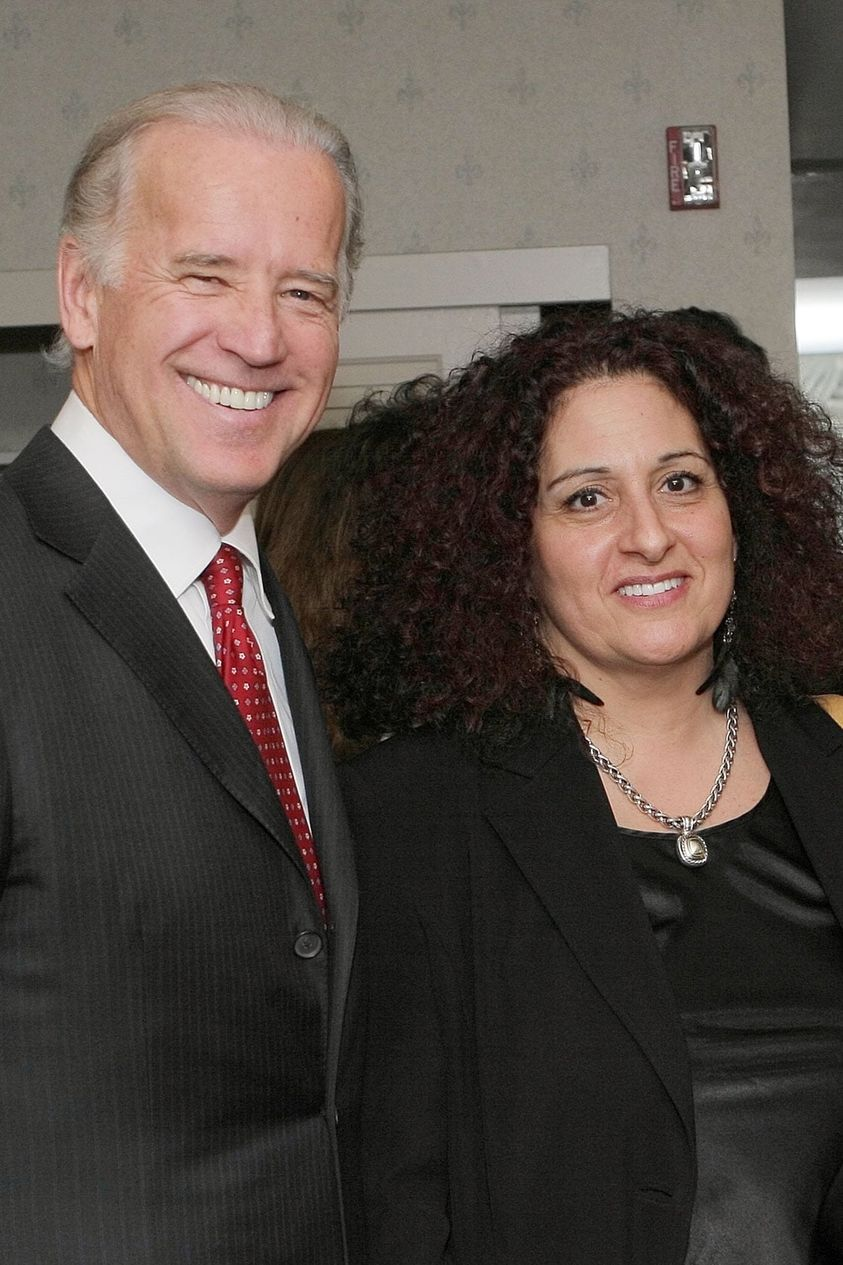
The Massachusetts Bar Association holds an annual gala in March. In 2006, Joe Biden, then the United States senator from Delaware, was the keynote speaker. He met with lawyers including Marsha Kazarosian (in photo).

Any member of the Bar of the Commonwealth of Massachusetts in good standing may become a member of the Association. Only members may vote and hold office in the Association.

Membership dues vary depending on how long an attorney has practiced, with special consideration given to particular areas of law, including legal services attorneys.

Any member of the MBA who has been admitted to the bar for 50 years, and is a current member in good standing shall automatically become a life member of the MBA and be exempt from paying annual dues.

== Presidents ==
Presidents
1st	Richard Olney	1909–1910
2nd	Alfred Hemenway	1910–1911
3rd	Charles W. Clifford	1911–1912
4th	John C. Hammond	1912–1913
5th	Moorfield Storey	1913–1914
6th	Herbert Parker	1914–1915
7th	Henry N. Sheldon	1915–1916
8th	Charles E. Hibbard	1916–1917
9th	Arthur Lord	1917–1918
10th	John W. Cummings	1918–1919
11th	Frederick Perry Fish	1919–1920
12th	Edward H. Hutchins	1920–1921
13th	Addison L. Green	1921–1922
14th	Thomas Hovey Gage	1922–1923
15th	Thomas W. Proctor	1923–1924
16th	George L. Mayberry	1924–1925
17th	Franklin G. Fessenden	1925–1926
18th	George R. Nutter	1926–1927
19th	Frederick Mansfield	1928–1931
20th	Fred N. Wier	1931–1932
21st	Nathan P. Avery	1932–1936
22nd	Henry R. Mayo	1936–1939
23rd	Joseph Wiggin	1939–1941
24th	Mayo A. Shattuck	1941–1944
25th	Edward O. Proctor	1944–1947
26th	Louis Cox	1947–1948
27th	Richard Wait	1948–1950
28th	Samuel P. Sears	1950–1953
29th	Robert W. Bodfish	1953–1955
30th	Joseph Schneider	1955–1957
31st	Raymond W. Barrett	1957–1959
32nd	Gerald P. Walsh	1959–1960
33rd	Harold Horvitz	1960–1962
34th	Laurence H. Lougee	1963–1963
35th	Livingston Hall	1963–1964
36th	Walter H. McLaughlin	1964–1966
37th	Paul A. Tamburello	1966–1968
38th	Philip L. Sisk	1968–1970
39th	Richard K. Donahue	1970–1972
40th	Berge C. Tashjian	1972–1973
41st	Fred Fisher	1973-1974
42nd	Charles J. Kickham Jr.	1974–1975
43rd	Charles Y. Wadsworth	1975–1976
44th	Paul R. Sugarman	1976–1977
45th	Raymond J. Kenney Jr.	1977–1978
46th	Roy A. Hammer	1978–1979
47th	Wayne Budd	1979–1980
48th	Richard D. Gelinas	1980–1981
49th	Thomas J. Wynn	1981–1982
50th	Daniel O. Mahoney	1982–1983
51st	William E. Bernstein	1983–1984
52nd	Richard G. Hoffman	1984–1985
53rd	Michael S. Greco	1985–1986
54th	Alice E. Richmond	1986–1987
55th	John M. Callahan	1987–1988
56th	Thomas F. Maffei	1988–1989
57th	Charles B. Swartwood III	1989–1990
58th	Leo V. Boyle	1990–1991
59th	Daniel C. Crane	1991–1992
60th	Elaine M. Epstein	1992–1993
61st	Michael E. Mone	1993–1994
62nd	Kay H. Hodge	1994–1995
63rd	James S. Dilday	1995–1996
64th	Kenneth J. Vacovec	1996–1997
65th	Marylin A. Beck	1997–1998
66th	Camille F. Sarrouf	1998–1999
67th	Jefferey L. McCormick	2000–2001
68th	Edward P. Ryan Jr.	2001–2002
69th	Carol A. G. DiMento	2001–2002
70th	Joseph P. J. Vrabel	2002–2003
71st	Richard C. Van Nostrand	2003–2004
72nd	Kathleen M. O'Donnell	2004–2005
73rd	Warren F. Fitzgerald	2005–2006
74th	Mark D. Mason	2006–2007
75th	David W. White Jr.	2007–2008
76th	Edward W. McIntyre	2008–2009
77th	Valerie A. Yarashus	2009–2010
78th	Denise Squillante	2010–2011
79th	Richard P. Campbell	2011–2012
80th	Robert L. Holloway Jr.	2012–2013
81st	Douglas K. Sheff	2013–2014
82nd	Marsha Kazarosian	2014–2015
83rd	Robert W. Harnais	2015–2016
84th	Jeffrey N. Catalano	2016–2017
85th	Christopher P. Sullivan	2017–2018
86th	Christopher A. Kenney	2018–2019
87th	John J. Morrissey	2019–2020
88th	Denise I. Murphy	2020–2021
89th	Thomas M. Bond	2021–2022
90th	Grace V.B. Garcia	2022–present

== See also ==
- Law Society of Massachusetts
