= Robert Gray Dodge =

American lawyer and civic leader (1872–1964)

- c. 1918
- Born: July 29, 1872; Newburyport, Massachusetts, US
- Died: February 15, 1964 (aged 91); Boston, Massachusetts, US
- Education: Harvard Law School
- Occupation: Lawyer

Robert Gray Dodge (July 29, 1872 – February 15, 1964) was an American lawyer and civic leader who practice law in Boston, Massachusetts, for 67 years. As one of the founders of the Massachusetts Bar Association, established in 1909, he was known among his peers as "dean of the Massachusetts Bar". He was an active member of the Massachusetts Judicial Council since it was founded, served on the council of the American Law Institute, and was a member of the United States Supreme Court Advisory Committee on the Rules of Civil Procedure for 21 years.

== Early life and education ==
At Harvard, c. 1893

Dodge was born in Newburyport, Massachusetts. He graduated summa cum laude from Harvard College in 1893, and from Harvard Law School in 1897, and was editor in chief of the Harvard Law Review.

== Career ==
Dodge taught property and contract law at Harvard Law School for two years. In 1898, he taught property law to the first class at what became Northeastern University Law School.

Known among peers as "the dean of the Massachusetts bar", Dodge was a founder of the Massachusetts Bar Association in 1909. He later served as president of the Boston Bar Association from 1931 to 1934.

As a senior partner of the law firm Palmer, Dodge, Gardner and Bradford, Dodge participated in many high-profile cases during his career. He served as defense counsel for an anti-trust suit against United Fruit Company, as well as a suit involving directors of Gillette.

In the early 1920s, he was one of the special assistant attorney generals in the high-profile case against Suffolk County district attorney Joseph C. Pelletier, who was removed from office after being charged with corruption. Dodge later represented the Boston Bar Association in petitioning for the disbarmentof Pelletier and his co-conspirator Daniel H. Coakley.

He was chairman of the board of trustees of Wellesley College for 17 years, also chairman of the trustees of Northeastern University for 20 years until 1959.

== Honors and accolades ==
He held honorary Doctor of Laws degrees from NU and from Tufts College. The Northeastern University campus library, built in 1959, is named in his honor. He was a member of the US Supreme Court Advisory Committee of Civil Procedure, and served on the board and executive committee of the New England Conservatory of Music. He was elected to the American Academy of Arts and Sciences in 1938.

== Personal life ==
Dodge bought the Greenwood Farm in 1916 as a summer retreat for his family. He died at his home in Boston on February 15, 1964, and was survived by his three daughters.
