= Newburyport High School =

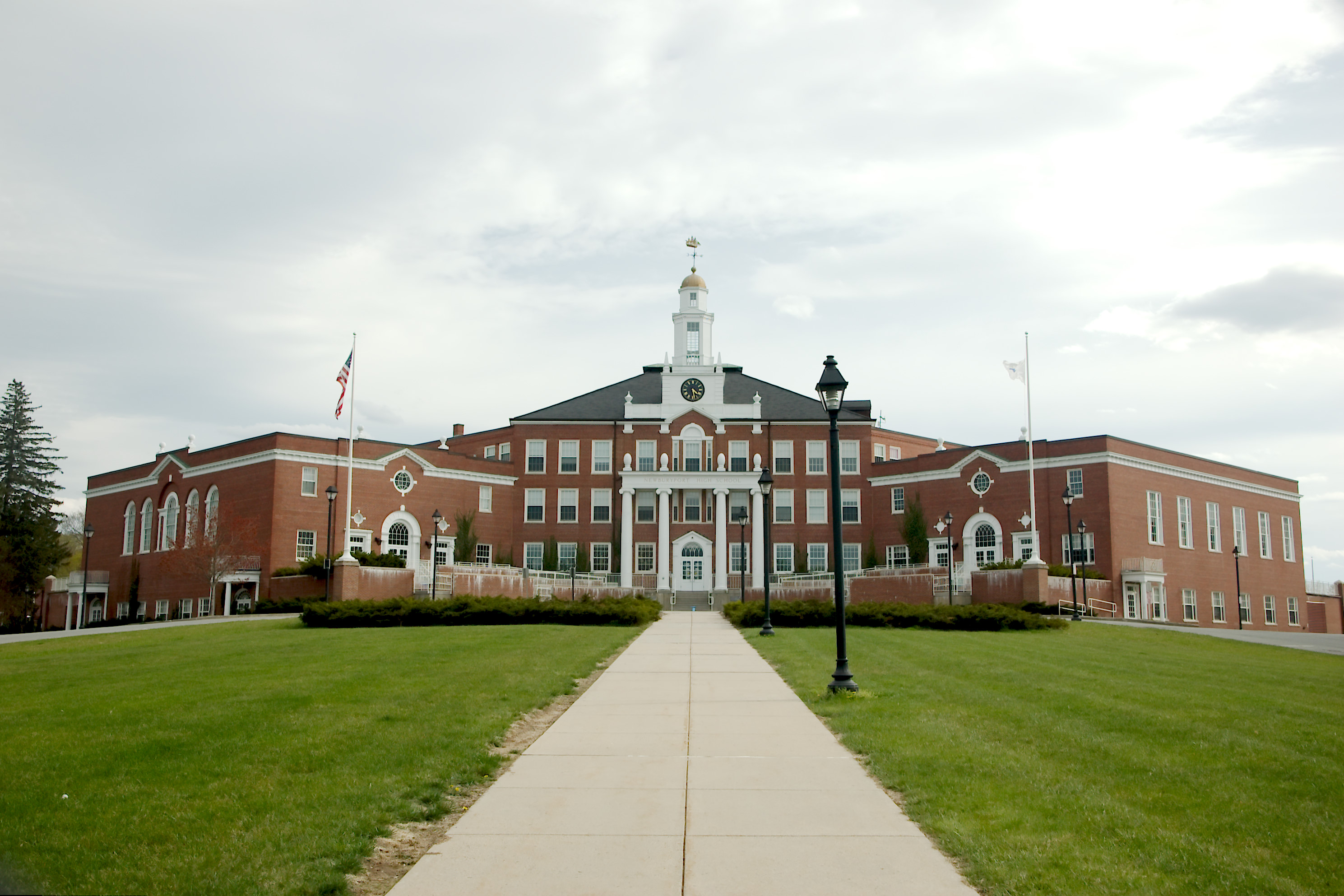

Location
- 241 High Street; Newburyport, Massachusetts 01950; United States
- Coordinates: 42°48′47″N 70°53′10″W

Information
- School type: Public High School
- Established: 1831
- Status: Open
- School district: Newburyport Public Schools
- CEEB code: 221510
- Principal: Andrew Wulf
- Faculty: ~100
- Teaching staff: 70.90 (FTE)
- Grades: 9–12
- Gender: Co-Ed
- Enrollment: 785 (2023–2024)
- Student to teacher ratio: 11.07
- Campus type: Suburban
- Colors: Crimson; Old Gold
- Song: "Alma Mater"
- Athletics conference: Cape Ann League
- Mascot: Clipper Ship
- Team name: Newburyport Clippers
- Rival: Amesbury High School
- Accreditation: New England Association of Schools and Colleges
- Publication: Record Magazine
- Newspaper: Masthead
- Yearbook: En-Aitch-Ess (NHS)
- Building designer: Edwin S. Dodge
- Website: nhs.newburyport.k12.ma.us

Newburyport High School (NHS) is a public high school serving students in ninth through twelfth grades in Newburyport, Massachusetts, United States and is part of the Newburyport Public School System. It was established in 1831 and is one of the oldest public schools in the United States of America.

== History ==
In 1868, the Latin and English High School (1831), later called the Brown High School (1851); the Putnam Free School (1838); and the Female High School (1843) merged to form the Consolidated High and Putnam School. In 1889, the name changed to Newburyport High School.

The current site of Newburyport High School was purchased from Alice Atkinson in 1935, and the deed was recorded at the Southern Essex County Registry of Deeds as Book 3030, Page 279 in March 1935.

== Extracurricular activities ==
=== Athletics ===
Newburyport High School competes in the Cape Ann League in several interscholastic sports.

- Fall sports
  - Cross Country
  - Field Hockey
  - Football
  - Golf
  - Soccer
  - Volleyball
- Winter sports
  - Ice Hockey
  - Indoor Track
  - Ski Racing
  - Basketball
- Spring sports
  - Baseball
  - Lacrosse
  - Softball
  - Tennis
  - Track & Field

== Notable alumni ==
- Kate Bolick, author
- Charles R. Cross, physicist
- Harry Curtis, former MLB player (New York Giants)
- Georgia Dabritz, former artistic gymnast, Utah Red Rocks team member.
- Angelo Dagres, former MLB player (Baltimore Orioles)
- Joe Keery, actor
- John Phillips Marquand, Pulitzer Prize winning author
- Chet Nourse, former MLB player (Boston Red Sox)
- Lothrop Withington, genealogist and victim of the Lusitania sinking
