= Kate Bolick =

American author, editor, and journalist

Kate Bolick (born 1972) is the author of New York Times bestseller Spinster: Making a Life of One's Own and a lecturer in English at Yale University. Previously, she was a contributing editor for The Atlantic,, executive editor of Domino magazine, and host of "Touchstones at The Mount," an annual literary interview series at Edith Wharton’s country estate in the Berkshires.

Bolick attended Colby College and New York University.

== Career ==
Kate Bolick is most well known as the author of New York Times bestseller Spinster: Making a Life of One's Own. In addition to her work with The Atlantic, Bolick contributes writing to Elle,Cosmopolitan, Vogue, The New York Times, and The Wall Street Journal, among other publications. Previously, Bolick was the executive editor of Domino, as well as a columnist for The Boston Globe's Ideas Section.

Bolick's appearances include The Today Show, CBS Sunday Morning, CNN, Fox News, MSNBC, and NPR programs around the country.

She teaches at Yale University.

=== Spinster: Making a Life of One's Own ===
In her 2015 New York Times Bestselling book, Bolick asks and answers a question she posed in a 2011 cover story for The Atlantic: "How does a woman move through life alone?" Heather Havrilesky, writing in The New York Times, gave the book a positive review, saying that "what Spinster actually offers is an idiosyncratic journey through Bolick's decades-long exploration of how to live independently, with cues from an assortment of nontraditional women."
