= Kelton B. Miller =

American journalist & politician (1860–1941)

Kelton Bedell Miller
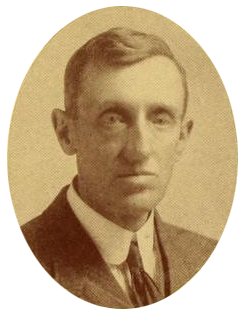

11th Mayor of Pittsfield, Massachusetts
- In office 1911–1912
- Preceded by: William H. MacInnis
- Succeeded by: Patrick J. Moore

Personal details
- Born: September 8, 1860 New Baltimore, New York
- Died: December 2, 1941 (aged 81) Pittsfield, Massachusetts
- Party: Republican
- Spouse: Amy Bess Miller
- Children: Marjorie E. Miller, d. January 1937; Lawrence K. Miller, d. March 1991; Evelyn Miller Burbank, d. January 2003
- Profession: Journalist

Kelton Bedell Miller (September 8, 1860 – December 2, 1941) was an American journalist and politician who served as Mayor of Pittsfield, Massachusetts. Miller was the owner and publisher of The Berkshire Eagle for 47 years. The Miller Building, built in 1912 in Pittsfield, Massachusetts, and now home to The Berkshire County Juvenile Court, is named after Kelton Miller.

Miller was born in New Baltimore, New York to Henry Stephen and Antoinette (Bedell) Miller on September 8, 1860. He married Anna Marie Bouck and they had three children together. Anna died, age 26, on September 22, 1887. Miller later remarried Eva Hallenback in 1893 and they had additional children. One of Miller's sons, Lawrence K. Miller, became the editor and publisher of The Berkshire Eagle newspaper. One of his grandsons, also named Kelton Miller, was publisher of the Bennington Banner from 1977 until 1995.

Political offices
Preceded by William H. MacInnis	11th Mayor of Pittsfield, Massachusetts; 1911–1912	Succeeded by Patrick J. Moore
