= Rufus Sargent =

American architect

- Born: January 7, 1812; Amesbury, Massachusetts
- Died: November 1, 1886 (aged 74); Palatka, Florida
- Occupation: Architect

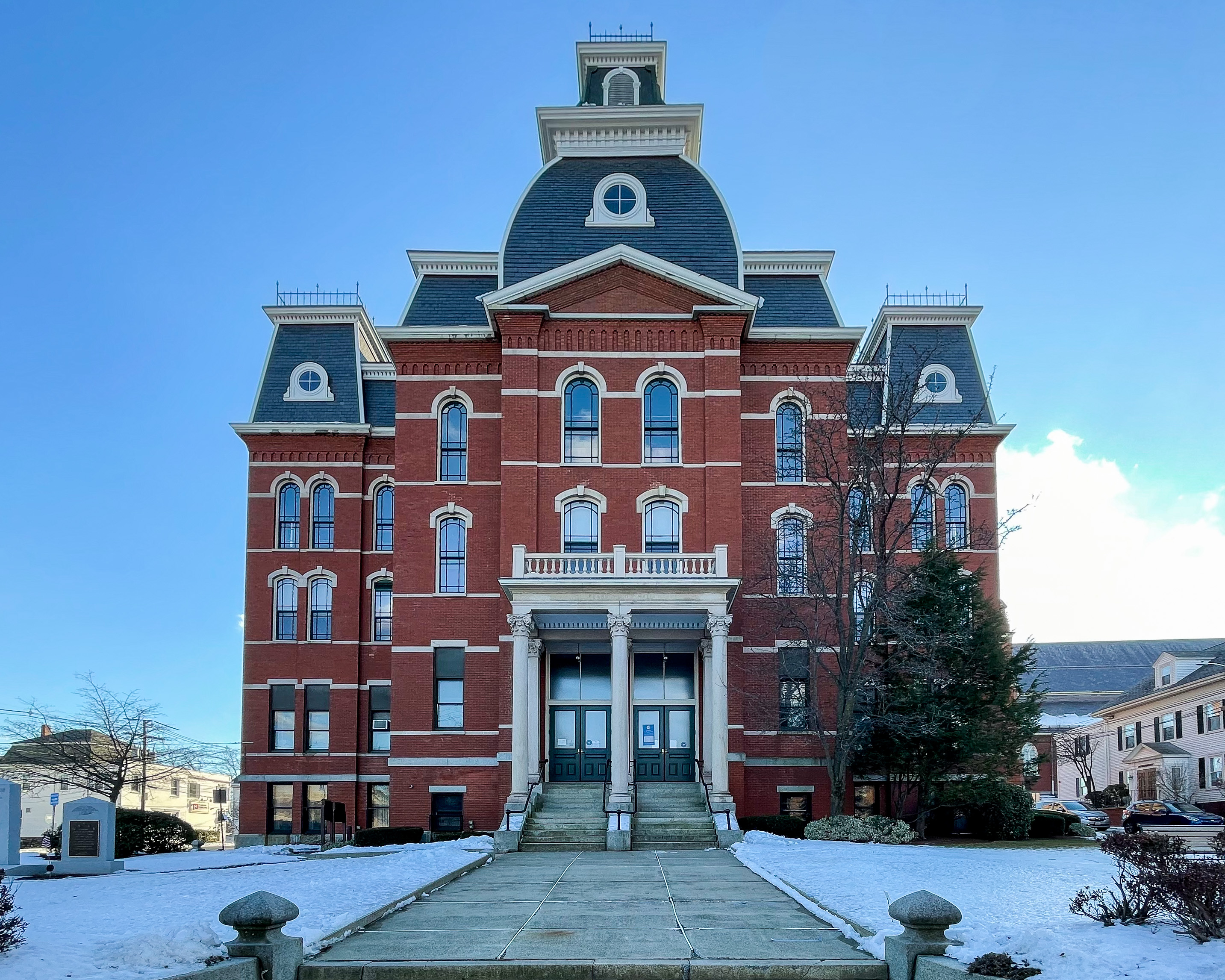
Peabody City Hall, designed by Rufus Sargent in 1882 and completed in 1883.

Rufus Sargent (1812-1886) was an American architect practicing in Newburyport, Massachusetts during the nineteenth century.

== Life and career ==
Rufus Sargent was born January 7, 1812, in Amesbury, Massachusetts to Nicholas Sargent and Sally (Currier) Sargent. In 1840 he moved to Newburyport, where he first worked as a carpenter. By 1843 he had formed a partnership with Henry Morse which lasted only briefly. By 1848 he was calling himself an architect rather than carpenter, and would also advertise services as a civil engineer in later years. Sargent was the most prominent architect practicing in Newburyport and Essex County during his lifetime, and after the Civil War also built extensively in New Hampshire. In the Spring of 1886 he moved south to Palatka, Florida, possibly for his health. While there he worked as an architect for the Henry B. Plant-affiliated Florida Southern Railway, and died there in 1886.

Sargent was consulting engineer for the Newburyport City Railroad, completed in 1872. His major buildings include the First Baptist Church of Methuen (1869, Gothic Revival), the bank for the Institution for Savings in Newburyport (1871, Italianate) and the City Hall of Peabody (1882–83, Second Empire).

== Personal life ==
Sargent was a descendant of William Sargent, an early settler of Amesbury in the 1630s.

In 1835, while still living in Amesbury, Sargent married Abigail Buswell of Northfield, New Hampshire. They had two daughters. After living in various houses around Newburyport for most of his life, including 3 Fruit Street, in 1877 Sargent purchased land at 8 Harris Street, where he built his own house in the Italianate style. His family continued to live there after his death. Sargent died November 1, 1886, in Palatka. He was buried in Newburyport.

== Legacy ==
Sargent's buildings were designed in the popular styles of the Victorian era, especially the Italianate and Second Empire styles. They contrast with the earlier architecture of Newburyport, a city best known for its Federal architecture.

At least three of Sargent's works have been listed on the United States National Register of Historic Places, and others contribute to listed historic districts.

== Architectural works ==
- House for Nathan Poor, (Note: A contributing property to the Newburyport Historic District, NRHP-listed in 1984.) Newburyport, Massachusetts (1843)
- First Presbyterian Church remodeling, Newburyport, Massachusetts (1848)
- House for Charles H. Coffin, Newburyport, Massachusetts (1851, burned 1894)
- House for Ebenezer Sutton, Peabody, Massachusetts (1854, altered)
- St. Anna's Chapel of St. Paul's Episcopal Church, Newburyport, Massachusetts (1862–63)
- Ocean House, Rye Beach, New Hampshire (1863–65, burned 1873)
- House for Ebenezer Sutton, Center Harbor, New Hampshire (1865)
- North Andover Town Hall, North Andover, Massachusetts (1867, demolished 1954)
- Eben Dale Sutton addition to the Peabody Institute Library, Peabody, Massachusetts (1867–69, NRHP 1973)
- House for Henry C. Moses, Exeter, New Hampshire (1868, NRHP 1985)
- Robinson Female Seminary, Exeter, New Hampshire (1868, burned 1961)
- First Baptist Church, Methuen, Massachusetts (1869, NRHP 1984)
- West School, Peabody, Massachusetts (1869, demolished 1955)
- Institution for Savings Building, Newburyport, Massachusetts (1871)
- Center School, North Andover, Massachusetts (1872, demolished 1952)
- Kelley School (former), Newburyport, Massachusetts (1872)
- Merrill Block, (Note: A contributing property to the Exeter Waterfront Commercial Historic District, NRHP-listed in 1980.) Exeter, New Hampshire (1873–74)
- Newburyport Five Cents Savings Bank Building, Newburyport, Massachusetts (1874)
- Immaculate Conception R. C. School, Newburyport, Massachusetts (1879, demolished)
- Simpson addition to the Newburyport Public Library, Newburyport, Massachusetts (1881–82)
- Peabody City Hall, (Note: A contributing property to the Peabody Civic Center Historic District, NRHP-listed in 1980.) Peabody, Massachusetts (1882–83, NRHP 1972)
- Essex County Jail addition, Salem, Massachusetts (1884–85)
- House for Sherman Conant, (Note: A contributing property to the Palatka South Historic District, NRHP-listed in 1983. It is now an inn.) Palatka, Florida (1886)

== Gallery of architectural works ==
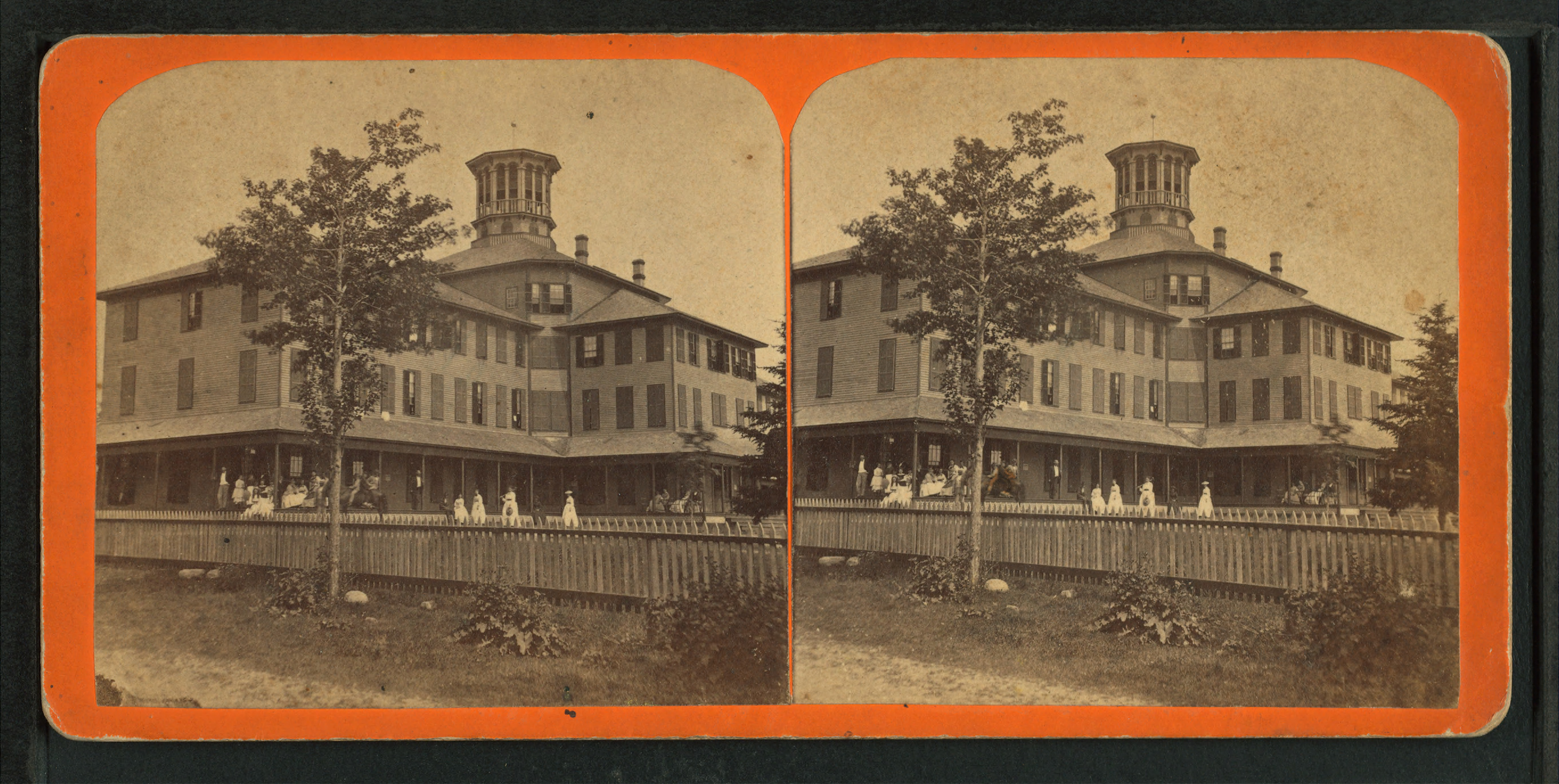
Ocean House, Rye Beach, New Hampshire, 1863-65.

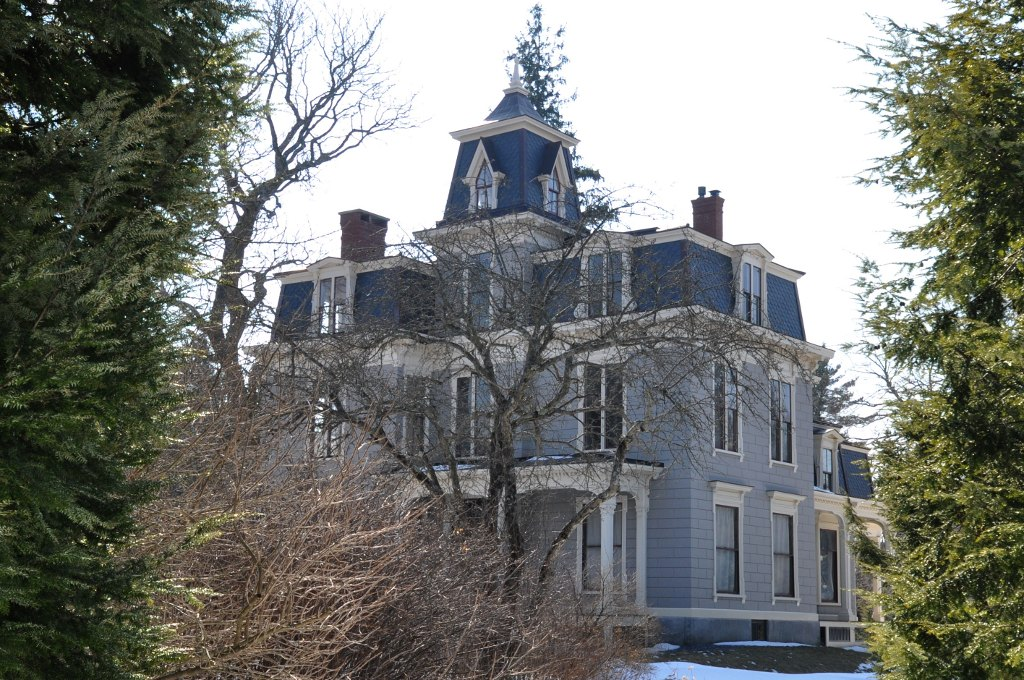
House for Henry C. Moses, Exeter, New Hampshire, 1868.

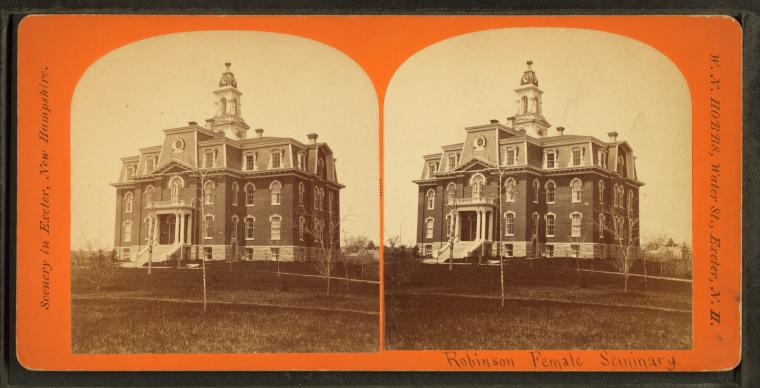
Robinson Female Seminary, Exeter, New Hampshire, 1868.

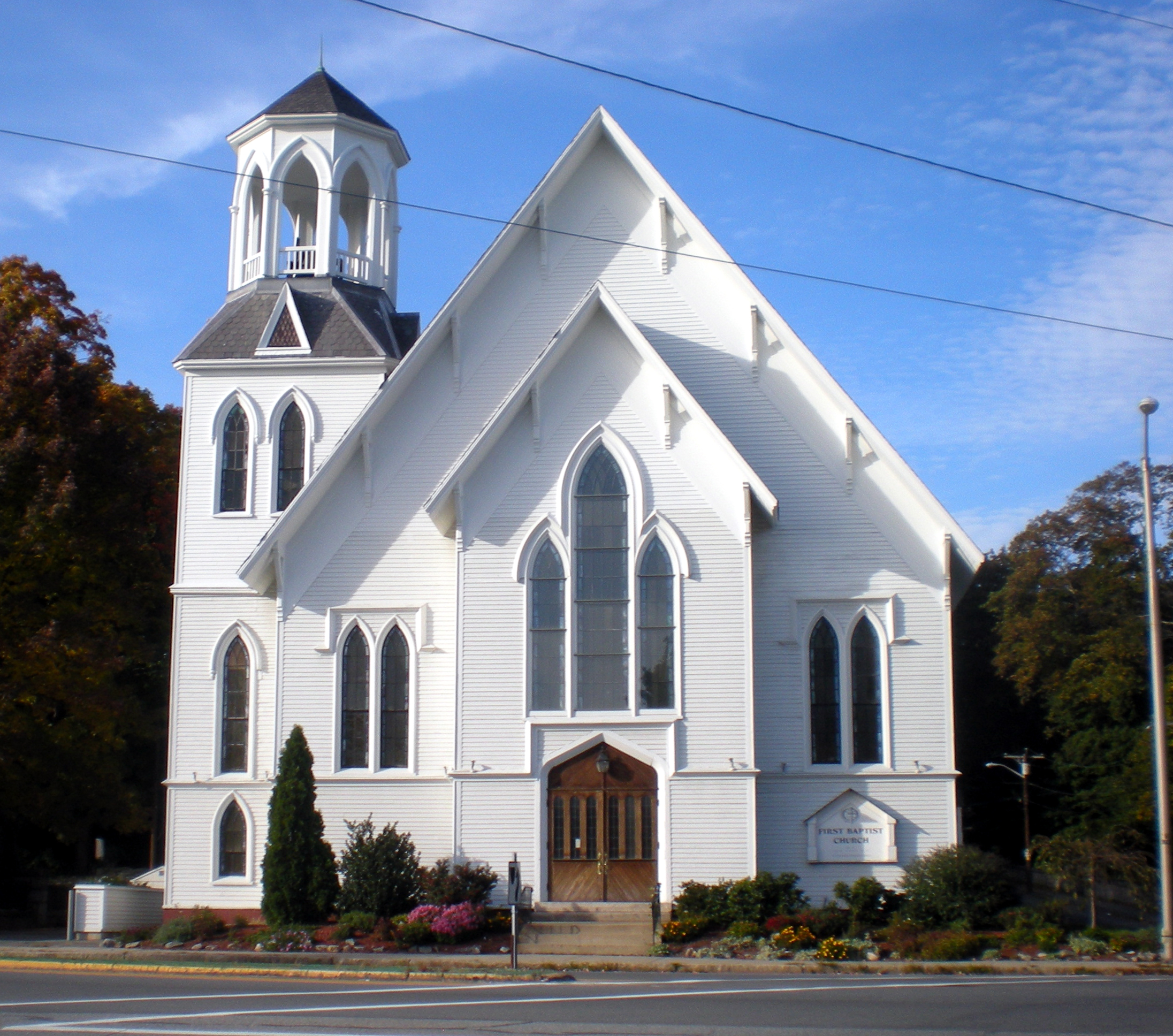
First Baptist Church, Methuen, Massachusetts, 1869.

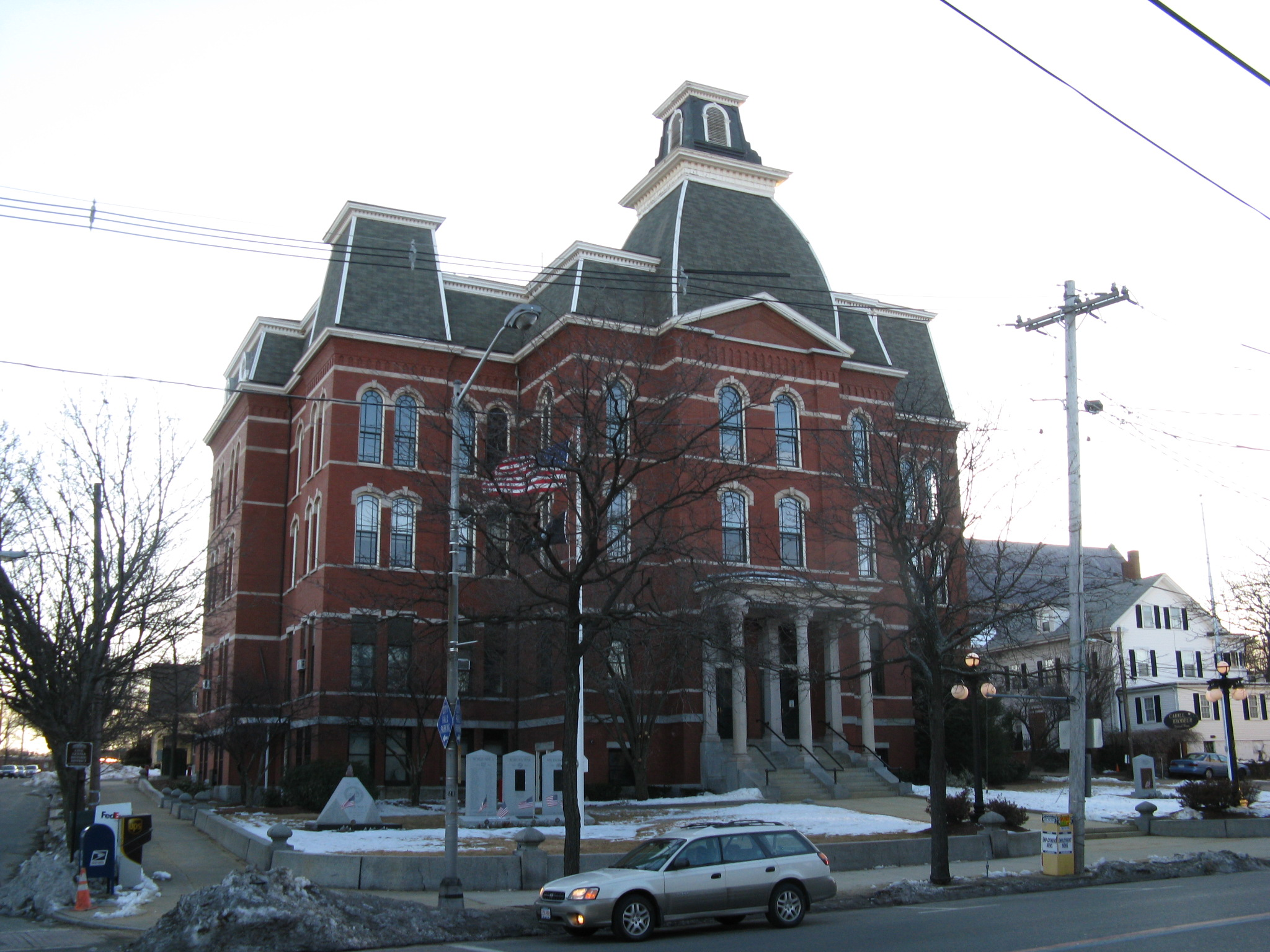
Peabody City Hall, Peabody, Massachusetts, 1882-83.

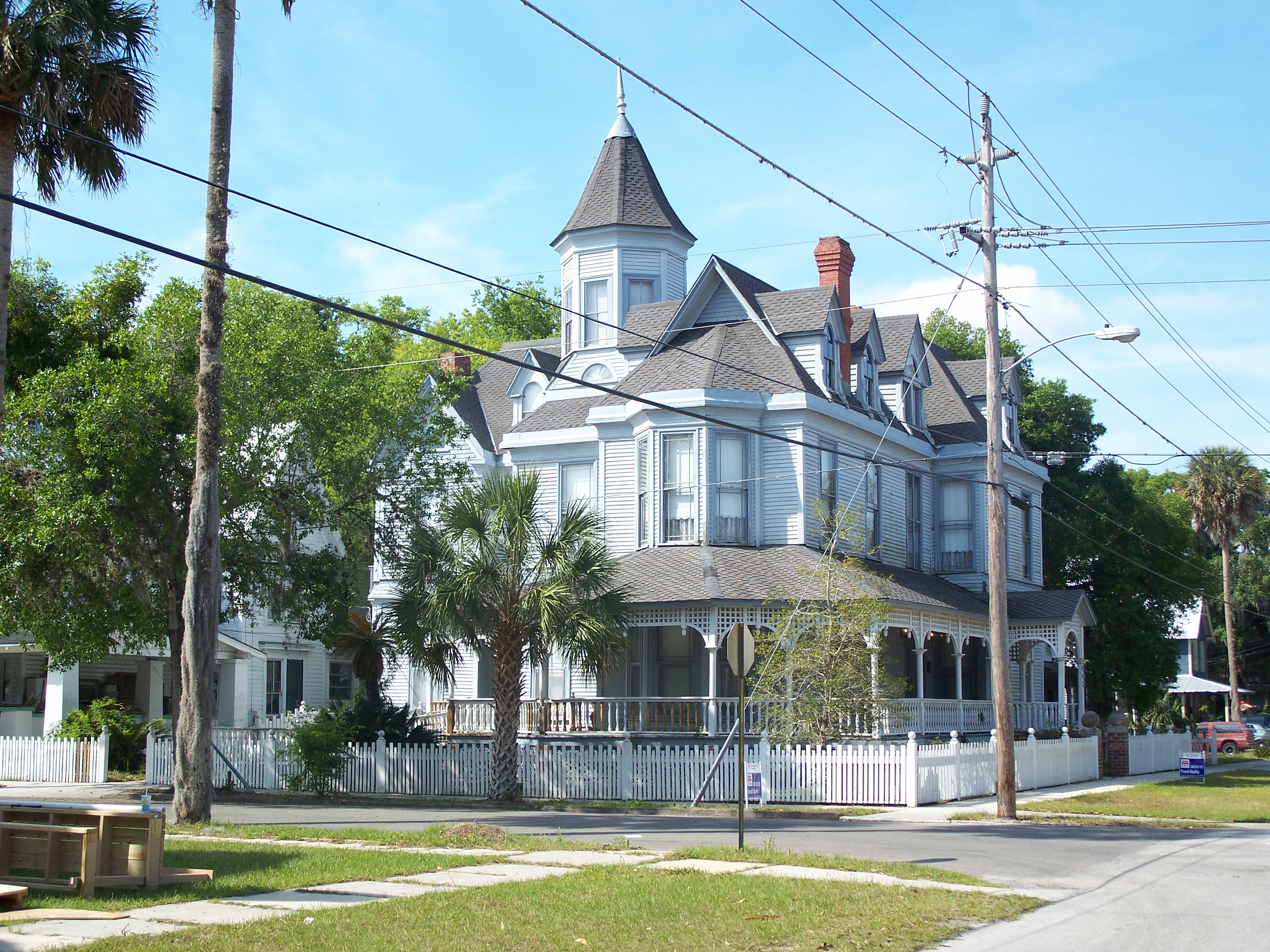
House for Sherman Conant, Palatka, Florida, 1886.
