= Newburyport Harbor Front Range Light =

- U.S. National Register of Historic Places
- U.S. Historic district – Contributing property
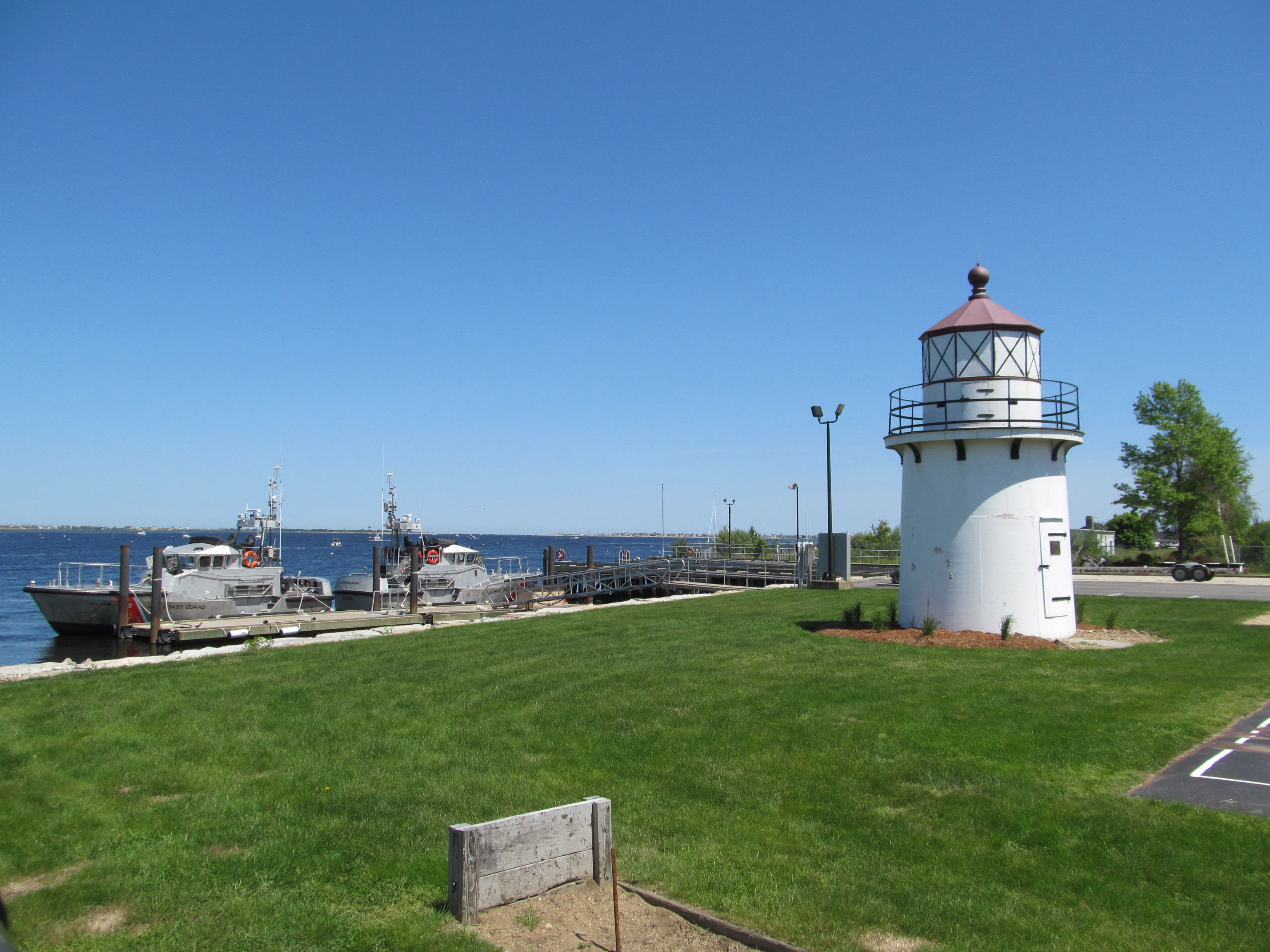
- Front Range Light

- Location within Massachusetts Location within the United States
- Location: Newburyport, Massachusetts
- Coordinates: 42°48′41.500″N 70°51′53.500″W
- Area: less than one acre
- Built: 1873
- Part of: Newburyport Historic District (ID84002411)
- MPS: Lighthouses of Massachusetts TR
- NRHP reference No.: 87001486

Significant dates
- Added to NRHP: June 15, 1987
- Designated CP: August 2, 1984

The Newburyport Harbor Front Range Light is one of two historic range lights in Newburyport, Massachusetts. When it was built in 1873, it was located at Bayley's Wharf, and provided, in combination with the Rear Range Light, a critical aid for navigating into Newburyport's harbor. In 1964 the light was moved to its present location on the grounds of the Merrimack River Coast Guard Station. The stations are no longer in service, but serve as a daymark for arriving mariners.

The light was listed on the National Register of Historic Places in 1987, and included in the Newburyport Historic District in 1984.

== Description and history ==
Range lights, or leading lights, are pairs of beacons used to guide ships and ensure safe passage. The beacons consist of two lights that are separated in distance and elevation, so that when they are aligned, with one above the other, they provide a bearing. The original range lights at Newburyport Harbor were maintained by private subscriptions. By 1872 Congress had appropriated funds to establish publicly maintained range lights after one of the previous pair was destroyed in a storm.

Newburyport's front range light is a circular structure, with a steel plate exterior, that is 35 feet (11 m) tall. Access is gained via a hatch-like curved door. The tower is topped by a ten-sided lantern house, surrounded by an iron balcony with railing. The windows of the lantern house are covered in wood. The light was constructed in 1873 on Bayley's Wharf, a short way west of its present location, along with the rear range light, which stands near Water Street. The light was converted from coal-based power to electricity in 1933, and automated in 1952. In about 1961 a 20-foot (6.1 m) hexagonal extension was built to increase the tower's height; this has since been removed. The tower was moved to its present site in 1964, at which the Coast Guard station was built in 1972.

== See also ==
- National Register of Historic Places listings in Essex County, Massachusetts
