= Newburyport Harbor Rear Range Light =

- U.S. National Register of Historic Places
- U.S. Historic district – Contributing property
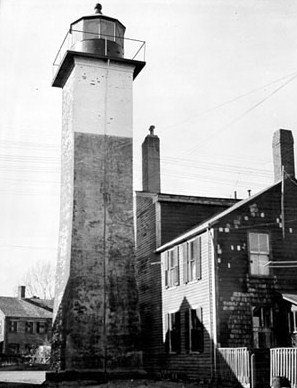
- Newburyport Harbor Rear Range Light

- Location within Massachusetts Location within the United States
- Location: Newburyport, Massachusetts
- Coordinates: 42°48′40.52″N 70°51′57.88″W
- Area: less than one acre
- Built: 1873
- Part of: Newburyport Historic District (ID84002411)
- MPS: Lighthouses of Massachusetts TR
- NRHP reference No.: 87000887

Significant dates
- Added to NRHP: June 15, 1987
- Designated CP: August 2, 1984

The Newburyport Harbor Rear Range Light is a historic lighthouse at 61½ Water St. near the Merrimack River in Newburyport, Massachusetts. It was built in 1873 as one of a pair of range lights for guiding ships up the river to the city's harbor.

== History ==
Range lights, or leading lights, are pairs of beacons used to guide ships and ensure safe passage. The beacons consist of two lights that are separated in distance and elevation, so that when they are aligned, with one above the other, they provide a bearing. The original range lights at Newburyport Harbor were maintained by private subscriptions. By 1872 Congress had appropriated funds to establish publicly maintained range lights after one of the previous pair was destroyed in a storm.

The rear light is a brick tower, 53 feet (16 m) in height, located close to Water Street near the Merrimack River Coast Guard Station. The tower was traditionally painted white on the upper third of the river-facing side, with a thick white stripe down the rest of the facade. That side is now painted entirely white, while the other three sides are unpainted. The tower is topped by an eight-sided lens room, which is surrounded by an iron balcony and railing.

When the range lights became active in 1873 local caretakers took responsibility for them. The job was later transferred to Plum Island lighthouse keepers.

=== Decommissioning ===
In 1961 the range lights were decommissioned and the rear light became private property. Today it is available to rent for events and offers a view of the river and city.

The lighthouse, along with its mate, the Newburyport Harbor Front Range Light, was added to the National Register of Historic Places in 1987, and included in the Newburyport Historic District in 1984.

== See also ==
- National Register of Historic Places listings in Essex County, Massachusetts
