= Benjamin Coker =

Benjamin Coker may refer to:

- Benjamin Coker House, Massachusetts
- Ben Coker, footballer
