= Cushing House Museum and Garden =

Historic house in Massachusetts, United States

- Caleb Cushing House
- U.S. National Register of Historic Places
- U.S. National Historic Landmark
- U.S. Historic district – Contributing property
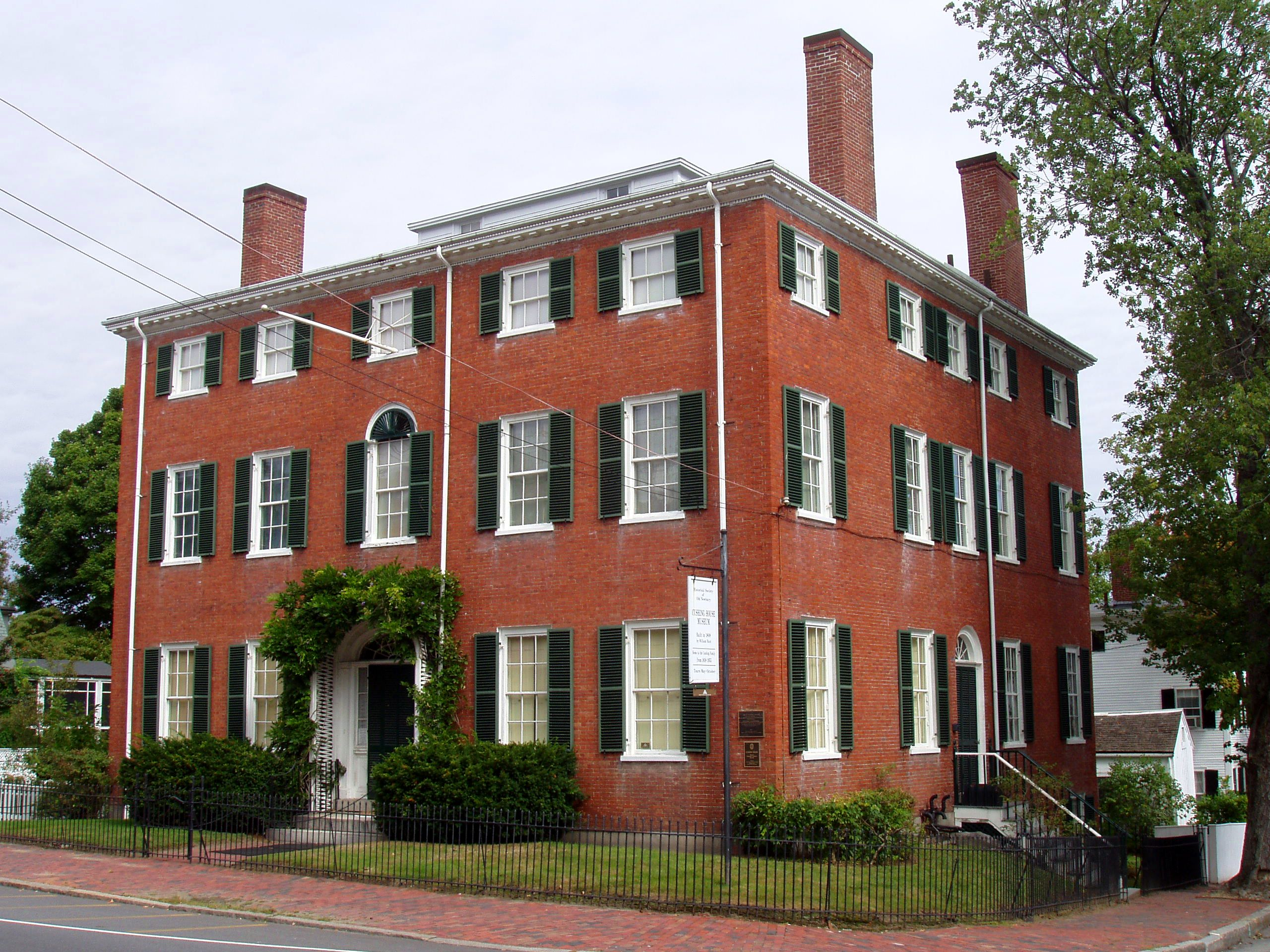
- Cushing House Museum, Newburyport, Massachusetts

- Location within Massachusetts Location within the United States
- Location: 98 High Street, Newburyport, Massachusetts
- Coordinates: 42°48′24″N 70°52′16″W
- Built: ca. 1808
- Architectural style: Federal
- Part of: Newburyport Historic District (ID84002411)
- NRHP reference No.: 73000327

Significant dates
- Added to NRHP: November 7, 1973
- Designated NHL: November 7, 1973
- Designated CP: August 2, 1984

The Cushing House Museum and Garden (circa 1808), also known as the Caleb Cushing House, is a Federal style mansion with a fine garden located at 98 High Street, Newburyport, Massachusetts, United States. It was a home of diplomat Caleb Cushing and is a National Historic Landmark. It is now the home of the Historical Society of Old Newbury, also known as the Museum of Old Newbury, and guided tours are offered year-round.

The house is a center entrance four-story brick mansion in the Federal style, with entrances at both the front and sides, and two chimneys on each side. In shape it is a flattened cube, with five windows arranged symmetrically across both front and sides. Its main entry is crowned with a modest fanlight, echoed by a fan-shaped wooden motif atop the window above it. On the grounds, visitors will find a nineteenth-century garden, fruit trees, a privy, cobbled yard and carriage house. In August 2025, the Museum of Old Newbury opened the Perkins Art & Research Center, which is housed in the former Perkins Mint on the Museum's grounds. The Perkins Art & Research Center contains a sizeable manuscript collection, a research library, and the Society's art collection.

Within the house are fine collections of silver, furniture, portraits, clocks, needlework, antique fans, hatboxes, nineteenth century toys, and more from New England, Asia, and Europe. The China Trade Room displays early China Trade decorative arts including four Chinese coastal Hong paintings. An extensive clock collection includes examples made by local master clockmakers David Wood and Daniel Balch. In the canopy bedroom stands a carved seventeenth-century Dutch cradle and a three-sided crib. Many oil portrait paintings hang in the house, including a Cecilia Beaux portrait of Margaret Cushing and 1801 paintings by John Brewster, Jr., of Newburyport's Prince family. The museum also maintains a collection of area maps, photographs, and genealogical references.

The house was declared a National Historic Landmark and listed on the National Register of Historic Places in 1973, and included in the Newburyport Historic District in 1984. The house is deemed nationally significant for its association with Cushing, a 19th-century diplomat whose defining achievement was the Treaty of Wanghia, negotiated in 1844 with the Qing dynasty of China. This treaty was the first in which the United States secured equivalent rights to those of traditional colonial powers (in this case, the United Kingdom).

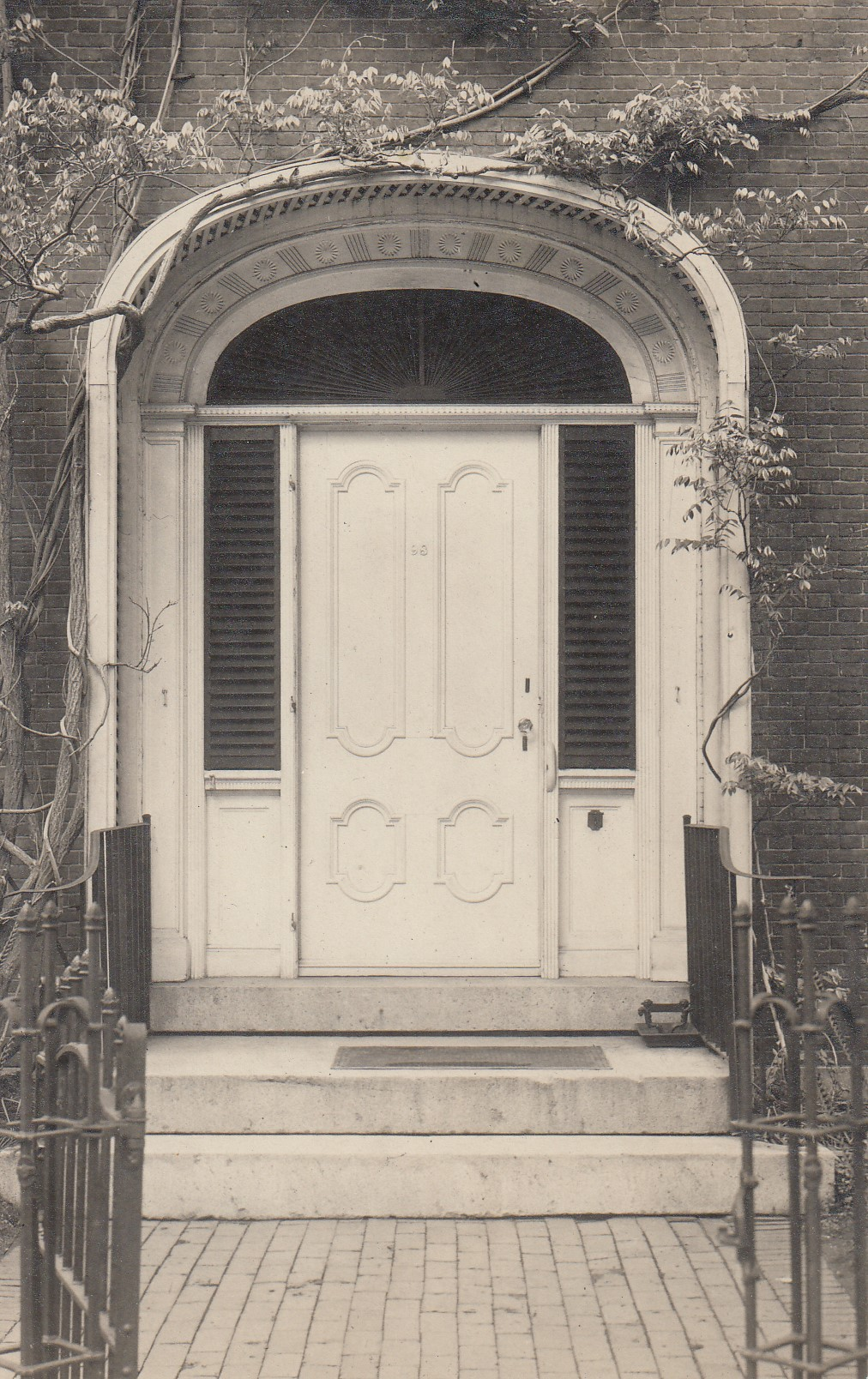
Vintage postcard of the front door of Cushing House, Newburyport, Massachusetts.

== See also ==
- National Register of Historic Places listings in Essex County, Massachusetts
- List of National Historic Landmarks in Massachusetts
