= Benjamin Coker House =

Historic house in Massachusetts, United States

- U.S. National Register of Historic Places
- U.S. Historic district – Contributing property
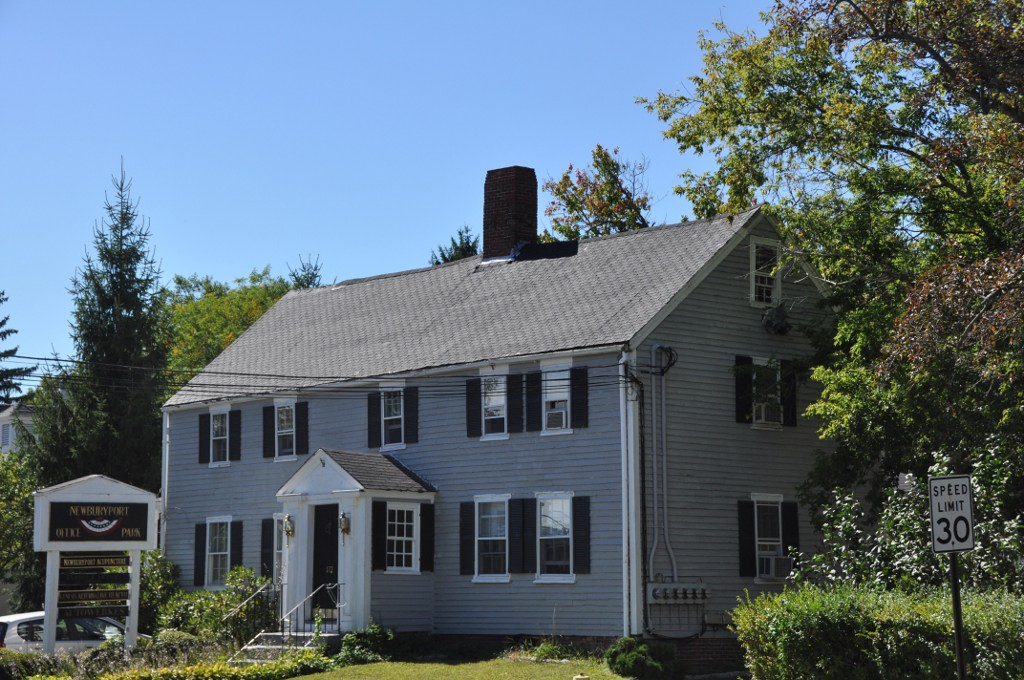

- Location within Massachusetts Location within the United States
- Location: 172 State Street, Newburyport, Massachusetts
- Coordinates: 42°48′5″N 70°52′31″W
- Built: 1700
- Architectural style: Colonial
- Part of: Newburyport Historic District (ID84002411)
- MPS: First Period Buildings of Eastern Massachusetts TR
- NRHP reference No.: 90000247

Significant dates
- Added to NRHP: March 9, 1990
- Designated CP: August 2, 1984

The Benjamin Coker House is a historic First Period house in Newburyport, Massachusetts. The oldest portion of the house, the central chimney and the rooms to its left, were built c. 1700 on a site at the corner of High and Federal Streets. The building was widened in the mid 18th century, adding the rooms to the right. The building was moved to its present location in 1856, and enlarged with a two-story addition on the rear. It underwent a major rehabilitation in 1989, but retains some mid 18th century decorative details.

The house was listed on the National Register of Historic Places in 1990, after it had been included in the Newburyport Historic District in 1984.

== See also ==
- National Register of Historic Places listings in Essex County, Massachusetts
