= First Baptist Church (Methuen, Massachusetts) =

Historic church in Massachusetts, United States

- U.S. National Register of Historic Places
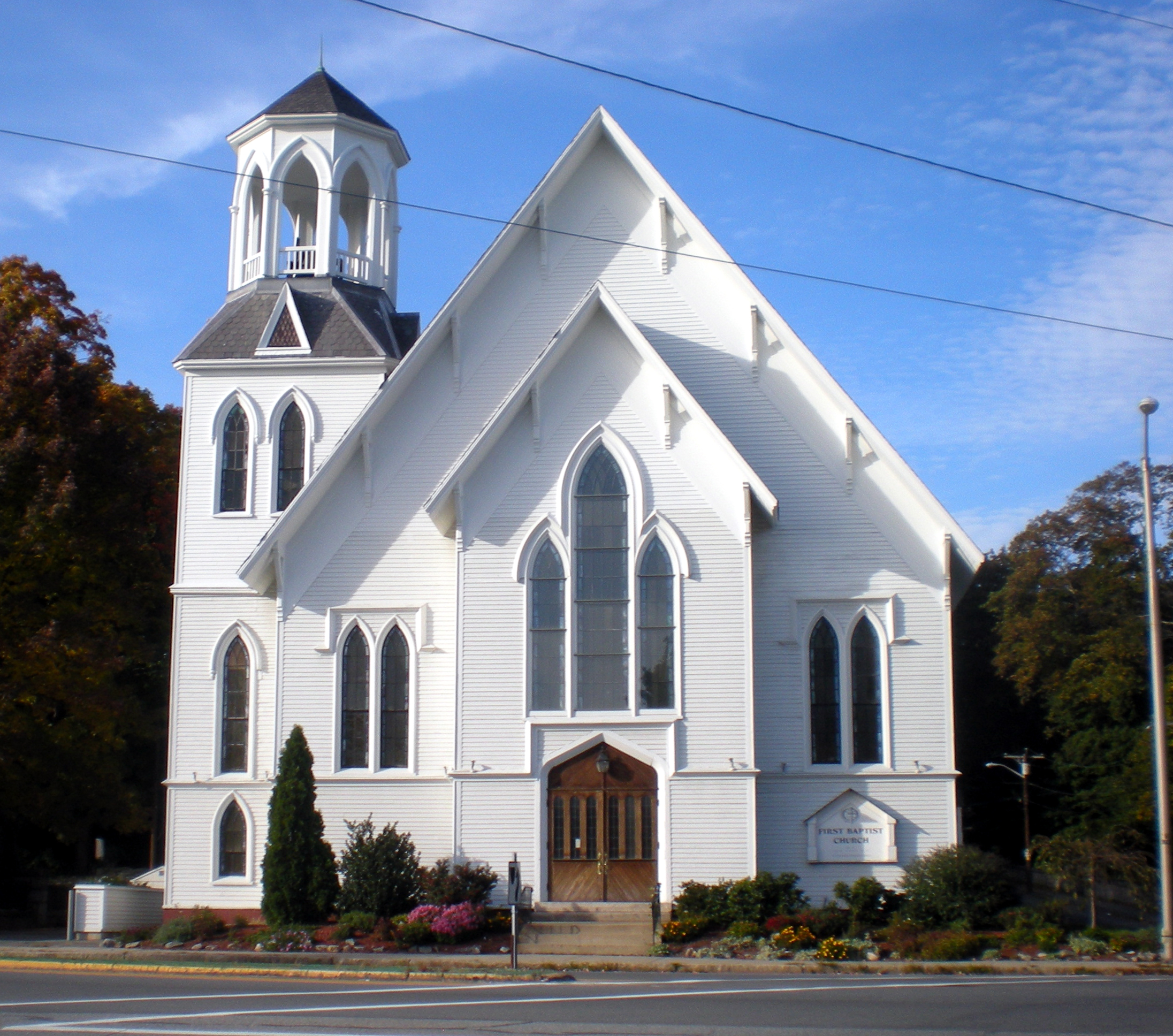
- First Baptist Church Methuen MA

- Location within Massachusetts Location within the United States
- Location: 30 Park St., Methuen, Massachusetts
- Coordinates: 42°43′41″N 71°11′6″W
- Area: less than one acre
- Built: 1869
- Architect: Rufus Sargent
- Architectural style: Gothic Revival
- MPS: Methuen MRA
- NRHP reference No.: 84002365
- Added to NRHP: January 20, 1984

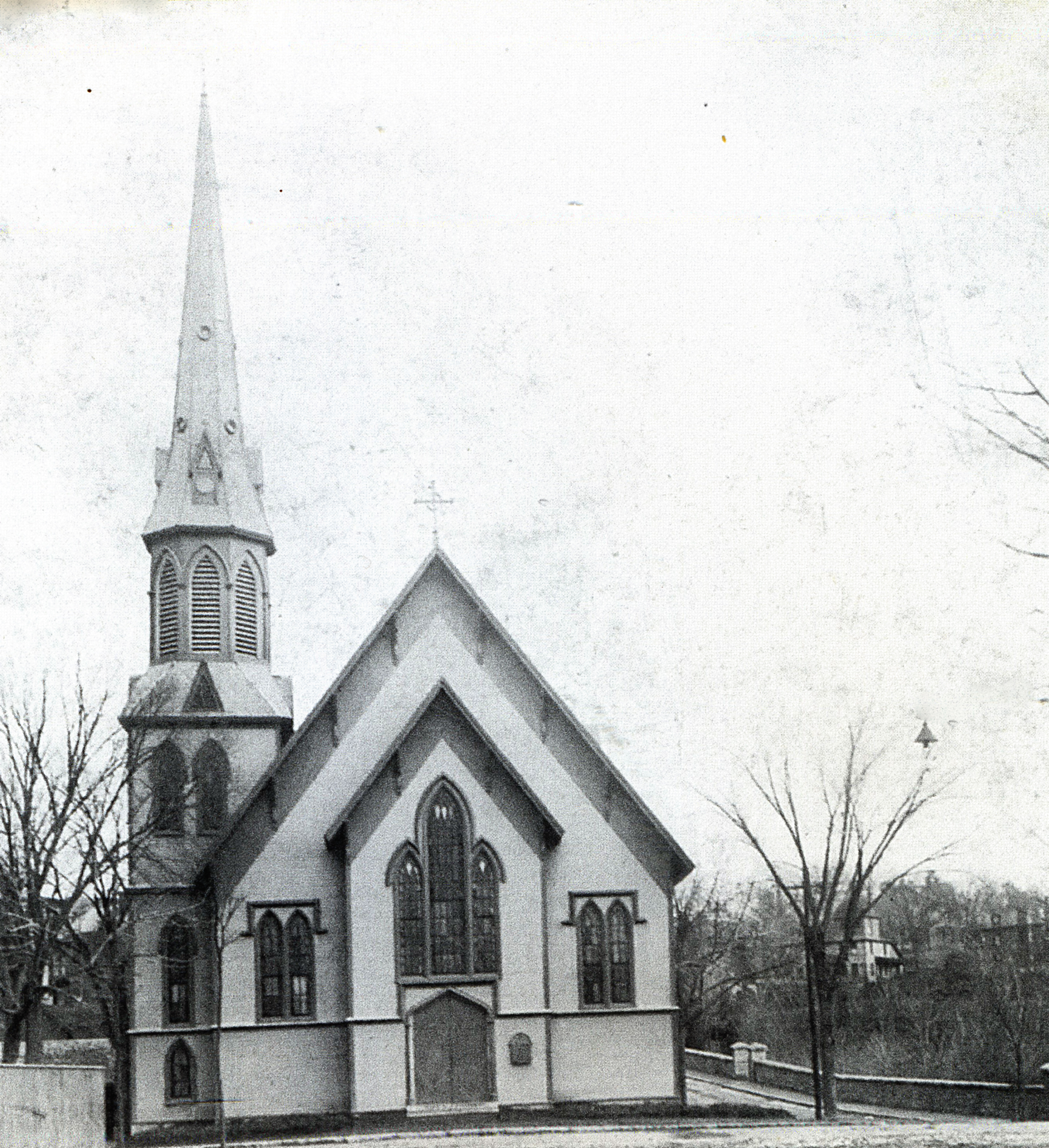
First Baptist Church with its original steeple, circa 1900

First Baptist Church is an historic Baptist church building at 30 Park Street in Methuen, Massachusetts. Built in 1869 for a congregation established in 1815, it is one of the town's finest examples of Carpenter Gothic architecture. It was listed on the National Register of Historic Places in 1984.

== Architecture and history ==
The First Baptist Church stands a short way south of Methuen's central business district, at the northeast corner of Park Road and Lawrence Street. It is a tall 1-1/2 story wood frame structure, with a gable roof oriented facing Lawrence Street. The exterior is finished in wooden clapboards, and the roof has deep eaves adorned with jigsawn brackets. A square tower rises from the left side, through three stages to a roof and open belfry. The roof sections below the belfry have small steeply pitched triangular dormers, and the belfry openings are in the shape of Gothic arches, matching that of most of the building's windows. On the main facade, a central entry section projects, with a double-leaf entry set in a pointed-arch opening, with a three-part Gothic-arched window above.

The First Baptist Church was formed on March 1, 1815 with thirteen members and services were held in the Daniel Frye house and in an old meeting house which was enlarged twice. In 1840 they built a church on this site which burned in 1869. The present church was built in 1869 and dedicated in January 1870. The architect was Rufus Sargent of Newburyport. The bell, which was cast in Baltimore and weighed 1600 lb was installed in 1878. The steeple was removed in 1913.

== See also ==
- National Register of Historic Places listings in Methuen, Massachusetts
- National Register of Historic Places listings in Essex County, Massachusetts
