= Rockport National Bank =

Former bank in Rockport, Massachusetts, US

Coordinates: 42°39′29.8″N 70°37′5.4″W

- Founded: 1851; 175 years ago
- Defunct: August 30, 2014; 11 years ago
- Fate: Acquired by Institution for Savings
- Headquarters: Rockport, Massachusetts

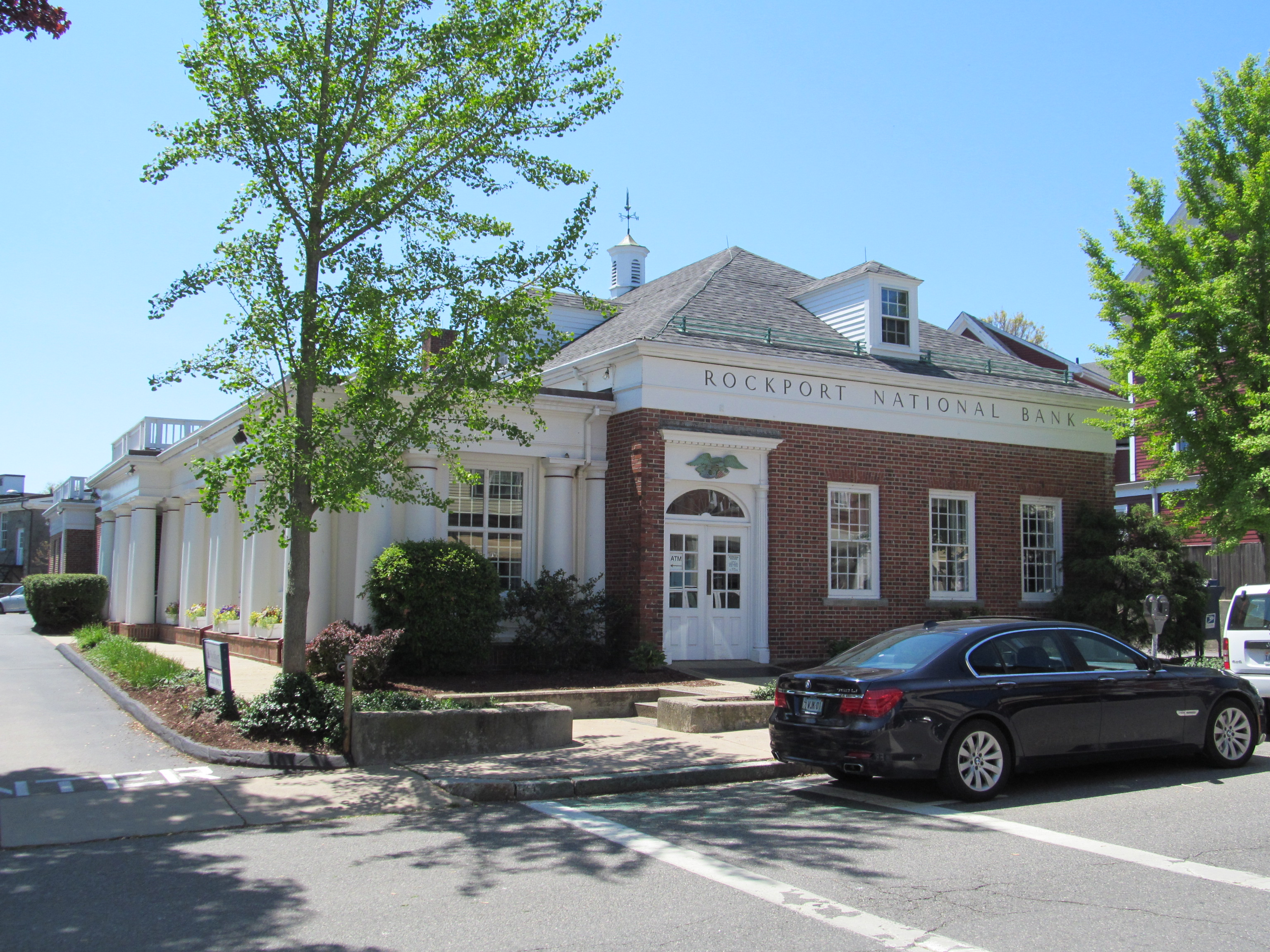
The former Rockport National Bank in Rockport, Massachusetts

Rockport National Bank was a bank based in Rockport, Massachusetts. In 2014, it was acquired by Institution for Savings.

It had 4 branches.

== History ==
Rockport National Bank first opened in Rockport, Massachusetts as a state bank in 1851.

It received its national charter on March 8, 1865.

In September 2013, Peter Anderson, the president and chief executive officer of the company, retired.

In August 2014, the company was acquired by Institution for Savings for $28.3 million in cash.
