= Daniel Balch =

Daniel Balch (died November 30, 1790) was an American clock maker. He is perhaps best known for his exquisite workmanship, his high quantity of extant samples, and a particular piece that was sold at Sotheby's to Leigh Keno for over $55,000.

Daniel's ancestor, John Balch, first came to America in 1623. Not much is known about Daniel Balch's life, but it is likely he was born in Newburyport, Massachusetts in the first half of the 18th century. He signed his work "Dan Balch", and may have spent time in nearby Newbury, Massachusetts. He later died in Newburyport (1790), and is interred in Old Hill Burying Ground.

His extant work tends to be from the 1760s. In 1789, shortly before his death, he bequeathed his Balch coat of arms to his eldest son, also named Daniel.

Some of his work can be seen at the Cushing House Museum and Garden in Newburyport.
