= Peabody City Hall =

Building in Peabody, Massachusetts, United States

- U.S. National Register of Historic Places
- U.S. Historic district – Contributing property
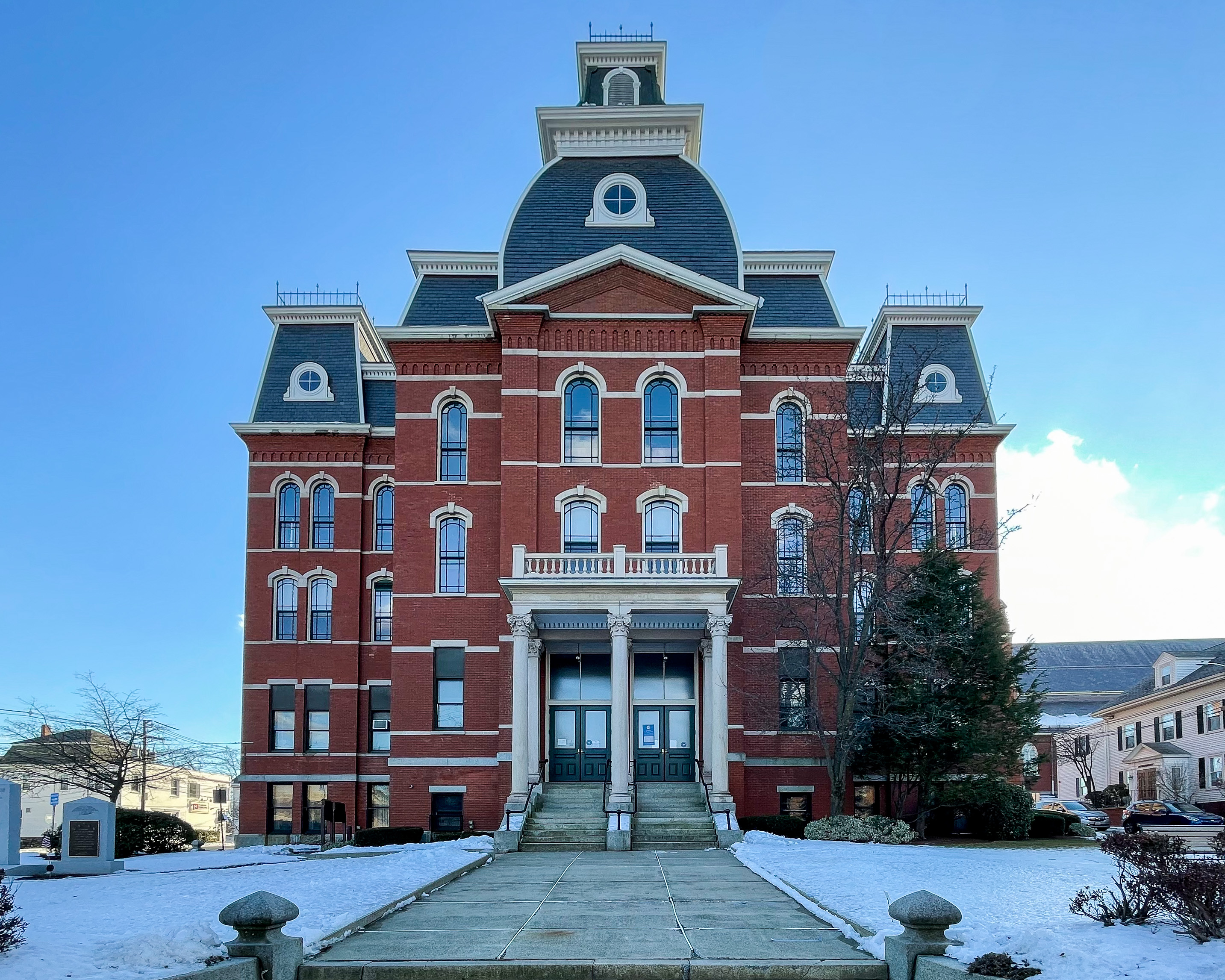
- Peabody City Hall

- Location within Massachusetts Location within the United States
- Location: Peabody, Massachusetts
- Coordinates: 42°31′35″N 70°55′44″W
- Built: 1883
- Built by: Hamilton & Balcomb
- Architect: Rufus Sargent
- Architectural style: Second Empire
- Part of: Peabody Civic Center Historic District (ID80000477)
- NRHP reference No.: 72000142

Significant dates
- Added to NRHP: July 27, 1972
- Designated CP: November 25, 1980

Peabody City Hall is the historic city hall of Peabody, Massachusetts. It is located at 24 Lowell Street, near Peabody Square.

== History and architecture ==
City Hall was built in 1883 as Town Hall, becoming City Hall when Peabody reincorporated as a city in 1916. The architect was Rufus Sargent of Newburyport. The building was built by Hamilton & Balcomb of Salem.

The three-story Second Empire brick building was built in 1883. It follows a roughly square plan, with central projecting sections on each side, and a steeply pitched mansard-style roof with turret-like sections at the building corners. The front entry, facing Lowell Street, projects further than the others, with stairs leading to a recessed doorway sheltered by a portico supported by columns and pilasters. The building's red brick is set off by bands of granite trim, including that surrounding the arched portions of the building's windows.

As built, the basement floor contained police offices and the first floor contained the government offices and a large hall. The second and third floors of the building was entirely taken up by an auditorium, used for performances and town meeting, later city council meetings. This space was decorated by Matthew L. Robinson of Boston. In 1946, due to structural weaknesses the auditorium was ordered closed by state officials, and city council moved into the large hall downstairs. In 1980 the building was restored, and city council moved back upstairs into the newly renamed Frank L. Wiggin Auditorium, and the police department moved to its own building, the former space being taken over by other government offices. In 2018 the auditorium was refurbished again, with hopes that it could be again used for performances.

The building was listed on the National Register of Historic Places in 1972, and included in the Peabody Civic Center Historic District in 1980.

== See also ==
- National Register of Historic Places listings in Essex County, Massachusetts
