= United States Post Office–Newburyport Main =

- US Post Office–Newburyport Main
- U.S. National Register of Historic Places
- U.S. Historic district – Contributing property
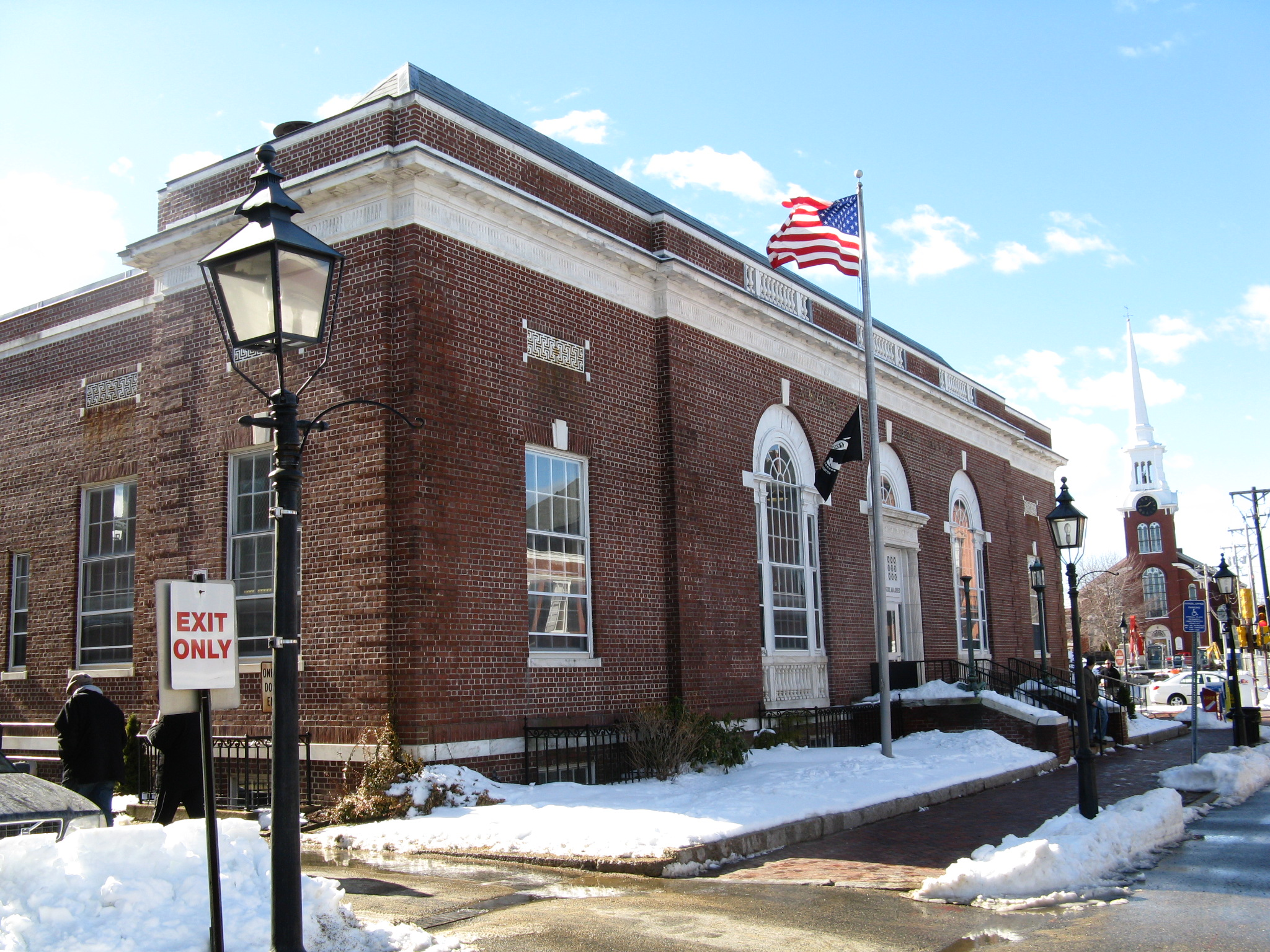
- US Post Office Newburyport

- Location within Massachusetts Location within the United States
- Location: 61 Pleasant Street, Newburyport, Massachusetts
- Coordinates: 42°48′38.20″N 70°52′20.53″W
- Built: 1927
- Built by: A. M. Lundberg
- Architect: Office of the Supervising Architect
- Architectural style: Colonial Revival
- Part of: Newburyport Historic District (ID84002411)
- NRHP reference No.: 86001341

Significant dates
- Added to NRHP: June 18, 1986
- Designated CP: August 2, 1984

The US Post Office—Newburyport Main is a historic post office in Newburyport, Massachusetts. Construction of the Georgian Revival single story brick building was begun in 1927 and completed in 1928. It was Newburyport's first purpose-built post office facility. The building is faced in red brick laid in running bond. Its central section, which houses the lobby area, projects slightly from wings on either side, and features three round arches trimmed in marble. The wings house offices, and the rear of the building houses the service area. The front block has a pitched hip roof, while the rear portion has a flat roof.

The building was designed by architects in the Office of the Supervising Architect, then under the direction of acting supervising architect James A. Wetmore. The contractor was A. M. Lundberg of St. Louis, Missouri.

The building was listed on the National Register of Historic Places in 1986; it was also included in the Newburyport Historic District in 1984.

== See also ==
- National Register of Historic Places listings in Essex County, Massachusetts
- List of United States post offices
