= John Brewster Jr. =

American artist (1766–1854)

- Brewster in 1801
- Born: 1766; Hampton, Connecticut
- Died: August 13, 1854; Buxton, Maine
- Known for: Painting

John Brewster Jr. (May 30 or May 31, 1766 – August 13, 1854) was a prolific, Deaf itinerant painter who produced many charming portraits of well-off New England families, especially their children. He lived much of the latter half of his life in Buxton, Maine, USA, recording the faces of much of Maine's elite society of his time.

According to the website of the Fenimore Art Museum in Cooperstown, New York, "Brewster was not an artist who incidentally was Deaf but rather a Deaf artist, one in a long tradition that owes many of its features and achievements to the fact that Deaf people are, as scholars have noted, visual people."

== Family and early life ==
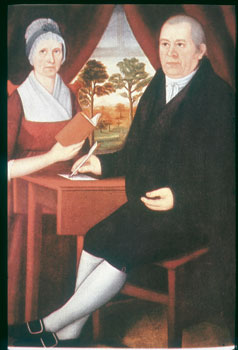
Brewster's father, Dr. John Brewster Sr., and his stepmother, Ruth Avery Brewster, c. 1795–1800

Little is known about Brewster's childhood or youth. He was the third child born in Hampton, Connecticut, to Dr. John and Mary (Durkee) Brewster. His mother died when he was 17. His father remarried Ruth Avery of Brooklyn, Connecticut, and they went on to have four more children.

John Brewster Sr., a doctor and descendant of William Brewster, the Pilgrim leader, was a member of the Connecticut General Assembly and also active in the local church.

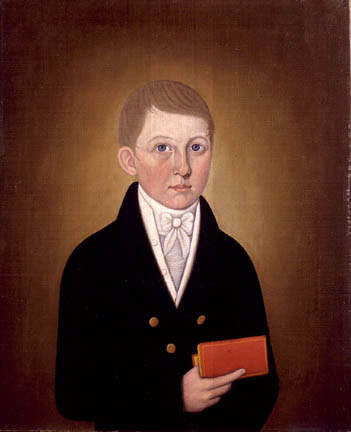
Unidentified Boy with Book (1810) by John Brewster Jr. (from the collection of the Florence Griswold Museum, Old Lyme, Connecticut)

One of the younger Brewster's "more touching and polished full-length portraits" is of his father and stepmother, according to Ben Genocchio, who wrote a review of an exhibition of Brewster's portraits in the New York Times. They are shown at home in conventional poses and wearing refined but not opulent dress in a modestly furnished room. His mother sits behind her husband, reading while he is writing. "She stares directly at the viewer, though softly, even submissively, while her husband stares off into the distance as if locked in some deep thought."

Being Deaf from birth, and growing up in a time when no standardized sign language for the Deaf existed, the young Brewster probably interacted with few people outside of the circle of his family and friends, with whom he would have learned to communicate using a form of home sign. A kindly minister taught him to paint, and by the 1790s he was traveling through Connecticut, Maine, Massachusetts, and eastern New York State, taking advantage of his family connections to offer his services to the wealthy merchant class.

His younger brother, Dr. Royal Brewster, moved to Buxton, Maine in late 1795. The artist either moved up with him or followed shortly afterward and painted likenesses in and around Portland in between trips back to Connecticut.

== Work as a deaf artist ==
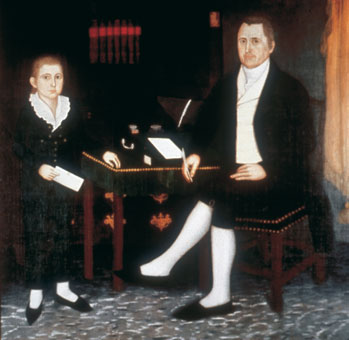
James Prince and Son, William Henry (1801) by John Brewster Jr. Prince was a wealthy merchant from Newburyport, a shipping center in Massachusetts. The painter included numerous expensive luxuries to show Prince as wealthy and a gentleman: Curtains and a fine floor indicated wealth; the bookcase with books and the desk suggest learning. The boy is symbolized as entering world of adults by his holding a letter. (from the collection of the Historical Society of Old Newbury)

Brewster probably communicated with others using pantomime and a small amount of writing. In this way, Brewster managed the business of arranging poses along with negotiating prices and artistic ideas with his sitters. As an itinerant portraitist working in the late 18th and early 19th centuries in the United States, he would travel great distances, often staying in unfamiliar places for months at a time.

His deafness may have given Brewster some advantages in portrait painting, according to the Florence Griswold Museum exhibit web page: "Unable to hear and speak, Brewster focused his energy and ability to capture minute differences in facial expression. He also greatly emphasized the gaze of his sitters, as eye contact was such a critical part of communication among the Deaf. Scientific studies have proven that since Deaf people rely on visual cues for communication [they] can differentiate subtle differences in facial expressions much better than hearing people."

== Influences ==
Brewster's early, large portraits show the influence of the work of Ralph Earl (1751–1801), another itinerant painter. Paintings by the two artists (especially in Brewster's early work) show similar scale, costumes, composition and settings, Paul D'Ambrosio has pointed out in a catalog (2005) for a traveling exhibition of Brewster's work,"A Deaf Artist in Early America: The Worlds of John Brewster Jr."

Earl was influenced by the 18th century English "Grand Manner" style of painting, with its dramatic, grand, very rhetorical style (exemplified in many portraits by Thomas Gainsborough and Sir Joshua Reynolds. Earl and Brewster refashioned the style, changing it from lofty and grand to more humble and casual settings.

== Career ==
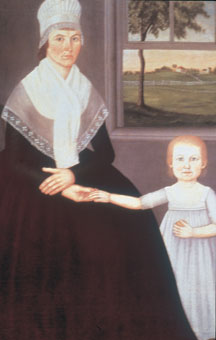
Mother with Son (Lucy Knapp Mygatt and Son, George, of Danbury, Connecticut), 1799

In the early 19th century, Brewster habitually painted half-length portraits which saved him labor, saved his patrons money and "were better suited to his limited abilities," according to Genocchio. Some of the paintings are almost identical, down to the same clothes and furniture, with only the heads setting them apart.

In 1805 his brother, Dr. Royal Brewster, finished construction of his Federal style house in Buxton, and John Brewster moved in. For the rest of his life, he lived in the home with his brother's family.

By about 1805, Brewster had his own style of portraying children in full length, with skimpy garments or nightclothes, soft, downy hair and big, cute eyes for a sweet, appealing affect. But the perspective problems remained, with the figures seeming out of scale with their environment.

At about this time the artist also began to sign and date his paintings more frequently. He also moved away from the large-format Grand Manner-influenced style and turned to smaller, more intimate portraits in which he focused more attention on the faces of his subjects.

In the years just before 1817, Brewster traveled farther for clients as his career flourished.

== Francis O. Watts with Bird ==
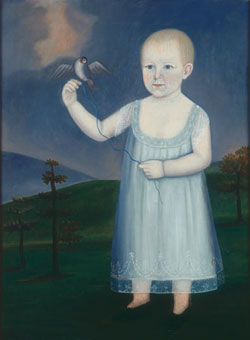
Francis O. Watts with Bird (1805) by John Brewster Jr. (from the collection of the Fenimore Art Museum, Cooperstown, New York)

Typical of Brewster's portraits is "Francis O. Watts with Bird" (1805), showing "an innocent looking boy with manly features" wearing a nightslip and holding a bird on his finger and with a string. The surrounding landscape is "strangely low and wildly out of scale—the young boy towers over trees and dwarfs distant mountains. He looks like a giant," Genocchio has written. Or he looks as if the viewer must be lying down, looking up at the child from the ground. Brewster always struggled with the relationship of his figures to the background.

A more positive view of the portrait comes from the Web page about the 2006 exhibit at the Florence Griswold Museum website: "Brewster's serene and ethereal portrait of Francis O. Watts is one of his most compelling portraits of a child. In this work—particularly Francis’ white dress and the peaceful landscape he inhabits—modern viewers often feel a palpable sense of the silence that was Brewster's world.

"The bird on the string symbolizes mortality because only after the child's death could the bird go free, just like the child's soul. Infant mortality was high during Brewster's time and artists employed this image often in association with children."

== In school ==
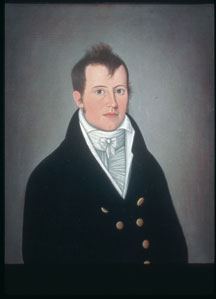
Moses Quinby (c. 1810–1815). Quinby was a successful lawyer from Stroudwater, Maine. He was probably painted when Brewster was traveling in Maine.

From 1817 to 1820, Brewster interrupted his career to learn sign language at the newly opened Connecticut Asylum in Hartford, now known as the American School for the Deaf.

Brewster, at age 51, was by far the oldest in a class of seven students, the average age of which was 19. It was the first class that attended the school and witnessed the birth of American Sign Language (ASL).

== Later life ==
When Brewster returned to Buxton and to his portraits, "he seems to have taken more care when painting the faces of his subjects," Genocchio wrote," resulting in portraits that show an increased sensitivity to the characters of his subjects."

After the 1830s, little is known of Brewster's work—or of Brewster. He died in Buxton on August 13, 1854.

== Assessments of Brewster's artistry ==
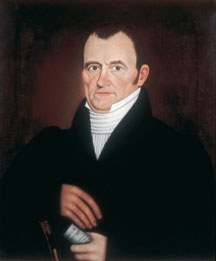
Reverend Daniel Marrett (1831). An example of a Brewster portrait from his late career, many of which show great depth and strength of characterization. Marrett's furrowed brow and chisled features convey the seriousness of his convictions. The paper he holds quotes Amos 4:12, "Prepare to meet thy God." (from the collection of Historic New England/SPNEA)

Brewster "created hauntingly beautiful images of American life during the formative period of the nation," according to a page at the Fenimore Art Museum website devoted to a 2005–2006 exhibition of the artist's work. "Working in a style that emphasized simpler settings [than the "Grand Manner" style], along with broad, flat areas of color, and soft, expressive facial features, Brewster achieved a directness and intensity of vision rarely equaled."

The Fenimore website also says, "His extant portraits show his ability to produce delicate and sensitive likenesses in full-size or miniature, and in oil on canvas or ivory. He was especially successful in capturing childhood innocence in his signature full-length likenesses of young children.

The website says Brewster left "an invaluable record of his era and a priceless artistic legacy."

According to the anonymous writer of the Florence Griswold Museum's web page about the same exhibit, "Brewster's Deafness may also have shaped his mature portrait style, which centers on his emphasis on the face of his sitters, particularly the gaze. He managed to achieve a penetrating grasp of personality in likenesses that engage the viewer directly. Brewster combined a muted palette that highlights flesh tones with excellent draftsmanship to draw attention to the eyes of his sitters. The importance of direct eye contact to a Deaf person cannot be overstated."

The same writer also says, "Brewster was one of the greatest folk painters in American history as one of the key figures in the Connecticut style of American Folk Portraiture. In addition, Brewster's paintings serve as a key part of Maine history. Brewster was the most prolific painter of the Maine elite, documenting through the portraits details of the life of Maine's federal elite."

Genocchio, reviewing the exhibit for the New York Times, took a dimmer view, noting Brewster's difficulty with painting backgrounds but admiring his "sweetly appealing" paintings of children.

John Brewster's paintings are written about at some length in Teju Cole’s novel Open City.

== Some individual works ==
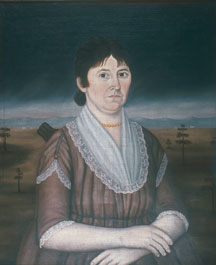
Unidentified Woman in a Landscape (c. 1805) (from the collection of the Fenimore Art Museum, Cooperstown, New York)

- Boy with Book (1810); unidentified subject (Florence Griswold Museum, Old Lyme, Connecticut, collection)
- Francis O. Watts with Bird (1805) (Fenimore Art Museum, Cooperstown, New York, collection)
- Dr. John Brewster and Ruth Avery Brewster (c. 1795–1800) (Old Sturbridge Village collection)
- Mother with Son (Lucy Knapp Mygatt and Son, George) (1799) (Palmer Museum of Art of the Pennsylvania State University collection)
- James Prince and Son, William Henry (1801) (Historical Society of Old Newbury collection)
- Portrait of James Prince, Jr. (1781-1802) (Historical Society of Old Newbury collection)
- Portrait of Benjamin Prince (1782-1815) (Historical Society of Old Newbury collection)
- Woman in a Landscape (unidentified subject) (c. 1805) (Fenimore Art Museum, Cooperstown, New York, collection)
- Moses Quinby (c. 1810–1815) (Bowdoin College Museum of Art collection)
- Reverend Daniel Marrett, 1831 (Historic New England/SPNEA collection)
- Elizabeth Abigail Wallingford (c.1808) (Brick Store Museum collection)

== Exhibits ==
- "A Deaf Artist in Early America: The Worlds of John Brewster Jr.," Fenimore Art Museum, Cooperstown, New York, April 1 to December 31, 2005; Florence Griswold Museum, Old Lyme, Connecticut, June 3 through September 10, 2006 (Florence Griswold Museum exhibition sponsored in connection with The American School for the Deaf). The show, with some augmentation, was at the American Folk Art Museum, New York City, from October 2006 to January 7, 2007.
- The Saco Museum in Saco, Maine, is believed to hold the largest collection of John Brewster Jr., paintings, including the only known full-length (74 5/8 inches long) adult portraits, Colonel Thomas Cutts and Mrs. Thomas Cutts.

== Bibliography ==
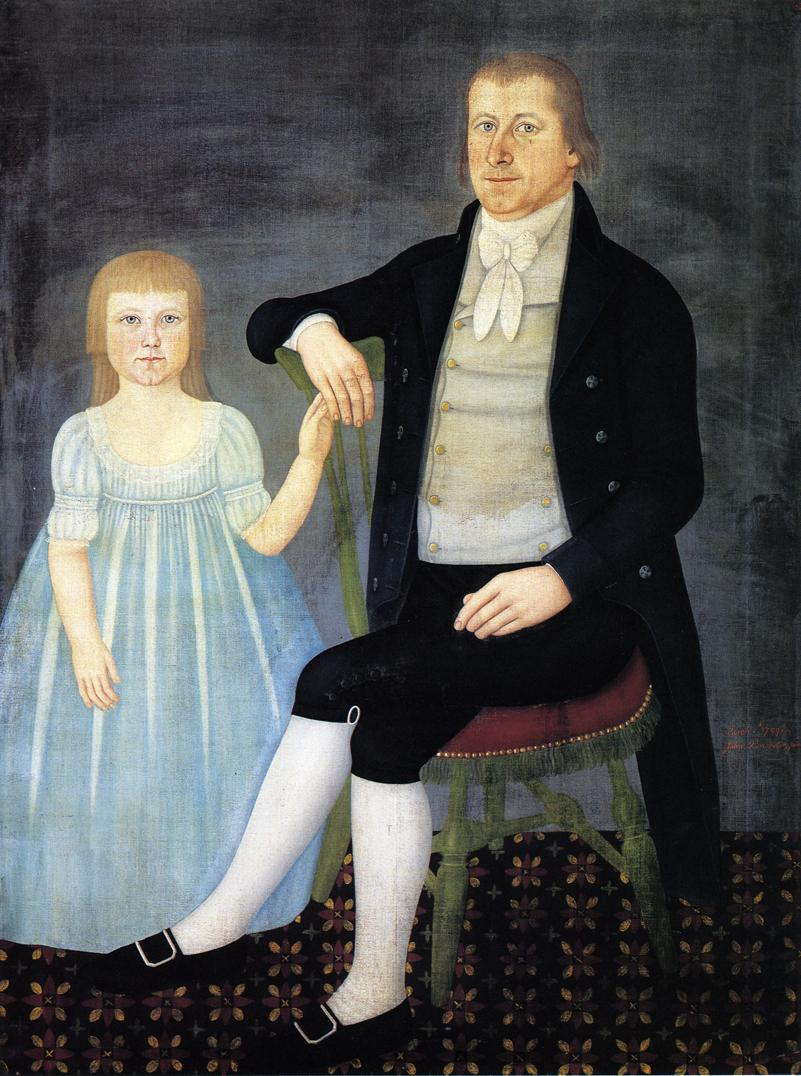
Comfort Starr Mygatt and His Daughter Lucy, 1799

- Genocchio, Ben. "Art Review: Portraits in the Grand Style, Just a Little Skewed." New York Times, Sunday, July 29, 2006, "Connecticut and the Region" section, page CT 10, accessed August 7, 2006.
- D'Ambrosio, Paul S. "A Deaf Artist in Early America: The Worlds of John Brewster Jr." Folk Art 31, no. 3 (fall 2006): 38–49.
- Hollander, Stacy C., and Brooke Davis Anderson. American Anthem: Masterworks from the American Folk Art Museum. New York: American Folk Art Museum in association with Harry N. Abrams, Inc., 2001.
- Lane, Harlan. A Deaf Artist in Early America: The Worlds of John Brewster Jr. Boston: Beacon Press, 2004.
