= Moses-Kent House =

Historic house in New Hampshire, United States

- U.S. National Register of Historic Places
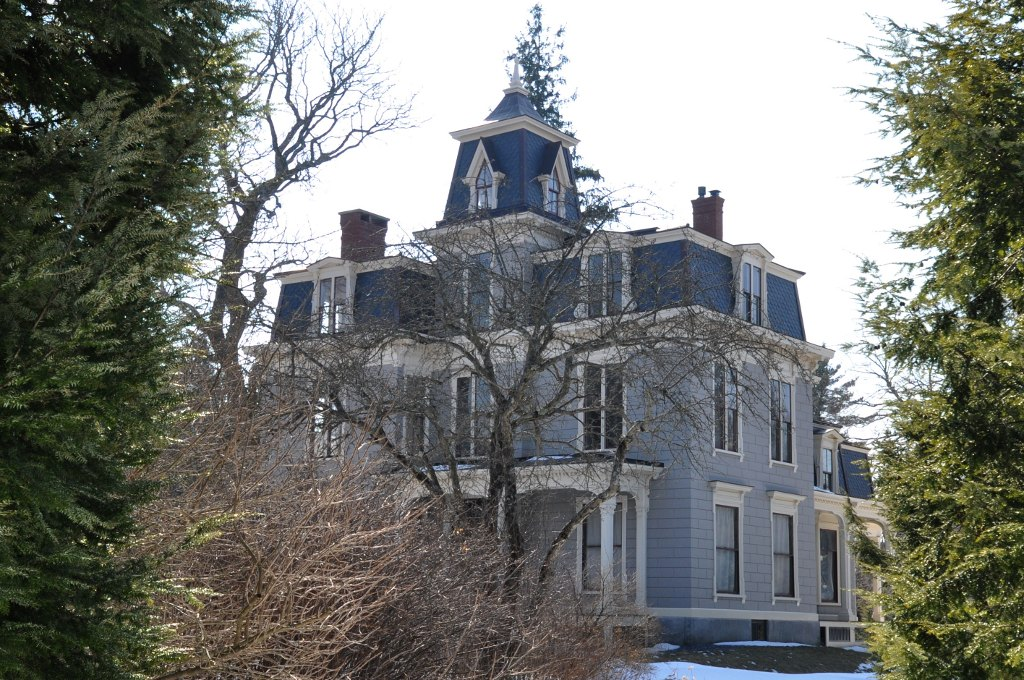
- Moses-Kent House

- Location within New Hampshire Location within the United States
- Location: 1 Pine St., Exeter, New Hampshire
- Coordinates: 42°58′36″N 70°57′18″W
- Area: 5.5 acres (2.2 ha)
- Built: 1868
- Architect: Rufus Sargent
- Architectural style: Second Empire, Italianate
- NRHP reference No.: 85002184
- Added to NRHP: September 12, 1985

The Moses-Kent House is a historic house at 1 Pine Street in Exeter, New Hampshire. Built in 1868 for a prominent local merchant, it is one of the town's finest examples of Victorian residential architecture. It was added to the National Register of Historic Places on September 12, 1985.

== Description and history ==
The Moses-Kent House stands southwest of the town center of Exeter, at the southwest junction of Linden and Pine Streets. It occupies a large lot, more than 5 acres (2.0 ha) in size, of which about 2 acres (0.81 ha) are landscaped. The main house is a 2 1/2-story wood-frame structure, with a mansard roof, granite foundation, and an exterior finished in wooden siding scored to resemble ashlar stone. It is predominantly Second Empire in its styling, with strong Italianate influence. Its most prominent feature is a three-story tower with mansard roof and windows whose molded surrounds match those of the main mansard roof. The property includes a surviving 1868 carriage house. The interior of the house is well-preserved, retaining features from its construction, and from a later early 20th-century renovation.

The house was built in 1868 by Henry Clay Moses, a local wool merchant, who purchased two lots and demolished the buildings standing on them to make way for it. Moses hired architect Rufus Sargent of Newburyport, Massachusetts to design the house, and landscape architect Robert Morris Copeland was hired to lay out the grounds. Moses was known locally for his philanthropy, and opened portions of the property to the public as a park. It underwent significant alterations c. 1901-02 after it was purchased by George Kent, owner of the Exeter Manufacturing Company. The landscaping of its grounds are conjectured without evidence to have been influenced (directly or indirectly) by the work of Frederick Law Olmsted.

== See also ==
- National Register of Historic Places listings in Rockingham County, New Hampshire
