= Peabody Civic Center Historic District =

Historic district in Massachusetts, United States

- U.S. National Register of Historic Places
- U.S. Historic district
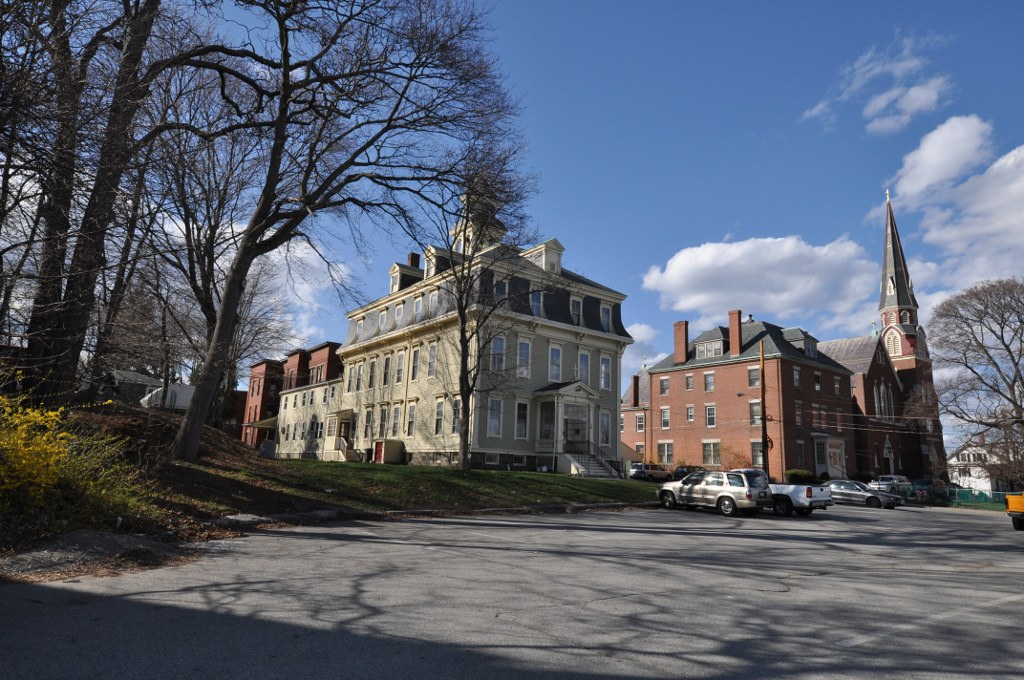
- Civic Center

- Location within Massachusetts Location within the United States
- Location: Peabody, Massachusetts
- Coordinates: 42°31′32″N 70°55′48″W
- Area: 10 acres (4.0 ha)
- Architect: Multiple
- Architectural style: Greek Revival, Late Victorian, Italianate
- NRHP reference No.: 80000477
- Added to NRHP: November 25, 1980

The Peabody Civic Center Historic District encompasses a well-preserved portion of the historic center of Peabody, Massachusetts. Extending along Chestnut and Franklin Streets south of Peabody City Hall, the district includes a small residential area built in the mid-19th century, as well as the city hall and St. JOhn the Baptist Roman Catholic Church, two monumental structures defining the town's civic heart. The district was added to the National Register of Historic Places in 1980.

== Description and history ==
The city of Peabody was originally part of Salem, and was, after a series of political divisions, incorporated separately as South Danvers in 1855. It was renamed Peabody, after philanthropist George Peabody, in 1868, and was reincorporated as a city in 1911. The area where the city center developed was settled as early as 1634, when a grist mill was built on Proctor Brook north of what is now Lowell Street. A church was built on the south side of Lowell Street in 1711, and open land to its south was used as a commons and militia training ground. The area developed residentially in the 1840s, when Lowell Street (not part of the district except City Hall) was lined with small businesses such as shoe shops, resulting in a collection of Greek Revival and Italianate houses. The area's significance as the city center was cemented with the construction in the 1870s of St. John's, an imposing Victorian Gothic brick building, and the 1880s construction of City Hall, a 3-1/2 story Second Empire building.

The historic district is anchored at its northeastern corner by City Hall, and is roughly L shape extending south and then west from there. It includes housing along Chestnut Street between Lowell and Franklin Street, and along Franklin between Chestnut and School Streets. To the west of City Hall, it includes the main St. John's edifice, as well as the associated rectory and convent.

== See also ==
- National Register of Historic Places listings in Essex County, Massachusetts
