= Institution for Savings =

Bank in Massachusetts, U.S.

Institution for Savings in Newburyport and Its Vicinity
- Company type: Mutual organization
- Industry: Banking
- Founded: January 31, 1820; 206 years ago
- Headquarters: Newburyport, Massachusetts
- Key people: Michael J. Jones, CEO
- Website: www.institutionforsavings.com

Institution for Savings in Newburyport and Its Vicinity is a bank based in Newburyport, Massachusetts. It has 15 branches, all of which are in Essex County, Massachusetts. It is a mutual organization.

== History ==
The bank was founded in 1820.

In August 2014, the company acquired Rockport National Bank, which had 4 branches, for $28.3 million in cash.

As of December 31, 2019, it had $3.7 billion in deposits.
