= Newburyport Historic District =

Historic district in Massachusetts, United States

- U.S. National Register of Historic Places
- U.S. Historic district
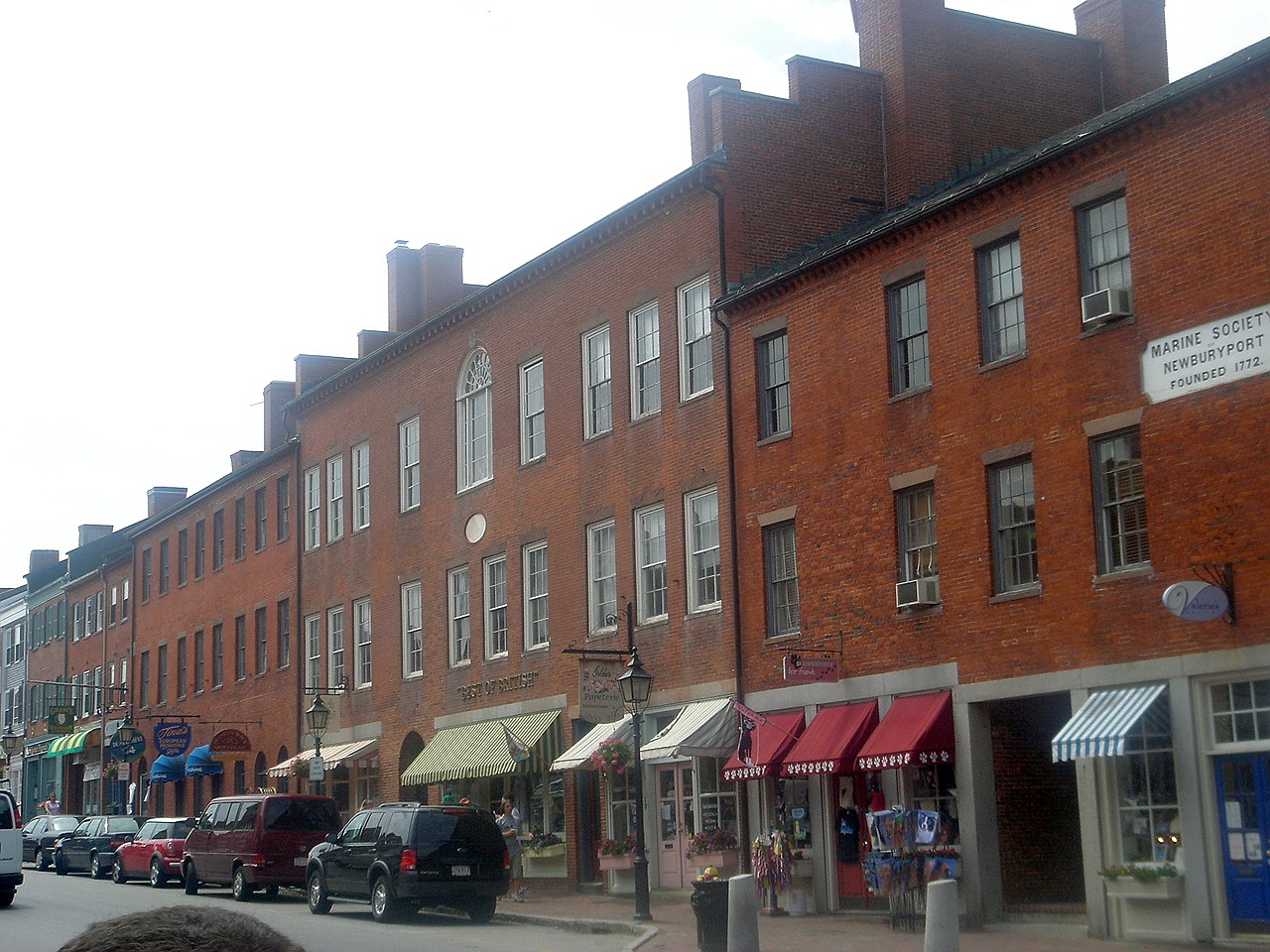
- Buildings along State Street in the historic district

- Location within Massachusetts Location within the United States
- Location: Roughly bounded by High, Marlboro, Water, Merrimac, and Ashland Sts., Newburyport, Massachusetts
- Coordinates: 42°48′41″N 70°52′40″W
- Area: 750 acres (300 ha)
- Architect: Charles Bulfinch; Arthur Gilman; Robert Mills; Timothy Palmer; Rufus Sargent et al.
- Architectural style: Greek Revival, Late Victorian, Federal
- NRHP reference No.: 84002411
- Added to NRHP: August 2, 1984

The Newburyport Historic District encompasses most of the historic downtown area of Newburyport, Massachusetts. It is roughly bounded by the Merrimack River, Marlboro Street, Ashland Street and High Streets. Covering some 750 acres (300 ha) of land and more than 2,500 contributing buildings, it includes the most populous part of the city, and a panoply of architectural styles, dating from the 17th century to the early 20th century. The district was added to the National Register of Historic Places in 1984.

== Description and history ==
The city of Newburyport is located on the south bank of the Merrimack River in northeastern Massachusetts. Its downtown area is located a short way inland from the Gulf of Maine, along a stretch of the river that flows southeast toward a large harbor area. What is now a somewhat dense grid of streets extends from Ashland Street in the northwest to Marlboro Street in the southeast, bounded on the southwest by High Street, located at the crest of a low ridge that parallels the river. This basic road network dates to the 17th century. It is roughly bisected by United States Route 1, which is briefly a limited access roadway as it passes through the area. The commercial downtown area is east of US 1 and near the river, with predominantly residential areas to the west, east and south.

The historic district is dominated by Federal period architecture in both its residential and commercial areas, owing to the city's principal period of prosperity, which came to an end with the advent of the War of 1812, which disrupted the trading activities of its seafaring merchants. It includes a number of properties previously listed on the National Register, including the former US Custom House (now a museum), the main post office, and the National Historic Landmark Caleb Cushing House. A particularly fine series of Federal mansions are to be found on High Street. It also has a substantial amount of residential architecture of the later 19th century, although this tends to be more vernacular in style, as it accompanied the rise of a lower industrial working class in the community.

The district includes works by a number of nationally significant architects, including Charles Bulfinch, Arthur Gilman and Robert Mills. Additionally, the district includes a number of works by Rufus Sargent, the leading local architect, and Timothy Palmer, a civil engineer.

== See also ==
- National Register of Historic Places listings in Essex County, Massachusetts
