= 2000 United States presidential election in Massachusetts =

- November 7, 2000
- Turnout: 68.20% (▼6.91)

Nominee	Al Gore	George W. Bush	Ralph Nader
Party	Democratic	Republican	Green
Home state	Tennessee	Texas	Connecticut
Running mate	Joe Lieberman	Dick Cheney	Winona LaDuke
Electoral vote	12	0	0
Popular vote	1,616,487	878,502	173,564
Percentage	59.80%	32.50%	6.42%

Gore
40–50%
50–60%
60–70%
70–80%
80–90%
Bush
40–50%
50–60%
President before election
Bill Clinton
Democratic
Elected President
George W. Bush
Republican

The 2000 United States presidential election in Massachusetts took place on November 7, 2000, and was part of the 2000 United States presidential election. Voters chose 12 representatives, or electors to the Electoral College, who voted for president and vice president.

Massachusetts is one of the most reliable blue states in the nation: no Republican has won the state since Ronald Reagan in 1984. Massachusetts had been a Democratic-leaning state since 1928 and a Democratic stronghold since 1960, and has maintained sizable Democratic margins since 1996. Gore handily won Massachusetts by a 27% margin against George W. Bush; neither candidate actively campaigned in the state, although the wives of the Democratic candidates, Tipper Gore and Hadassah Lieberman, held a rally in Lieberman's hometown of Gardner. Gore won every county and congressional district.

Bush became the first Republican ever to win the White House without carrying Barnstable County. As of 2024, this is the last time that a Democratic presidential nominee has failed to reach 60 percent of the vote in Massachusetts. This is also the last time that the towns of Ashby, Charlton, Douglas, East Bridgewater, Middleborough, Middleton, Lakeville, and North Brookfield voted Democratic in a presidential election, and the last time that the towns of Chatham, Chesterfield, Orleans, Otis, and Rowe voted Republican, and the first time since 1944 where the city of Attleboro failed to vote for the winner of the presidential election.

With 6.42% of the popular vote, Massachusetts proved to be Ralph Nader's third-best state in the 2000 election after Alaska and neighboring Vermont. Nader received 36.2% of the vote in the town of Wendell.

== General election ==
=== Polling ===
Poll source	Date(s)	Sample size	Margin of error	George W. Bush (R)	Al Gore (D)	Ralph Nader (G)	Other / undecided (Note: Calculated by taking the difference of 100% and all other candidates combined.)
Harris Insights & Analytics	November 3, 2000	5,141	—	32%	58%	8%	2%
University of Massachusetts Department of Political Science	October 27, 2000	401 (RV)	—	30%	52%	7%	11%
KRC Research	October 25, 2000	400	—	28%	54%	7%	11%
RKM Research and Communications Inc.	October 25, 2000	400	—	28%	52%	5%	15%

=== Results ===
2000 United States presidential election in Massachusetts
Party	Candidate	Votes	Percentage	Electoral votes
Democratic	Albert A. Gore Jr. and Joseph I. Lieberman	1,616,487	59.80%	12
Republican	George W. Bush and Richard B. Cheney	878,502	32.50%	0
Green	Ralph Nader and Winona LaDuke	173,564	6.42%	0
Libertarian	Harry Browne	16,366	0.61%	0
Reform	Pat Buchanan	11,149	0.41%	0
Independent	Others (Write-In)	3,990	0.15%	0
Independent (a)	John Hagelin (Note: John Hagelin was the candidate of the Natural Law Party nationally.)	2,884	0.11%	0
Socialist	David McReynolds (Write-In)	42	0.15%	0
Totals		2,702,984	100.0%	12

==== By county ====
County	Al Gore Democratic		George W. Bush Republican		Various candidates Other parties		Margin		Total votes cast
County	#	%	#	%	#	%	#	%	Total votes cast
Barnstable	62,363	51.50%	49,686	41.03%	9,037	7.46%	12,677	10.47%	121,086
Berkshire	37,934	63.85%	15,805	26.60%	5,672	9.55%	22,129	37.25%	59,411
Bristol	136,325	64.51%	62,848	29.74%	12,164	5.76%	73,477	34.77%	211,337
Dukes	5,474	61.81%	2,315	26.14%	1,067	12.05%	3,159	35.67%	8,856
Essex	178,400	57.49%	110,010	35.45%	21,923	7.06%	68,390	22.04%	310,333
Franklin	17,945	53.78%	10,176	30.50%	5,245	15.72%	7,769	23.28%	33,366
Hampden	100,103	58.17%	59,558	34.61%	12,432	7.22%	40,545	23.56%	172,093
Hampshire	38,543	56.16%	19,202	27.98%	10,881	15.86%	19,341	28.18%	68,626
Middlesex	404,043	61.49%	198,914	30.27%	54,091	8.23%	205,129	31.22%	657,048
Nantucket	2,874	58.34%	1,624	32.97%	428	8.69%	1,250	25.37%	4,926
Norfolk	188,450	59.41%	107,033	33.75%	21,694	6.84%	81,417	25.66%	317,177
Plymouth	115,376	54.53%	82,751	39.11%	13,450	6.36%	32,625	15.42%	211,577
Suffolk	154,888	71.38%	44,441	20.48%	17,671	8.14%	110,447	50.90%	217,000
Worcester	173,769	56.03%	114,139	36.80%	22,240	7.17%	59,630	19.23%	310,148
Totals	1,616,487	59.80%	878,502	32.50%	207,995	7.70%	737,985	27.30%	2,702,984

==== By congressional district ====
Gore won all ten congressional districts.

District	Gore	Bush	Nader	Representative
1st	57%	33%	9%	John Olver
2nd	58%	34%	6%	Richard Neal
3rd	58%	35%	6%	Jim McGovern
4th	63%	30%	5%	Barney Frank
5th	56%	36%	6%	Marty Meehan
6th	57%	36%	6%	John F. Tierney
7th	63%	29%	6%	Ed Markey
8th	72%	17%	9%	Mike Capuano
9th	62%	31%	6%	Joe Moakley
9th	62%	31%	6%	Stephen Lynch
10th	55%	38%	6%	Bill Delahunt

== See also ==
- United States presidential elections in Massachusetts
