= 1984 United States presidential election in Massachusetts =

- November 6, 1984
- Turnout: 79.75% (▼1.56%)

Nominee	Ronald Reagan	Walter Mondale
Party	Republican	Democratic
Home state	California	Minnesota
Running mate	George H. W. Bush	Geraldine Ferraro
Electoral vote	13	0
Popular vote	1,310,936	1,239,606
Percentage	51.22%	48.43%

Reagan
40–50%
50–60%
60–70%
70–80%
Mondale
40–50%
50–60%
60–70%
70–80%
80–90%
President before election
Ronald Reagan
Republican
Elected President
Ronald Reagan
Republican

The 1984 United States presidential election in Massachusetts took place on November 6, 1984, as part of the 1984 United States presidential election, which was held throughout all 50 states and D.C. Voters chose 13 representatives, or electors, to the Electoral College, who voted for president and vice president.

Massachusetts narrowly voted for incumbent Republican President Ronald Reagan of California over his Democratic challenger, former Vice President Walter Mondale of Minnesota. Reagan ran with incumbent Vice President George H. W. Bush of Texas, while Mondale's running mate was Congresswoman Geraldine Ferraro of New York.

On election day, Reagan won 51.22% of the vote in the state to Mondale's 48.43%, a margin of 2.79%. Massachusetts had been a Democratic-leaning state since 1928, and a Democratic stronghold since 1960. In 1972, Massachusetts was the only state in the nation to vote for Democrat George McGovern over Republican Richard Nixon in the latter's 49-state landslide. However, in 1980, Reagan had won the state for the GOP for the first time since 1956 in a 3-way race with a plurality of only 41.90% and a razor-thin margin of 0.15%. Thus in a 1984 head-to-head match-up, Massachusetts was one of the few states whose outcome remained in doubt as Reagan appeared poised for a convincing win nationwide.

Ultimately, in the midst of a decisive nationwide Republican landslide, Reagan would narrowly triumph in Massachusetts, as he did in 48 other states, leaving Mondale to win only his home state of Minnesota and the District of Columbia. Reagan's win was the first time a Republican had won an absolute majority of the popular vote in Massachusetts since 1956, although it was still Reagan's narrowest win in the nation, thus making it the second most Democratic state after Minnesota. Massachusetts was about 16% more Democratic than the national average in the 1984 election. Mondale's 48.43% of the vote marked his best result in a state he did not carry.

Reagan carried nine counties in Massachusetts to Mondale's five. Reagan's strongest county was suburban Plymouth County, where he took 60.2% of the vote. Mondale's strongest county win was Suffolk County, home to the state's capital and largest city, Boston, where he took 62.3% of the vote.

To date, this is the last time a Republican candidate for President has won Massachusetts, as well as the last time the cities of Quincy, Taunton, and Waltham and the towns of Clarksburg, Falmouth, Lanesborough, Lee, Mashpee, Nantucket, and Natick voted Republican.

== Democratic primary ==
Jesse Jackson's voters were 80% white, 16% black, 4% were members of other groups. Massachusetts was the only state where a majority of his voters were white. 30% of Jackson voters listed Hart as their second candidate in exit polls conducted by CBS News and The New York Times' while 24% listed Mondale, 22% listed Mondale, and 19% selected none.

== Results ==
1984 United States presidential election in Massachusetts
Party	Candidate	Votes	Percentage	Electoral votes
Republican	Ronald Reagan (incumbent)	1,310,936	51.22%	13
Democratic	Walter Mondale	1,239,606	48.43%	0
New Alliance	Dennis L. Serrette	7,998	0.31%	0
Write-ins	Write-ins	913	0.04%	0
Totals		2,559,453	100.00%	13
Voter turnout (voting age/registered)				58%/79%

=== Results by county ===
County	Ronald Reagan Republican		Walter Mondale Democratic		Various candidates Other parties		Margin		Total votes cast
County	#	%	#	%	#	%	#	%	Total votes cast
Barnstable	51,261	56.99%	38,369	42.66%	321	0.35%	13,252	14.33%	89,951
Berkshire	33,712	52.85%	29,745	46.63%	328	0.52%	3,967	6.22%	63,785
Bristol	93,232	49.58%	94,010	49.99%	797	0.43%	-778	-0.41%	188,039
Dukes	2,788	45.52%	3,313	54.09%	24	0.39%	-525	-8.57%	6,125
Essex	162,152	54.84%	132,353	44.77%	1,151	0.39%	29,799	10.07%	295,656
Franklin	15,883	50.37%	15,502	49.16%	148	0.47%	381	1.21%	31,533
Hampden	89,330	51.05%	84,985	48.57%	656	0.38%	4,345	2.48%	174,971
Hampshire	28,111	43.96%	35,597	55.67%	234	0.37%	-7,486	-11.71%	63,942
Middlesex	319,604	49.42%	325,065	50.26%	2,085	0.32%	-5,461	-0.84%	646,754
Nantucket	1,697	53.53%	1,456	45.93%	17	0.54%	241	7.60%	3,170
Norfolk	160,313	53.56%	138,222	46.18%	784	0.26%	22,091	7.38%	299,319
Plymouth	105,230	60.21%	68,923	39.44%	618	0.35%	36,307	20.77%	174,771
Suffolk	91,563	37.37%	152,568	62.27%	866	0.36%	-61,005	-24.90%	244,997
Worcester	156,060	56.45%	119,498	43.23%	882	0.32%	36,562	13.22%	276,440
Totals	1,310,936	51.22%	1,239,606	48.43%	8,911	0.35%	71,330	2.79%	2,559,453

==== Counties that flipped from Democratic to Republican ====
- Berkshire
- Hampden

=== Results by congressional district ===
Reagan won eight of 11 congressional districts, including seven held by Democrats.

District	Reagan	Mondale	Representative
1st	51%	49%	Silvio O. Conte
2nd	53%	46%	Edward Boland
3rd	57%	43%	Joseph D. Early
4th	48%	52%	Barney Frank
5th	57%	43%	James Shannon
5th	57%	43%	Chester G. Atkins
6th	55%	45%	Nicholas Mavroules
7th	50%	50%	Ed Markey
8th	36%	64%	Tip O'Neill
9th	48%	52%	Joe Moakley
10th	55%	45%	Gerry Studds
11th	52%	48%	Brian J. Donnelly

== See also ==
- Presidency of Ronald Reagan
- United States presidential elections in Massachusetts

== Works cited ==
- Ranney, Austin, ed. (1985). The American Elections of 1984. Duke University Press. ISBN 0822302306.
