= 1876 United States presidential election in Massachusetts =

- November 7, 1876
- Turnout: 72.3% ▲10.3 pp
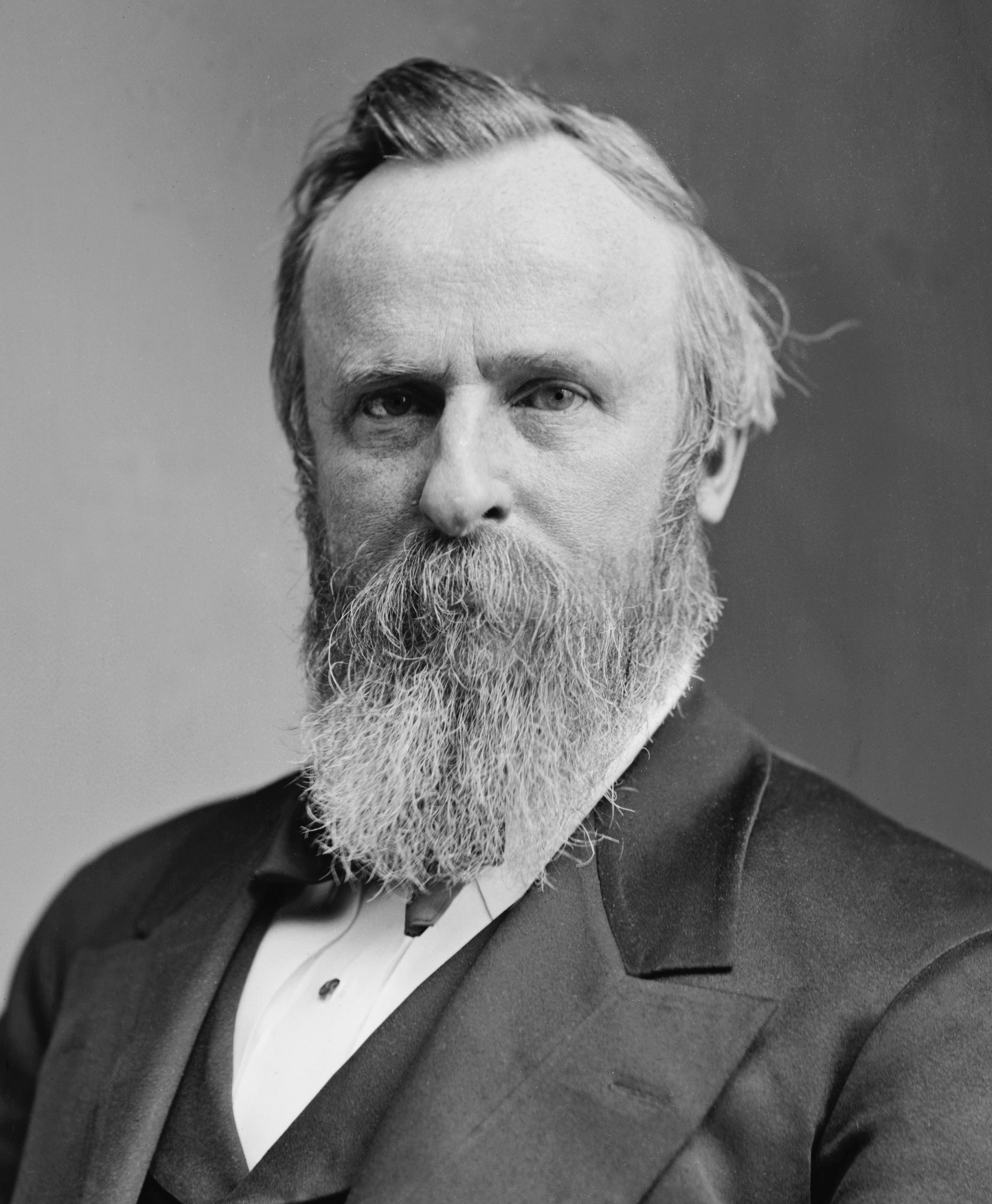

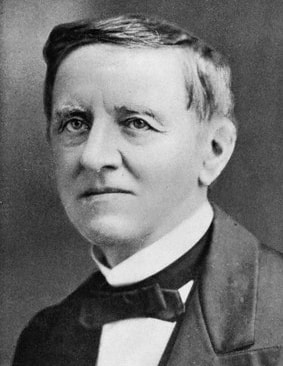
Nominee	Rutherford B. Hayes	Samuel J. Tilden
Party	Republican	Democratic
Home state	Ohio	New York
Running mate	William A. Wheeler	Thomas A. Hendricks
Electoral vote	13	0
Popular vote	150,064	108,777
Percentage	57.80%	41.90%

Hayes
50–60%
60–70%
70–80%
80–90%
90–100%
Tilden
50–60%
60–70%
President before election
Ulysses S. Grant
Republican
Elected President
Rutherford B. Hayes
Republican

The 1876 United States presidential election in Massachusetts took place on November 7, 1876, as part of the 1876 United States presidential election. Voters chose 13 representatives, or electors to the Electoral College, who voted for president and vice president.

Massachusetts voted for the Republican nominee, Rutherford B. Hayes, over the Democratic nominee, Samuel J. Tilden. Hayes won the state by a margin of 15.90%.

== Results ==
1876 United States presidential election in Massachusetts
Party	Candidate	Running mate	Popular vote		Electoral vote	
Party	Candidate	Running mate	Count	%	Count	%
Republican	Rutherford B. Hayes of Ohio	William A. Wheeler of New York	150,064	57.80%	13	100.00%
Democratic	Samuel J. Tilden of New York	Thomas A. Hendricks of Indiana	108,777	41.90%	0	0.00%
N/A	Others	Others	779	0.30%	0	0.00%
Total			259,620	100.00%	13	100.00%

== See also ==
- United States presidential elections in Massachusetts
