= United States presidential elections in Massachusetts =

Presidential elections in Massachusetts
- Number of elections: 60
- Voted Democratic: 22
- Voted Republican: 21
- Voted Whig: 5
- Voted Democratic-Republican: 5
- Voted Federalist: 5
- Voted other: 2 (Note: George Washington, 1788-89, 1792.)
- Voted for winning candidate: 38
- Voted for losing candidate: 22

Following is a table of United States presidential elections in Massachusetts, ordered by year. Since its admission to statehood in 1788, Massachusetts has participated in every U.S. presidential election.

Winners of the state are in bold. The shading refers to the state winner, and not the national winner.

== Elections from 1864 to present ==
From 1864 to 1924, Massachusetts was a reliably Republican state, going Democratic only in the election of 1912 where the Republican Party was split. However, the increased strength of the Irish Catholic voting bloc led the state to support Al Smith in 1928 and Franklin D. Roosevelt in all four of his elections. Since 1956, Ronald Reagan (in 1980 and 1984) has been the only Republican to carry Massachusetts.

Year	Winner (nationally)	Votes	Percent	Runner-up (nationally)	Votes	Percent	Other national candidates (Note: For purposes of these lists, other national candidates are defined as those who won at least one electoral vote, or won at least ten percent of the vote in multiple states.)	Votes	Percent	Electoral votes	Notes
2024	Donald Trump	1,251,303	36.02	**Kamala Harris**	2,126,518	61.22	—			11	
2020	**Joe Biden**	2,382,202	65.60	Donald Trump	1,167,202	32.14	—			11	
2016	Donald Trump (Note: Won the electoral college while losing the popular vote)	1,090,893	32.81	**Hillary Clinton**	1,995,196	60.01	—			11	
2012	**Barack Obama**	1,921,290	60.65	Mitt Romney	1,188,314	37.51	—			11	
2008	**Barack Obama**	1,904,097	61.80	John McCain	1,108,854	35.99	—			12	
2004	George W. Bush	1,071,109	36.78	**John Kerry**	1,803,800	61.94	—			12	
2000	George W. Bush	878,502	32.50	**Al Gore**	1,616,487	59.80	Ralph Nader	173,564	6.42	12	
1996	**Bill Clinton**	1,571,763	61.47	Bob Dole	718,107	28.09	Ross Perot	227,217	8.89	12	
1992	**Bill Clinton**	1,318,662	47.54	George H. W. Bush	805,049	29.03	Ross Perot	632,312	22.8	12	
1988	George H. W. Bush	1,194,644	45.38	**Michael Dukakis**	1,401,406	53.23	—			13	
1984	**Ronald Reagan**	1,310,936	51.22	Walter Mondale	1,239,606	48.43	—			13	
1980	**Ronald Reagan**	1,057,631	41.90	Jimmy Carter	1,053,802	41.75	John B. Anderson	382,539	15.15	14	
1976	**Jimmy Carter**	1,429,475	56.11	Gerald Ford	1,030,276	40.44	—			14	
1972	Richard Nixon	1,112,078	45.23	**George McGovern**	1,332,540	54.20	—			14	
1968	Richard Nixon	766,844	32.89	**Hubert Humphrey**	1,469,218	63.01	George Wallace	87,088	3.73	14	
1964	**Lyndon B. Johnson**	1,786,422	76.19	Barry Goldwater	549,727	23.44	—			14	
1960	**John F. Kennedy**	1,487,174	60.22	Richard Nixon	976,750	39.55	—			16	
1956	**Dwight D. Eisenhower**	1,393,197	59.32	Adlai Stevenson II	948,190	40.37	T. Coleman Andrews/ Unpledged Electors (Note: Was allied with a slate of unpledged electors in Louisiana, Mississippi and South Carolina)	—	—	16	
1952	**Dwight D. Eisenhower**	1,292,325	54.22	Adlai Stevenson II	1,083,525	45.46	—			16	
1948	**Harry S. Truman**	1,151,788	54.66	Thomas E. Dewey	909,370	43.16	Strom Thurmond	—	—	16	
1944	**Franklin D. Roosevelt**	1,035,296	52.80	Thomas E. Dewey	921,350	46.99	—			16	
1940	**Franklin D. Roosevelt**	1,076,522	53.11	Wendell Willkie	939,700	46.36	—			17	
1936	**Franklin D. Roosevelt**	942,716	51.22	Alf Landon	768,613	41.76	—			17	
1932	**Franklin D. Roosevelt**	800,148	50.64	Herbert Hoover	736,959	46.64	—			17	
1928	Herbert Hoover	775,566	49.15	**Al Smith**	792,758	50.24	—			18	
1924	**Calvin Coolidge**	703,476	62.26	John W. Davis	280,831	24.86	Robert M. La Follette	141,225	12.50	18	
1920	**Warren G. Harding**	681,153	68.55	James M. Cox	276,691	27.84	Parley P. Christensen	—	—	18	
1916	Woodrow Wilson	247,885	46.61	**Charles E. Hughes**	268,784	50.54	—			18	
1912	**Woodrow Wilson**	173,408	35.53	Theodore Roosevelt	142,228	29.14	William H. Taft	155,948	31.95	18	
1908	**William H. Taft**	265,966	58.21	William Jennings Bryan	155,543	34.04	—			16	
1904	**Theodore Roosevelt**	257,822	57.92	Alton B. Parker	165,746	37.24	—			16	
1900	**William McKinley**	238,866	57.59	William Jennings Bryan	156,997	37.85	—			15	
1896	**William McKinley**	278,976	69.47	William Jennings Bryan	105,711	26.32	—			15	
1892	Grover Cleveland	176,813	45.22	**Benjamin Harrison**	202,814	51.87	James B. Weaver	3,210	0.82	15	
1888	**Benjamin Harrison**	183,892	53.42	Grover Cleveland	151,590	44.04	—			14	
1884	Grover Cleveland	122,352	40.33	**James G. Blaine**	146,724	48.36	—			14	
1880	**James A. Garfield**	165,198	58.53	Winfield S. Hancock	111,720	39.58	James B. Weaver	4,548	1.61	13	
1876	**Rutherford B. Hayes**	150,064	57.80	Samuel J. Tilden	108,777	41.90	—			13	
1872	**Ulysses S. Grant**	133,455	69.20	Horace Greeley	59,195	30.69	—			13	
1868	**Ulysses S. Grant**	136,379	69.80	Horatio Seymour	59,103	30.20	—			12	
1864	**Abraham Lincoln**	126,742	72.20	George B. McClellan	48,745	27.80	—			12	

== Election of 1860 ==
The election of 1860 was a complex realigning election in which the breakdown of the previous two-party alignment culminated in four parties each competing for influence in different parts of the country. The result of the election, with the victory of an ardent opponent of slavery, spurred the secession of eleven states and brought about the American Civil War.

Year	Winner (nationally)	Votes	Percent	Runner-up (nationally)	Votes	Percent	Runner-up (nationally)	Votes	Percent	Runner-up (nationally)	Votes	Percent	Electoral votes
1860	**Abraham Lincoln**	106,684	62.9	Stephen A. Douglas	34,370	20.3	John C. Breckinridge	6,163	3.6	John Bell	22,331	13.2	13

== Elections from 1828 to 1856 ==
In all of these elections, Massachusetts went for Whig Party, its predecessor the National Republican Party or its successor the Republican Party

Year	Winner (nationally)	Votes	Percent	Runner-up (nationally)	Votes	Percent	Other national candidates	Votes	Percent	Electoral votes	Notes
1856	James Buchanan	39,244	23.08	**John C. Frémont**	108,172	63.61	Millard Fillmore	19,626	11.54	13	
1852	Franklin Pierce	44,569	35.07	**Winfield Scott**	52,683	41.45	John P. Hale	28,203	22.19	13	
1848	**Zachary Taylor**	61,072	45.32	Lewis Cass	35,281	26.18	Martin Van Buren	38,333	28.45	12	
1844	James K. Polk	53,039	40.17	**Henry Clay**	67,062	50.79	—			12	
1840	**William Henry Harrison**	72,852	57.44	Martin Van Buren	52,355	41.28	—			14	
1836	Martin Van Buren	33,486	44.81	**Daniel Webster**	41,201	55.13	various (Note: Three other candidates ran and received electoral votes nationally as part of the unsuccessful Whig strategy to defeat Martin Van Buren by running four candidates with local appeal in different regions of the country. The others were William Henry Harrison, Hugh Lawson White, and Willie Person Mangum. None of these candidates appeared on the ballot in Massachusetts, whose ballot was the only one where Webster appeared.)			14	
1832	Andrew Jackson	13,933	20.61	**Henry Clay**	31,963	47.27	William Wirt	14,692	21.73	14	
1828	Andrew Jackson	6,012	15.39	**John Quincy Adams**	29,836	76.36	—			15	

== Election of 1824 ==
The election of 1824 was a complex realigning election following the collapse of the prevailing Democratic-Republican Party, resulting in four different candidates each claiming to carry the banner of the party, and competing for influence in different parts of the country. The election was the only one in history to be decided by the House of Representatives under the provisions of the Twelfth Amendment to the United States Constitution after no candidate secured a majority of the electoral vote. It was also the only presidential election in which the candidate who received a plurality of electoral votes (Andrew Jackson) did not become president, a source of great bitterness for Jackson and his supporters, who proclaimed the election of Adams a corrupt bargain.

Year	Winner (nationally)	Votes	Percent	Runner-up (nationally)	Votes	Percent	Runner-up (nationally)	Votes	Percent	Runner-up (nationally)	Votes	Percent	Electoral votes
1824	Andrew Jackson	no ballots		**John Quincy Adams**	30,687	72.97	Henry Clay	no ballots		William H. Crawford	no ballots		15

== Elections from 1788-89 to 1820 ==
In the election of 1820, incumbent President James Monroe ran effectively unopposed, winning all twenty-two of the electoral votes of Massachusetts, and all electoral votes nationwide except one vote in New Hampshire. To the extent that a popular vote was held, it was primarily directed to filling the office of vice president. In every election from 1788-89 to 1816, Maine was a part of Massachusetts and voted with it.

Year	Winner (nationally)	Runner-up (nationally)	Electoral votes	Notes
1820	**James Monroe**	—	15	Monroe effectively ran unopposed.
1816	James Monroe	**Rufus King**	22	
1812	James Madison	**DeWitt Clinton**	22	
1808	James Madison	**Charles C. Pinckney**	19	
1804	**Thomas Jefferson**	Charles C. Pinckney	19	
1800	Thomas Jefferson	**John Adams**	16	
1796	**John Adams**	Thomas Jefferson	16	Adams ran unopposed in Massachusetts
1792	**George Washington**	—	16	Washington effectively ran unopposed.
1788-89	**George Washington**	—	10	Washington effectively ran unopposed.

== See also ==
- Elections in Massachusetts
