= 1880 United States presidential election in Massachusetts =

- November 2, 1880
- Turnout: 71.2% ▼1.1 pp
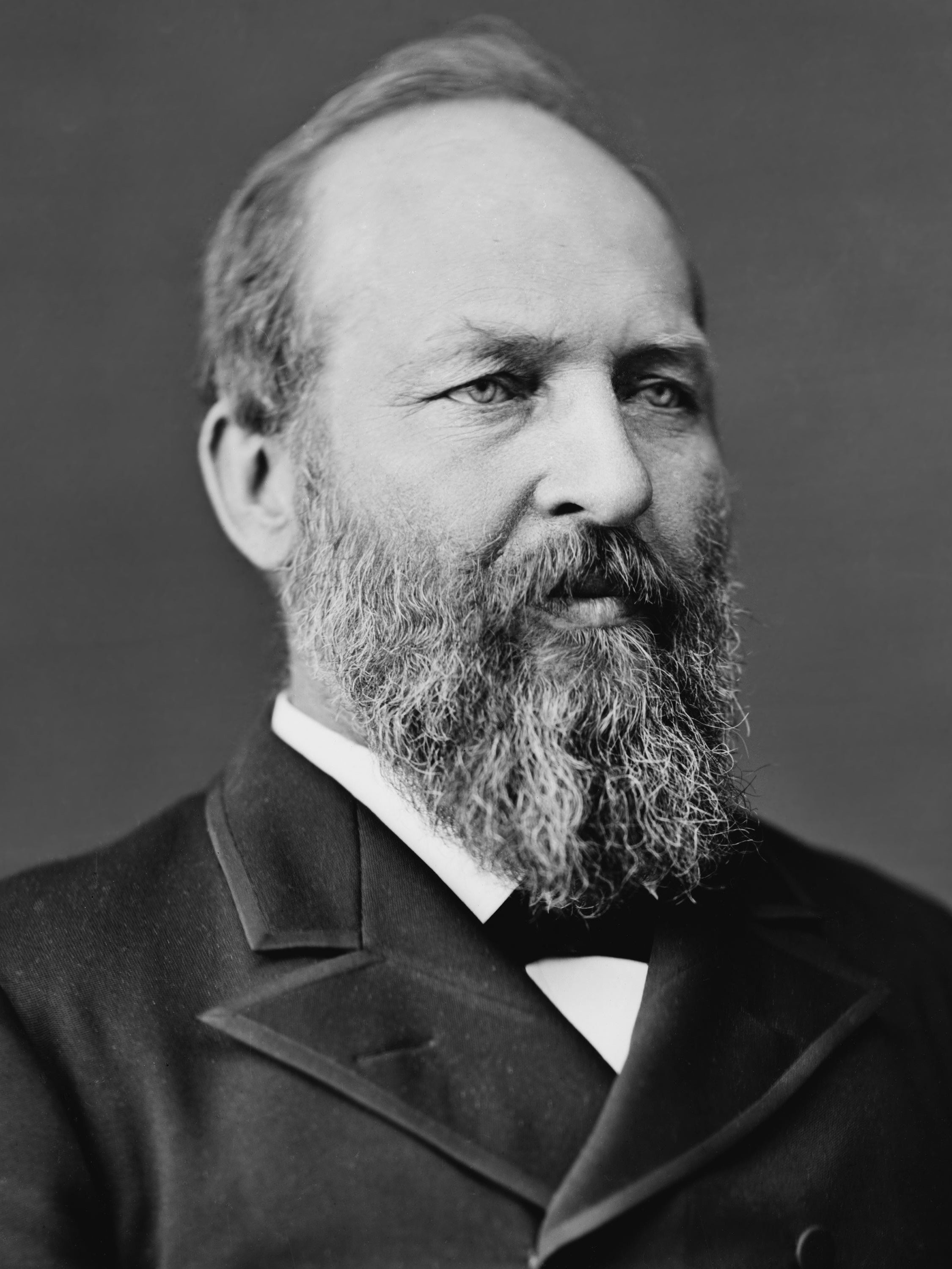

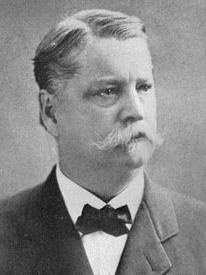
Nominee	James A. Garfield	Winfield Scott Hancock
Party	Republican	Democratic
Home state	Ohio	Pennsylvania
Running mate	Chester A. Arthur	William Hayden English
Electoral vote	13	0
Popular vote	165,198	111,720
Percentage	58.53%	39.58%

Garfield
40–50%
50–60%
60–70%
70–80%
80–90%
90–100%
Hancock
40–50%
50–60%
60–70%
Other
No Vote
President before election
Rutherford B. Hayes
Republican
Elected President
James A. Garfield
Republican

The 1880 United States presidential election in Massachusetts took place on November 2, 1880, as part of the 1880 United States presidential election. Voters chose 13 representatives, or electors to the Electoral College, who voted for president and vice president.

Massachusetts voted for the Republican nominee, James A. Garfield, over the Democratic nominee, Winfield Scott Hancock. Garfield won the state by a margin of 18.95%.

== Results ==
1880 United States presidential election in Massachusetts
Party	Candidate	Running mate	Popular vote		Electoral vote	
Party	Candidate	Running mate	Count	%	Count	%
Republican	James Abram Garfield of Ohio	Chester Alan Arthur of New York	165,198	58.53%	13	100.00%
Democratic	Winfield Scott Hancock of Pennsylvania	William Hayden English of Indiana	111,720	39.58%	0	0.00%
Greenback	James Baird Weaver of Iowa	Barzillai Jefferson Chambers of Texas	4,548	1.61%	0	0.00%
Prohibition	Neal Dow of Maine	Henry Adams Thompson of Ohio	682	0.24%	0	0.00%
N/A	Others	Others	117	0.04%	0	0.00%
Total			282,265	100.00%	13	100.00%

== See also ==
- United States presidential elections in Massachusetts
