= 1824 United States presidential election in Massachusetts =

- October 26 – December 2, 1824
- Turnout: 29.0%
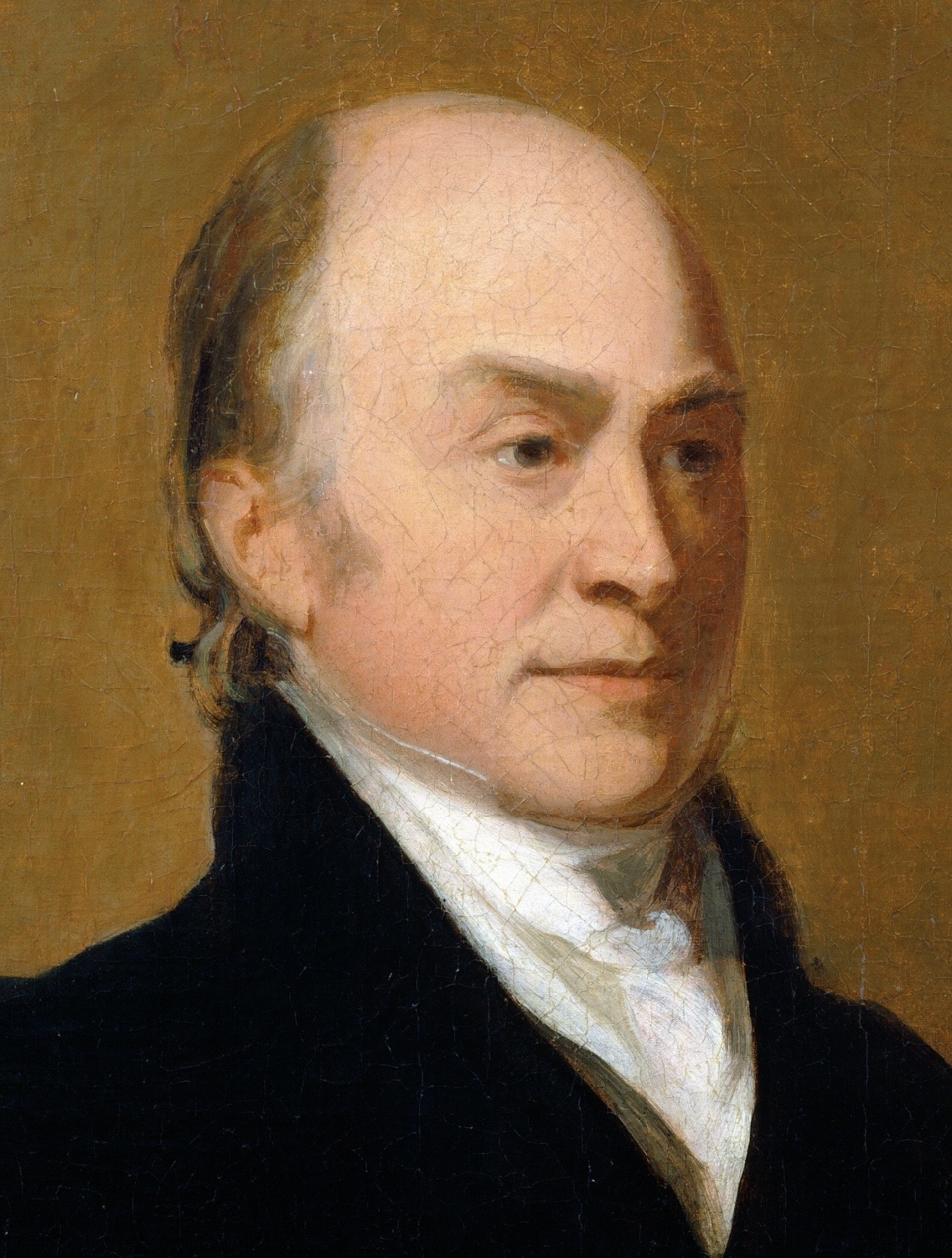

Nominee	John Quincy Adams	Unpledged Massachusetts electors
Party	Democratic-Republican	Democratic-Republican
Home state	Massachusetts	—
Running mate	John C. Calhoun	—
Electoral vote	15	0
Popular vote	30,687	6,616
Percentage	72.97%	15.73%

Adams
50–60%
60–70%
70–80%
80–90%
90–100%
Unpledged (Note: Only Rowley voted for unpledged/anti-Adams electors)
50–60%
No votes
President before election
James Monroe
Democratic-Republican
Elected President
John Quincy Adams
Democratic-Republican

The 1824 United States presidential election in Massachusetts took place between October 26 and December 2, 1824, as part of the 1824 United States presidential election. Voters chose 15 representatives, or electors to the Electoral College, who voted for president and vice president.

During this election, the Democratic-Republican Party was the only major national party, and 4 different candidates from this party sought the presidency. Massachusetts voted for native son John Quincy Adams.

== Results ==
1824 United States presidential election in Massachusetts
Party	Candidate	Votes	Percentage	Electoral votes
Democratic-Republican	John Quincy Adams	30,687	72.97%	15
Democratic-Republican	Unpledged electors	6,616	15.73%	0
N/A	Others	4,753	11.30%	0
Totals		42,056	100.0%	15

== See also ==
- United States presidential elections in Massachusetts
