= 1884 United States presidential election in Massachusetts =

- November 4, 1884
- Turnout: 69.3% ▼1.9 pp
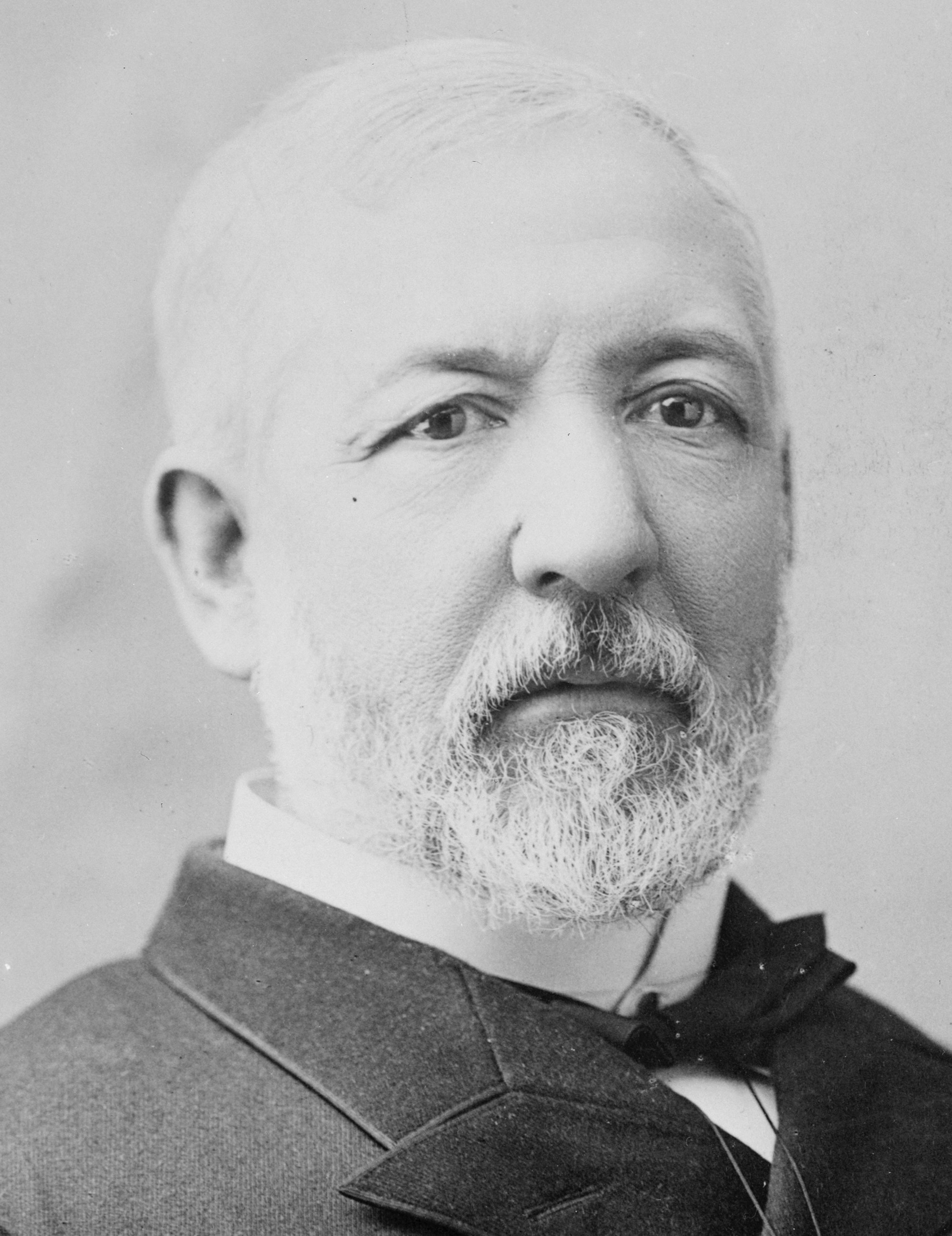

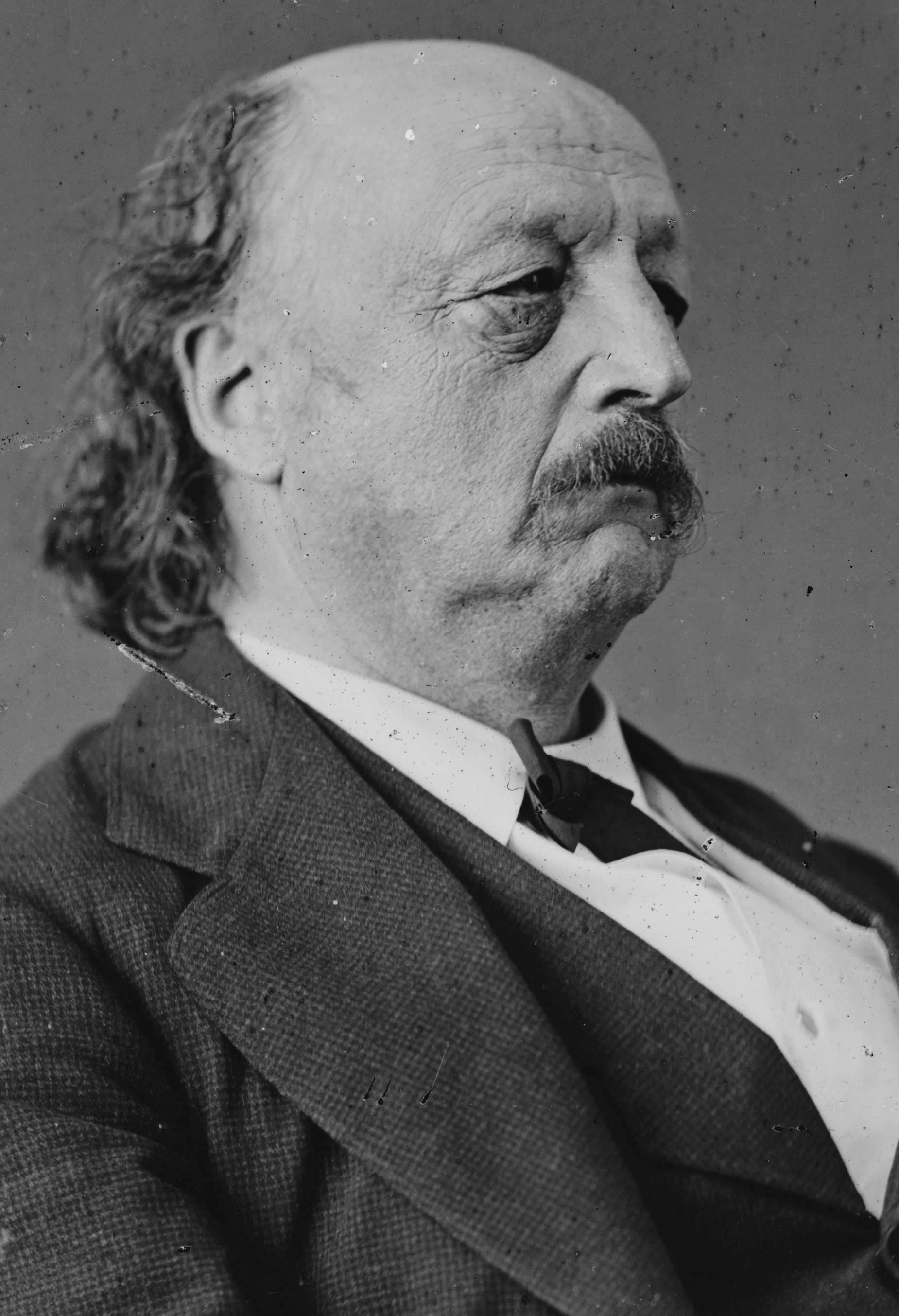
Nominee	James G. Blaine	Grover Cleveland	Benjamin Butler
Party	Republican	Democratic	Greenback
Home state	Maine	New York	Massachusetts
Running mate	John A. Logan	Thomas A. Hendricks	Absolom M. West
Electoral vote	14	0	0
Popular vote	146,724	122,352	24,382
Percentage	48.36%	40.33%	8.04%

Blaine
30–40%
40–50%
50–60%
60–70%
70–80%
80–90%
90–100%
Cleveland
30–40%
40–50%
50–60%
60–70%
Tie
40–50%
President before election
Chester A. Arthur
Republican
Elected President
Grover Cleveland
Democratic

The 1884 United States presidential election in Massachusetts took place on November 4, 1884, as part of the 1884 United States presidential election. Voters chose 14 representatives, or electors to the Electoral College, who voted for president and vice president.

Massachusetts voted for the Republican nominee, James G. Blaine, over the Democratic nominee, Grover Cleveland. Blaine won the state by a margin of 8.03%. Greenback nominee and former Massachusetts governor Benjamin Butler won 8.04% of the vote.

== Results ==
1884 United States presidential election in Massachusetts
Party	Candidate	Running mate	Popular vote		Electoral vote	
Party	Candidate	Running mate	Count	%	Count	%
Republican	James Gillespie Blaine of Maine	John Alexander Logan of Illinois	146,724	48.36%	14	100.00%
Democratic	Grover Cleveland of New York	Thomas Andrews Hendricks of Indiana	122,352	40.33%	0	0.00%
Greenback	Benjamin Franklin Butler of Massachusetts	Absolom Madden West of Mississippi	24,382	8.04%	0	0.00%
Prohibition	John Pierce St. John of Kansas	William Daniel of Maryland	9,923	3.26%	0	0.00%
N/A	Others	Others	2	0.01%	0	0.00%
Total			303,383	100.00%	14	100.00%

== See also ==
- United States presidential elections in Massachusetts
