= 1904 United States presidential election in Massachusetts =

- November 8, 1904
- Turnout: 67.6% ▲0.2 pp
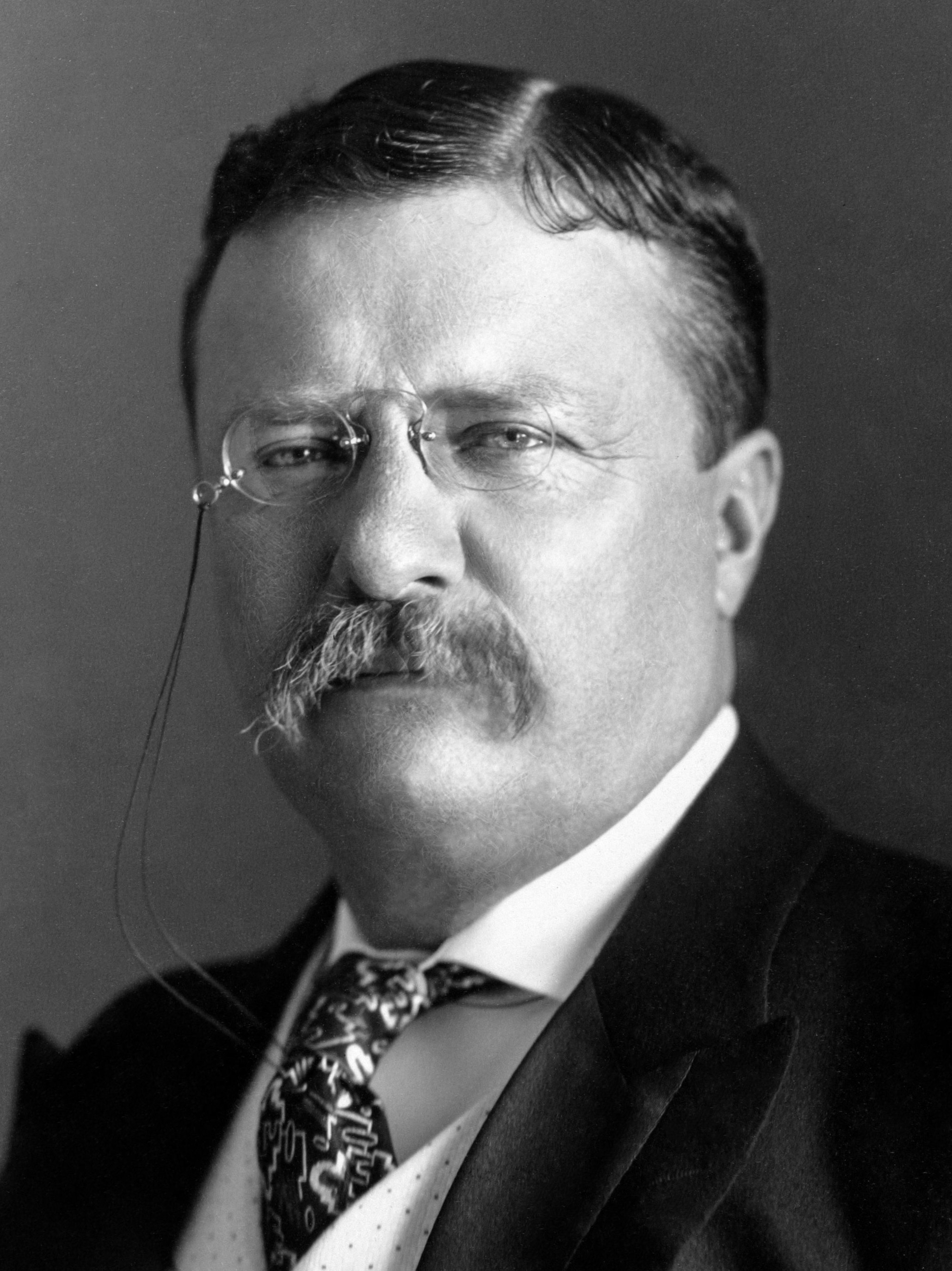

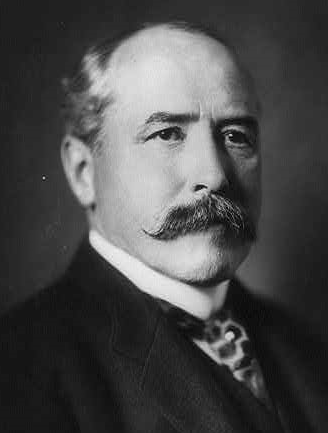
Nominee	Theodore Roosevelt	Alton B. Parker
Party	Republican	Democratic
Home state	New York	New York
Running mate	Charles W. Fairbanks	Henry G. Davis
Electoral vote	16	0
Popular vote	257,822	165,746
Percentage	57.92%	37.24%

Roosevelt
40–50%
50–60%
60–70%
70–80%
80–90%
90–100%
Parker
40–50%
50–60%
60–70%
President before election
Theodore Roosevelt
Republican
Elected President
Theodore Roosevelt
Republican

The 1904 United States presidential election in Massachusetts took place on November 8, 1904, as part of the 1904 United States presidential election. Voters chose 16 representatives, or electors to the Electoral College, who voted for president and vice president.

Massachusetts voted for the Republican nominee, President Theodore Roosevelt, over the Democratic nominee, former Chief Judge of New York Court of Appeals Alton B. Parker. Roosevelt won the state by a margin of 20.68%.

== Results ==
1904 United States presidential election in Massachusetts
Party	Candidate	Running mate	Popular vote		Electoral vote	
Party	Candidate	Running mate	Count	%	Count	%
Republican	Theodore Roosevelt of New York (incumbent)	Charles Warren Fairbanks of Indiana	257,822	57.92%	16	100.00%
Democratic	Alton Brooks Parker of New York	Henry Gassaway Davis of West Virginia	165,746	37.24%	0	0.00%
Socialist	Eugene Victor Debs of Indiana	Benjamin Hanford of New York	13,604	3.06%	0	0.00%
Prohibition	Silas Comfort Swallow of Pennsylvania	George Washington Carroll of Texas	4,279	0.96%	0	0.00%
Socialist Labor	Charles Hunter Corregan of New York	William Wesley Cox of Illinois	2,359	0.53%	0	0.00%
Populist	Thomas Edward Watson of Georgia	Thomas Tibbles of Nebraska	1,294	0.28%	0	0.00%
N/A	Others	Others	5	0.01%	0	0.00%
Total			445,109	100.00%	16	100.00%

=== Results by county ===
County	Theodore Roosevelt Republican		Alton B. Parker Democratic		Eugene Debs Socialist		Silas C. Swallow Prohibition		Charles Hunter Corregan Socialist Labor		Thomas E. Watson Populist		Others		Total votes cast
County	#	%	#	%	#	%	#	%	#	%	#	%	#	%	Total votes cast
Barnstable	3,638	77.72%	900	19.23%	35	0.75%	77	1.65%	16	0.34%	15	0.32%	0	0.00%	4,681
Berkshire	9,310	58.85%	5,800	36.66%	361	2.28%	156	0.99%	119	0.75%	75	0.47%	0	0.00%	15,821
Bristol	18,742	60.00%	11,103	35.55%	724	2.32%	344	1.10%	230	0.74%	92	0.29%	0	0.00%	31,235
Dukes	602	80.16%	120	15.98%	9	1.20%	13	1.73%	5	0.67%	2	0.27%	0	0.00%	751
Essex	36,980	62.26%	18,562	31.25%	2,366	3.98%	860	1.45%	409	0.69%	215	0.36%	0	0.00%	59,392
Franklin	5,034	71.40%	1,672	23.72%	217	3.08%	84	1.19%	13	0.18%	30	0.43%	0	0.00%	25,972
Hampden	14,962	57.61%	9,369	36.07%	1,115	4.29%	195	0.75%	180	0.69%	150	0.58%	1	0.00%	25,972
Hampshire	5,892	68.25%	2,292	26.55%	248	2.87%	140	1.62%	29	0.34%	32	0.37%	0	0.00%	8,633
Middlesex	55,704	60.63%	32,889	35.80%	1,665	1.81%	951	1.04%	424	0.46%	233	0.25%	2	0.00%	91,868
Nantucket	378	67.26%	170	30.25%	1	0.18%	7	1.25%	4	0.71%	2	0.36%	0	0.00%	562
Norfolk	16,104	62.15%	8,372	32.31%	1,036	4.00%	253	0.98%	93	0.36%	50	0.19%	2	0.01%	25,910
Plymouth	12,671	60.89%	5,746	27.61%	2,043	9.82%	194	0.93%	51	0.25%	104	0.50%	0	0.00%	20,809
Suffolk	43,681	44.14%	51,714	52.26%	2,387	2.41%	487	0.49%	507	0.51%	188	0.19%	0	0.00%	98,964
Worcester	34,124	63.83%	17,037	31.87%	1,397	2.61%	518	0.97%	279	0.52%	106	0.20%	0	0.00%	53,461
Totals	257,822	57.92%	165,746	37.24%	13,604	3.06%	4,279	0.96%	2,359	0.53%	1,294	0.29%	5	0.00%	445,109

== See also ==
- United States presidential elections in Massachusetts
