= 1868 United States presidential election in Massachusetts =

- November 3, 1868
- Turnout: 66.9 ▲3.1 pp
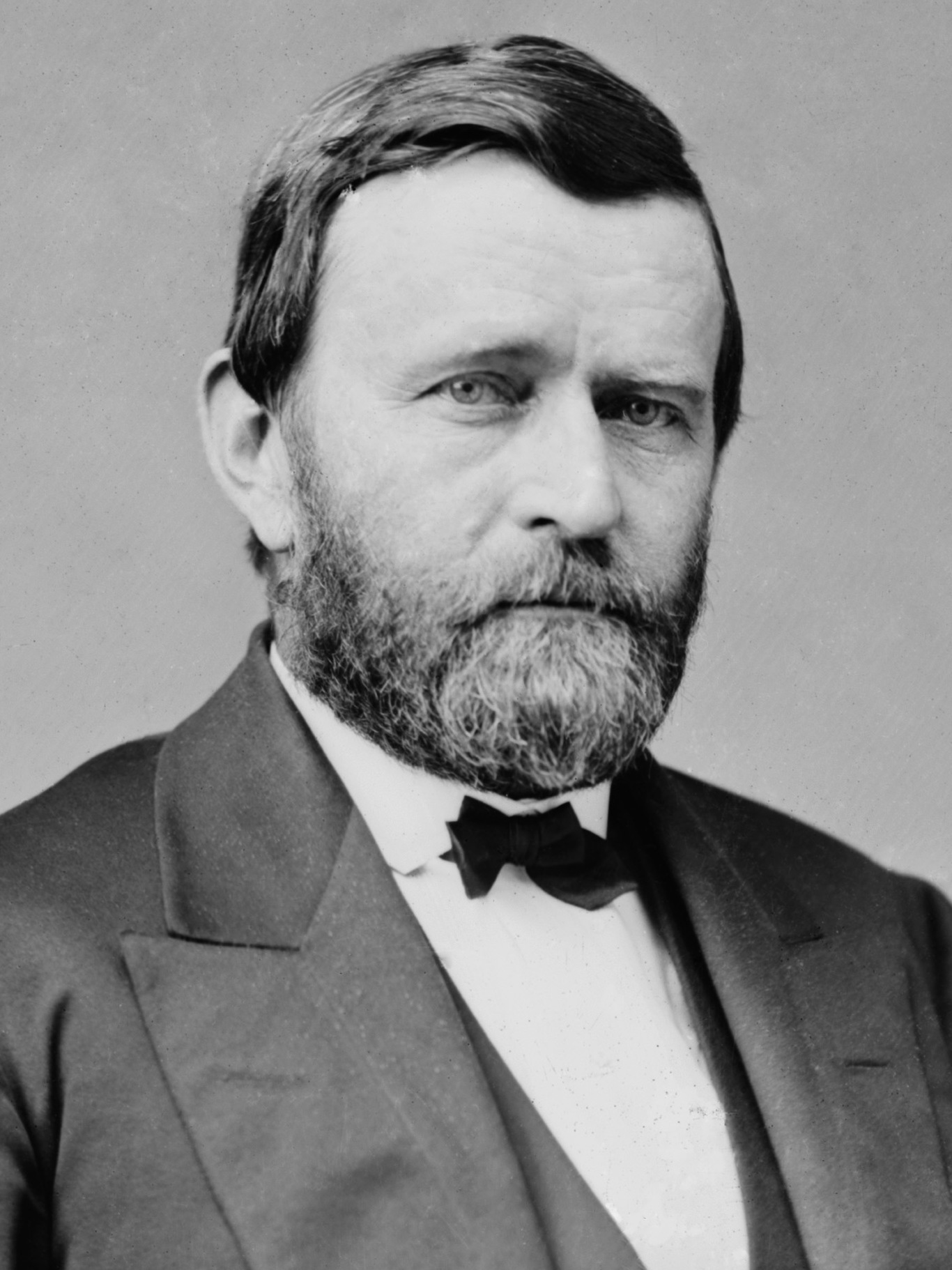

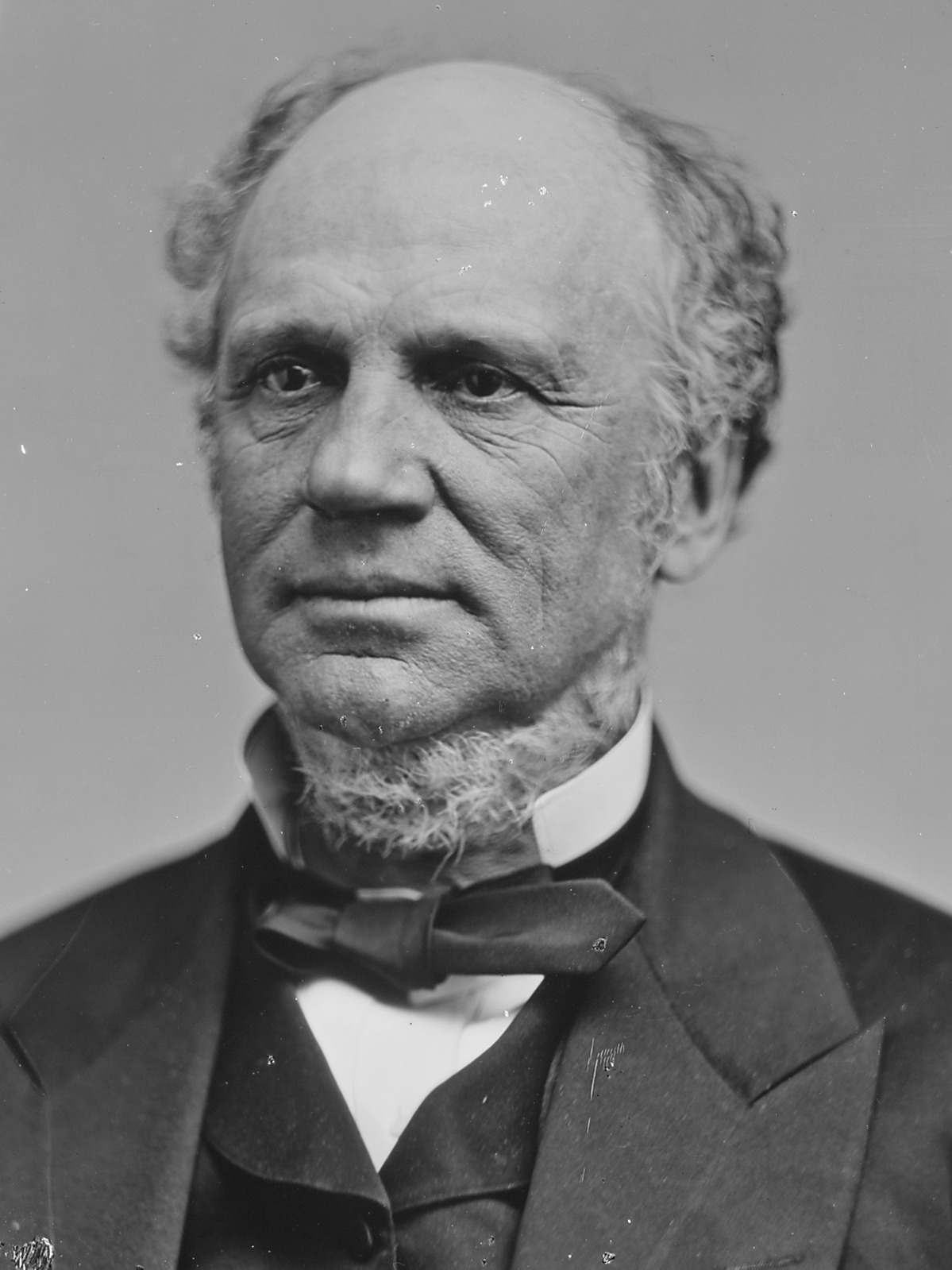
Nominee	Ulysses S. Grant	Horatio Seymour
Party	Republican	Democratic
Home state	Illinois	New York
Running mate	Schuyler Colfax	Francis Preston Blair Jr.
Electoral vote	12	0
Popular vote	136,379	59,103
Percentage	69.76%	30.23%

Grant
50–60%
60–70%
70–80%
80–90%
90–100%
Seymour
50–60%
70–80%
Tie
50%
No data/votes
President before election
Andrew Johnson
Democratic
Elected President
Ulysses S. Grant
Republican

The 1868 United States presidential election in Massachusetts took place on November 3, 1868, as part of the 1868 United States presidential election. Voters chose 12 representatives, or electors to the Electoral College, who voted for president and vice president.

Massachusetts voted for the Republican nominee, Ulysses S. Grant, over the Democratic nominee, Horatio Seymour. Grant won the state by a margin of 39.53%.

With 69.76% of the popular vote, Massachusetts would be Grant's second strongest victory in terms of popular vote percentage after neighboring Vermont.

This is the last election in which Dorchester voted in a presidential election, as it was annexed by the city of Boston in 1869.

== Results ==
1868 United States presidential election in Massachusetts
Party	Candidate	Running mate	Popular vote		Electoral vote	
Party	Candidate	Running mate	Count	%	Count	%
Republican	Ulysses S. Grant of Illinois	Schuyler Colfax of Indiana	136,379	69.76%	12	100.00%
Democratic	Horatio Seymour of New York	Francis Preston Blair Jr. of Missouri	59,103	30.23%	0	0.00%
N/A	Others	Others	26	0.01%	0	0.00%
Total			195,508	100.00%	12	100.00%

== See also ==
- United States presidential elections in Massachusetts
