= 1980 United States presidential election in Massachusetts =

- November 4, 1980
- Turnout: 81.31% (▼1.16%)

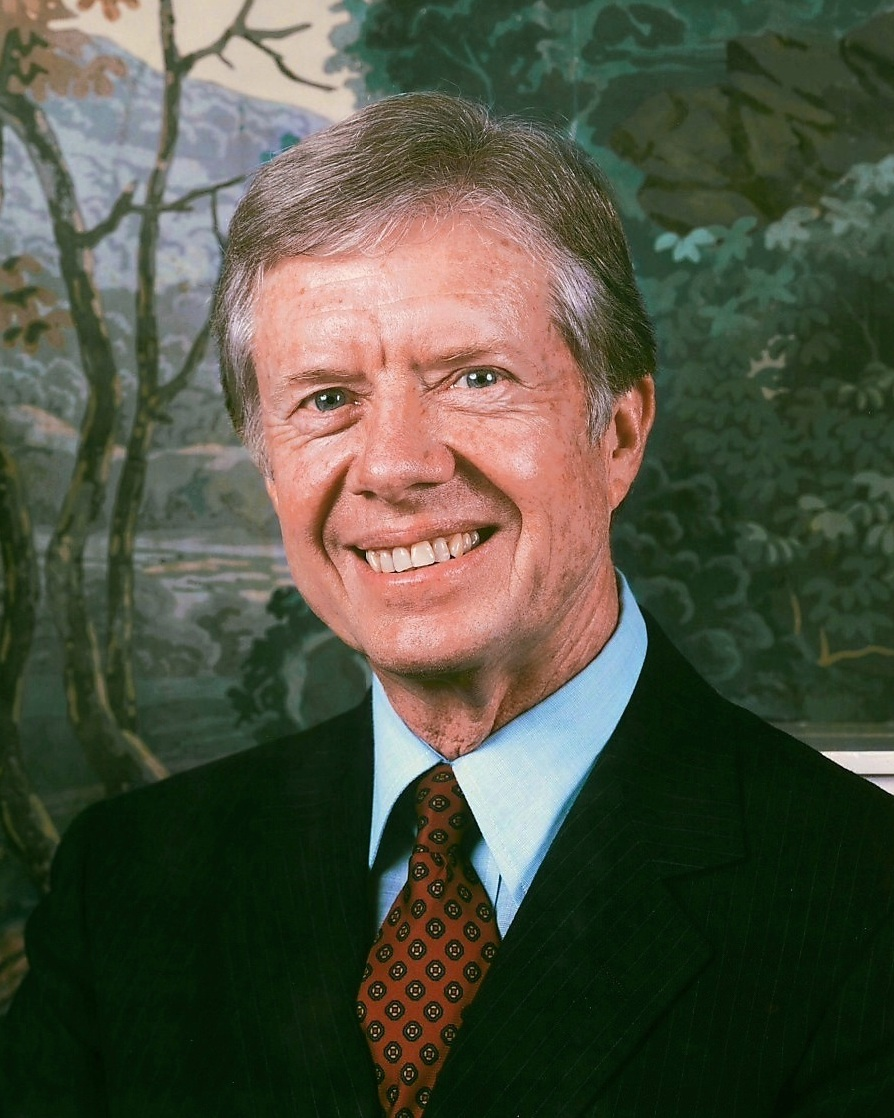

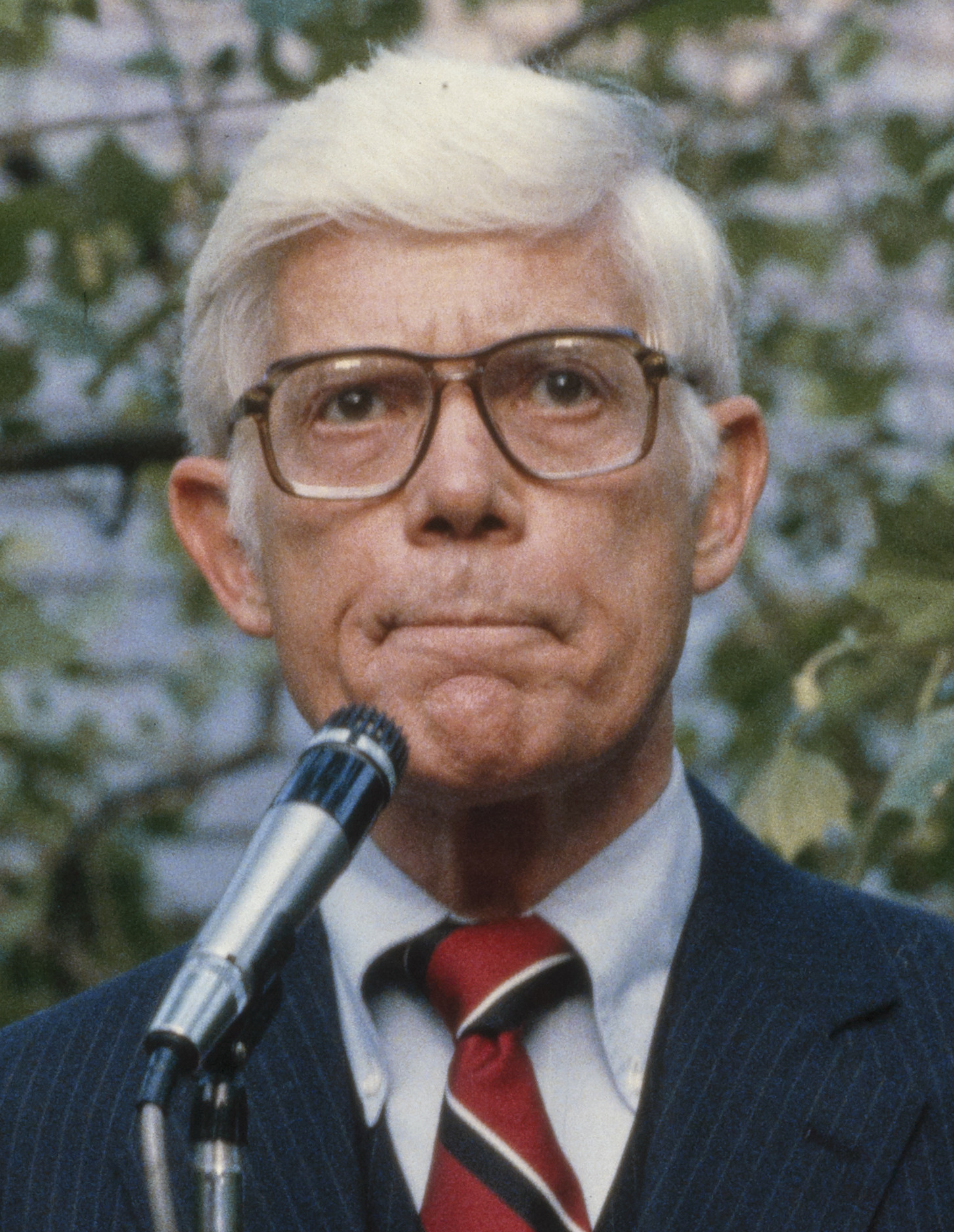
Nominee	Ronald Reagan	Jimmy Carter	John B. Anderson
Party	Republican	Democratic	Anderson Coalition
Home state	California	Georgia	Illinois
Running mate	George H. W. Bush	Walter Mondale	Patrick Lucey
Electoral vote	14	0	0
Popular vote	1,057,631	1,053,802	382,539
Percentage	41.90%	41.75%	15.15%

Reagan
30–40%
40–50%
50–60%
60–70%
Carter
30–40%
40–50%
50–60%
60–70%
President before election
Jimmy Carter
Democratic
Elected President
Ronald Reagan
Republican

The 1980 United States presidential election in Massachusetts took place on November 4, 1980, as part of the 1980 United States presidential election, which was held throughout all 50 states and D.C. Voters chose 14 representatives, or electors, to the Electoral College, who voted for president and vice president. By an exceptionally narrow margin, Massachusetts was carried by the Republican nominee, former governor Ronald Reagan of California, over incumbent Democratic President Jimmy Carter of Georgia. Also contesting the state was independent candidate Congressman John B. Anderson of Illinois, who won an unexpectedly solid 15.15%, mostly from disaffected Democratic voters.

On election day, Reagan won a plurality of 41.90% of the vote in the state to Carter's 41.75%, with Anderson in third at 15.15%, giving Reagan a razor-thin margin of 0.1517%. This constitutes the fifteenth-smallest percentage margin in any statewide presidential election since the Civil War, (twentieth overall) and the smallest since John F. Kennedy won Hawaii by 115 votes in that state's inaugural presidential election two decades previously. The only smaller percentage margins since have been Florida (537 votes or 0.009%) and New Mexico (361 votes or 0.061%) in the controversial 2000 election, and Missouri in 2008, which John McCain won by 3,903 votes or 0.1343%.

To date, this is the last time that the towns of Belmont, Fairhaven, Heath, Hull, Lexington, Lincoln, Swampscott, Truro, Warwick, and Wellfleet have voted Republican.

== Primaries ==
1980 Democratic primary
Candidate	Votes	Delegates
Ted Kennedy	590,393	81
Jimmy Carter (incumbent)	260,401	36
Jerry Brown	31,498	0
No preference	19,663	0
Blank votes	16,771	0
Others	5,368	0
Totals	907,314	117

1980 Republican primary
Candidate	Votes	Delegates
George H.W. Bush	124,365	16
John Anderson	122,987	16
Ronald Reagan	115,334	14
Howard Baker	19,366	0
John B. Connally	4,714	0
Philip M. Crane	4,669	0
Robert J. Dole	557	0
Benjamin Fernandez	374	0
Harold Stassen	218	0
No preference	2,243	0
Blank votes	5,807	0
Others	5,979	0
Totals	406,633	46

== Results ==
1980 United States presidential election in Massachusetts
Party	Candidate	Votes	Percentage	Electoral votes
Republican	Ronald Reagan	1,057,631	41.90%	14
Democratic	Jimmy Carter (incumbent)	1,053,802	41.75%	0
Anderson Coalition	John B. Anderson	382,539	15.15%	0
Libertarian	Ed Clark	22,038	0.87%	0
Socialist Workers	Clifton DeBerry	3,735	0.15%	0
Citizens (write-in)	Barry Commoner (write-in)	2,056	0.08%	0
write-ins	write-ins	2,497	0.09%	0
Totals		2,524,298	100.00%	14
Voter turnout (voting age/registered)				59%/80%

=== Results by county ===
County	Ronald Reagan Republican		Jimmy Carter Democratic		John B. Anderson Anderson Coalition		Ed Clark Libertarian		Various candidates Other parties		Margin		Total votes cast
County	#	%	#	%	#	%	#	%	#	%	#	%	Total votes cast
Barnstable	41,493	50.43%	23,952	29.11%	15,951	19.39%	567	0.69%	310	0.38%	17,541	21.32%	82,273
Berkshire	27,063	39.78%	29,458	43.30%	10,575	15.54%	740	1.09%	195	0.29%	-2,395	-3.52%	68,031
Bristol	77,545	41.12%	83,460	44.25%	25,423	13.48%	1,695	0.90%	482	0.26%	-5,915	-3.13%	188,605
Dukes	1,809	33.52%	2,370	43.91%	1,127	20.88%	58	1.07%	33	0.61%	-561	-10.39%	5,397
Essex	130,252	43.78%	116,173	39.05%	47,670	16.02%	2,654	0.89%	784	0.26%	14,079	4.73%	297,533
Franklin	12,528	41.59%	11,830	39.27%	5,162	17.14%	336	1.12%	266	0.88%	698	2.32%	30,122
Hampden	72,528	40.36%	80,369	44.72%	24,765	13.78%	1,676	0.93%	382	0.21%	-7,841	-4.36%	179,720
Hampshire	21,117	34.99%	27,611	45.75%	10,119	16.77%	656	1.09%	852	1.41%	-6,494	-10.76%	60,355
Middlesex	256,999	40.30%	270,751	42.46%	102,180	16.02%	5,200	0.82%	2,549	0.40%	-13,752	-2.16%	637,679
Nantucket	1,149	40.49%	1,040	36.65%	614	21.63%	22	0.78%	12	0.46%	109	3.84%	2,838
Norfolk	136,184	44.84%	117,274	38.61%	47,076	15.50%	2,448	0.81%	747	0.25%	18,910	6.23%	303,729
Plymouth	85,593	49.40%	58,772	33.92%	26,510	15.30%	1,952	1.13%	421	0.24%	26,821	15.48%	173,248
Suffolk	73,271	33.89%	113,416	52.46%	26,988	12.48%	1,861	0.86%	671	0.31%	-40,145	-18.57%	216,207
Worcester	120,100	43.11%	117,326	42.12%	38,379	13.78%	2,173	0.78%	583	0.21%	2,774	0.99%	278,561
Totals	1,057,631	41.90%	1,053,802	41.75%	382,539	15.15%	22,038	0.87%	8,288	0.33%	3,829	0.15%	2,524,298

==== Counties that flipped from Democratic to Republican ====
- Essex
- Franklin
- Norfolk
- Plymouth
- Worcester

== Analysis ==
With President Carter a greatly weakened incumbent by 1980, Reagan won a comfortable election victory nationwide. Massachusetts had been a Democratic-leaning state since 1928, and a Democratic stronghold since 1960. In 1972, Massachusetts was the only state in the nation to vote for Democrat George McGovern over Republican Richard Nixon in his 49-state landslide. However, in 1980 the Democratic Party in Massachusetts was divided and weakened after Carter had been unsuccessfully challenged by Massachusetts Senator Ted Kennedy (brother of the late President John F. Kennedy) in a bitter primary race which left many liberal voters in the state estranged from the incumbent, thus allowing Reagan to become the first Republican to win Massachusetts’ electoral votes since the landslide re-election of Dwight Eisenhower in 1956.

Another major contributing factor to Reagan's win in Massachusetts was the strong independent candidacy of John Anderson, a liberal Republican Congressman who ran in 1980 as an independent after failing to win the Republican Party's own presidential nomination. Anderson proved very popular with liberal and moderate voters in New England who normally leaned Democratic but were dissatisfied with the policies of the Carter administration and viewed Reagan as too far to the right. In 1976, Carter had won Massachusetts with 56% of the vote, however, in 1980 he bled a substantial amount of this support to Anderson, allowing Reagan to eke out a narrow win with only 41.90% of the vote. Nevertheless, Reagan became the first Republican ever to win the White House without carrying Dukes County, which cast only its third-ever Democratic vote in 1980, after 1964 and 1976. With 15.15% of the vote, Massachusetts would prove to be John B. Anderson's strongest state in the nation, and would more than double the 6.61% total he received nationwide.

While Reagan nationally won a convincing victory in the electoral college, Massachusetts would be his narrowest win, with the state being about ten percent more Democratic than the national average. As of 2024, this election marks only the third and last time (after 1852 and 1972) that Massachusetts has not voted for the same candidate as neighboring Rhode Island.

== See also ==
- Presidency of Ronald Reagan
- United States presidential elections in Massachusetts
