= 1844 United States presidential election in Massachusetts =

- November 11, 1844
- Turnout: 65.8% ▼0.9 pp
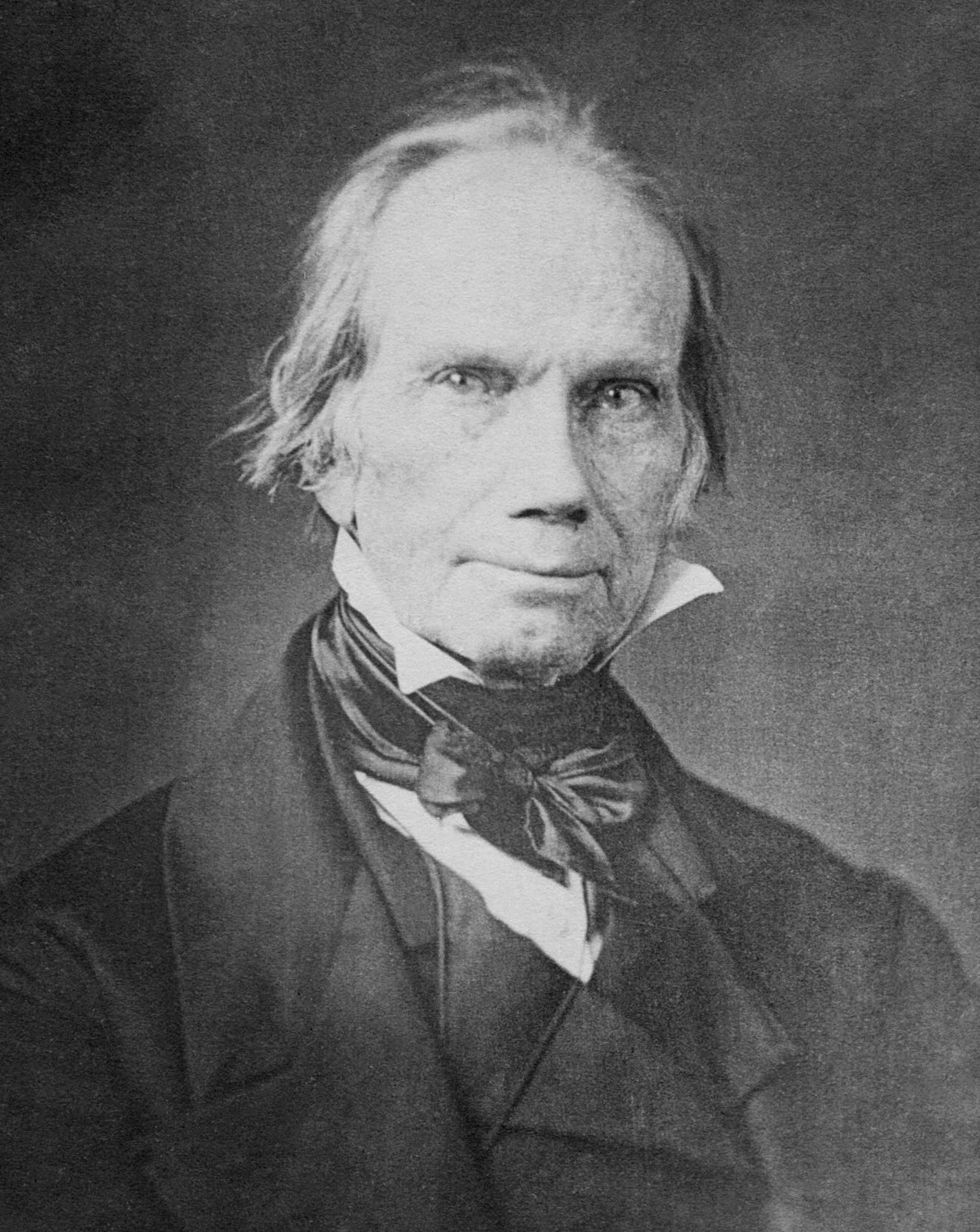

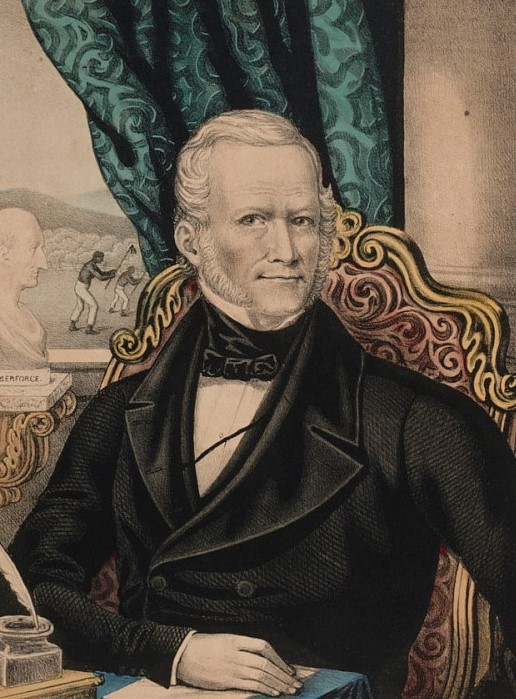
Nominee	Henry Clay	James K. Polk	James G. Birney
Party	Whig	Democratic	Liberty
Home state	Kentucky	Tennessee	Michigan
Running mate	Theodore Frelinghuysen	George M. Dallas	Thomas Morris
Electoral vote	12	0	0
Popular vote	67,062	53,039	10,830
Percentage	50.79%	40.17%	8.20%
County results
Clay
40–50%
50–60%
60–70%
Polk
40–50%
President before election
John Tyler
Independent
Elected President
James K. Polk
Democratic

A presidential election was held in Massachusetts on November 11, 1844 as part of the 1844 United States presidential election. Voters chose 12 representatives, or electors to the Electoral College, who voted for president and vice president.

Massachusetts voted for the Whig candidate, Henry Clay, over Democratic candidate James K. Polk and Liberty candidate James G. Birney. Clay won Massachusetts by a margin of 10.62%.

With 8.20% of the popular vote, Massachusetts would prove to be James G. Birney's second strongest state after neighboring New Hampshire.

== Results ==
1844 United States presidential election in Massachusetts
Party	Candidate	Running mate	Popular vote		Electoral vote	
Party	Candidate	Running mate	Count	%	Count	%
Whig	Henry Clay of Kentucky	Theodore Frelinghuysen of New York	67,062	50.79%	12	100.00%
Democratic	James K. Polk of Tennessee	George M. Dallas of Pennsylvania	53,039	40.17%	0	0.00%
Liberty	James G. Birney of Michigan	Thomas Morris of Ohio	10,830	8.20%	0	0.00%
N/A	Others	Others	1,106	0.84%	0	0.00%
Total			132,037	100.00%	12	100.00%

== See also ==
- United States presidential elections in Massachusetts
