= 1864 United States presidential election in Massachusetts =

- November 8, 1864
- Turnout: 63.8% ▼2.0 pp

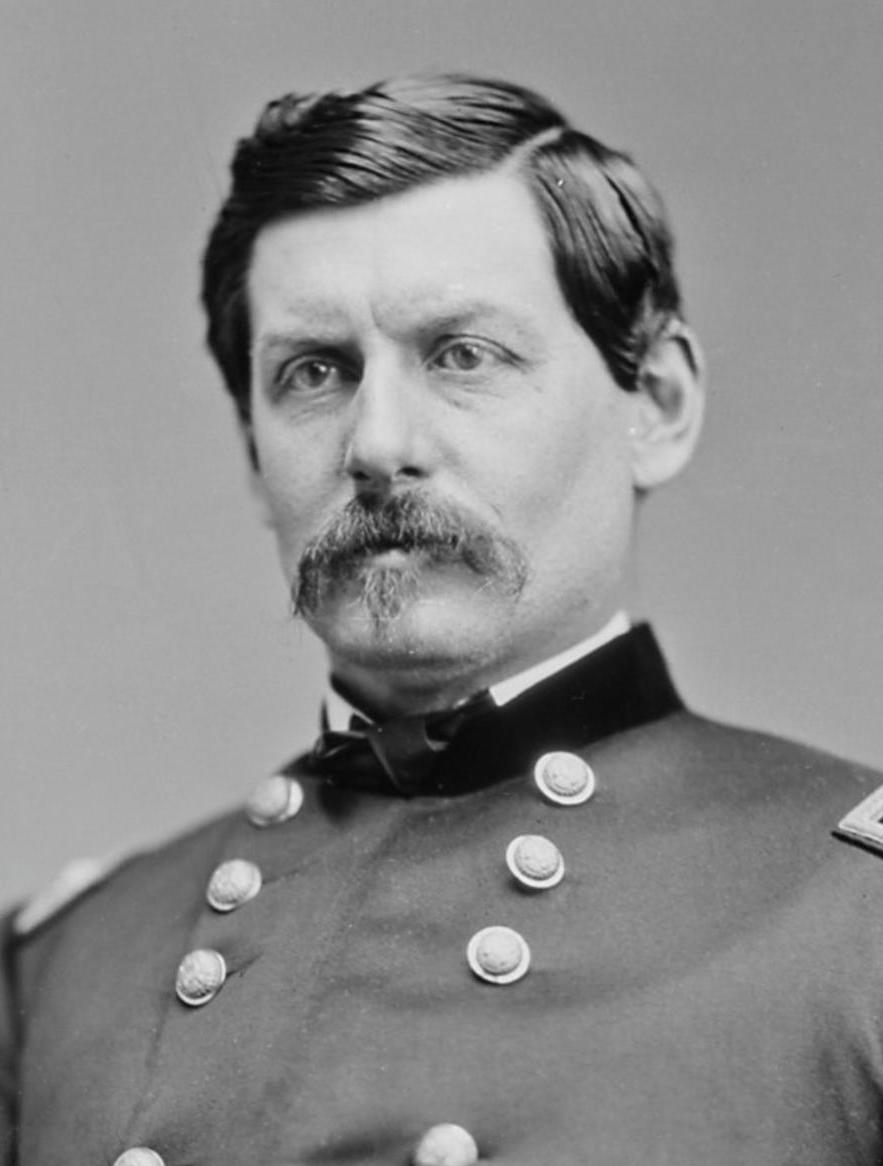
Nominee	Abraham Lincoln	George B. McClellan
Party	National Union	Democratic
Home state	Illinois	New Jersey
Running mate	Andrew Johnson	George H. Pendleton
Electoral vote	12	0
Popular vote	126,742	48,745
Percentage	72.22%	27.77%
County results
Lincoln
60–70%
70–80%
80–90%
90–100%
President before election
Abraham Lincoln
Republican
Elected President
Abraham Lincoln
National Union

The 1864 United States presidential election in Massachusetts took place on November 8, 1864, as part of the 1864 United States presidential election. Voters chose 12 representatives, or electors to the Electoral College, who voted for president and vice president.

Massachusetts voted for the National Union candidate, incumbent Republican president Abraham Lincoln and his running mate Andrew Johnson. They defeated the Democratic candidate, George B. McClellan and his running mate George H. Pendleton. Lincoln won the state by a margin of 44.44%.

Although Lincoln ran under the National Union banner, this is the best Republican performance in Massachusetts as of the 2024 election. With 72.22% of the popular vote, Lincoln's performance in Massachusetts made it his third best performance in the 1864 election after Kansas and neighboring Vermont.

This is the last election in which the city of Roxbury voted in a presidential election, as it was annexed by the city of Boston in 1868.

== Results ==
1864 United States presidential election in Massachusetts
Party	Candidate	Votes	Percentage	Electoral votes
National Union	Abraham Lincoln (incumbent)	126,742	72.22%	12
Democratic	George B. McClellan	48,745	27.77%	0
N/A	Write-ins	3	0.01%	0
Totals		175,490	100.0%	12

== See also ==
- United States presidential elections in Massachusetts
