= 1840 United States presidential election in Massachusetts =

- November 9, 1840
- Turnout: 66.7% ▲23.3 pp
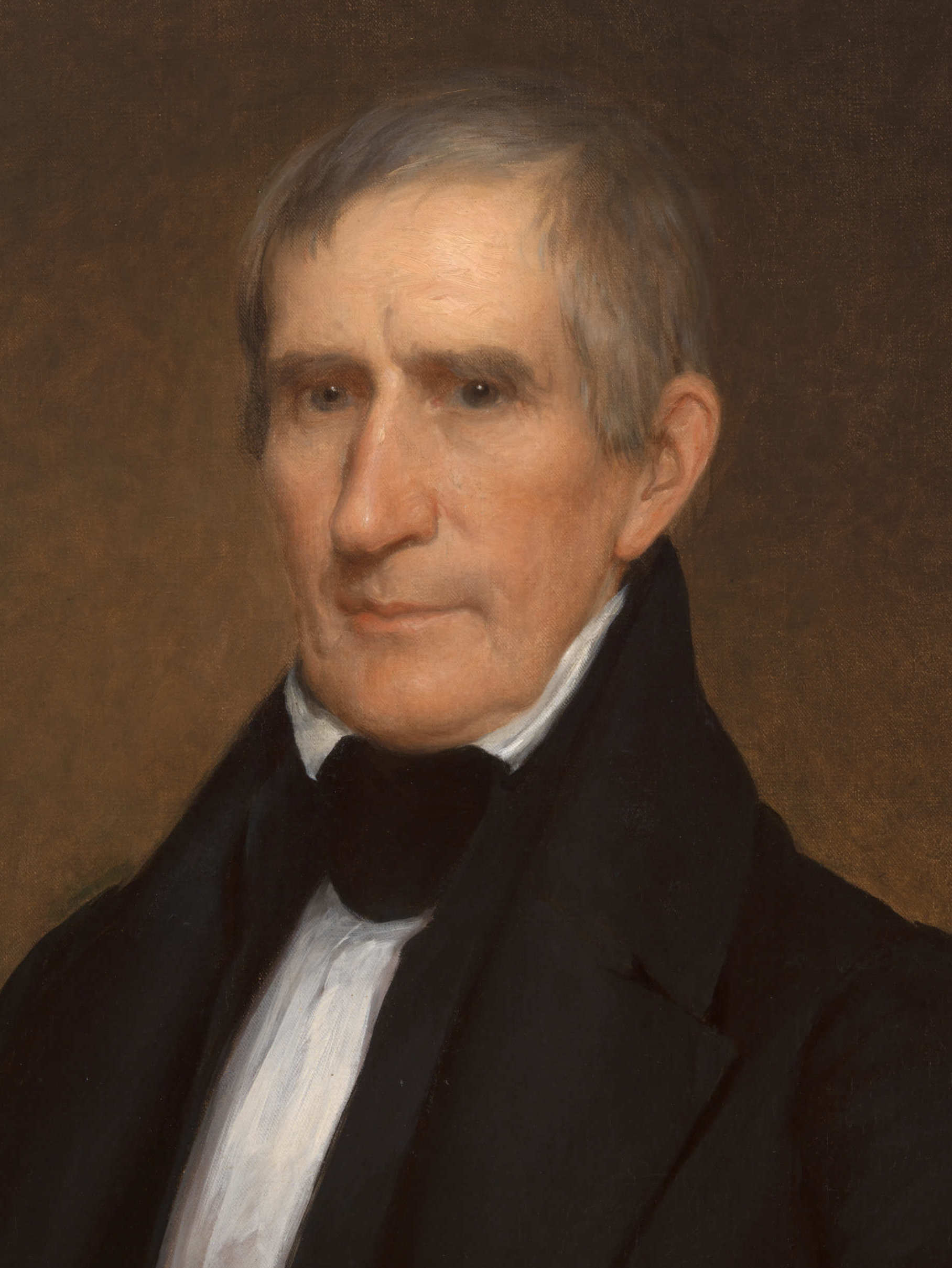

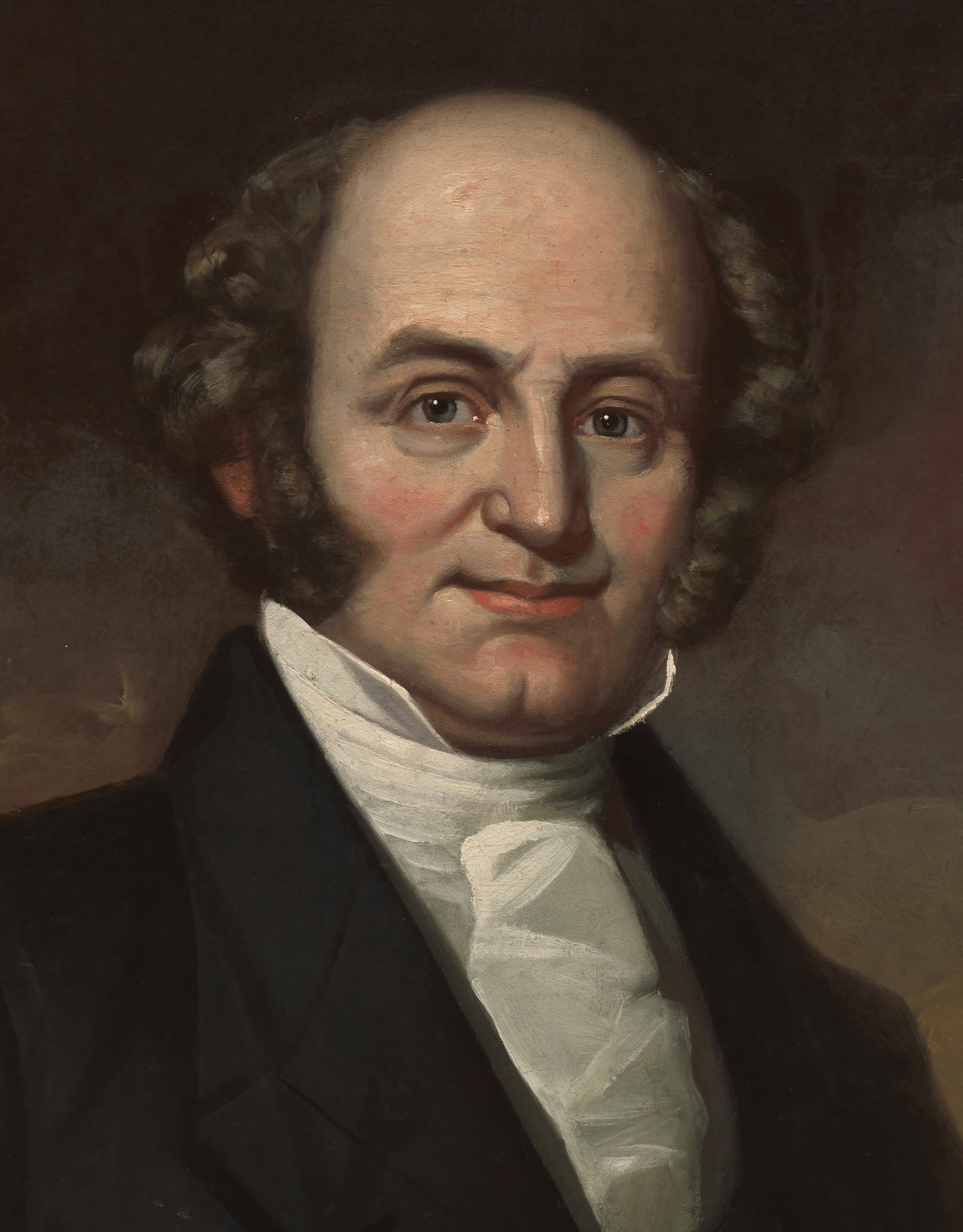
Nominee	William Henry Harrison	Martin Van Buren
Party	Whig	Democratic
Home state	Ohio	New York
Running mate	John Tyler	none
Electoral vote	14	0
Popular vote	72,852	52,355
Percentage	57.44%	41.28%
County results
Harrison
40–50%
50–60%
60–70%
Van Buren
40–50%
President before election
Martin Van Buren
Democratic
Elected President
William Henry Harrison
Whig

A presidential election was held in Massachusetts on November 9, 1840 as part of the 1840 United States presidential election. Voters chose 14 representatives, or electors to the Electoral College, who voted for president and vice president.

Massachusetts voted for the Whig candidate, William Henry Harrison, over Democratic candidate Martin Van Buren. Harrison won Massachusetts by a margin of 16.16%.

== Results ==
1840 United States presidential election in Massachusetts
Party	Candidate	Running mate	Popular vote		Electoral vote	
Party	Candidate	Running mate	Count	%	Count	%
Whig	William Henry Harrison of Ohio	John Tyler of Virginia	72,852	57.44%	14	100.00%
Democratic	Martin Van Buren of New York	Richard Mentor Johnson of Kentucky	52,355	41.28%	0	0.00%
Liberty	James G. Birney of New York	Thomas Earle of Pennsylvania	1,618	1.28%	0	0.00%
Total			126,825	100.00%	14	100.00%

== See also ==
- United States presidential elections in Massachusetts
