= 1832 United States presidential election in Massachusetts =

- November 2 – December 5, 1832
- Turnout: 39.4% ▲13.7 pp
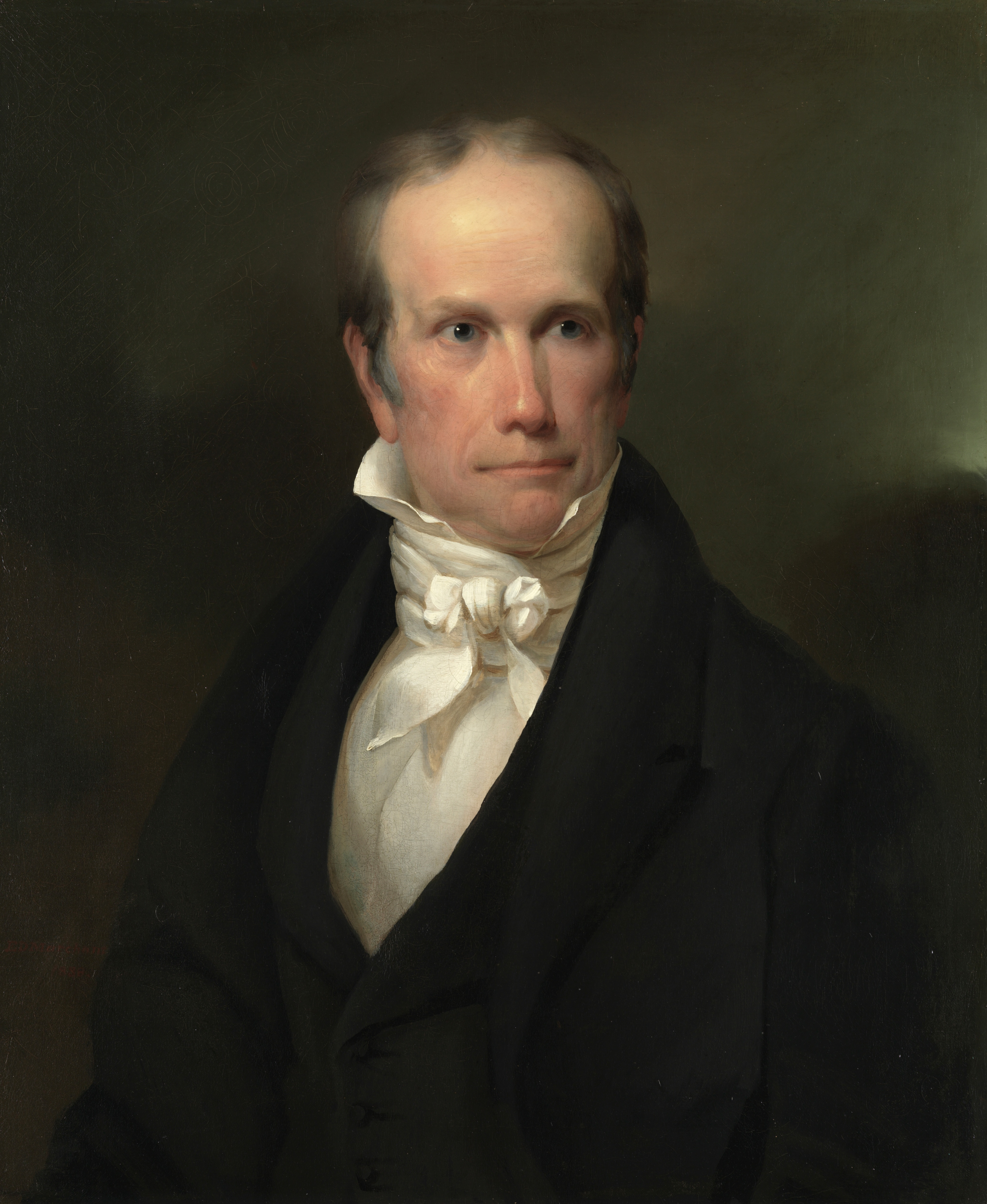

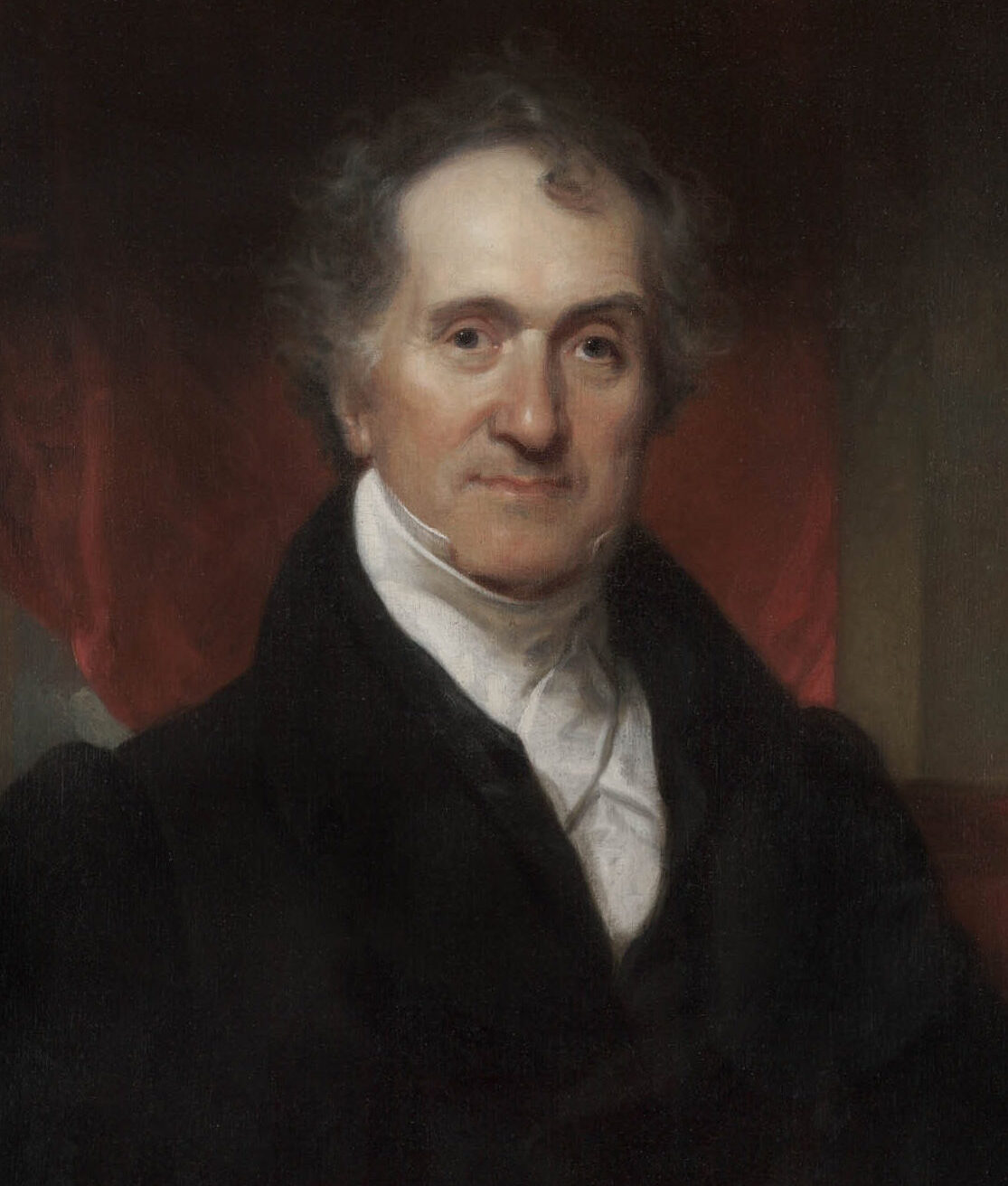

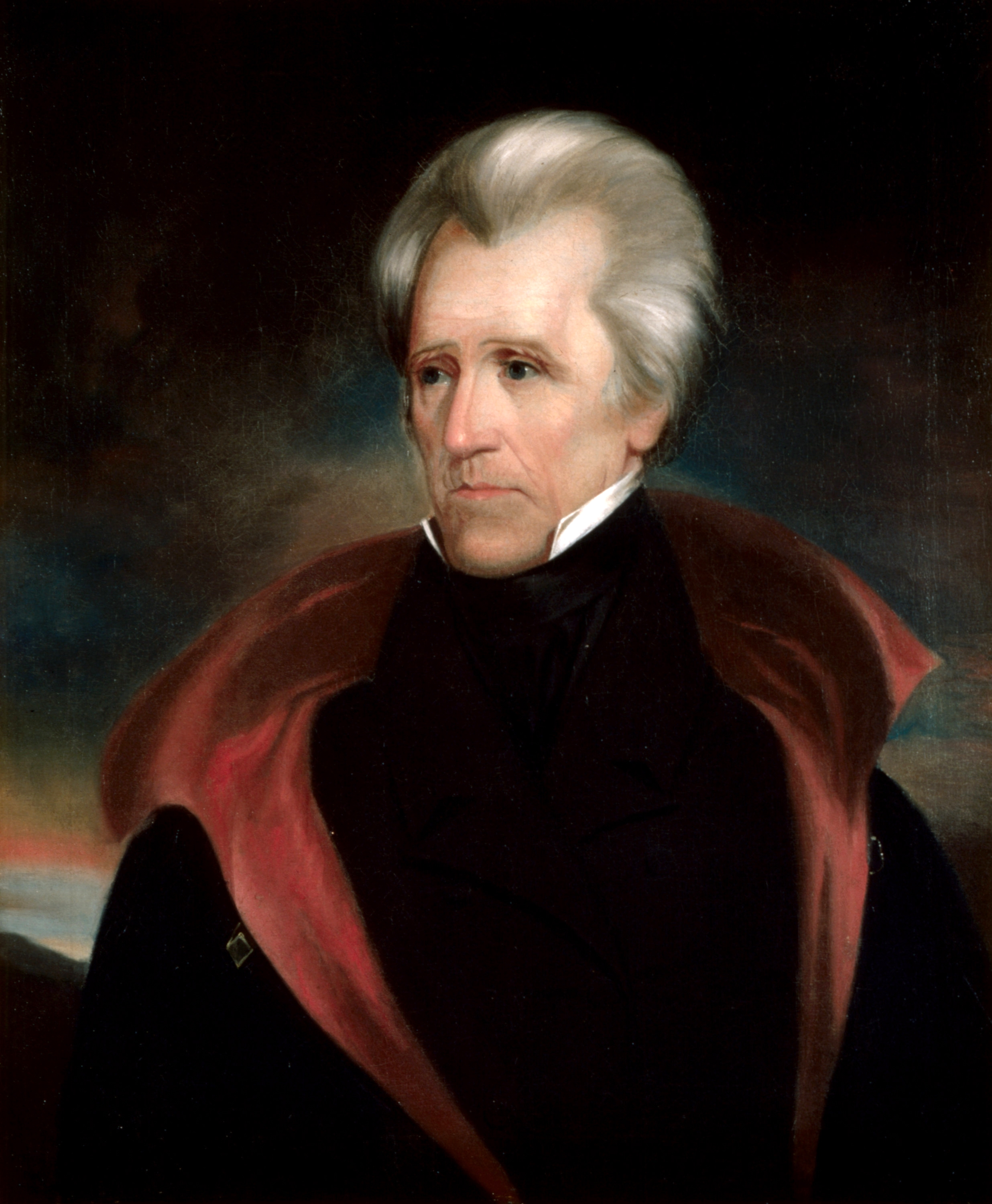
| Nominee | Henry Clay | William Wirt | Andrew Jackson |
| Party | National Republican | Anti-Masonic | Democratic |
| Home state | Kentucky | Maryland | Tennessee |
| Running mate | John Sergeant | Amos Ellmaker | Martin Van Buren |
| Electoral vote | 14 | 0 | 0 |
| Popular vote | 31,963 | 14,692 | 13,933 |
| Percentage | 47.27% | 21.73% | 20.61% |
County results
Clay
40–50%
50–60%
70–80%
80–90%
Wirt
40–50%
50–60%

The 1832 United States presidential election in Massachusetts took place between November 2 and December 5, 1832, as part of the 1832 United States presidential election. Voters chose 14 representatives, or electors to the Electoral College, who voted for president and vice president.

Massachusetts voted for the National Republican candidate, Henry Clay, over the Anti-Masonic Party candidate, William Wirt, and the Democratic Party candidate, Andrew Jackson. Clay won Massachusetts by a wide margin of 25.54%.

Jackson remains the only Democrat to win two consecutive terms without ever carrying Massachusetts.

== Results ==
1832 United States presidential election in Massachusetts
| Party | Candidate | Votes | Percentage | Electoral votes |
|---|---|---|---|---|
| National Republican | Henry Clay | 31,963 | 47.27% | 14 |
| Anti-Masonic | William Wirt | 14,692 | 21.73% | 0 |
| Democratic | Andrew Jackson (incumbent) | 13,933 | 20.61% | 0 |
| N/A | Other | 7,031 | 10.40% | 0 |
| Totals | | 67,619 | 100.0% | 14 |

== See also ==
- United States presidential elections in Massachusetts
