= 1860 United States presidential election in Massachusetts =

- November 2, 1860
- Turnout: 65.8% ▼4.0 pp
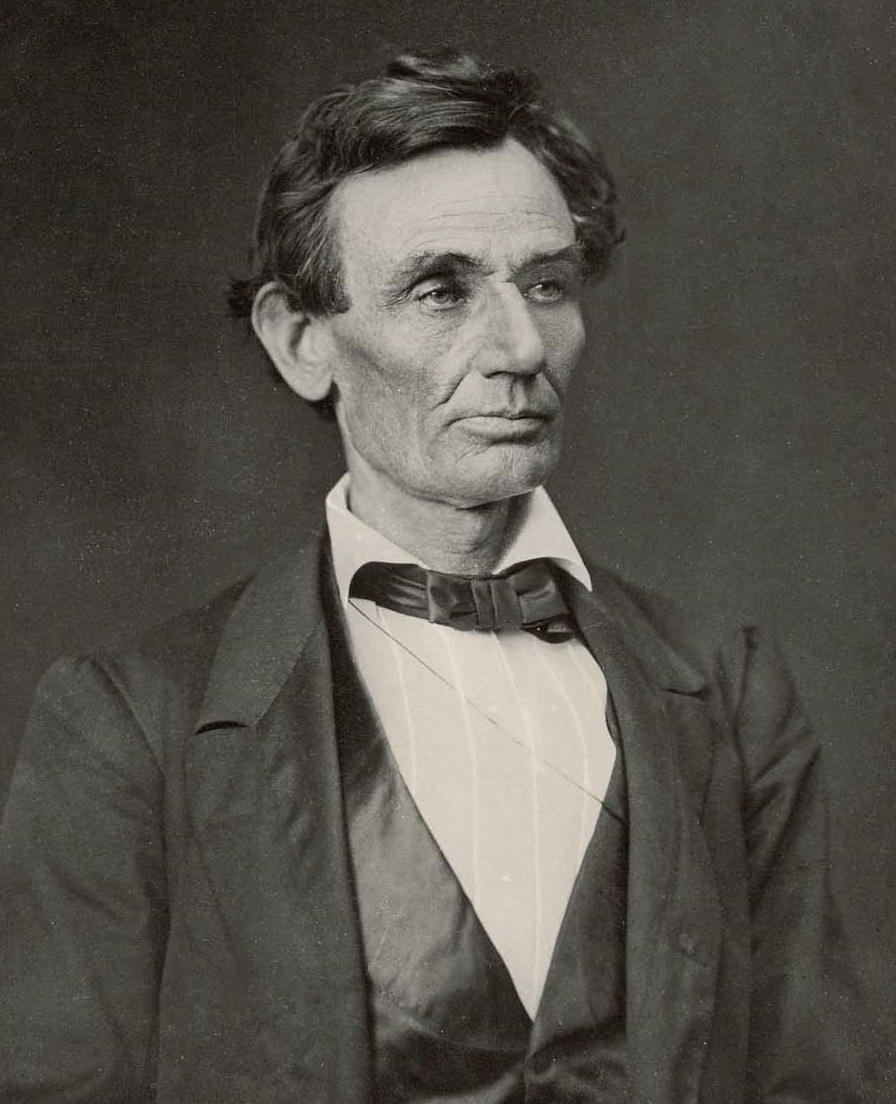

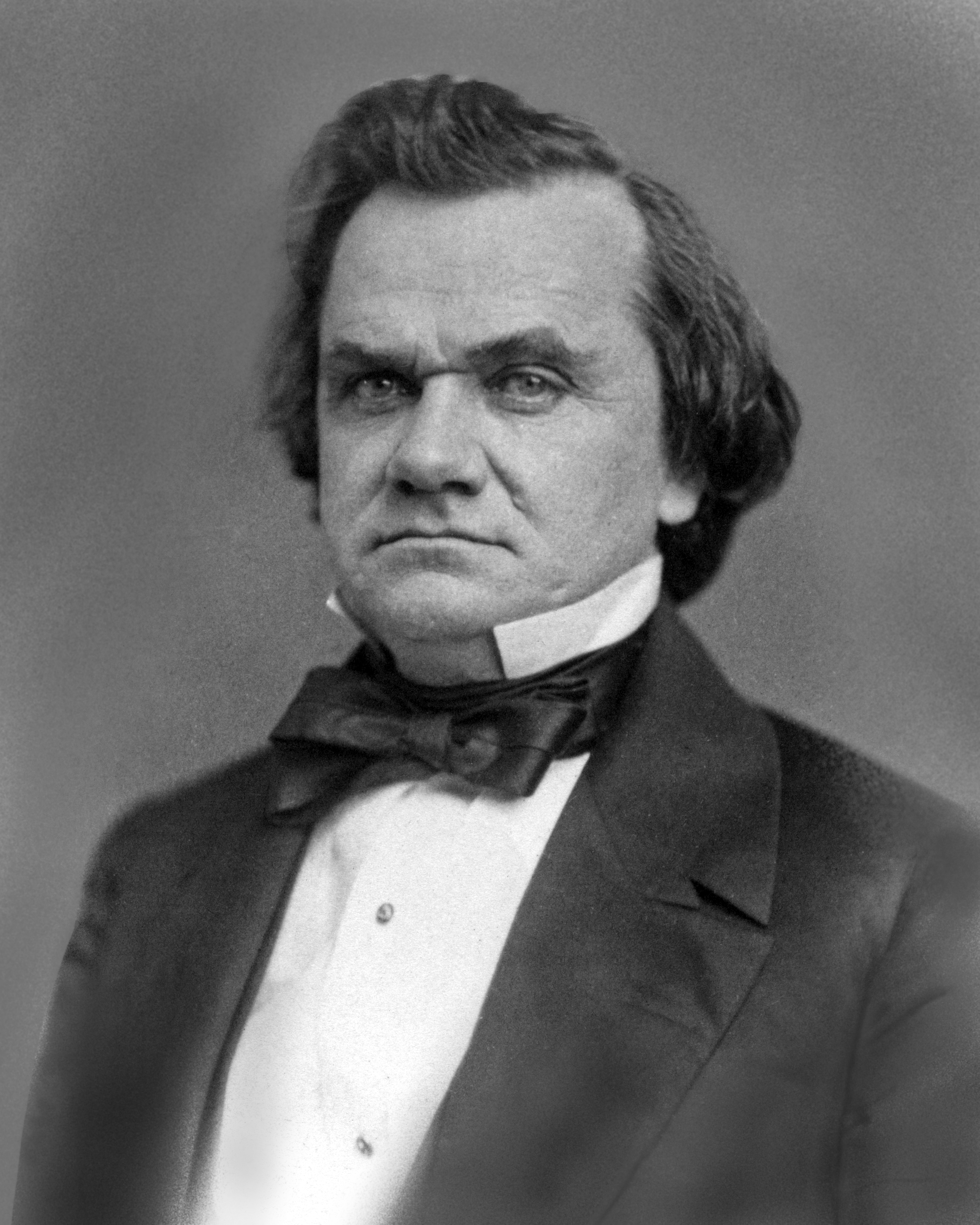

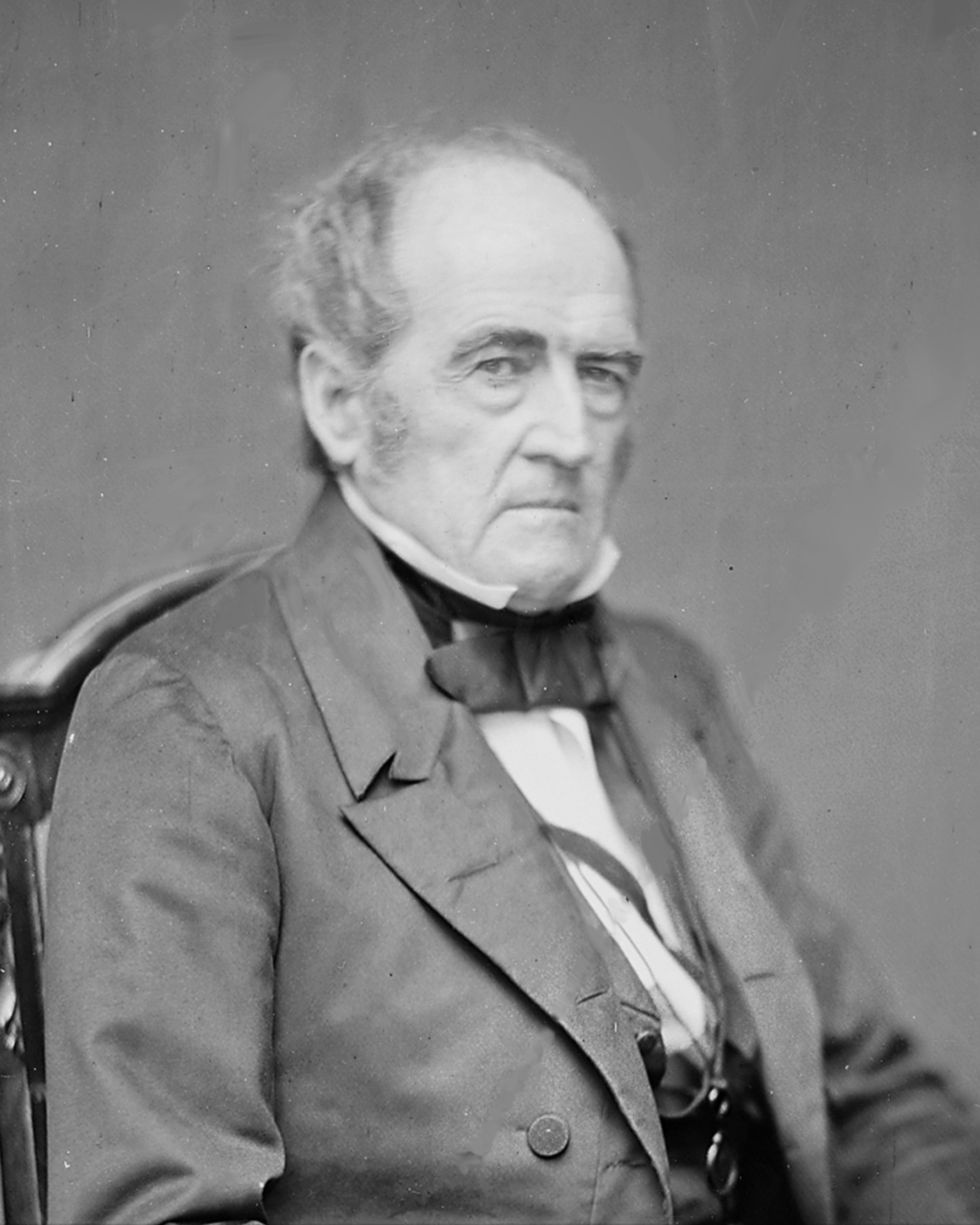
Nominee	Abraham Lincoln	Stephen A. Douglas	John Bell
Party	Republican	Democratic	Constitutional Union
Home state	Illinois	Illinois	Tennessee
Running mate	Hannibal Hamlin	Herschel V. Johnson	Edward Everett
Electoral vote	13	0	0
Popular vote	106,684	34,370	22,331
Percentage	62.80%	20.23%	13.15%
County results
Lincoln
40–50%
50–60%
60–70%
70–80%
80–90%
President before election
James Buchanan
Democratic
Elected President
Abraham Lincoln
Republican

The 1860 United States presidential election in Massachusetts took place on November 2, 1860, as part of the 1860 United States presidential election. Voters chose 13 electors of the Electoral College, who voted for president and vice president.

Massachusetts was won by Republican candidate Abraham Lincoln, who won the state by 42.57%.

With 62.80% of the popular vote, Massachusetts would prove to be Lincoln's third strongest state in the 1860 election in terms of popular vote percentage after neighboring Vermont and Minnesota.

== Results ==
1860 United States presidential election in Massachusetts
Party	Candidate	Running mate	Popular vote		Electoral vote	
Party	Candidate	Running mate	Count	%	Count	%
Republican	Abraham Lincoln of Illinois	Hannibal Hamlin of Maine	106,684	62.80%	13	100.00%
Democratic	Stephen Arnold Douglas of Illinois	Herschel Vespasian Johnson of Georgia	34,370	20.23%	0	0.00%
Constitutional Union	John Bell of Tennessee	Edward Everett of Massachusetts	22,331	13.15%	0	0.00%
Southern Democratic	John Cabell Breckinridge of Kentucky	Joseph Lane of Oregon	6,163	3.63%	0	0.00%
N/A	Others	Others	328	0.19%	0	0.00%
Total			169,876	100.00%	13	100.00%

=== Results by County ===
1860 United States Presidential Election in Massachusetts (By County)
County	Abraham Lincoln Republican		Stephen A. Douglas Democratic		John Bell Constitutional Union		John C. Breckinridge Southern Democratic		Total votes cast
County	#	%	#	%	#	%	#	%	Total votes cast
Barnstable	2,371	75.20%	133	4.22%	283	8.98%	366	11.61%	3,153
Berkshire	5,202	61.17%	2,865	33.69%	238	2.80%	199	2.34%	8,504
Bristol	7,980	74.90%	1,713	16.08%	640	6.01%	321	3.01%	10,654
Dukes	338	58.68%	116	20.14%	58	10.07%	64	11.11%	576
Essex	14,832	65.55%	3,778	16.70%	3,187	14.09%	829	3.66%	22,626
Franklin	3,994	74.28%	917	17.05%	135	2.51%	331	6.16%	5,377
Hampden	5,184	64.28%	1,993	24.71%	296	3.67%	592	7.34%	8,065
Hampshire	4,597	81.84%	608	10.82%	182	3.24%	230	4.09%	5,617
Middlesex	17,806	58.10%	7,069	23.07%	4,850	15.83%	921	3.01%	30,646
Nantucket	420	78.36%	31	5.78%	76	14.18%	9	1.68%	536
Norfolk	8,860	55.81%	3,589	22.61%	2,987	18.82%	438	2.76%	15,874
Plymouth	6,703	65.13%	1,426	13.86%	1,869	18.16%	293	2.85%	10,291
Suffolk	10,974	48.84%	4,891	21.77%	5,640	25.10%	964	4.29%	22,469
Worcester	17,272	69.68%	5,243	21.15%	1,890	7.62%	382	1.54%	24,787
Total	106,684	62.80%	34,370	20.23%	22,331	13.15%	6,163	3.63%	169,876

== See also ==
- United States presidential elections in Massachusetts
