= 1836 United States presidential election in Massachusetts =

- November 14, 1836
- Turnout: 43.4% ▲4.0 pp
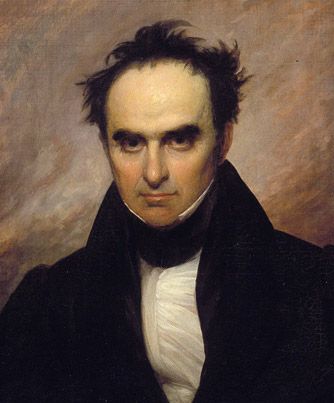

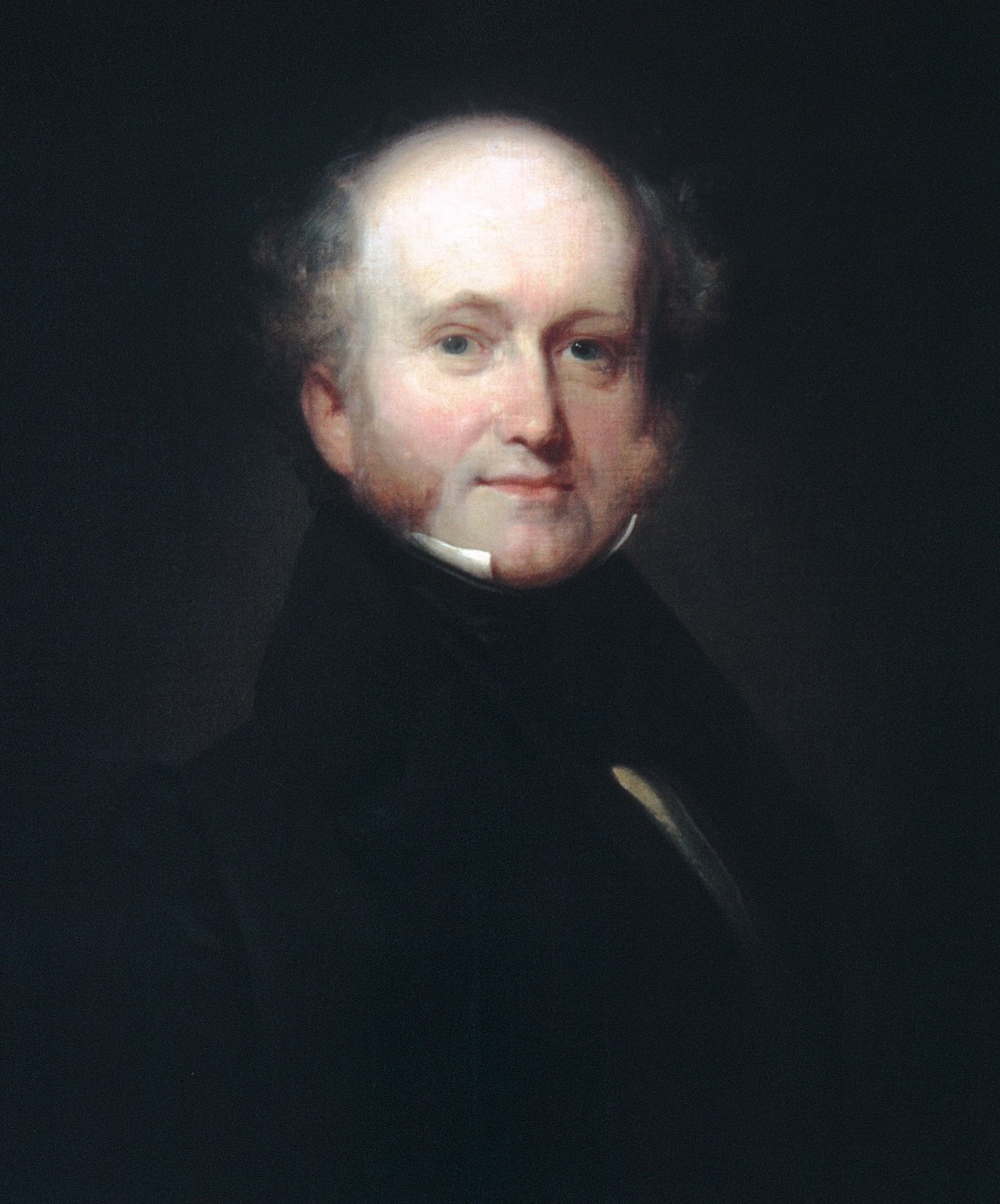
Nominee	Daniel Webster	Martin Van Buren
Party	Whig	Democratic
Home state	Massachusetts	New York
Running mate	Francis Granger	Richard Mentor Johnson
Electoral vote	14	0
Popular vote	41,201	33,486
Percentage	55.13%	44.81%
County results
Webster
50–60%
60–70%
70–80%
Van Buren
50–60%

A presidential election was held in Massachusetts on November 14, 1836 as part of the 1836 United States presidential election. Voters chose 14 representatives, or electors to the Electoral College, who voted for president and vice president.

Massachusetts voted for Whig candidate and state native Daniel Webster over the Democratic candidate, Martin Van Buren. Webster won Massachusetts by a margin of 10.32%.

In a unique strategy to throw the election into the House of Representatives, the Whigs ran four different candidates in different sections of the United States. This is the only state in which Daniel Webster was on the ballot.

== Results ==
1836 United States presidential election in Massachusetts
Party	Candidate	Votes	Percentage	Electoral votes
Whig	Daniel Webster	41,201	55.13%	14
Democratic	Martin Van Buren	33,486	44.81%	0
N/A	Other	45	0.06%	0
Totals		74,732	100.00%	14

== See also ==
- United States presidential elections in Massachusetts
