= 1960 United States presidential election in Massachusetts =

- November 8, 1960
- Turnout: 91.73% (▲2.33%)

Nominee	John F. Kennedy	Richard Nixon
Party	Democratic	Republican
Home state	Massachusetts	California
Running mate	Lyndon B. Johnson	Henry Cabot Lodge Jr.
Electoral vote	16	0
Popular vote	1,487,174	976,750
Percentage	60.22%	39.55%

Kennedy
50–60%
60–70%
70–80%
80–90%
Nixon
50–60%
60–70%
70–80%
80–90%
President before election
Dwight D. Eisenhower
Republican
Elected President
John F. Kennedy
Democratic

The 1960 United States presidential election in Massachusetts took place on November 8, 1960, as part of the 1960 United States presidential election, which was held throughout all 50 states. Voters chose 16 representatives, or electors, to the Electoral College, who voted for president and vice president.

Massachusetts voted overwhelmingly for the Democratic nominee, John F. Kennedy, who was serving as the state's junior U.S. senator, over the Republican nominee, Vice President Richard Nixon of California. Kennedy ran with Senate Majority Leader Lyndon B. Johnson of Texas, while Nixon's running mate was former ambassador Henry Cabot Lodge Jr. of Massachusetts.

Kennedy carried his home state of Massachusetts in a landslide, taking 60.22% of the vote to Nixon's 39.55%, a Democratic victory margin of 20.67%. This made it the third most Democratic state in the nation, after Rhode Island and Georgia.

As Kennedy narrowly defeated Nixon nationally to win the presidency, Massachusetts weighed in for this election as about 21% more Democratic than the national average. Massachusetts had been a Democratic-leaning state since 1928, when the Democratic Party had nominated the first Roman Catholic nominee for president, Al Smith. While Smith lost nationally in a landslide, partially due to anti-Catholic prejudice in much of the country, he won Massachusetts due to the massive turnout and support of the many Irish Catholics in the state. In 1960, John F. Kennedy became the second Roman Catholic presidential nominee by a major party, and again his religion became an issue in some regions of the country. However, there was little doubt that Kennedy, an Irish Catholic born in Brookline, Massachusetts, would be able to carry Massachusetts in his presidential run.

Since 1928, Massachusetts had been a swing state, having voted for Democrats Franklin D. Roosevelt and Harry S. Truman in the 1930s and 1940s, but voting for Republican Dwight D. Eisenhower in both 1952 and 1956. In 1956, Eisenhower had carried the state by 19 points. The 21-point margin by which Kennedy won Massachusetts 4 years later thus represented a massive 40-point swing toward the Democrats between the 1956 and 1960 elections. Kennedy's landslide victory in 1960 finally solidified the transformation of Massachusetts into a Democratic stronghold in the modern era. For the first time in American presidential history, in 1960, a Democrat broke 60% of the vote in Massachusetts, and thus Kennedy's 60.22%.

Religion was a major dividing factor in shaping the vote in 1960. Nixon's running mate, Henry Cabot Lodge, was also from Massachusetts, and had served the state as a Republican senator, but was a Protestant, and represented traditional Protestant Yankee Republicanism in Massachusetts. Kennedy, an Irish Catholic Democrat, represented an entirely different strain of Massachusetts politics, the emerging majority coalition of urban and ethnic immigrant voters. In 1952, Kennedy had first defeated Lodge to take the latter's U.S. Senate seat, symbolizing this new Democratic coalition's rise in the state. The residual Yankee Republicanism combined with the popularity of the Republican incumbent Eisenhower allowed Nixon to take a decent 39.55% of the vote, but by 1960, the ethnic Catholic vote held a decisive majority in Massachusetts, and turnout among Catholic voters reached record highs in 1960.

Kennedy carried 9 of the state's 14 counties, including the most heavily populated parts of the state surrounding the large cities of Boston, Worcester, and Springfield. Nixon carried only five counties, three of them island or peninsula counties. Nixon's most significant win was Plymouth County, which he won narrowly with 51% of the vote.

To date, this is the last time that the city of Amherst and the towns of Aquinnah, Belchertown, Stockbridge, and Wendell voted Republican.

== Results ==
1960 United States presidential election in Massachusetts
Party	Candidate	Votes	Percentage	Electoral votes
Democratic	John F. Kennedy	1,487,174	60.22%	16
Republican	Richard Nixon	976,750	39.55%	0
Socialist Labor	Eric Hass	3,892	0.16%	0
Prohibition	Rutherford Decker	1,633	0.07%	0
Write-ins	Write-ins	31	0.00%	0
Totals		2,469,480	100.00%	16
Voter turnout (voting age/registered)				76%/91%

=== Results by county ===
County	John F. Kennedy Democratic		Richard Nixon Republican		Various candidates Other parties		Margin		Total votes cast
County	#	%	#	%	#	%	#	%	Total votes cast
Barnstable	12,423	37.23%	20,900	62.63%	49	0.15%	-8,477	-25.40%	33,372
Berkshire	41,132	59.93%	27,335	39.83%	162	0.24%	13,797	20.10%	68,629
Bristol	130,049	66.79%	64,290	33.02%	383	0.20%	65,759	33.77%	194,722
Dukes	1,282	39.01%	1,998	60.80%	6	0.18%	-716	-21.79%	3,286
Essex	167,875	56.89%	126,599	42.90%	607	0.21%	41,276	13.99%	295,081
Franklin	12,282	43.85%	15,682	55.99%	47	0.17%	-3,400	-12.14%	28,011
Hampden	121,061	62.46%	72,054	37.17%	713	0.37%	49,007	25.29%	193,828
Hampshire	25,667	56.92%	19,346	42.90%	83	0.18%	6,321	14.02%	45,096
Middlesex	356,130	59.01%	246,126	40.78%	1,260	0.21%	110,004	18.23%	603,516
Nantucket	698	36.37%	1,219	63.52%	2	0.10%	-521	-27.15%	1,919
Norfolk	135,474	52.57%	121,744	47.24%	503	0.20%	13,730	5.33%	257,721
Plymouth	57,175	48.31%	60,977	51.52%	197	0.17%	-3,802	-3.21%	118,349
Suffolk	252,823	74.44%	85,750	25.25%	1,044	0.31%	167,073	49.19%	339,617
Worcester	173,103	60.46%	112,730	39.37%	500	0.17%	60,373	21.09%	286,333
Totals	1,487,174	60.22%	976,750	39.55%	5,556	0.22%	510,424	20.67%	2,469,480

==== Counties that flipped from Republican to Democratic ====
- Berkshire
- Bristol
- Essex
- Hampden
- Hampshire
- Middlesex
- Norfolk
- Worcester

== Analysis ==
Kennedy put in a historically strong performance in the state's capital and largest city, Boston, home to many Catholics of Irish and Italian immigrant heritage. In Suffolk County, where Boston is located, Kennedy won a landslide with 74.4% of the vote to Nixon's 25%, the first time in history that a presidential candidate had received more than 70% of the vote in the county. Kennedy was also the first Democrat to carry Norfolk County since Martin van Buren in 1836.

The decisive Democratic win in 1960 would foreshadow the political direction Massachusetts would take in the years to come, as it would become one of the most Democratic states in the nation in the elections that followed. In 1964 and 1968, Democratic nominees Lyndon Johnson and Hubert Humphrey (respectively) would even outperform Kennedy, and in 1972 it would be the only state in the nation to vote for Democrat George McGovern, ultimately making it the only state that Richard Nixon never won in any of his three presidential campaigns.

The 1960 election was also the last time a candidate who declared Massachusetts as his home state won the presidency regardless of his performance in the state. The next three presidential nominees whose home state was Massachusetts, Michael Dukakis, John Kerry, and Mitt Romney, all lost their respective presidential bids.

== See also ==
- United States presidential elections in Massachusetts
