= Oak Hill Park =

Residential subdivision in Newton, Massachusetts, US

Coordinates: 42°17′40.9″N 71°11′9.2″W

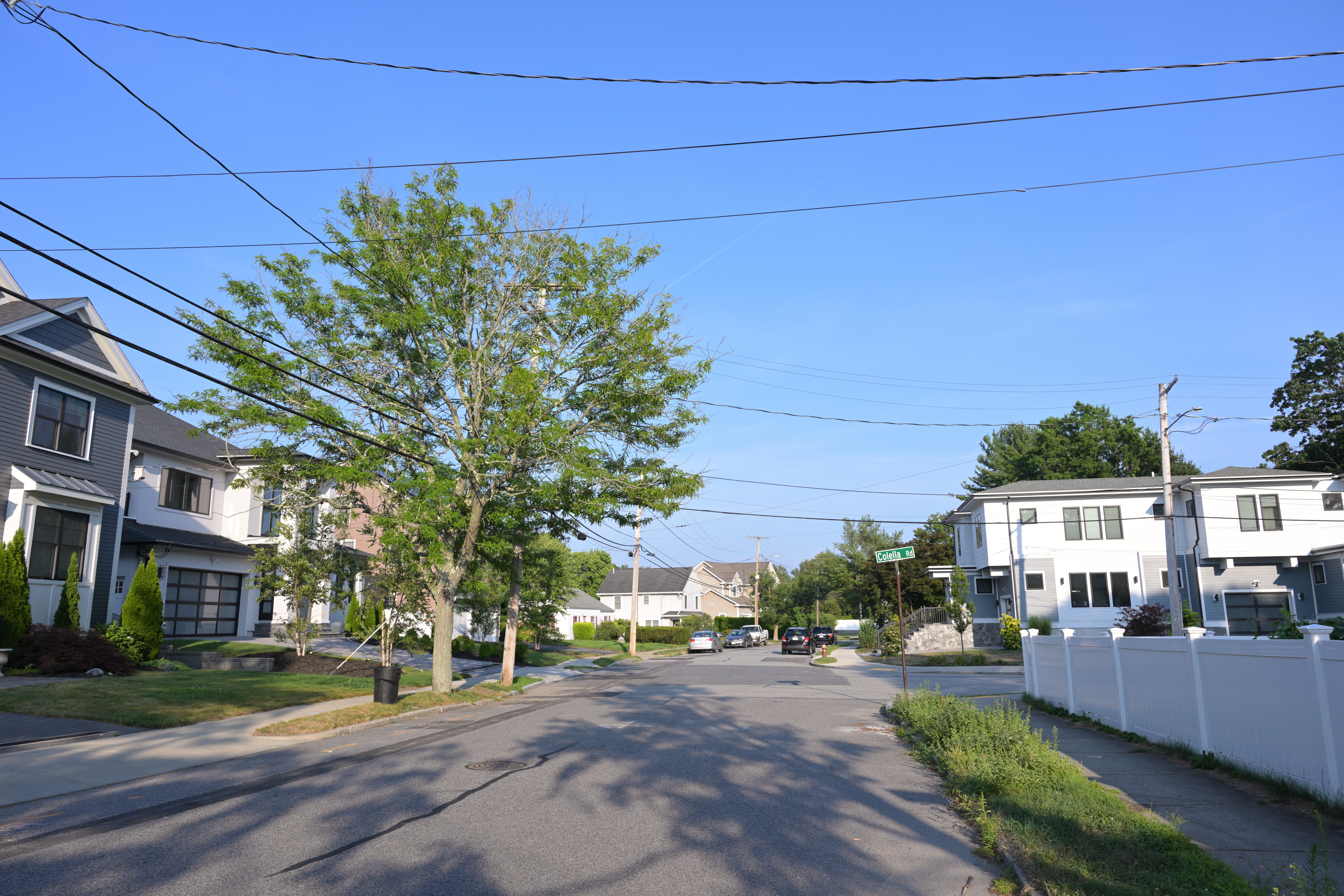
Hanson Road in Oak Hill Park

Oak Hill Park (OHP) is a residential subdivision located in the Oak Hill village of Newton, Middlesex County, Massachusetts. Oak Hill Park is shown as a separate and distinct village on some city maps, including a map dated 2012 on the official City of Newton website. Situated adjacent to Boston (West Roxbury), Oak Hill Park is roughly bounded by Mount Ida College to its northwest, Dedham Street to the northeast, the Charles River to the southwest, and Mount Lebanon Cemetery and the Boston city limit to the southeast.

== Early history ==
The first settler to build a homestead in the area which later became Oak Hill Park was Robert Murdock (b.1665, d.1754) of Roxbury. He purchased 120 acres (0.49 km^{2}) of land from Jonathan Hyde and John Woodward (early settlers of Newton) in 1703, for the sum of £90. The land he purchased, on which he built a homestead, was bounded to the east by land of the Oak Hill School and Dedham Road.

After Murdock died in 1754, the property passed to Capt. Jeremiah Wiswall (b.1725, d.1809), who had been living there since marrying Murdock's daughter Elizabeth (b.1731, d.1769) four years earlier. The Wiswalls were a prominent family of the early Massachusetts Bay Colony, dating back to 1635. Jeremiah Wiswall (after whom Wiswall Road was named) was a great grandson of the founder of this family, Thomas Wiswall. This tract of land would remain the property of the Wiswall family from 1754 until well into the 20th century. With the exception of the adjoining Bigelow Estate and Esty Farm, most of the land upon which Oak Hill Park was eventually built had in fact been the property of the Wiswall family.

The property passed in 1809 from Jeremiah to his son, William Wiswall (b.1796, d.1867). In 1822, James Clement (William Wiswall's brother-in-law) built the house which became known as the Murdock Wiswall House. Wiswall operated the property as a successful dairy and produce farm until his death in 1867. The property next passed to his son (Jeremiah's grandson), William Clement Wiswall (b. 1823, d.1896), who operated the farm until 1884, when his son William Edward Wiswall (b. 1860, d.19??) assumed the leadership role. By 1910, the property was reduced in size to only 28 acres (0.11 km^{2}), with ten to twenty head of dairy cattle. William Edward Wiswall was still living and working on the farm at that time. Many members of the Wiswall family, including Captain Jeremiah, are buried in the Winchester Street Burying Grounds and the Old East Parish Burying Ground, both in Newton. Some time between 1910 and 1946, a large portion of this land passed out of the Wiswall family and came to be owned and used by a business entity known as the Highland Sand and Gravel Pit.

== Post World War II ==
After the conclusion of World War II, there existed in Massachusetts an acute shortage of housing for returning veterans of that war. The City-State Program of Massachusetts was devised as a solution to this problem. This program, approved on May 23, 1946, under Chapter 372 of the 1946 Acts and Resolves of Massachusetts, allowed the city of Newton to borrow and spend money to construct new housing specifically for veterans of World War II.

In January 1948, the City of Newton established the Veterans Housing Department to oversee the development of Oak Hill Park. This agency set the standards and guidelines for the construction, and also sold the houses. A tract of land in the village of Oak Hill in Newton, previously occupied by the Highland Sand and Gravel Pit, was chosen in 1946 as the site to build a new subdivision on which to accommodate returning Newton World War II veterans and their young families. Consisting of 412 homes, a small shopping center and a school, this subdivision was named Oak Hill Park.

In November 1948, the first of these new homes were completed and ready for occupancy. These one-story, three bedroom houses were constructed on concrete slabs with radiant heating - construction atypical of New England and initially viewed with suspicion by some. This suspicion was apparently unwarranted since the market value of some of the original houses is now over $450,000. The cost of a basic house was $7,820; but a homeowner could also add cedar shingles for $319.00; cedar clapboards with gypsum sheathing ($247.00); a breezeway-type porch without a garage ($325.00) or with a garage ($1,250.00); or a detached garage ($925.00). Some homeowners took advantage of these extras when they selected their houses, while others chose to wait and made additions to their houses at a later date.

Shortly after the veterans moved in, they formed the Oak Hill Park Association (OHPA), which dealt with the city and developers, published a monthly newsletter and became the dominant social and political force in the community. The new residents built a playground, planted trees and helped each other build additions to their homes. They put on shows and plays, had block parties and barbecues, and would always be available to help one another. Because of the many children in the area, the Memorial School (now Solomon Schechter Day School) was built.

The Wiswall house which was on Wiswall Road in Oak Hill Park had been abandoned by the 1960s, and was finally demolished in the 1970s after it was gutted by fire. Whether this is the Murdock Wiswall House is unclear; but based on the facts in the "Early History" section above it is likely that this is, in fact, that house. The following picture here, taken in 1935 by Harriette Merrifield Forbes, is of another Wiswall house, located near the north corner of Brookline Street and Dedham Street before its relocation to nearby Carlson Road where it serves, today, as the residence of the President of Mount Ida College. This has also been identified as the Murdock Wiswall House, although that appears to be incorrect for the reasons stated above. The book "Newton" in the "Images of America" series published by Arcadia Publishing, in 1999, shows the rear of what it identifies as the Murdock-Wiswall House, on the bottom of page 24; and this picture is also valuable since it clearly shows the land which later became Oak Hill Park.

The shopping center was later added to OHP and became a vital place to gather for both shopping and socializing. During the period of the 1950s and 1960s most mothers were "at home" and most families had one car, if any. On any day of the week, one could see many mothers and children walking, playing, visiting, shopping, etc.,- a real neighborhood atmosphere and a wonderful place to raise a family. The location was convenient to downtown Boston, while the feeling of OHP was very suburban.

== Neighborhood preservation and development ==
As OHP developed over the years, the OHPA embraced the later developed streets located between Wiswall Road and Spiers Road, including the south side of Dedham Street. OHP bought up park land along the Charles River to protect it from development, as well as building the Shuman Centre, a small house-like building close to the shopping center. This served as a community center and home for the now closed branch library (once located at the northern end of the shopping center, and later in Room 8 of Memorial School). OHP also successfully stopped development on an extension of Saw Mill Brook Parkway that would have connected with the Wells Office Park and sent rush hour traffic zipping through the heart of OHP.

Today, OHP remains a "neighborhood" in an age when many have disappeared. Its residents comprise a congenial mixture of ethnic and economic backgrounds, ages, vocations, interests and talents. The OHPA now includes 650 families. While the shopping center no longer has a grocery store (first Market Basket, then Prime Food Market), a pharmacy (Oak Park Pharmacy), a dry cleaners (Chiswick Cleaners) or a gas station (The Prioli Brothers), it does now have a pizza parlor (which delivers), a hair salon and a plumber, as well as a few condominiums. The western end of Saw Mill Brook Parkway leads to walking trails along the Charles River, eventually leading south to West Roxbury's Millennium Park. Boundary markers for the old Newton Water Works can be found in this area, which is an excellent destination for those wishing to view typical glacial topography -- eskers, drumlins, kettle holes and moraines abound. Transmitter towers for WUNR radio (once WVOM, and later WBOS, at 1600 kHz) are located at the edge of this land, just off Spiers Road and Saw Mill Brook Parkway.

== Street and path names ==
Oak Hill Park is a living memorial to World War II veterans. One of the first acts of the Veterans Housing Department was to choose the names for the 33 streets and paths in the neighborhood. They chose to name them all after Newton servicemen who had died in World War II. On April 14, 1948, a lottery was held to choose the names from a submitted list of 261 Newton citizens. The 33 names now identified with Oak Hill Park were drawn impartially from this list, while the remaining 228 names were memorialized when the Memorial Elementary School was dedicated in their honor.

Street or path	Named after	Notes
Antonellis Circle	Joseph T. Antonellis (1916–1944)	Corporal, United States Army, Chemical Warfare
Avery Path	George L. Avery (1925–1945)	
Bontempo Road	Peter A. Bontempo (1922–1945)	Private First Class, United States Army
Caldon Path	Albert T. Caldon (1918–1944)	Corporal, United States Army
Callahan Path	William F. Callahan, Jr. (1920–1942)	Second Lieutenant, 85th Mt. Infantry Reg. United States Army (the Callahan Tunnel in Boston was also named after him)
Caulfield Circle	John L. Caulfield (1917–1944)	First Lieutenant, United States Army (KIA, Omaha Beach)
Cavanaugh Path	Paul R. Cavanaugh (1921–1944)	Sergeant, United States Army Air Forces, Tailgunner B24 Liberator
Chinian Path	Sarkis Chinian (1924–1945)	Private First Class, United States Marine Corps
Cibel Path	Harvey J. Cibel (1918–1943)	Second Lieutenant, United States Army Air Forces
Colella Road	Russell C. Colella (1913–1944)	
Considine Road	Wilfred B. Considine (1920–1944)	Technical Sergeant, United States Army Air Forces
Early Path	Lawrence Early (1896–1944)	Captain, United States Army
Esty Farm Road	Amos Esty	original owner of Esty Farm, who purchased the land sometime between 1848 and 1855
Fredette Road	Francis A. Fredette (1906–1944)	CM 1/c United States Navy
Hanson Road	Robert M. Hanson (1922–1944)	First Lieutenant, United States Marine Corps Aviation (Medal of Honor)
Hay Road	John S. Hay (1919–1943)	United States Army Air Forces
Kappius Path	Mainolph Valen Kappius (1899–1945)	Commander, Medical Corps, United States Navy Reserve (Flight Surgeon)
Keller Path	H. Russell Keller, Jr. (1916–1945)	Lieutenant, United States Navy Aviation
Kerr Path	William J. Kerr (1921–1942)	Electrician's Mate, 3/c United States Navy
McCarthy Road	Francis P. McCarthy (1917–1942)	Captain, United States Marine Corps Aviation (Distinguished Flying Cross)
Nightingale Path	William E. Nightingale (1924–1945)	Flight Officer Royal Canadian Air Force
O'Connell Road	Frederick P. O'Connell (1921–1944)	Corporal, VMCR Class III-C
O'Rourke Path	John J. O'Rourke (1908–1942)	Specialist 5/c United States Army
Osborne Path	William H. Osborne (1913–1945)	Sergeant, United States Army Air Forces
Shumaker Path	Robert Shumaker (1924–1944)	Ensign, United States Navy Aviation – 2nd Lt. United States Marine Corps (NAVC)
Shute Path	George B. Shute (1923–1945)	Private, United States Army
Spiers Road	William A. Spiers (1924–1944)	Private First Class, United States Marine Corps
Stein Circle	Robert F. Stein (1920–1944)	Co. C 101st United States Army
Timson Path	Frederick H. Timson, Jr. (1906–1945)	Private, United States Army Air Forces
Tocci Path	Nicholas Tocci (1920–1945)	Private, United States Army
Van Roosen Road	Hugh Van Roosen (1922–1943)	LTJG, United States Navy (Purple Heart and Navy Cross). Graduate of United States Naval Academy.
Van Wart Path	Paul H. Van Wart (1922–1945)	Sergeant, United States Army Air Forces
Walsh Road	George E. Walsh (1906–1945)	
Wiswall Road	Noah Wiswall (1699–1786) and Jeremiah Wiswall (1725–1809)	Captain, East Newton Company of Minutemen, Concord and Dorchester, American Revolutionary War. Noah Wiswall was wounded at the Battle of Lexington.
Young Path	Frank W. Young, Jr. (1912–1944)	Sergeant, United States Army

== See also ==
- Oak Hill, Massachusetts
