= Crafts Street City Stable =

- U.S. National Register of Historic Places
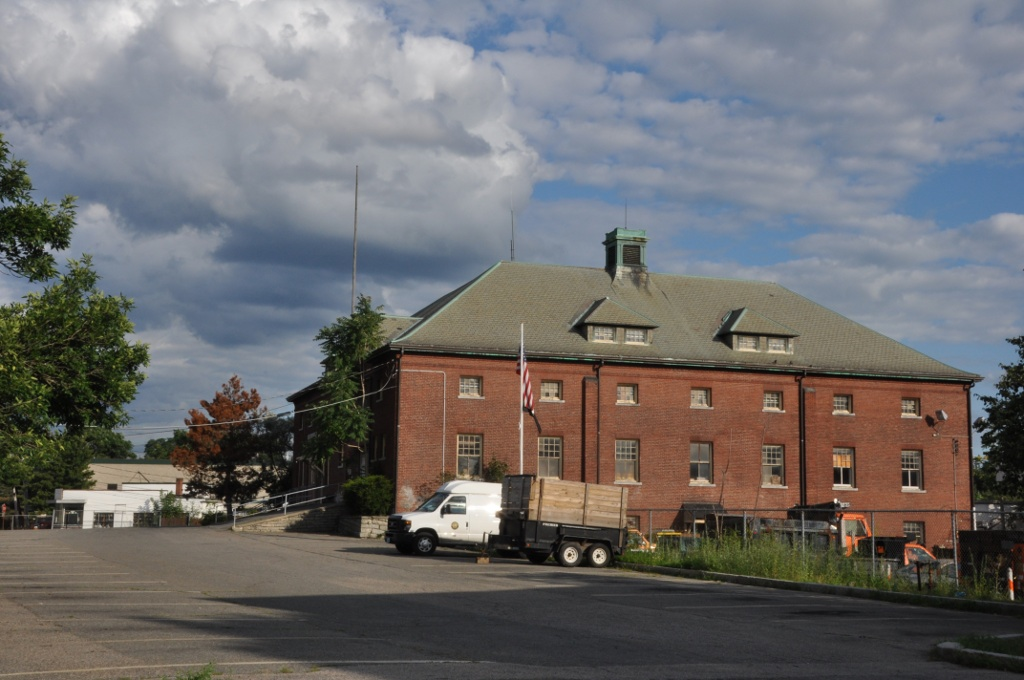
- Crafts Street City Stable

- Location within Massachusetts Location within the United States
- Location: 90 Crafts St., Newton, Massachusetts
- Coordinates: 42°21′19″N 71°12′13″W
- Area: less than one acre
- Built: 1895
- Architect: William F. Goodwin
- Architectural style: Colonial Revival
- MPS: Newton MRA
- NRHP reference No.: 09001095
- Added to NRHP: December 18, 2009

The Crafts Street City Stable is a historic redbrick public works building located at 90 Crafts Street near Ashmont Avenue in Newton, Massachusetts. Designed for $375 by Boston-based architect and Newton resident William F. Goodwin in the Colonial Revival style of architecture, it was built in 1895 for the city of Newton at a cost of $25,000 to serve as additional stable for its then Highway Department. Over the years, it was converted to a city garage and is now called the Crafts Street Garage. It forms the focal point for the city's Department of Public Works complex. On December 18, 2009, the building along with a 20-foot perimeter strip around it was added to the National Register of Historic Places.

== See also ==
- City Stable and Garage
- National Register of Historic Places listings in Newton, Massachusetts
