= Alexander Altmann =

Orthodox Jewish scholar

Rabbi Alexander Altmann
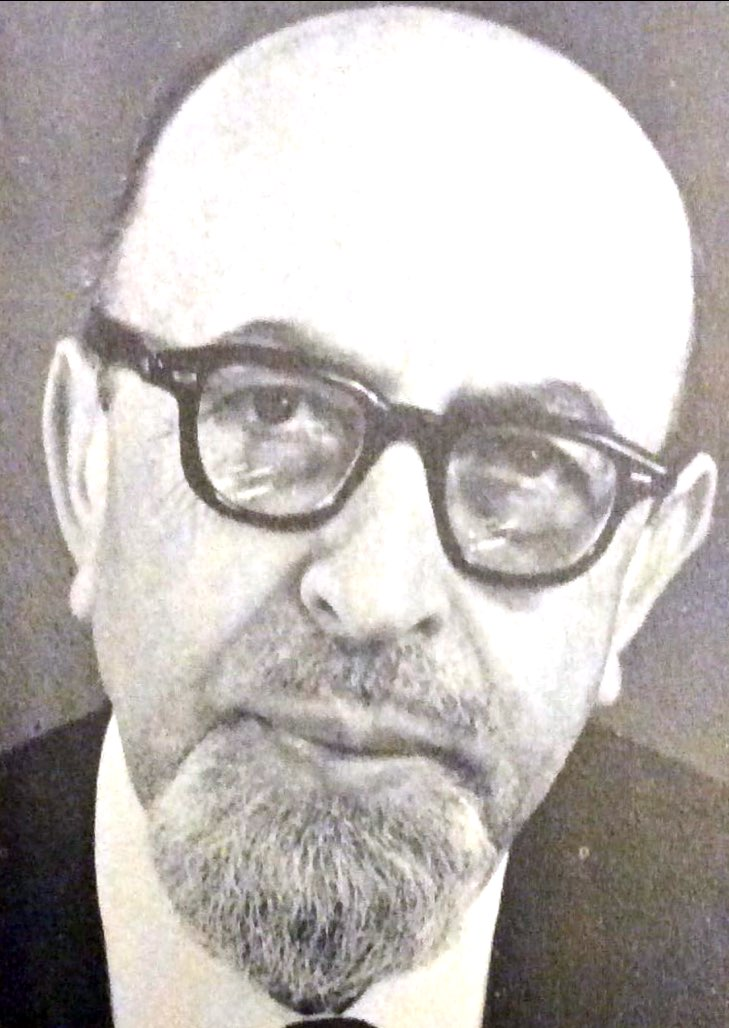
- Alexander Altmann
- Born: April 16, 1906; Kassa, Austria-Hungary (present-day Košice, Slovakia)
- Died: June 6, 1987 (aged 81); Boston, U.S.A.
- Education: University of Berlin
- Occupations: Scholar, Rabbi
- Known for: Leading Mendelssohn scholar, studies in Jewish mysticism
- Awards: Fellow of the American Academy of Arts and Sciences

Alexander Altmann (April 16, 1906 – June 6, 1987) was an Orthodox Jewish scholar and rabbi born in Kassa, Austria-Hungary (present-day Košice, Slovakia). He emigrated to England in 1938 and later settled in the United States, working productively for a decade and a half as a professor within the Philosophy Department at Brandeis University. He is best known for his studies of the thought of Moses Mendelssohn, and was indeed the leading Mendelssohn scholar since the time of Mendelssohn himself. He also made important contributions to the study of Jewish mysticism, and for a large part of his career he was the only scholar in the United States working on this subject in a purely academic setting. Among the many Brandeis students whose work he supervised in this area were Elliot Wolfson, Arthur Green, Heidi Ravven, Paul Mendes-Flohr, Lawrence Fine, and Daniel Matt.

== Biography ==
Altmann was a son of Malwine Weisz and Adolf Altmann (1879–1944), the Chief Rabbi of Trier, one of the oldest Jewish communities in Germany. He received his Ph.D. in philosophy from the University of Berlin in 1931, writing his dissertation on the philosophy of Max Scheler, and was ordained rabbi by the Hildesheimer Rabbinical Seminary of Berlin in the same year. From 1931 to 1938 he served as rabbi in Berlin and professor of Jewish philosophy at the seminary. After fleeing Nazi Germany in 1938, Altmann served as communal rabbi in Manchester, England from 1938 to 1959. He was elected to membership of the Manchester Literary and Philosophical Society in 1942. In Manchester, in addition to his responsibilities as a community leader, he continued to independently pursue his scholarly studies, publishing in 1946 a translation and commentary of Saadia's Beliefs and Opinions. His scholarly activities ultimately led him to found and direct the Institute of Jewish Studies from 1953 to 1958, which at the time was an independent institution. He there edited the Journal of Jewish Studies and Scripta Judaica and authored his work on Isaac Israeli. While Altmann was at Manchester, Bert Trautmann, a former soldier for Nazi Germany and prisoner of war, was being considered as a player for Manchester City Football Club, which had many Jewish fans; Altmann approved, despite the Nazis having killed his parents and other family members. Altmann's intervention may have been decisive for the unprecedented acceptance of a former POW into the team. Trautmann went on to become a very successful goalkeeper.

After securing the future of the Institute of Jewish Studies by bringing it under the auspices of the University College London, in 1959 Altmann left England to join the faculty of Brandeis University in Waltham, Massachusetts, US. Aged 53 at this time and the author of almost 100 publications, the Brandeis appointment was Altmann's first university position. He served at Brandeis as the Philip W. Lown Professor of Jewish Philosophy and History of Ideas beginning in 1959 and until his promotion to professor emeritus and subsequent retirement in 1976. He was elected a Fellow of the American Academy of Arts and Sciences in 1967. According to Alfred Ivry, Altmann was also a major force in acquiring for Brandeis the complete Vatican Library Hebraica collection on microfilm.

From 1976 to 1978 Altmann was a visiting professor at Harvard and at the Hebrew University, and from 1978 until his death he was an associate at the Harvard University Center for Jewish Studies. During his entire residence in the Boston area (Newton Centre to be precise), he always made his home a meeting place for Jewish scholars and students, often hosting them for Sabbath meals. Altmann's thirst for new knowledge never abated, even in his later years. Lawrence Fine tells of attending a class on Coptic language given at Brandeis University in the early seventies, only to find there—as a fellow student—the 65-year-old Altmann, eager to acquire a new skill.

In 1983 Professor Altmann joined a newly established Orthodox synagogue in Newton, Massachusetts, Congregation Shaarei Tefillah. He served as senior member of the synagogue's Rabbinical Committee, whose other members were his Brandeis colleagues, Professors Nahum Sarna and Marvin Fox, Professor Lester Segal of UMass Boston, and Professor Louis Dickstein of Wellesley College.

In addition to regular attendance at synagogue services and committee meetings, Professor Altmann delivered memorable sermons and learned lectures. He also described his experiences as a pulpit rabbi in Berlin in the 1930s, when he delivered messages of support to growing numbers of Jews finding their way back to synagogue life in the face of the growing Nazi threat. He had to encode these messages, to avoid provoking Gestapo agents in attendance to monitor homiletic subversion. As observed by his dear friend, Professor Jacob Katz, in a eulogy that later appeared in print, Professor Altmann was deeply invigorated by the opportunities afforded him by Shaarei Tefillah to deliver sermons and learned discourses once again in a synagogue setting.

He left Germany with his family in 1938 to accept a rabbinical post in Manchester, England. As a candidate for the position, he was expected to give a sermon there in English. He wrote it out in German and presented it in translation. By 1983 he had not just mastered English but learned to speak it with remarkable eloquence.(≤https://www.shaarei.org/≥)

Altmann died in Boston, U.S.A. on June 6, 1987.

== Works ==
In his long academic career, Altmann produced a number of important works in German, English, and Hebrew, some of which are listed below. For a brief period of time in his early career he involved himself with the construction of a Jewish theology, but this work was left unfinished, and his primary interests turned to medieval Jewish philosophy and mysticism, and particularly the work of the iconoclastic Jewish philosopher Moses Mendelssohn. Among his goals in undertaking his work on Mendelssohn were the restoration to this important Jewish figure his rightful recognition as an original philosopher and profound reasoner, not just a popularizer of Enlightenment thought. His work on Isaac Israeli, the first medieval Jewish philosopher, likewise rescued this thinker from what he saw as undeserved obscurity.

In his Maimonides on the Intellect and the Scope of Metaphysics (1986), Altmann differed with Shlomo Pines' 1979 interpretation of Maimonides as a philosophical skeptic, arguing that Maimonides saw genuine value in the philosophical enterprise, and believed it could yield genuine truths.

A complete bibliography of Altmann's nearly 250 published works is presented in Bibliography of the published writings of Alexander Altmann. Some of the most popular are listed below:

- Saadya Gaon: Book of Doctrines and Beliefs (abridged edition translated from the Arabic with an introduction and notes), in Three Jewish Philosophers, Atheneum, New York, 1969
- with Samuel Miklos Stern: Isaac Israeli: A Neoplatonic Philosopher of the Early Tenth Century. His Works Translated with Comments and an Outline of His Philosophy, Oxford University Press, 1958, reprinted, Greenwood Press, 1979.
- Biblical Motifs: Origins and Transformations, Harvard University Press, 1966.
- Moses Mendelssohn's Fruehschriften zur Metaphysik, Mohr (Tuebingen, Germany), 1969.
- Studies in Religious Philosophy and Mysticism, Cornell University Press, 1969.
- Moses Mendelssohn: A Biographical Study, University of Alabama Press, 1973.
- Essays in Jewish Intellectual History, University Press of New England for Brandeis University Press, 1981.
- Essays in Judaism (in Hebrew), Tel-Aviv, 1982.'
- Altmann, Alexander, and Alfred L. Ivry. The Meaning of Jewish Existence: Theological Essays, 1930-1939. [Waltham, Mass.]: Brandeis University Press, 1991.

== Collections ==
The papers of the Altmann family (including Alexander) were presented by the family to University College London in 2000. The Leo Baeck Institute holds an archive of Altmann's research.
