= City Stable and Garage =

- U.S. National Register of Historic Places
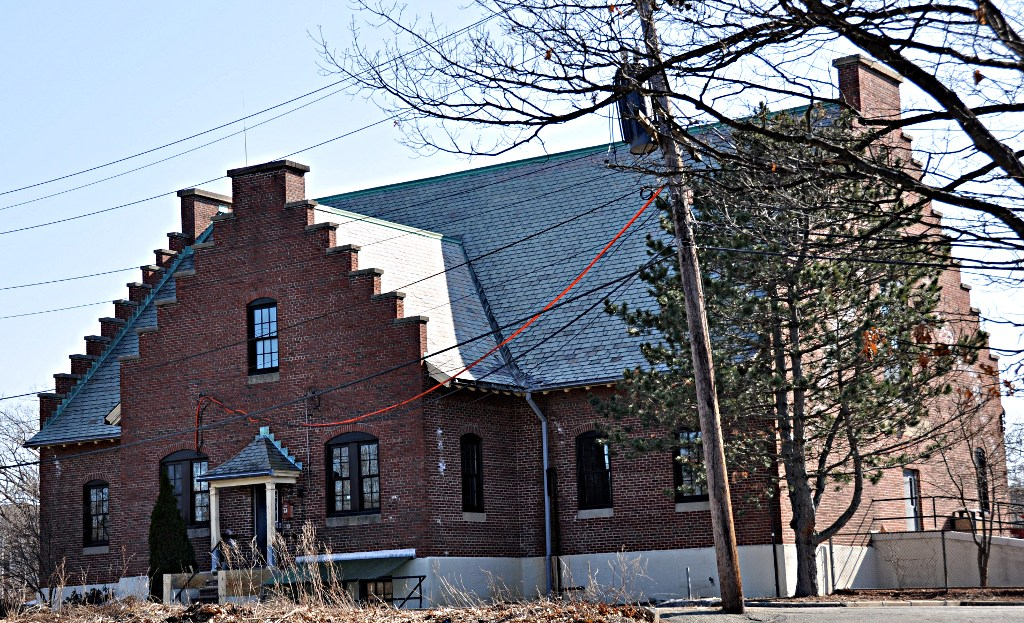

- Location within Massachusetts Location within the United States
- Location: 74 Elliot St., Newton, Massachusetts
- Coordinates: 42°18′57″N 71°12′50″W
- Built: 1926
- Architect: Colby, Herbert W.
- Architectural style: Flemish Revival
- MPS: Newton MRA
- NRHP reference No.: 90000022
- Added to NRHP: February 16, 1990

The City Stable and Garage is a historic public works building at 74 Elliot Street in Newton, Massachusetts. The 1.5-story brick building was built in 1926–27, and represents a transitional period between the use of horse-drawn equipment and the advent of combustion-powered vehicles. Built on a hillside, it has a fully exposed basement with four garage bays, while its main level originally housed 26 horse stalls. It was designed, however, so that the main floor could be converted to automotive use when horses were no longer needed. The building is also a fine example of Flemish Revival design, with stepped gable ends.

The building was listed on the National Register of Historic Places in 1990.

== See also ==
- Crafts Street City Stable
- National Register of Historic Places listings in Newton, Massachusetts
