= John A. Fenno House =

Historic house in Massachusetts, United States

- U.S. National Register of Historic Places
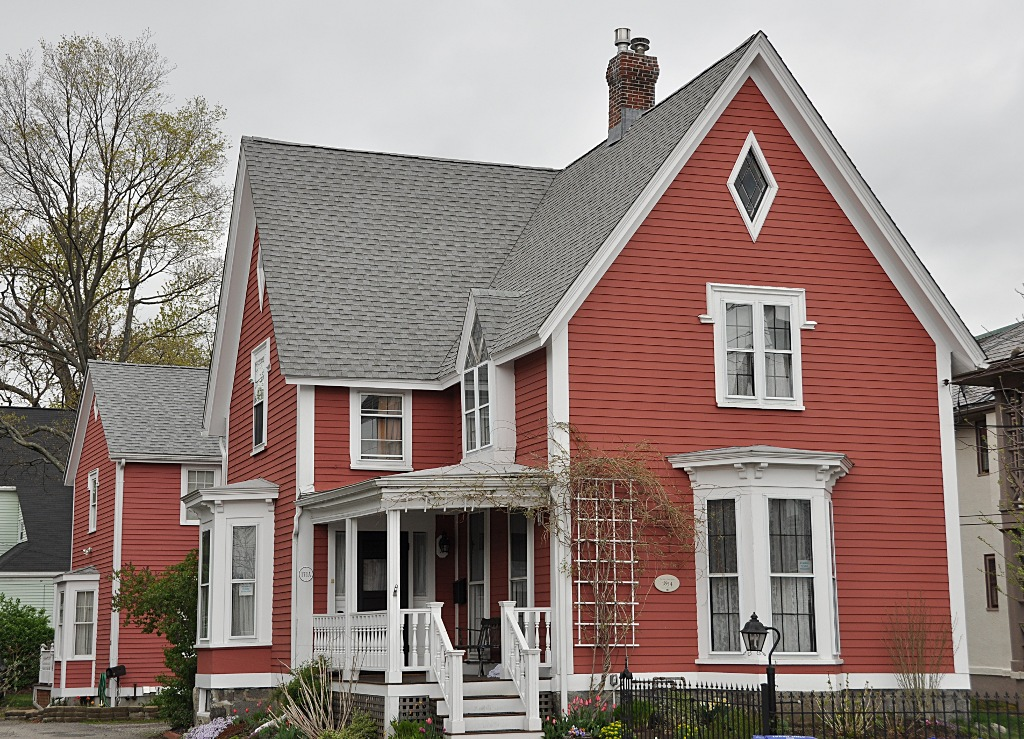

- Location within Massachusetts Location within the United States
- Location: 171 Lowell Ave., Newton, Massachusetts
- Coordinates: 42°21′05.2″N 71°12′38.3″W
- Built: 1854
- Architectural style: Gothic Revival
- MPS: Newton MRA
- NRHP reference No.: 86001800
- Added to NRHP: September 04, 1986

The John A. Fenno House is a historic house at 171 Lowell Avenue in Newton, Massachusetts. The 2 1/2-story wood-frame house was built c. 1854, and is a rare local example of Gothic Revival styling. It has an L-shaped plan with steeply gabled roof, diamond windows in the gable ends, and first-floor polygonal bays whose roof lines are bracketed. It was built for John Fenno, who later served as Newton's ninth mayor. When built, it stood at Walnut Street and Madison Avenue; it was moved to this location about 1885.

The house was listed on the National Register of Historic Places in 1986.

== See also ==
- National Register of Historic Places listings in Newton, Massachusetts
