= Oak Hill, Massachusetts =

Village in Massachusetts, United States

Coordinates: 42°18′12.35″N 71°11′11.19″W

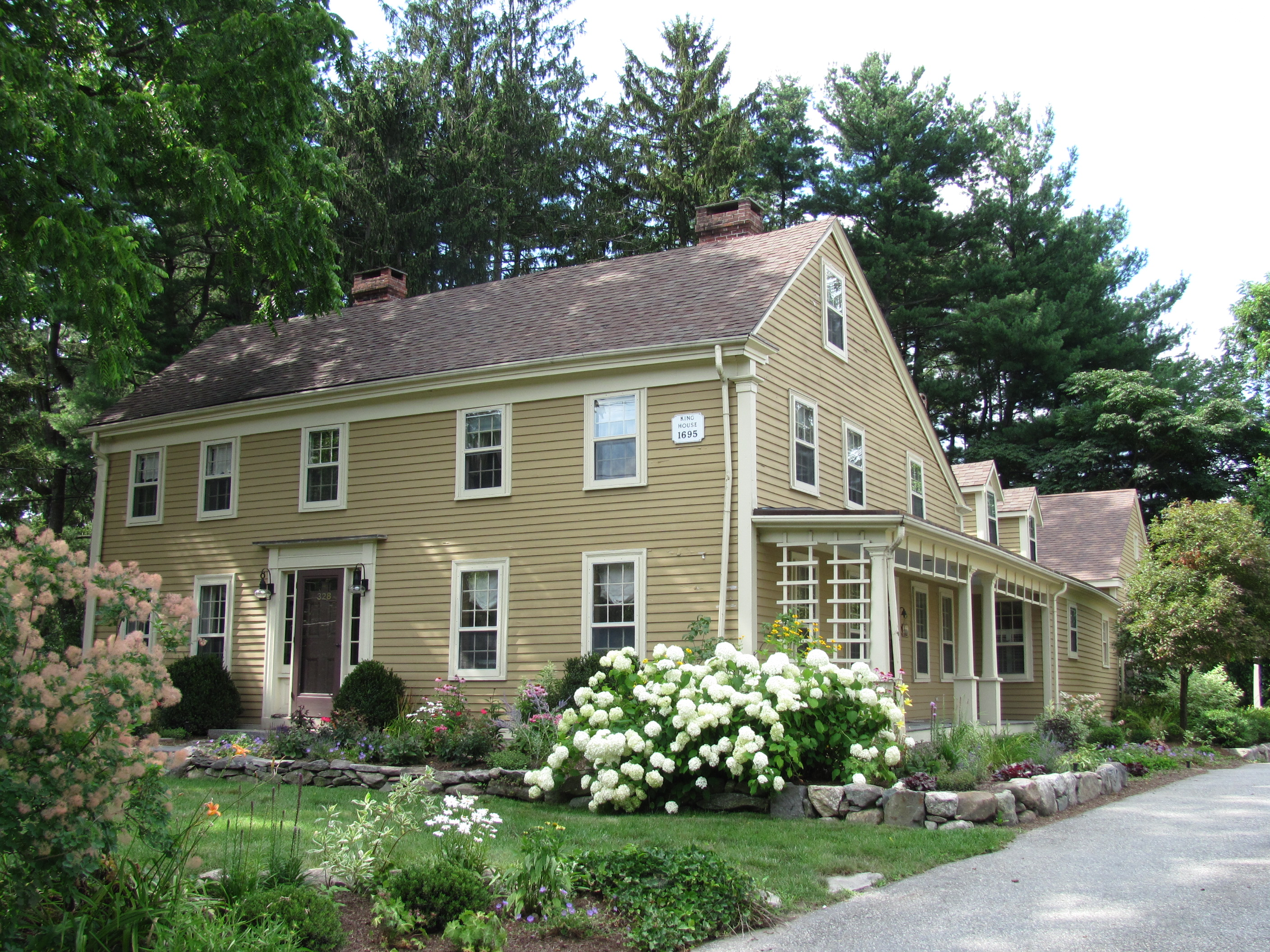
The King House, a building on the National Register of Historic Places

Oak Hill is one of the thirteen villages within the city of Newton in Middlesex County, Massachusetts, United States.

== History and geography ==
This village is situated on a landform known since the mid-17th century as Oak Hill, and one of the seven principal elevations of Newton (the others being Nonantum Hill, Waban Hill, Chestnut Hill, Bald Pate Hill, Institution Hill, and Mount Ida).

Oak Hill Park, a post-World War II subdivision of approximately 412 houses was built on a gravel quarry for the returning GIs. The Oak Hill Park development coincided with expansion in housing in various areas of Newton following the war, when underdeveloped land was utilized to create affordable housing for the returning veterans. Many of these original post-World War II houses still exist while others have been replaced with newer, usually larger homes.

== Education ==
=== K–12 education ===
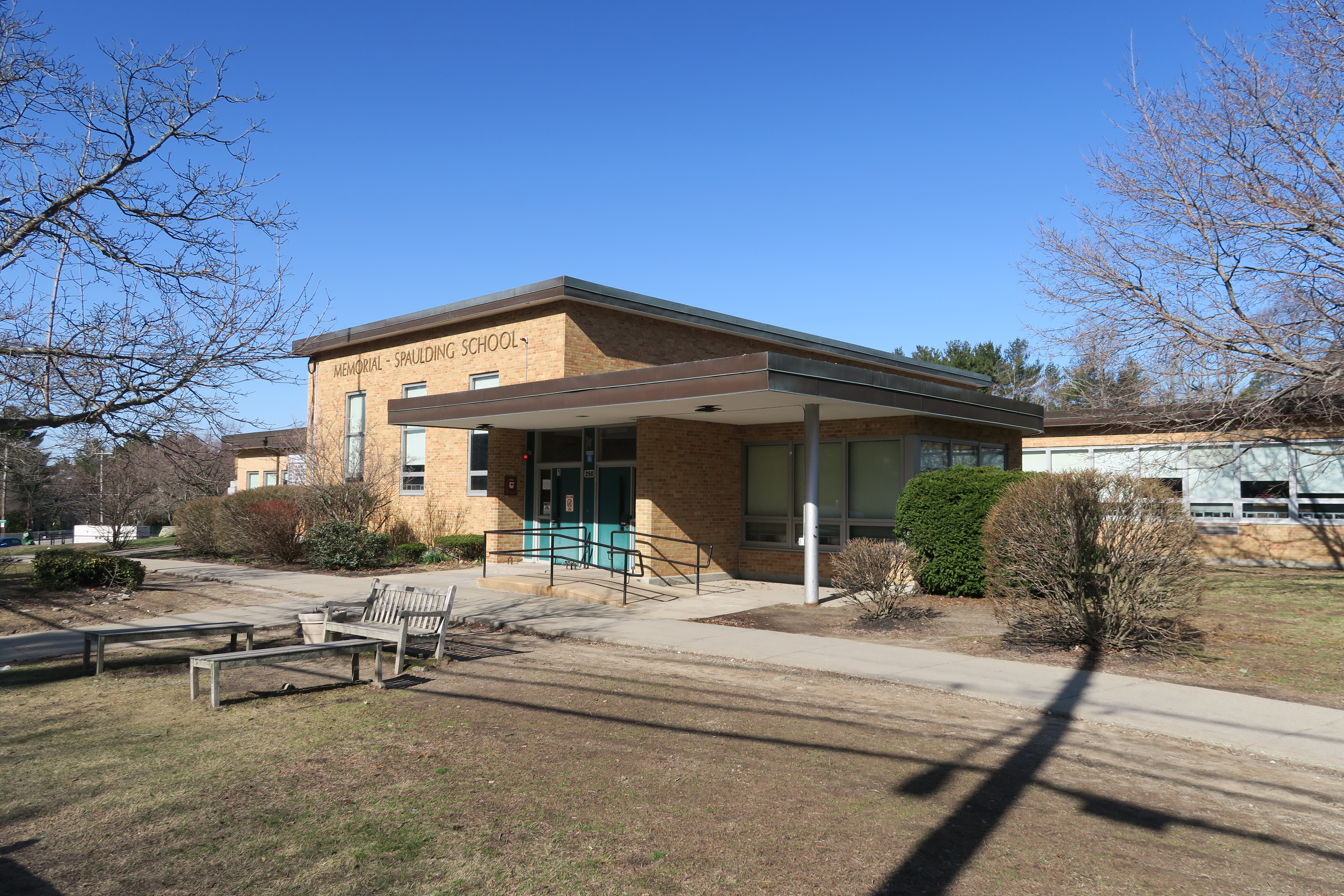
Memorial Spaulding Elementary School

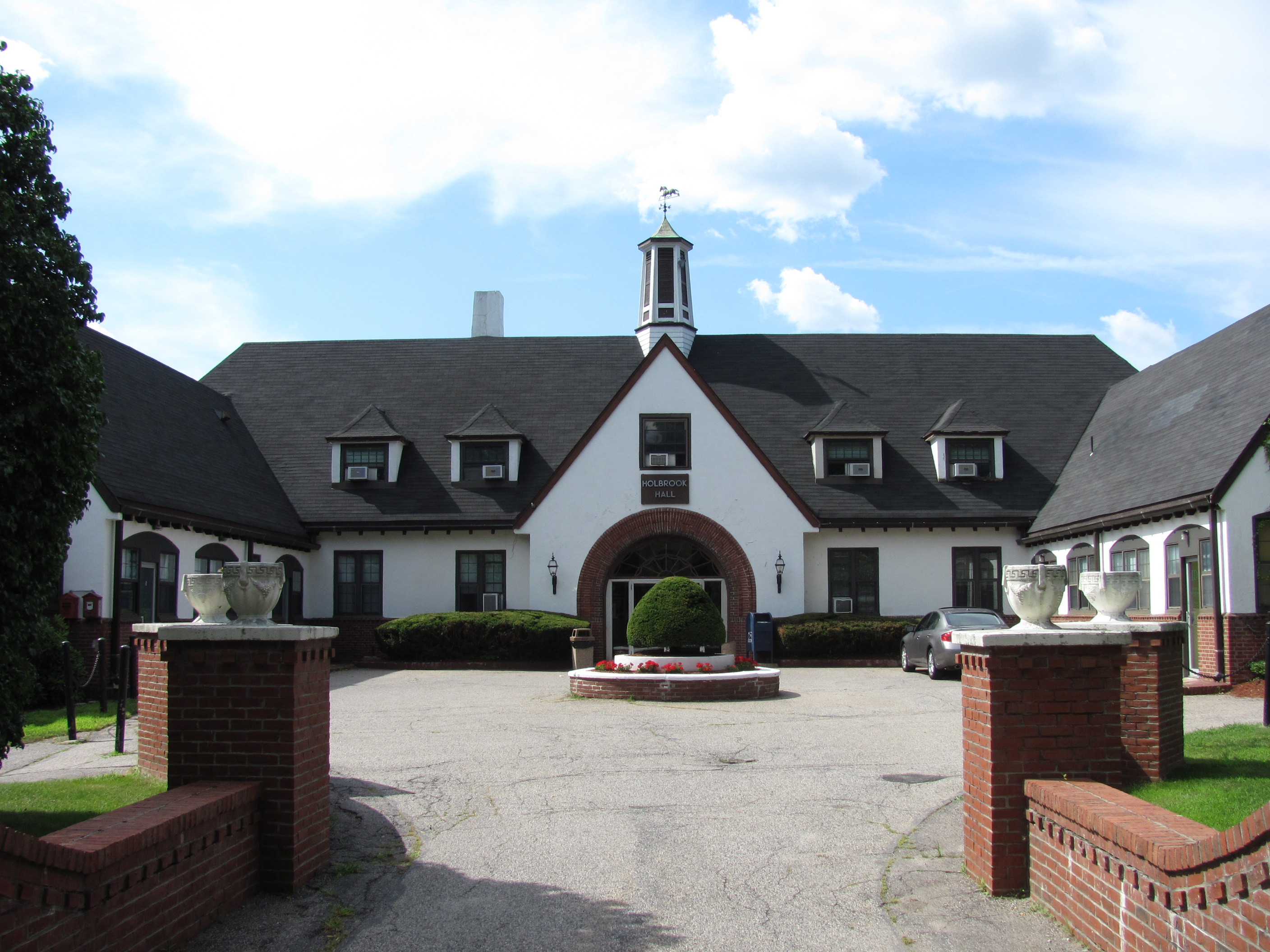
Holbrook Hall at Mount Ida College

- Memorial Spaulding Elementary School, a public elementary school operated by Newton Public Schools located on Brookline Street
- Oak Hill Middle School, a public middle school operated by Newton Public Schools located on Wheeler Road
- Charles E. Brown Middle School, a public middle school operated by Newton Public Schools located on Meadowbrook Road
- Newton South High School, a public high school operated by Newton Public Schools located on Brandeis Road

=== Colleges and universities ===
- The Mount Ida Campus of the University of Massachusetts Amherst, a public university. It was previously Mount Ida College, a private college that closed in 2018 after financial difficulties.
- William James College, a private college of psychology, formerly the Massachusetts School of Professional Psychology

== Historic landmarks ==
- Dr. Henry Jacob Bigelow House, 72–80 Ober Rd
- Working Boys Home, 333 Nahanton St
