= House at 173–175 Ward Street =

Historic house in Massachusetts, United States

- U.S. National Register of Historic Places
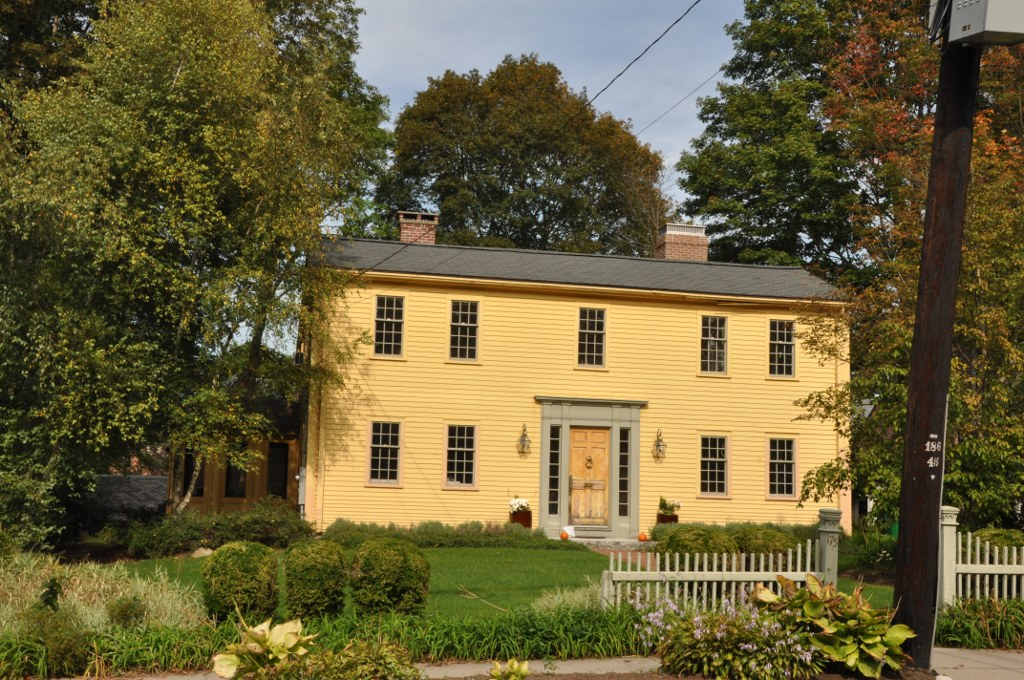

- Location within Massachusetts Location within the United States
- Location: 173–175 Ward St., Newton, Massachusetts
- Coordinates: 42°20′19.7″N 71°10′47.0″W
- Built: 1800
- Architectural style: Federal
- MPS: Newton MRA
- NRHP reference No.: 86001820
- Added to NRHP: September 4, 1986

The house at 173–175 Ward Street in Newton, Massachusetts, United States, is one of the city's few federal style houses. Built c. 1800, it is a 2 1/2-story wood-frame structure with clapboard siding and twin rear wall chimneys. The house has a five-bay facade with windows framed by narrow moulding. The main entrance is flanked by paired pilasters surrounding sidelight windows, topped by an entablature. The house was built by Charles Hyde and was involved in property disputes attending the construction of tunnels in the area in the mid-19th century.

The house was listed on the National Register of Historic Places in 1986.

== See also ==
- National Register of Historic Places listings in Newton, Massachusetts
