= Joanne Langione Dance Center =

Coordinates: 42.3488°N 71.2309°W

- Newton, Massachusetts; USA

Information
- Motto: "Where children learn to dance in an atmosphere of love and support"
- Established: 1976
- Director: Joanne Langione
- Faculty: 15
- Age range: 9 months - 18 years old
- Enrollment: ~1000
- Website: jldancecenter.com

Founded in Newton, Massachusetts, in 1976, the Joanne Langione Dance Center was the first American youth dance school centered on a developmental and avocational model rather than a competitive one. Currently the dance center offers instruction to students between 9 months and 18 years old in classical ballet, modern dance, contemporary dance, jazz, hip-hop and tap dance, with ballet exams administered annually by the American Academy of Ballet. The school stages sixteen public performances each year.

The school's toddler dance program, "Playdance," developed upon the cognitive insight that the sequence of music and movement constitute "brilliant neurological exercises" in early childhood, was featured on the PBS Documentary and WCVB series for Lifetime, Your Baby and Child, with Dr. Penelope Leach. The school's first complement of "Playdance" graduates was featured on Bob McGrath's Sesame Street tour in 1988.
