= Crystal Lake (Newton, Massachusetts) =

Lake in Newton, Massachusetts

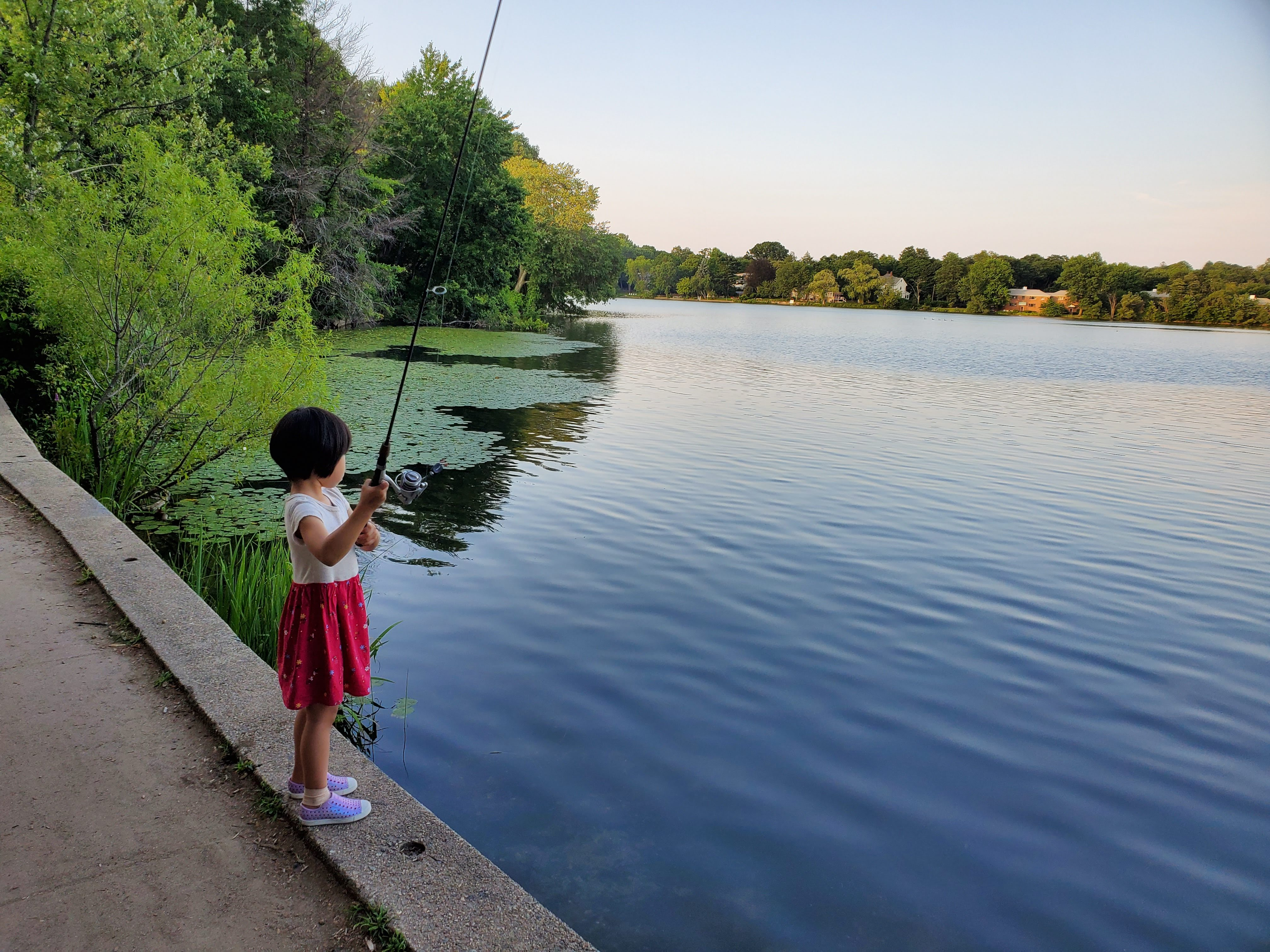
- Fishing

- Location within Greater Boston area Location within Massachusetts Location within the United States
- Location: Newton, Massachusetts
- Coordinates: 42°19′38″N 71°12′01″W
- Primary outflows: Charles River
- Basin countries: United States
- Surface area: 33 acres (13 ha)
- Max. depth: 31 ft (9.4 m)
- Water volume: 142,000,000 US gal (436 acre⋅ft)
- Surface elevation: 141 ft (43 m)
- Settlements: Newton Centre, Massachusetts

Crystal Lake is a 33-acre (130,000 m^{2}) natural great pond located in Newton, Massachusetts. Its shores, mostly lined with private homes, also host two small parks and a designated swimming area with a bathhouse.

== Description ==
Crystal Lake sits at 141 ft (43 m) above sea level. Its maximum depth is 31 ft (9.4 m), and its total volume is about 142,000,000 US gal (436 acre⋅ft). It measures about 1,200 ft (370 m) from north to south and 1,000 ft (300 m) from east to west, and has a circumference of about one mile. A spring with subterranean sources, Crystal Lake drains into the South Meadow Brook, which joins the Charles River in Newton Upper Falls, from which it flows into the Atlantic Ocean at Boston Harbor.

== History ==
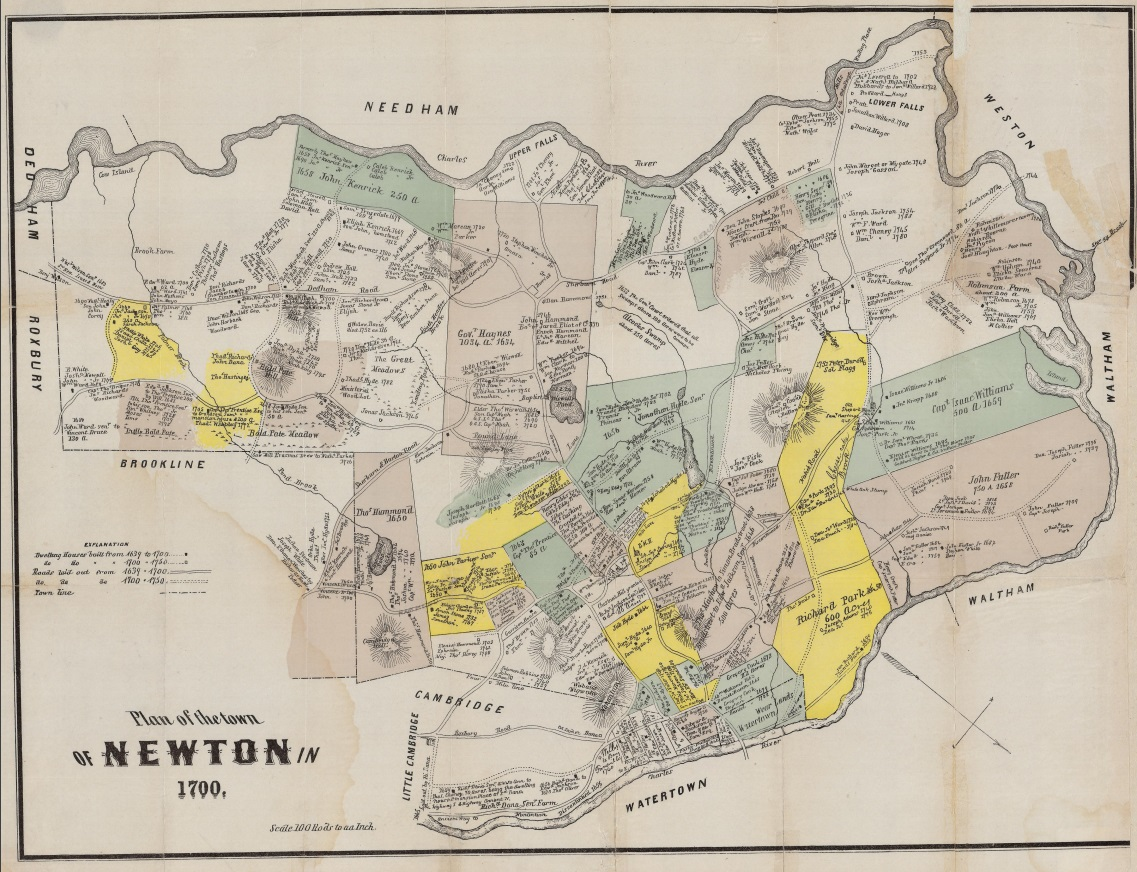
Wiswall's Pond can be seen in the center of this map of the city of Newton, drawn in 1700

Thomas Wiswall built a house in 1654 on the southwestern shore of the pond, beside what was then known as the Dedham Trail (now known as Centre Street). From that time until sometime after 1855, the pond became known as "Wiswall's Pond". Wiswall's great-grandson, Noah Wiswall, dismantled the original house and replaced it with a more modern structure in 1744. In 1780, Noah Wiswall donated a piece of land to a group of people who constructed a Baptist church at the southern shore of the pond, near the modern-day intersection of Old Rogers Street and Centre Street. The pond was sometimes called "Baptist Pond" during the first half of the nineteenth century because it was used for baptisms by the First Baptist Church in Newton.

Around 1804, the Wiswall property passed into the possession of the Paul family. The Paul family began to use the lake for commercial ice harvesting, and they built an ice house there in the 1850s. The ice house sat at the western edge of the lake, near the intersection of present-day Centre Street and Norwood Avenue. Sometime between 1855 and 1875, the name of the pond was changed from "Wiswall's Pond" to "Crystal Lake" for marketing purposes.

George Henry Ellis (1848–1934) owned the Crystal Lake Ice Company from the late 1800s until at least 1915. The Crystal Lake Ice House was used until it was destroyed in a fire in 1915. A new facility was constructed near the intersection of Walnut and Beacon Street. The company was eventually taken over by Metropolitan Ice Company, and was finally closed and dismantled in 1933.

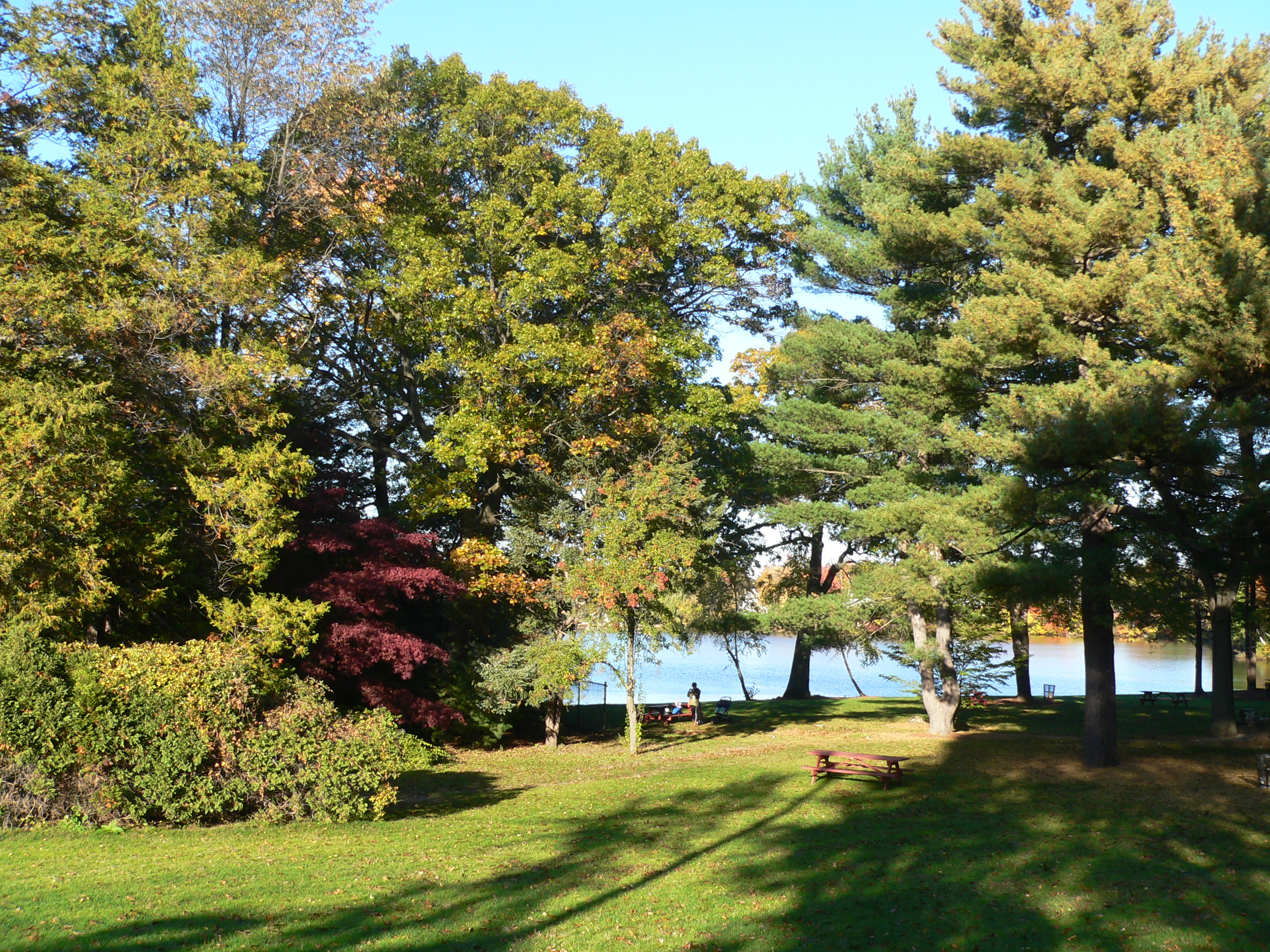
Land acquired in 2007 to expand Crystal Lake Park

In 2007, the City of Newton used Community Preservation Act funds to acquire by eminent domain a one-acre parcel at 20 Rogers Street, a property next to the swimming beach and bath house. The following year, the city purchased an easement on an adjacent property, 230 Lake Avenue, and built a lakeside path connecting the swimming beach park to the nearby park at Levingston Cove.

== Image gallery ==
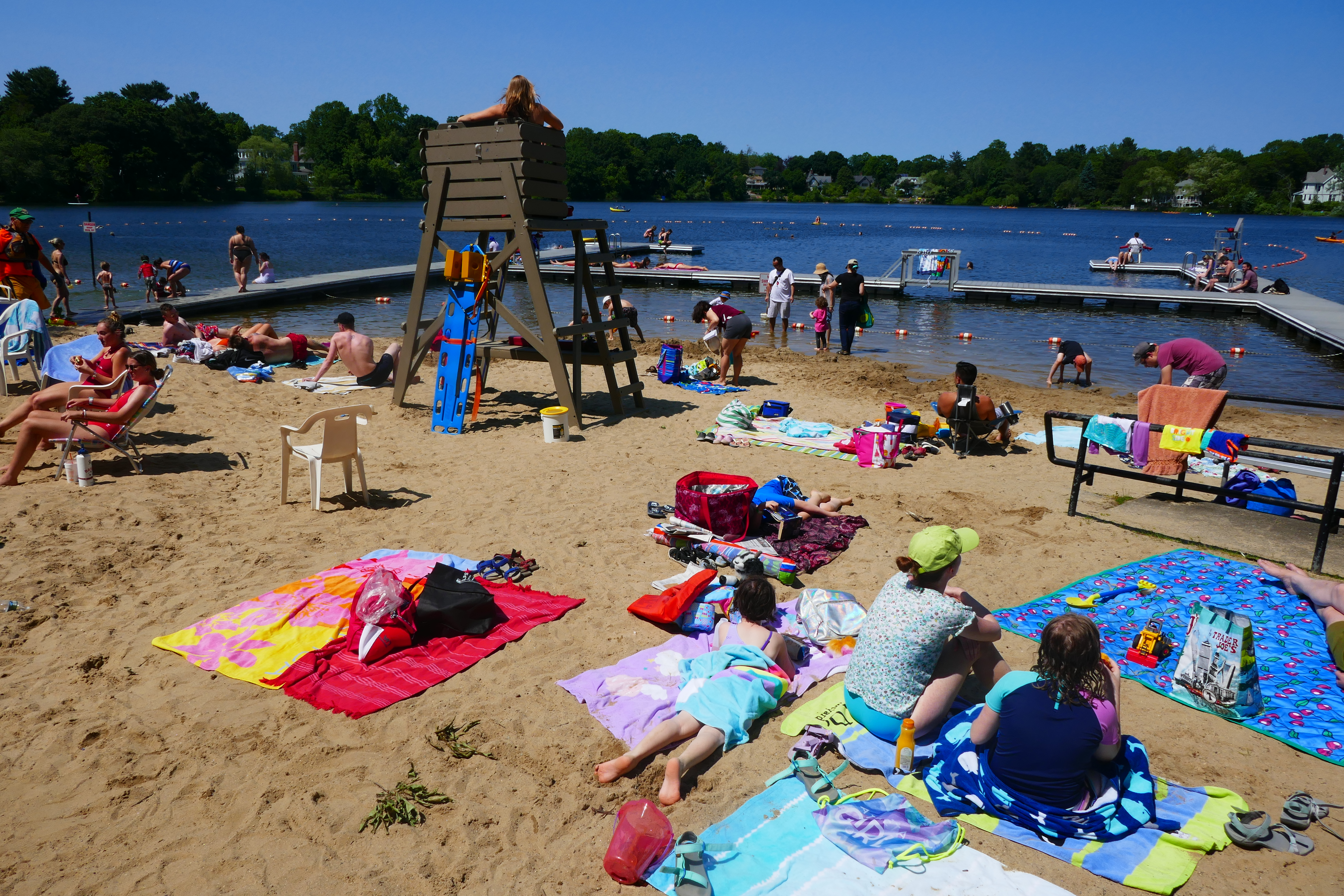
Swimming beach

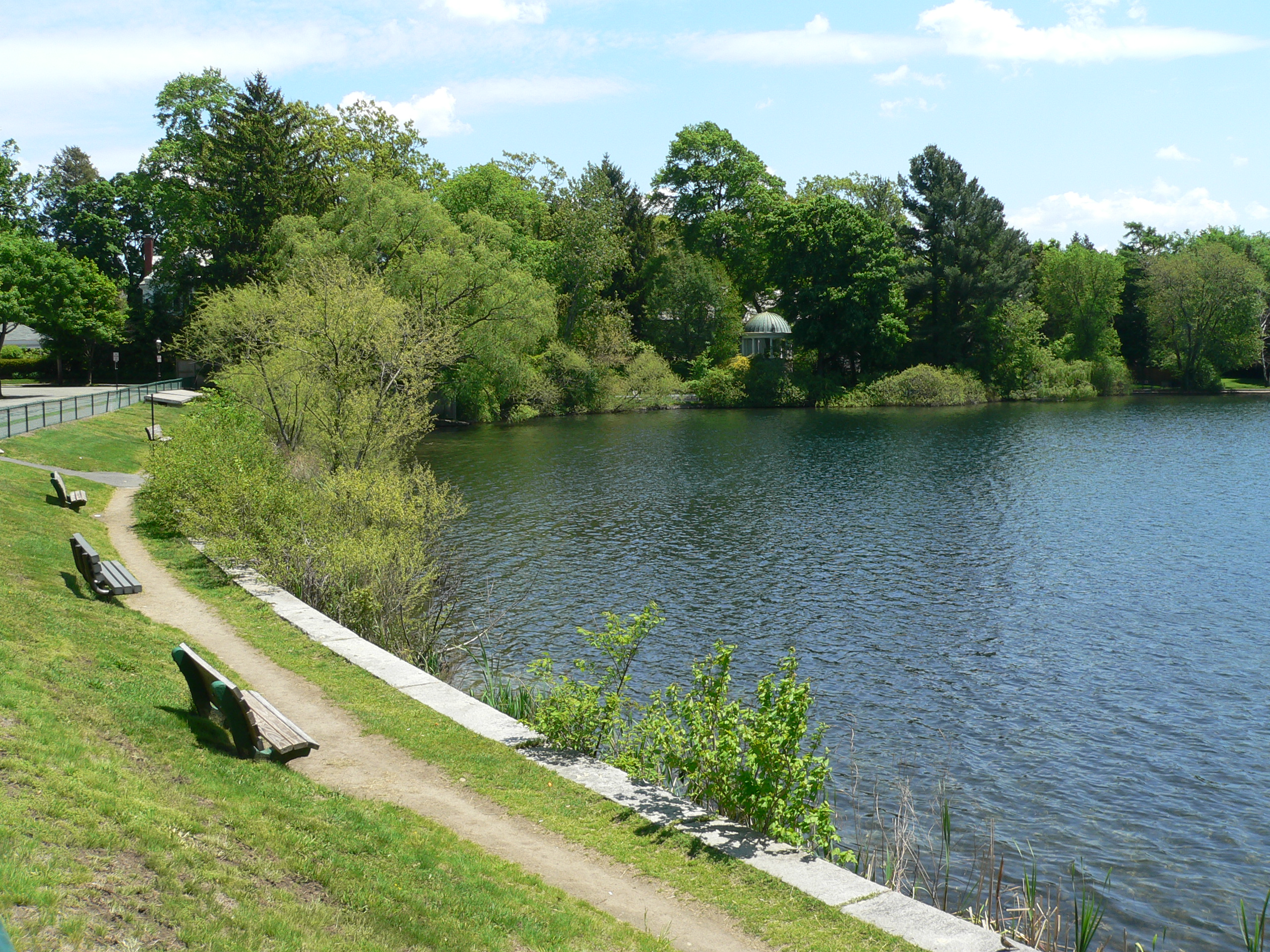
Cronin's Cove park

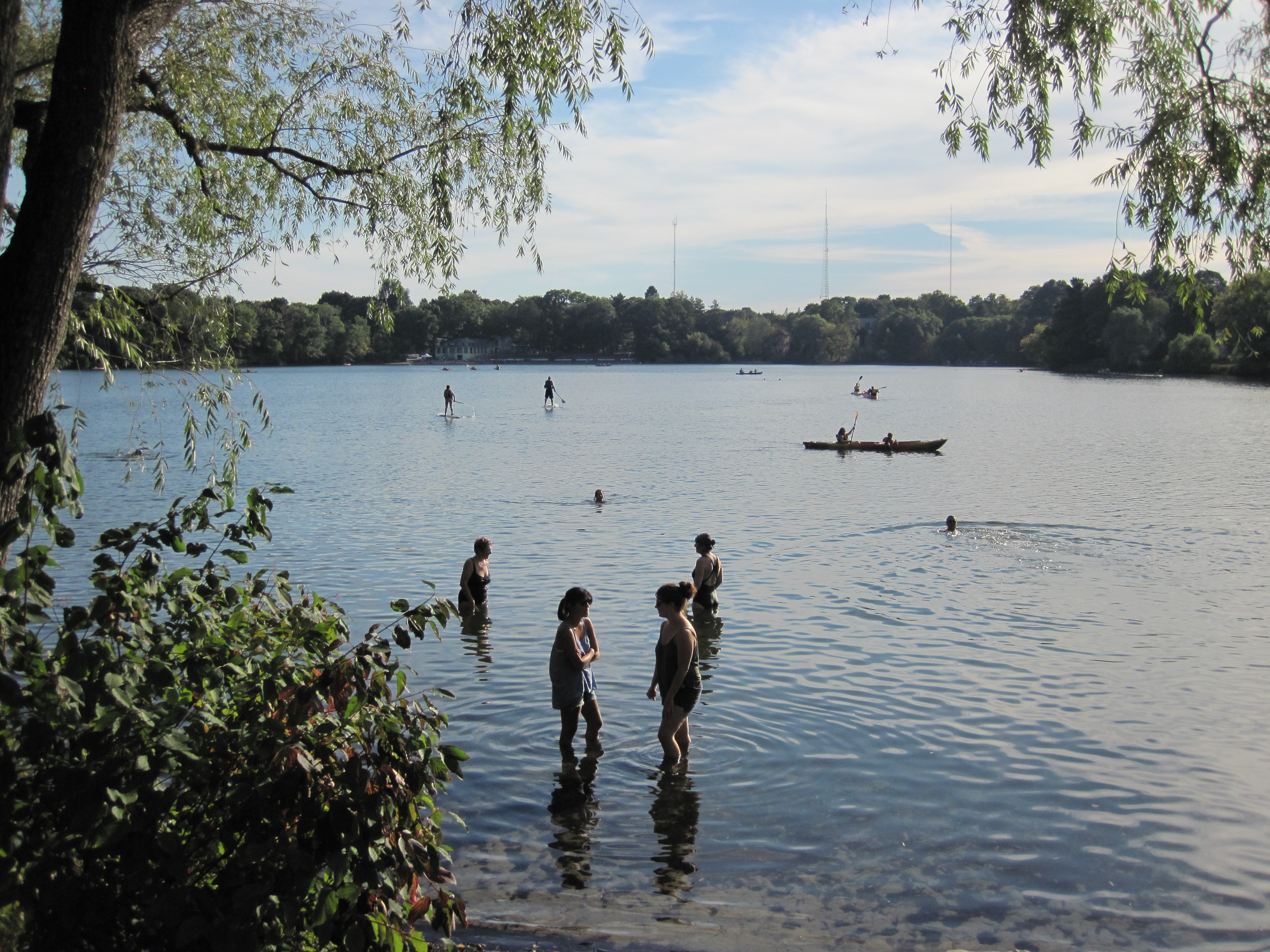
The unofficial swimming area at Cronin's Cove

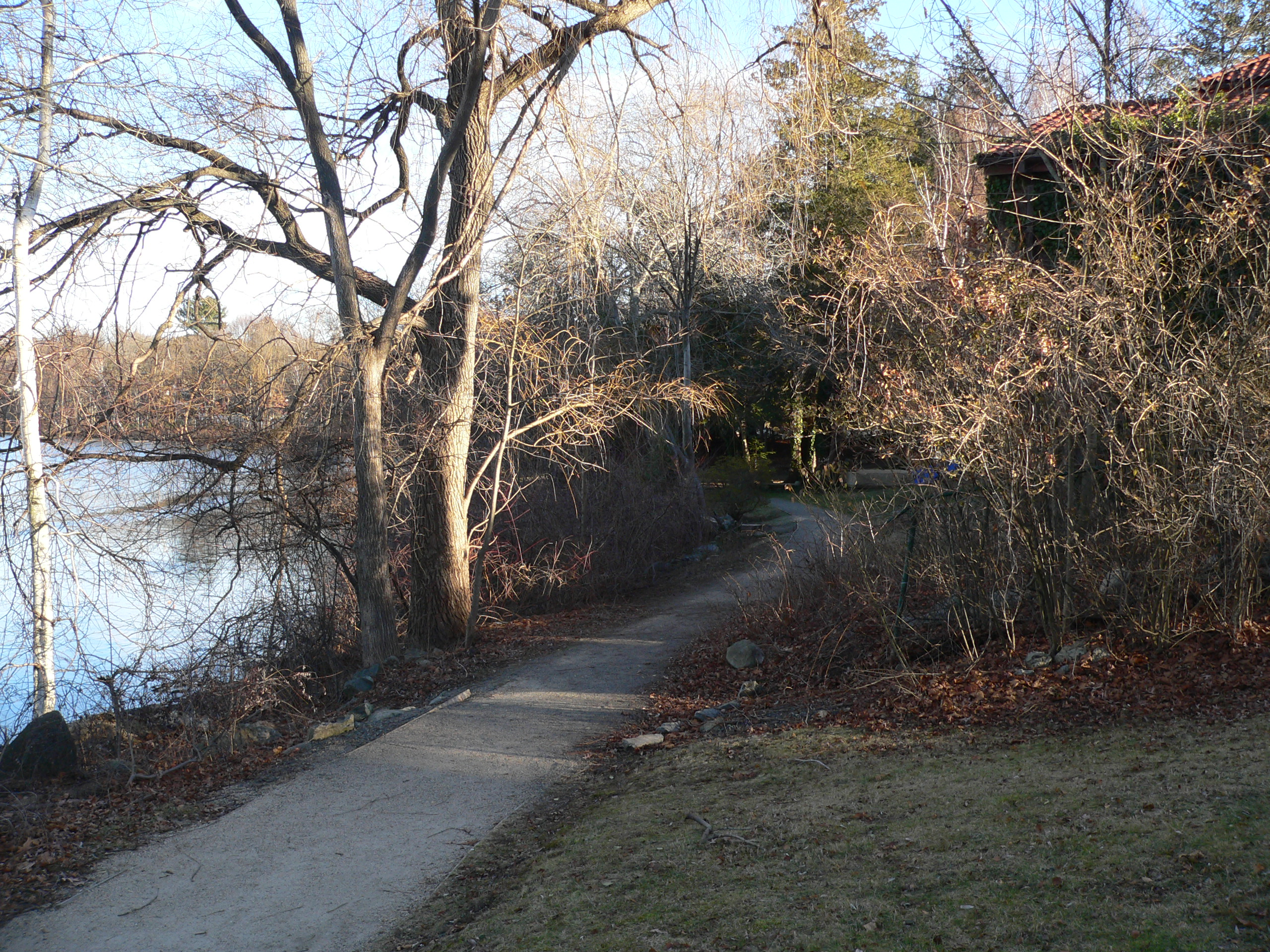
Lakeshore path through the easement acquired in 2008

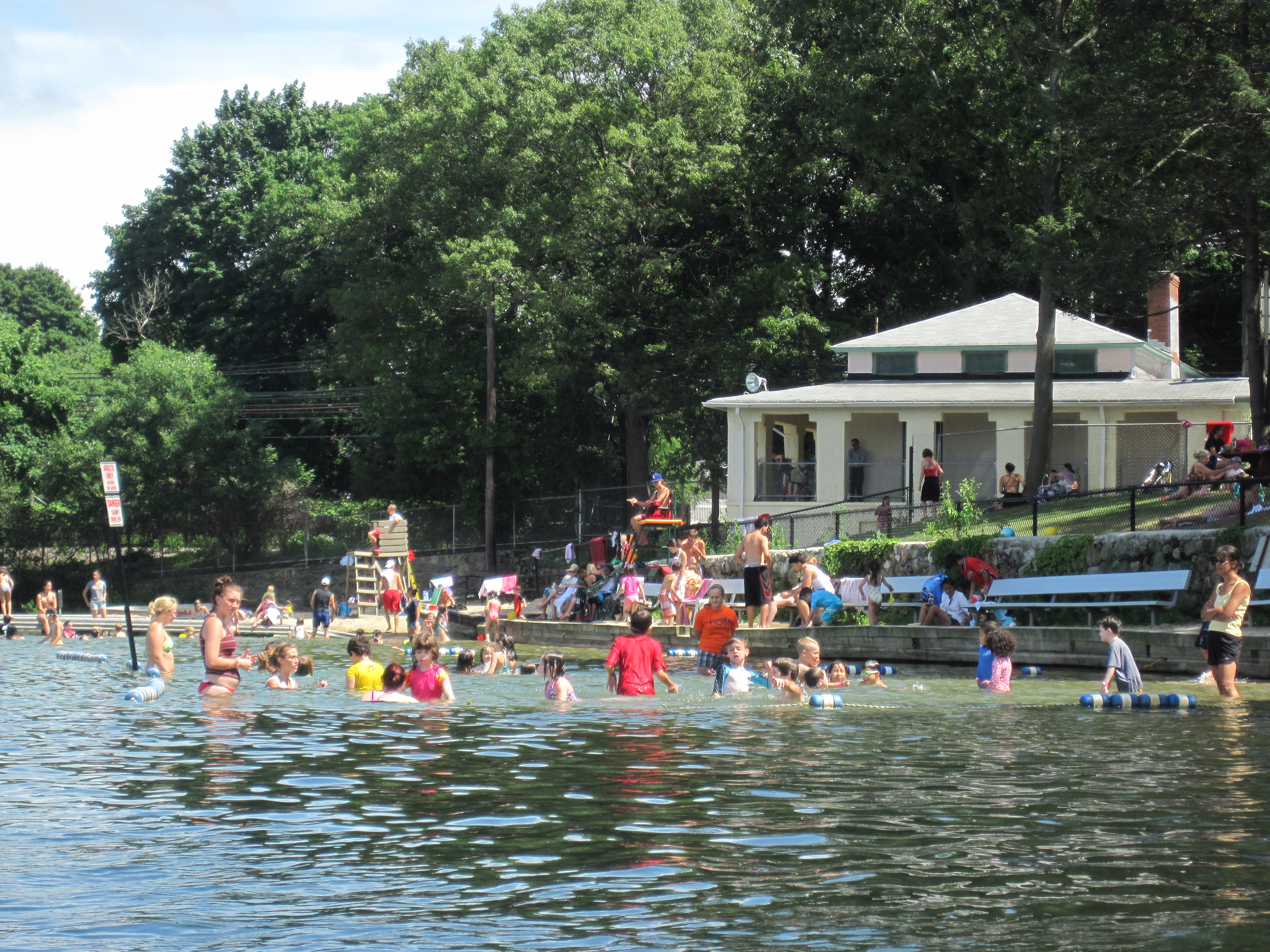
Swimmers and the bath house
