= South Burying Ground =

Historic cemetery in Massachusetts, United States

- U.S. National Register of Historic Places
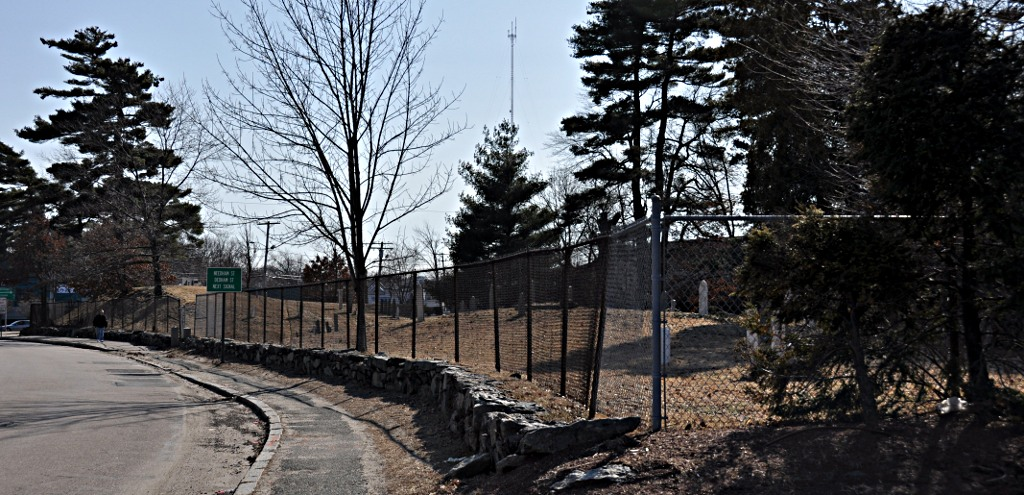

- Location within Massachusetts Location within the United States
- Location: Winchester Street, Newton Highlands, Massachusetts
- Coordinates: 42°19′4″N 71°12′35″W
- Area: 1.37 acres (0.55 ha)
- NRHP reference No.: 04001256
- Added to NRHP: December 27, 2004

The South Burying Ground, also known as Winchester Street Cemetery, or Evergreen Cemetery, is an historic cemetery located on Winchester Street in the village of Newton Highlands, in the city of Newton, Massachusetts. Established in 1802, it is Newton's third cemetery. It has 357 recorded burials, dating between 1803 and 1938. The cemetery was listed on the National Register of Historic Places in 2004.

== Description and history ==
The South Burying Ground occupies a roughly rectangular 1.37 acres (0.55 ha) on the west side of Winchester Street, a short way south of Massachusetts Route 9 in Newton Highlands. The cemetery's primary topographical features are two knolls, which flank the main entrance. The street-facing front and parts of the sides of the cemetery are lined by a stone wall that is probably of 19th century origin. A chain link fence is mounted on the wall, and encircles the rest of the property. The main entrance is secured by a chain-link gate. The cemetery has no paved lanes, although early 20th century maps show a rectilinear grid of them.

The cemetery was established as a private cemetery by local citizens in 1802, and was the first that was not associated with a parish. It has 357 recorded burials, among them eleven veterans of the American Revolutionary War and two from the American Civil War. The property was transferred to the city which continues to own and maintain it. Use of the cemetery declined after the large Newton Cemetery opened in 1855, and the last interment here was in 1938. The cemetery is normally locked and not open to public access.

== See also ==
- National Register of Historic Places listings in Newton, Massachusetts
