= Shaarei Tefillah =

Modern Orthodox synagogue in Newton, Massachusetts

- Hebrew: שַׁעֲרֵי תְפִלָה, lit. 'Gates of Prayer'
- Location in Massachusetts

Religion
- Affiliation: Modern Orthodox Judaism
- Ecclesiastical or organizational status: Synagogue
- Leadership: Rabbi Benjamin J. Samuels
- Status: Active

Location
- Location: 35 Morseland Avenue, Newton, Massachusetts 02459
- Country: United States
- Interactive map of Shaarei Tefillah
- Coordinates: 42°20′22″N 71°11′51″W

Architecture
- Established: 1983 (as a congregation)
- Completed: 1987

Specifications
- Capacity: 300 worshippers
- Height (max): 20.2 feet (6.2 m)

Website
- shaarei.org

Shaarei Tefillah (Hebrew: שַׁעֲרֵי תְפִלָה, lit. 'Gates of Prayer'), officially Congregation Shaarei Tefillah, is a Modern Orthodox synagogue located at 35 Morseland Avenue in the village of Newton Centre in Newton, Massachusetts, in the United States. In 2003, the synagogue had a membership of 140 families, and in 2012 that number had risen to 220 families. The congregation is notable for the unusual concentration of distinguished scholars among its members.

== History ==
Shaarei Tefillah was founded in December 1983 by dissident members of Newton's other major Orthodox synagogue, Congregation Beth-El Atereth Israel. Members describe the split as "generational"; Shaarei Tefillah members were younger, but more traditional and knowledgeable than those at Beth El. Members share the duty of leading services throughout the year.

The synagogue initially met in the living rooms of the homes of its members, and in a church gymnasium. In 1985, the congregation proposed locating the synagogue in a private house at 841 Commonwealth Avenue. They bought the property in 1984 for $165,000 and sought a zoning variance that would allow them to open a synagogue there in spite of there not being adequate parking. The synagogue sold the property a year later after failing to work out an arrangement.

The synagogue has been located since 1987 at 35 Morseland Avenue, one block north of Commonwealth Avenue and around the corner from Beth El. It purchased the house that year from a rabbi who had been operating a small synagogue in its basement since 1970.

The interior walls of the house were removed and a five-foot high wall constructed down the middle to create separate spaces for men and women. The ark is on the men's side, but both it and the bimah are easily seen from the women's side. As of 2009, the synagogue had 300 seats, and was seeking to expand to 405 seats.

== Services ==
Shacharit, Mincha, and Maariv services are held on weekday mornings and evenings, as well as Shabbat mornings, afternoons, evenings, and Jewish holidays. Friday evening services are attended primarily by men. The synagogue's two gabbaim welcome unfamiliar guests, and seek people to lead the services.

Its members are known for being highly educated, with people joking that "if you don't have three degrees, they won't let you in". The Jewish Orthodox Feminist Alliance (JOFA) honors on its Wall of Honor, for being women Presidents of Orthodox synagogues, the following past presidents of Shaarei Tefillah: Brenda Katz (1992–94), Lisa Micley (1999–2001), and Nancy Kolodny, former Dean of Wellesley College (2001–03).

== Clergy and leadership ==
The congregation is led by Rabbi Benjamin J. Samuels, who was hired in September 1995 as its first full-time rabbi. It has lay officers, and a board of approximately 15 people. In 1985, Dr. Alan Rockoff was the synagogue's president. Richard Feczko was its president from July 2003 to July 2006.
