= Newton, Massachusetts =

City in Massachusetts, United States

- City
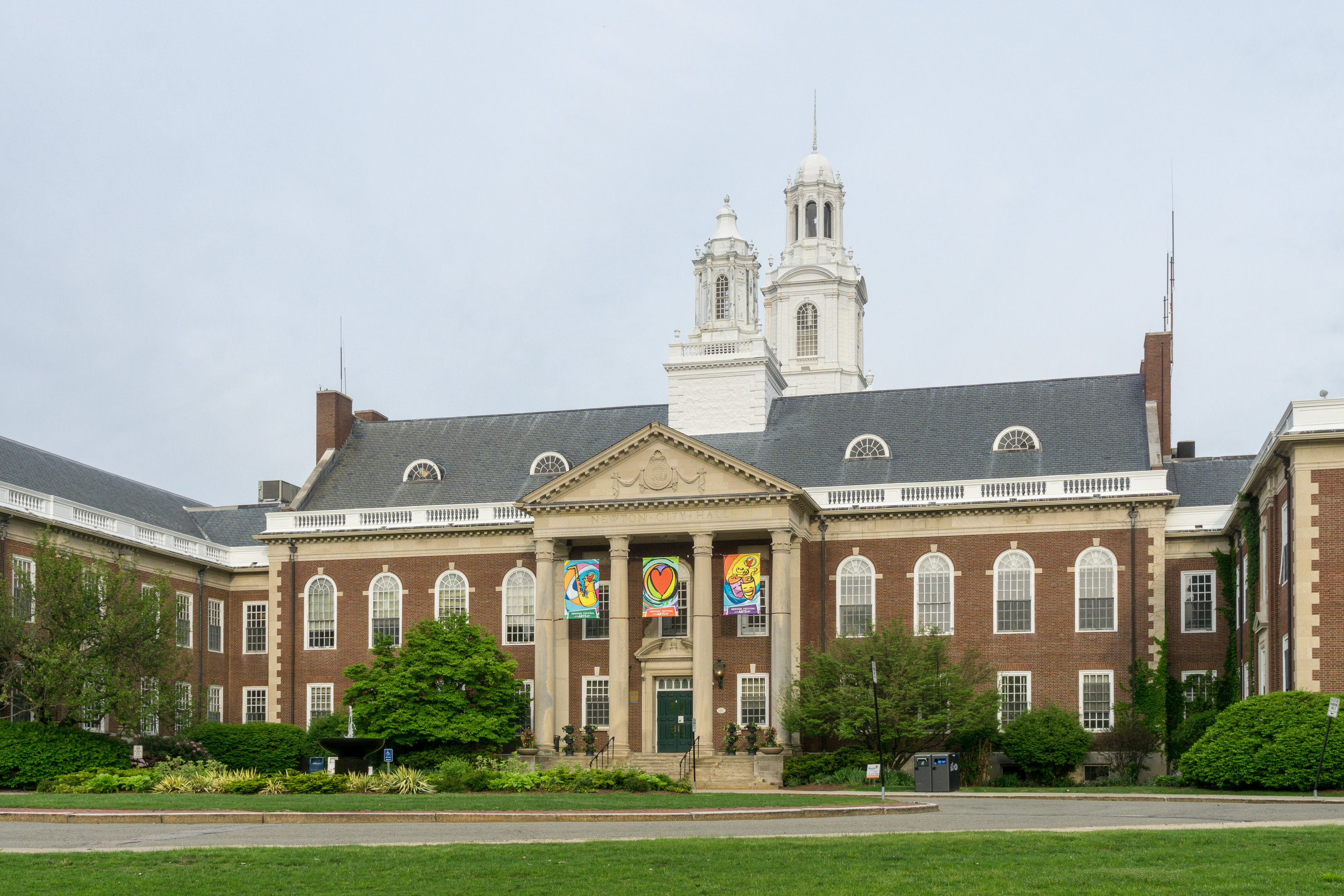
- Newton City Hall and War Memorial

- Flag Seal
- Nickname: "The Garden City"
- Motto: "Liberty and Union"
- Location in Middlesex County, Massachusetts

- Location in the United States Newton (the United States) Newton (North America)
- Coordinates: 42°20′13″N 71°12′35″W
- Country: United States
- State: Massachusetts
- County: Middlesex
- Settled: 1630
- Incorporated (Town): 1681
- Incorporated (City): 1874

Government
  - Type: Mayor–council
  - Mayor: Marc Laredo

Area
  - Total: 18.16 sq mi (47.03 km^{2})
  - Land: 17.83 sq mi (46.17 km^{2})
  - Water: 0.33 sq mi (0.86 km^{2})
- Elevation: 98 ft (30 m)

Population (2020)
  - Total: 88,923
  - Density: 4,987.9/sq mi (1,925.84/km^{2})
- Time zone: UTC−5 (Eastern)
  - Summer (DST): UTC−4 (Eastern)
- ZIP Codes: 02458 (Newton); 02459 (Newton Center); 02460 (Newtonville); 02461 (Newton Highlands); 02462 (Newton Lower Falls); 02464 (Newton Upper Falls); 02465 (West Newton); 02466 (Auburndale); 02467 (Chestnut Hill); 02468 (Waban); 02495 (Nonantum)
- Area code: 617/857
- FIPS code: 25-45560
- GNIS feature ID: 0617675
- Website: www.newtonma.gov

Newton is a city in Middlesex County, Massachusetts, United States. It is located roughly 8 miles (13 km) west of Downtown Boston, and comprises a patchwork of thirteen villages. The city borders Boston to the northeast and southeast (via the neighborhoods of Brighton and West Roxbury), Brookline to the east, Watertown and Waltham to the north, and Weston, Wellesley, and Needham to the west. According to the U.S. Census Bureau's 2025 estimates, the population of Newton, Massachusetts was 90,741.

Newton is home to the Charles River, Crystal Lake, and Heartbreak Hill, among other landmarks. It is served by several streets and highways (including Route 9, Hammond Pond Parkway, and the Mass Pike), as well as the Green Line D branch run by the MBTA.

Historically, the area that is now Newton was settled in 1639, and was originally first part of Cambridge (then called "the newe towne"). It split from Cambridge in 1681, and became known by its present name of Newton in 1766. It then became a city in 1874.

== History ==
=== 17th century ===
Newton was originally part of "the newe towne", which was settled in 1630 and renamed Cambridge in 1638. The first English settlement of what is now Newton began in 1639. Roxbury minister John Eliot persuaded the Native American people of Nonantum, a sub-tribe of the Massachusett led by a sachem named Waban, to relocate to Natick in 1651, fearing that they would be exploited by colonists. Newton was incorporated as a separate town, known as Cambridge Village, on December 15, 1681, then renamed Newtown in 1691, and finally Newton in 1766. It became a city on January 5, 1874. Newton is known as The Garden City.

In the early 1600s, Watertown had claimed a large area of land on the south side of the Charles River (modern-day Newton). They gave it up to Newtown, except for a strip "two hundred rods long and sixty rods wide" to "protect their fishing privileges".

=== 18th century ===
In Reflections in Bullough's Pond, Newton historian Diana Muir describes the early industries that developed in the late 18th and early 19th centuries in a series of mills built to take advantage of the water power available at Newton Upper Falls and Newton Lower Falls. Snuff, chocolate, glue, paper and other products were produced in these small mills but, according to Muir, the water power available in Newton was not sufficient to turn Newton into a manufacturing city, although it was, beginning in 1902, the home of the Stanley Motor Carriage Company, the maker of the Stanley Steamer.

=== 19th century ===
Nineteenth-century Newton, following the American Civil War, was a patchwork of villages. The northern villages of Auburndale, Newton Corner, Newtonville, and West Newton were the most affluent. In contrast, both Waban and Chestnut Hill were sparsely populated.

Several village-based "improvement societies" were founded by residents between 1878 and 1904. No citywide improvement society was ever founded.

In 1889, Moses King published King's Handbook of Newton, a descriptive guide to all of Newton's significant locations and historic structures along with anecdotes and stories from the locals at the time. The information was collected by its author and close associate of King, Moses Forster Sweetser.

Newton, according to Muir, became one of North America's earliest commuter suburbs. The Boston and Worcester, one of North America's earliest railroads, reached West Newton in 1834. Wealthy Bostonian businessmen took advantage of the new commuting opportunity offered by the railroad, building gracious homes on erstwhile farmland of West Newton hill and on Commonwealth Avenue. Muir points out that these early commuters needed sufficient wealth to employ a groom and keep horses, to drive them from their hilltop homes to the station.

=== 20th century ===
Further suburbanization came in waves. One wave began with the streetcar lines that made many parts of Newton accessible for commuters in the late nineteenth century. The next wave came in the 1920s when automobiles became affordable to a growing upper middle class. Even then, however, Oak Hill continued to be farmed, mostly market gardening, until the prosperity of the 1950s made all of Newton more densely settled.

=== 21st century ===
Two of the hijackers of the September 11 attacks stayed in Newton the night before the attacks. The hijackers of American Airlines Flight 11 spent their last night in Newton's Park Inn, an economy motel across the street from the Chestnut Hill Mall and within walking distance of The Atrium.

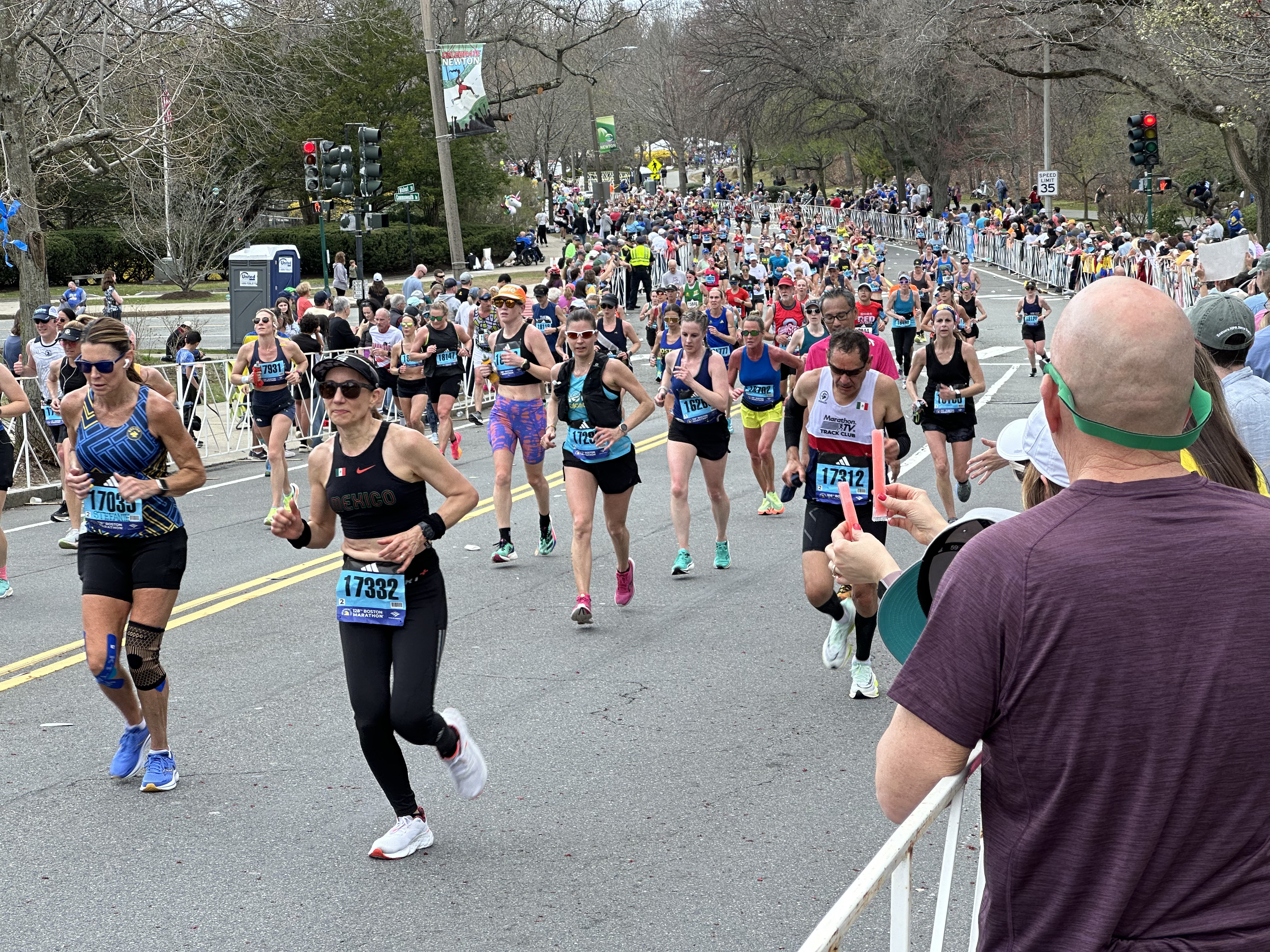
Runners in the 2024 Boston Marathon pass through the intersection of Commonwealth Avenue and Walnut Street in Newton, with fans packed behind metal barriers.

Each April on Patriots' Day, the Boston Marathon is run through the city, entering from Wellesley on Route 16 (Washington Street) where runners encounter the first of the four infamous Newton Hills. It then turns right onto Route 30 (Commonwealth Avenue) for the long haul into Boston. There are two more hills before reaching Centre Street, and then the fourth and most noted, Heartbreak Hill, rises shortly after Centre Street. Residents and visitors line the race route along Washington Street and Commonwealth Avenue to cheer on the runners.

== Geography ==
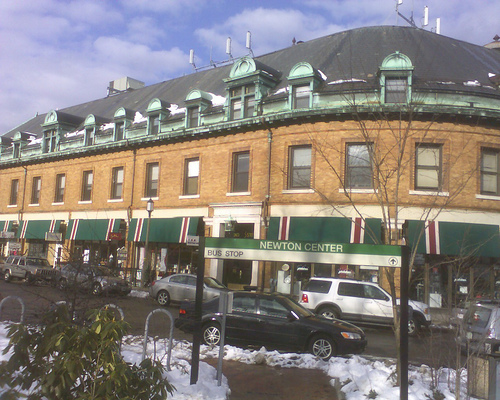
Newton Centre's Union Street in 2007

Newton is a suburban city approximately 7 mi (11 km) from downtown Boston, in Middlesex County. It is also bordered by Waltham and Watertown on the north, Needham and the West Roxbury neighborhood of Boston on the south, Wellesley and Weston on the west, and Brookline and the Brighton neighborhood of Boston on the east.

The Charles River flows along the north and west parts of Newton, and Route 128 passes through the western part of the city.

The Mass Pike passes through the more urbanized northern section of the city before heading into Boston. Additional major highways in Newton include Route 9, serving the southern parts of the city, and Hammond Pond Parkway, which is the main north–south route through Chestnut Hill and provides access to Brookline and West Roxbury.

According to the United States Census Bureau, the city has a total area of 18.2 square miles (47.1 km^{2}), of which 18.0 square miles (46.6 km^{2}) is land and 0.2 square miles (0.5 km^{2}) (0.82%) is water.

=== Geological history ===
Geologically Newton is located within the topographic lowland of the Boston Basin of the Appalachian Mountain chain. This lowland is surrounded by a ring of highland drumlins which were left after the last glaciation twelve thousand years ago.

There are several unique outcroppings of rocks around Newton where geologic history revealing of how territory have formed and has changed over the past hundreds millions of years of drift supercontinents and ancient oceans, earthquake activity associated with volcanism and related faulting activity and changing climate. There are mainly three types of bedrock: Roxbury Conglomerate, Cambridge Argillite or Slate, and Brighton Volcanics and the Mattapan Volcanics pre-Cambrian foundation of Dedham Granodiorite. The Boston Border Fault and the Shawmut anticline of Newton formed as the alpine mountains of east-central Massachusetts were created. Unique outcroppings rocks exposure has steadily declined as Newton area has become increasingly developed.

=== Topography ===
Newton has grown around a formation of seven hills. "The general features of Newton are not without interest. Seven principal elevations mark its surface, like the seven hills of ancient Rome, with the difference that the seven hills of Newton are much more distinct than the seven hills of Rome: Nonantum Hill, Waban Hill, Chestnut Hill, Bald Pate Hill, Oak Hill, Institution Hill and Mount Ida."

=== Villages ===
Rather than having a single city center, Newton is a patchwork of thirteen villages, many boasting small downtown areas of their own. The 13 villages are: Auburndale, Chestnut Hill, Newton Centre, Newton Corner, Newton Highlands, Newton Lower Falls, Newton Upper Falls (both on the Charles River, and both former small industrial sites), Newtonville, Nonantum (also known as Silver Lake or "The Lake"), Oak Hill, Thompsonville, Waban and West Newton. Oak Hill Park is a place within the village of Oak Hill that itself is shown as a separate and distinct village on some city maps (including a map dated 2010 on the official City of Newton website), and Four Corners is also shown as a village on some city maps. Although most of the villages have a post office, they have no legal definition and no firmly defined borders. This village-based system often causes some confusion with addresses and for first-time visitors.

=== Climate ===
The record low temperature was −21 °F (−29 °C) in February 1934; the record high temperature was 101 °F (38 °C) in August 1975.

Climate data for Newton, Massachusetts
Month	Jan	Feb	Mar	Apr	May	Jun	Jul	Aug	Sep	Oct	Nov	Dec	Year
Record high °F (°C)	68 (20)	68 (20)	89 (32)	94 (34)	93 (34)	99 (37)	100 (38)	101 (38)	99 (37)	88 (31)	81 (27)	74 (23)	101 (38)
Mean daily maximum °F (°C)	34 (1)	37 (3)	44 (7)	56 (13)	66 (19)	76 (24)	82 (28)	79 (26)	72 (22)	60 (16)	50 (10)	39 (4)	58 (14)
Mean daily minimum °F (°C)	17 (−8)	19 (−7)	27 (−3)	38 (3)	48 (9)	57 (14)	63 (17)	62 (17)	55 (13)	43 (6)	34 (1)	24 (−4)	41 (5)
Record low °F (°C)	−14 (−26)	−21 (−29)	−5 (−21)	6 (−14)	27 (−3)	36 (2)	44 (7)	39 (4)	28 (−2)	20 (−7)	5 (−15)	−19 (−28)	−21 (−29)
Average precipitation inches (mm)	4.35 (110)	4.24 (108)	5.58 (142)	4.55 (116)	4.11 (104)	4.31 (109)	4.02 (102)	4.03 (102)	4.06 (103)	4.69 (119)	4.76 (121)	4.89 (124)	53.59 (1,360)

== Demographics ==
Historical population
Year	Pop.	±%
1790	1,360	—
1800	1,491	+9.6%
1810	1,709	+14.6%
1820	1,850	+8.3%
1830	2,376	+28.4%
1840	3,351	+41.0%
1850	5,258	+56.9%
1860	8,382	+59.4%
1870	12,825	+53.0%
1880	16,995	+32.5%
1890	24,379	+43.4%
1900	33,587	+37.8%
1910	39,806	+18.5%
1920	46,054	+15.7%
1930	65,276	+41.7%
1940	69,873	+7.0%
1950	81,994	+17.3%
1960	92,384	+12.7%
1970	91,263	−1.2%
1980	83,622	−8.4%
1990	82,585	−1.2%
2000	83,829	+1.5%
2010	85,146	+1.6%
2020	88,923	+4.4%
2024*	90,700	+2.0%
* = population estimate. Source: United States census records and Population Estimates Program data. Source: U.S. Decennial Census

=== Racial and ethnic composition ===
Newton, Massachusetts – Racial and ethnic composition Note: the US Census treats Hispanic/Latino as an ethnic category. This table excludes Latinos from the racial categories and assigns them to a separate category. Hispanics/Latinos may be of any race.
Race / Ethnicity (NH = Non-Hispanic)	Pop 2000	Pop 2010	Pop 2020	% 2000	% 2010	% 2020
White alone (NH)	72,388	67,801	62,303	86.35%	79.63%	70.06%
Black or African American alone (NH)	1,584	2,008	2,554	1.89%	2.36%	2.87%
Native American or Alaska Native alone (NH)	43	56	49	0.05%	0.07%	0.06%
Asian alone (NH)	6,415	9,759	14,681	7.65%	11.46%	16.51%
Pacific Islander alone (NH)	18	18	25	0.02%	0.02%	0.03%
Some Other Race alone (NH)	213	294	765	0.25%	0.35%	0.86%
Mixed Race or Multi-Racial (NH)	1,057	1,734	4,053	1.26%	2.04%	4.56%
Hispanic or Latino (any race)	2,111	3,476	4,493	2.52%	4.08%	5.05%
Total	83,829	85,146	88,923	100.00%	100.00%	100.00%

=== 2020 census ===
As of the 2020 census, Newton had a population of 88,923. The median age was 41.7 years. 21.1% of residents were under the age of 18 and 19.5% of residents were 65 years of age or older. For every 100 females there were 90.9 males, and for every 100 females age 18 and over there were 87.7 males age 18 and over.

100.0% of residents lived in urban areas, while 0.0% lived in rural areas.

There were 31,704 households in Newton, of which 33.3% had children under the age of 18 living in them. Of all households, 58.7% were married-couple households, 12.5% were households with a male householder and no spouse or partner present, and 24.7% were households with a female householder and no spouse or partner present. About 23.6% of all households were made up of individuals and 12.6% had someone living alone who was 65 years of age or older.

There were 33,320 housing units, of which 4.8% were vacant. The homeowner vacancy rate was 0.8% and the rental vacancy rate was 5.1%.

Racial composition as of the 2020 census
Race	Number	Percent
White	63,226	71.1%
Black or African American	2,670	3.0%
American Indian and Alaska Native	137	0.2%
Asian	14,725	16.6%
Native Hawaiian and Other Pacific Islander	28	0.0%
Some other race	1,984	2.2%
Two or more races	6,153	6.9%
Hispanic or Latino (of any race)	4,493	5.1%

=== 2010 census ===
As of the census of 2010, there were 85,146 people, 32,648 households, and 20,499 families residing in the city. The population density was 4,643.6 inhabitants per square mile (1,792.9/km^{2}). There were 32,112 housing units at an average density of 1,778.8 per square mile (686.8/km^{2}). The racial makeup of the city was 79.6% White, 11.5% Asian, 2.5% African American, 0.07% Native American, 0.03% Pacific Islander, 0.71% from other races, and 1.46% from two or more races. Hispanic or Latino residents of any race were 4.1% of the population (0.7% Puerto Rican, 0.6% Mexican, 0.4% Colombian, 0.3% Guatemalan, 0.3% Argentine). (2010 Census Report: Census report Quickfacts.com)

=== Other demographics ===
Newton, along with neighboring Brookline, is known for its significant Jewish and Asian (practicing Christian or other) populations. The Jewish population as of 2002 was estimated to be 28,002.

There were 31,201 households, out of which 31.1% had children under the age of 18 living with them, 55.2% were married couples living together, 8.0% had a female householder with no husband present, and 34.3% were non-families. Of all households, 25.5% were made up of individuals, and 11.1% had someone living alone who was 65 years of age or older. As of the 2008 US Census, the average household size was 2.60 and the average family size was 3.11.

In the city, 21.2% of the population was under the age of 18, 10.3% was from 18 to 24, 28.2% from 25 to 44, 25.2% from 45 to 64, and 15.1% was 65 years of age or older. The median age was 39 years. For every 100 females, there were 86.8 males. For every 100 females age 18 and over, there were 82.7 males.

The median income for a household in the city was $107,696, and the median income for a family was $136,843. Males had a median income of $95,387 versus $60,520 for females. The per capita income for the city was $56,163. About 3.6% of families and 5.9% of the population were below the poverty line, including 5.2% of those under age 18 and 9.4% of those age 65 or over.

As of 2015, 21.9% of the residents of Newton had been born outside of the United States.

== Economy ==
Newton's largest employers include Boston College and Newton-Wellesley Hospital. Companies based in Newton include TechTarget, CyberArk, Upromise and Kanda Software.

=== Income ===
Data is from the 2009–2013 American Community Survey 5-Year Estimates.

Rank	ZIP code (ZCTA)	Per capita income	Median household income	Median family income	Population	Number of households
1	02468	$86,528	$201,731	$213,958	5,267	1,868
2	02465	$75,857	$139,763	$163,898	11,673	4,251
3	02462	$74,279	$83,438	$211,779	1,412	682
4	02459	$71,128	$133,801	$173,613	18,339	6,694
	Newton	$63,872	$119,148	$154,787	86,241	31,295
5	02460	$61,686	$102,276	$139,917	9,046	3,625
6	02461	$61,088	$122,283	$146,343	6,808	2,526
7	02458	$59,071	$95,216	$132,207	11,602	4,791
8	02467	$55,288	$115,493	$151,495	23,092	6,575
9	02464	$51,744	$81,771	$83,816	2,947	1,337
10	02466	$47,551	$105,893	$131,705	9,105	3,098
	Middlesex County	$42,861	$82,090	$104,032	1,522,533	581,120
	Massachusetts	$35,763	$66,866	$84,900	6,605,058	2,530,147
	United States	$28,155	$53,046	$64,719	311,536,594	115,610,216

== Arts and culture ==
The city is home to two symphony orchestras, the New Philharmonia Orchestra of Massachusetts and the Newton Symphony Orchestra. The Joanne Langione Dance Center, an American youth dance school was founded in 1976.

=== Points of interest ===
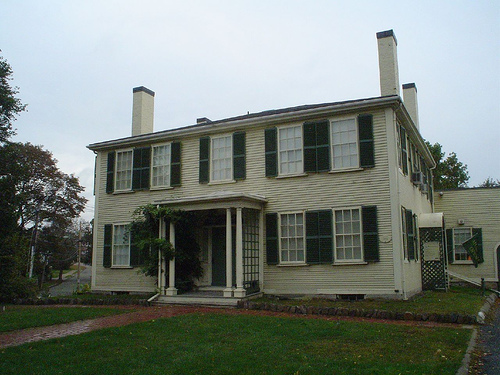
The Jackson Homestead.

- Crystal Lake is a 33-acre (13 ha) natural lake located in Newton Centre. Its shores, mostly lined with private homes, also host two small parks, a designated swimming area, and a bathhouse. Previously known as Wiswall's Pond, it became known as Crystal Lake sometime between 1855 and 1875. The name was given by a nineteenth-century commercial ice harvester that sold ice cut from the pond in winter.
- The Jackson Homestead, now the Newton History Museum at the Jackson Homestead, is best known for its history as a stop on the Underground Railroad. It was built in 1809 as a farmhouse designed in the Federal style, and is now a museum with paintings, costumes, photographs, manuscripts, maps and historical artifacts.
- Heartbreak Hill, notably challenging stretch of the Boston Marathon, on Commonwealth Avenue between Walnut Street and Boston College.
- Newton is home to many exclusive golf courses such as Woodland Country Club, Charles River Country Club, and Brae Burn Country Club, which held the United States Open in 1919.
- City Stable and Garage, historic building
- The John A. Fenno House is a historic house at 171 Lowell Avenue, built c. 1854, and a rare local example of Gothic Revival styling.
- The House at 173–175 Ward Street is one of the city's few Federal style houses, built c. 1800
- Echo Bridge is a notable 19th-century masonry arch bridge with views of the river and Hemlock Gorge in Hemlock Gorge Reservation just off Route 9 in Newton Upper Falls.
- Norumbega Park was located in Auburndale on the Charles River. Opening in 1897 as a trolley park, it was a popular amusement park through the 1950s before closing in 1963. Its Totem Pole Ballroom became a well-known dancing and entertainment venue for big bands touring during the 1940s as well as other famous performers such as Doris Day, Bing Crosby, Eydie Gorme and The Four Lads. The park is now a popular dog-walking site with hills, meadows, woods, and access to the river.

Chestnut Hill Reservoir

- Auburndale Cove is a multipurpose picnic and recreational area on the Charles River just down the walking path from Norumbega Park.
- Chestnut Hill Reservoir is a very popular park with residents of Newton, Brookline, and the Brighton section of Boston. Although completely within the Boston city limits, it is directly contiguous to the Newton city limits. Designed by Frederick Law Olmsted, the designer of Central Park in New York City and the Emerald Necklace in Boston, the park offers beautiful views of the Boston skyline, and is framed by stately homes and the campus of Boston College. Although not generally used to supply water to Boston, the reservoir was temporarily brought back online on May 1, 2010, during a failure of a connecting pipe at the end of the MetroWest Water Supply Tunnel.
- Bullough's Pond is an old mill pond transformed into a landscape feature when Newton became a suburban community in the late nineteenth century. It has been the subject of two books, Reflections in Bullough's Pond: Economy and Ecosystem in New England, by Diana Muir, and Once Around Bullough's Pond: A Native American Epic, by Douglas Worth. It was long maintained by the city as an ice skating venue, but skating is no longer allowed. A scene from the 2008 remake of The Women was filmed there.
- The city of Newton has designated several roads in the city as "scenic". Along with this designation come regulations aimed at curbing tree removal and trimming along the roads, as well as stemming the removal of historic stone walls. The city designated the following as scenic roads: Hobart Rd., Waban Ave., Sumner St., Chestnut St., Concord St., Dudley Rd., Fuller St., Hammond St., Valentine St., Lake Ave., Highland St., and Brookside Ave.
- The United Parish of Auburndale, constructed in 1857, oldest wooden church building in Newton.
- The First Baptist Church in Newton Centre, constructed in 1888, was designed by John Lyman Faxon in the Richardsonian Romanesque style pioneered by architect Henry Hobson Richardson.
- The WHDH-TV tower is one of the tallest free-standing lattice towers in the United States.
- The primary campus of Boston College, a Jesuit research university, and the campus of its law school are located in Chestnut Hill.

== Government ==
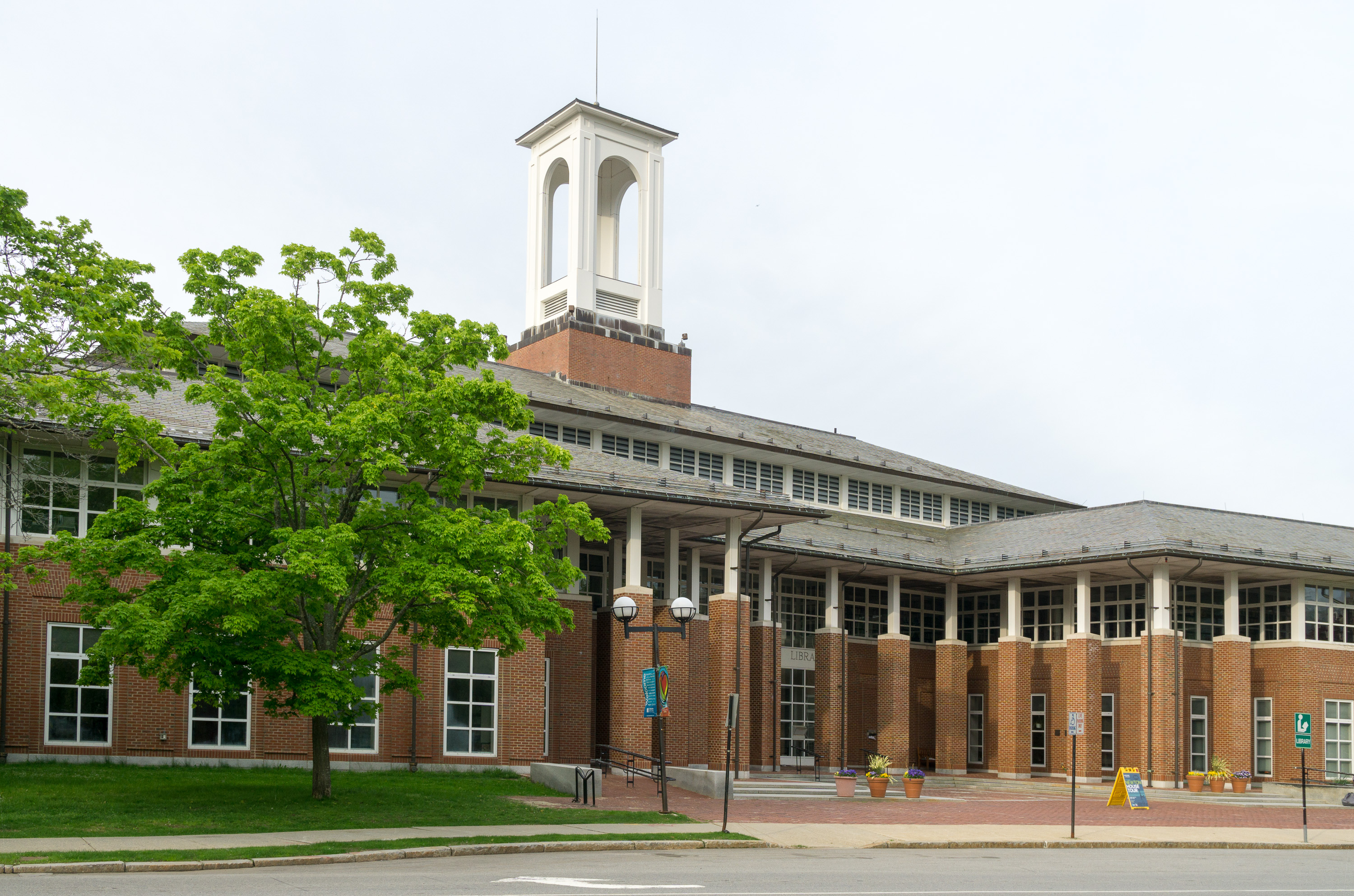
Newton Public Library

=== City ===
Newton has an elected strong mayor-council form of government. The council is called the City Council. The mayor is Marc Laredo.

The elected officials are:

- Mayor: Marc Laredo, the city's chief executive officer and appoints the Chief Administrative Officer.
- The City Council, Newton's legislative branch of municipal government, is made up of 24 members – sixteen Councilors-at-large and eight Ward Councilors. Councilors are elected every two years.

As of January 2026, the makeup of the City Council is:

Ward	Ward Councilor	At-large Councilor	At-large Councilor
1	Maria Scibelli Greenberg	Alison Leary	John Oliver
2	David Micley	Tarik J. Lucas	Susan Albright
3	Julia Malakie	Andrea W. Kelley	Pam Wright
4	Randy Block	Cyrus P. Dahmubed	Joshua Krintzman
5	Julie Irish	Brittany Hume Charm	Rena Getz
6	Martha Bixby	Sean Roche	Lisa Gordon
7	R. Lisle Baker	Rebecca Walker-Grossman	Brian Golden
8	Stephen Farrell	Jacob Silber	David Kalis

Newton's school committee decides policies and budget for Newton Public Schools. It has nine voting members, consisting of the Mayor of Newton and eight at-large Ward representatives, who are elected.

=== County ===
Mismanagement of Middlesex County's public hospital in the mid-1990s left the county on the brink of insolvency, and in 1997 the Massachusetts legislature stepped in by assuming all assets and obligations of the county. The government of Middlesex County was officially abolished on July 11, 1997. The sheriff and some other regional officials with specific duties are still elected locally to perform duties within the county region, but there is no county council or commission. However, communities are now granted the right to form their own regional compacts for sharing services.

These are the remaining elected officers for Middlesex County:

- Clerk of Courts: Michael A. Sullivan
- County Treasurer: Position eliminated
- District Attorney: Marian T. Ryan
- Register of Deeds: Maria C. Curtatone
- Register of Probate: Tara E. DeCristofaro
- County Sheriff: Peter J. Koutoujian Jr.

=== State ===
House of Representatives:

- John J. Lawn, Democrat of Watertown: Tenth Middlesex District, includes Precincts 1 and 4 of Ward 1, Newton.
- Kay Khan, Democrat of Newton: Eleventh Middlesex District, includes precincts 2 and 3 of Ward 1, All precincts in Wards 2, 3 and 4 and precinct 2 of Ward 7, Newton.
- Amy Mah Sangiolo, Democrat of Newton: Twelfth Middlesex District, includes all precincts in Wards 5 and 6, precincts 1, 3 and 4 of Ward 7; and all precincts in Ward 8, Newton.

Senate:

- Cynthia Stone Creem, Democrat of Newton: 1st Middlesex District and Norfolk, since 1998.

=== Federal ===
Congress

- House of Representatives: Massachusetts's 4th congressional district: Jake Auchincloss, Democrat
- Senate: Ed Markey, Democrat
- Senate: Elizabeth Warren, Democrat

Newton town vote by party in presidential elections
Year	Democratic	Republican
2024	78.0% 36,445	18.6% 8,699
2020	81.3% 40,907	16.6% 8,357
2016	77.6% 36,463	16.5% 7,764
2012	71.3% 32,099	27.0% 12,154
2008	75.0% 33,360	23.1% 10,283
2004	75.2% 32,061	23.5% 10,025
2000	73.0% 29,918	19.8% 8,132
1996	73.5% 30,005	20.8% 8,499
1992	65.2% 29,136	21.5% 9,623
1988	66.8% 29,039	32.0% 13,892
1984	62.7% 27,343	37.1% 16,184
1980	45.8% 20,173	35.4% 15,621
1976	55.5% 25,116	40.6% 18,372
1972	60.0% 27,470	39.7% 18,172
1968	67.8% 29,427	29.8% 12,936
1964	77.0% 34,854	22.4% 10,124
1960	51.0% 24,482	48.7% 23,421
1956	36.0% 16,650	63.9% 29,546
1952	31.8% 14,492	68.0% 31,087
1948	33.8% 13,349	64.1% 25,292
1944	35.0% 13,670	64.8% 25,268
1940	31.6% 12,101	67.7% 25,629
1936	31.1% 10,634	64.2% 21,936
1932	31.9% 9,514	66.6% 19,892
1928	36.3% 10,438	62.9% 18,074
1924	19.2% 3,836	73.8% 14,738
1920	22.6% 3,689	75.9% 12,407
1916	35.5% 2,585	63.2% 4,605
1912	31.7% 2,022	39.5% 2,515
1908	25.5% 1,470	70.4% 4,053
1904	30.7% 1,658	67.0% 3,613
1900	28.0% 1,328	69.4% 3,294
1896	11.8% 525	80.5% 3,570
1892	40.1% 1,673	58.0% 2,416
1888	39.0% 1,404	57.9% 2,086
1884	38.5% 1,158	52.9% 1,594
1880	26.4% 715	73.2% 1,985
1876	32.0% 832	68.0% 1771
1872	18.3% 285	81.7% 1,272
1868	23.7% 372	76.3% 1,200

Voter Registration and Party Enrollment as of October 17, 2018
Party	Number of Voters	Percentage
Democratic	25,517	42.30%
Republican	4,110	6.81%
Unaffiliated	30,183	50.03%
Libertarian	120	0.20%
Total	60,323	100%

== Education ==
=== Public schools ===
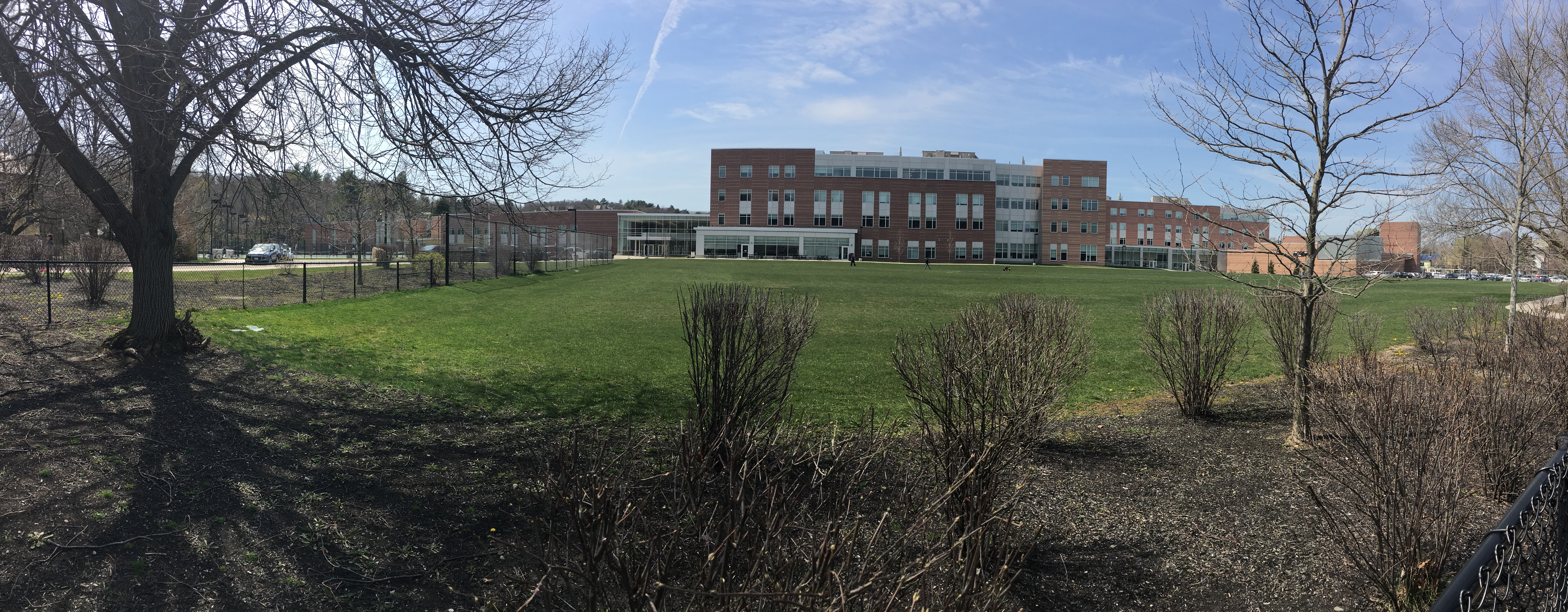
A panoramic view of Newton North High School

Public education is provided by Newton Public Schools.

==== Elementary ====
- Angier Elementary School
- Bowen Elementary School
- Burr Elementary School
- Cabot Elementary School
- Countryside Elementary School
- Franklin Elementary School
- Horace Mann Elementary School
- Lincoln Eliot Elementary School
- Mason Rice Elementary School
- Memorial Spaulding Elementary School
- Peirce Elementary School
- Underwood Elementary School
- Ward Elementary School
- Williams Elementary School
- Zervas Elementary School

==== Middle schools ====
- Bigelow Middle School
- Brown Middle School
- Oak Hill Middle School
- F.A. Day Middle School

==== High schools ====
- Newton North High School
- Newton South High School

=== Private schools ===
- Fessenden School is a K–9 day and 5–9 boarding school for boys.
- Jackson School is a private, Catholic elementary school sponsored by the Sisters of Saint Joseph of Boston.
- Newton Country Day School
- Schechter Boston is a K–8 Conservative Jewish day school.
- Wellan Montessori (formerly Newton Montessori School) is a K–8 private school.
- Mount Alvernia High School is a private girls' school for grades 7–12.
- Mount Alvernia Academy is an independent Catholic School for preschool through grade 6.
- Fusion Academy

=== Higher education ===
Colleges and universities located in Newton include:

- Boston College in Chestnut Hill
- Boston College Law School in Newton Centre
- Hebrew College in Newton Centre
- Lasell University in Auburndale
- Mount Ida Campus of UMass Amherst in Oak Hill, formerly the site of Mount Ida College
- William James College in Oak Hill, formerly Massachusetts School of Professional Psychology

=== Former colleges ===
==== Newton Junior College ====
Newton Junior College, operated by the Newton Public Schools, opened in 1946 to serve the needs of returning veterans who otherwise would not have been able to continue their education due to the overcrowding of colleges and universities at that time. It used the facilities of Newton High School (now Newton North High School) until its own adjacent campus was built. It closed in 1976 due to declining enrollment and increased costs. The availability of such places as UMass Boston contributed to its demise. According to the city, its former campus is now "Claflin Park," a 25-unit multi-family development.

==== Others ====
Other former colleges include Aquinas College (1961–1999), Mount Alvernia College (1959–1973), Mount Ida College (1899–2018), and Newton College of the Sacred Heart (1946–1975). Andover Newton Theological School relocated to New Haven, Connecticut (1807–2017).

== Media ==
=== News ===
The city's community newspaper The Newton TAB, a weekly print paper published by the Community Newspaper Company, and owned by Gatehouse Media, ceased print publication in May 2022. The Newton Patch covers daily local news out of Newton and offers a platform for locals to post opinion, events, news tips and blogs on the community online platform as well. The Newton Voice. The Newton community is also served by its high school publications, including Newton North High School's Newtonite and Newton South High School's Lion's Roar and Denebola. Fig City News is a free, online community news resource founded by resident volunteers to cover local news and community events in Newton. The Boston Globe occasionally covers Newton.

=== Television ===
Residents of Newton have access to a state-of-the-art television studio and community media center, NewTV, located at 23 Needham Street in Newton Highlands. Newton is also home to NECN, a regional news network owned by NBC. In addition, Newton, bordering Brighton, a neighborhood of Boston has the WGBH Studios

=== Radio ===
From 1968 to 2017, the studios and transmitter of WNTN AM-1550 were on Rumford Avenue in Auburndale.

== Infrastructure ==
=== Hospital ===
Newton-Wellesley Hospital, which is owned by Mass General Hospital, is located at 2014 Washington Street in Newton. U.S. News & World Report ranks the hospital 13th best in the Boston metro area.

=== Transportation ===
Newton is well-served by three modes of mass transit run by the MBTA: light rail, commuter rail, and bus service. The Green Line D branch, (also known as the Riverside branch) is a light rail line running through the center of the city that makes very frequent trips to downtown Boston, ranging from 10 to 30 minutes away, terminating in Newton Lower Falls. The Green Line B branch ends across from Boston College on Commonwealth Avenue, virtually at the border of Boston's Brighton neighborhood and the City of Newton (an area which encompasses an unincorporated suburban village referred to as Chestnut Hill). The MBTA Worcester commuter rail, serving the northern villages of Newton that are proximate to Waltham, offers less frequent service to Boston. It runs from every half-an-hour during peak times to every couple of hours otherwise. The northern villages are also served by frequent express buses that go to downtown Boston via the Massachusetts Turnpike as well as Waltham.

Newton Centre, which is centered around the MBTA station of the same name, has been lauded as an example of transit-oriented development.

The Massachusetts Turnpike (Interstate 90), which basically follows the old Boston and Albany Railroad main line right-of-way, runs east and west through Newton, while Route 128 (Interstate 95) slices through the extreme western part of the city in the Lower Falls area. Route 30 (Commonwealth Avenue), Route 16 (Watertown Street west to West Newton, where it follows Washington Street west) and route 9 (Worcester Turnpike or Boylston Street) also run east and west through the city. Another major Boston (and Brookline) street, Beacon Street, runs west from the Boston city line to Washington Street west of the hospital, where it terminates at Washington Street.

There are no major north–south roads through Newton: every north–south street in Newton terminates within Newton at one end or the other. The only possible exception is Needham Street, which is north–south at the border between Newton and Needham, but it turns east and becomes Dedham Street, and when it reaches the Boston border, it goes south-east.

There are some north–south streets that are important to intra-Newton traveling. Centre Street runs south from the Watertown town line to Newton Highlands, where it becomes Winchester Street and terminates at Nahanton Street. Walnut Street runs south from Newtonville, where it starts at Crafts Street, down to Newton Highlands, where it ends at Dedham Street.

Due to necessary accessibility renovations, the Newtonville Commuter Rail Station will close from December 2026 and will open in spring 2029.

=== Public safety ===
The City of Newton Police Department has 139 sworn officers. The Newton Fire Department is fully paid and operates six engine companies, three ladder companies, and one rescue company from six stations.

== Cemeteries ==
- East Parish Burying Ground, called Centre Street Cemetery by the city, dates from 1664
- West Parish Burying Ground (River Street Cemetery), West Newton, public
- St. Mary's Episcopal Church and Cemetery, 258 Concord Avenue, Newton Lower Falls, private
- South Burying Ground called Winchester Street Cemetery or Evergreen Cemetery by the city, public
- Newton Cemetery & Arboretum, Newton Center, private

== In popular culture ==
- The Fig Newton cookie is named after the city. In 1991, Newton and Nabisco hosted a celebration of the 100th anniversary of the Fig Newton. A 100-inch (250 cm) Fig Newton was served, and singer and guitarist Juice Newton performed.
- Several scenes from the 1994 film The Next Karate Kid were filmed in Newton, including the house of the protagonist, who was played by Hilary Swank.
- William Landay's 2012 crime-drama novel Defending Jacob is set in Newton. The web television miniseries adaptation of the novel, starring Chris Evans as main character Andy Barber, was filmed in various locations of the city
- A portion of crime drama film Patriots Day, based on the events of the Boston Marathon bombing, was filmed at Lasell University (then Lasell College) in Newton on May 18, 2016.
- Principal photography of the comedy film Sex Tape, starring Cameron Diaz and Jason Segel, took place in Newton on September 12, 2013.
- A scene from the 2008 remake of The Women was filmed on the banks of Bulloughs Pond. The setting was used as the backdrop of a New York suburban town.
- One of the main plot lines from the American spy drama series The Americans episode "Dyatkovo" is set in Newton. In the episode, Philip and Elizabeth are assigned to travel to Newton, where they must investigate Natalie Granholm, a woman suspected of being a Nazi collaborator, Anna Prokopchuk, that was involved in executions at Dyatkovo during World War II.

== Sister cities ==
Newton is currently twinned with:

- San Donato Val di Comino, Lazio, Italy
- San Juan del Sur, Nicaragua

== See also ==
- Churches in Newton, Massachusetts
- Crystal Lake and Pleasant Street Historic District
- Geology of Massachusetts
- Green Line A branch (abandoned)
- National Register of Historic Places listings in Newton, Massachusetts
- Reginald A. Fessenden House, which is the only National Historic Landmark located in Newton
- Silent Spring Institute
- Shaarei Tefillah
- Adams Street Shul
