= Mount Ida College =

Private college in Newton, Massachusetts, US (1899–2018)

- Former names: Mount Ida School for Girls, Mount Ida Junior College
- Type: Private
- Active: 1899–2018; 8 years ago
- Affiliations: NCAA Division III
- Location: Newton, Massachusetts, United States; 42°17′39″N 71°11′36″W
- Campus: 72 acres (29 ha); Suburban
- Colors: Green & White
- Nickname: Mustangs
- Mascot: Mustangs

Mount Ida College was a private college in Newton, Massachusetts, United States.

In 2018, the University of Massachusetts Amherst acquired the campus and renamed it the Mount Ida Campus of UMass Amherst, a center for learning and professional development that facilitates connections between UMass Amherst and industries and communities in the Greater Boston area.

In January 2026, UMass Amherst renamed the Mount Ida Campus to the Charles River Campus of UMass Amherst.

== History ==
The Mount Ida School for Girls, once a high school, became a finishing school and was founded in 1899 by George Franklin Jewett, and was named after the hill on which it was located in Newton Corner, Massachusetts.

After encountering severe financial difficulties, it was forced to close during the Great Depression, but was purchased by William Fitts Carlson in 1939 and relocated to its present location in the Oak Hill section of Newton.

The first junior college level courses were offered at Mount Ida in the mid-1900s, and the school was officially re-branded as a junior college in 1961. It was subsequently granted the ability to award associate degrees with the first being awarded in 1967.

The school was later renamed as Mount Ida Junior College, and became a co-educational institution in 1972 which was a logical step since many Vietnam veterans were attending college in the 1970s thanks to the G.I. Bill. Several Boston-based institutions also merged with Mount Ida on the Newton campus: Chamberlayne Junior College (1988), New England Institute of Funeral Service Education (1989), and Coyne Electrical and Technical School.

The Senior College division awarding bachelor's degrees began in 1982. Massachusetts allowed Mount Ida to grant three bachelor's degrees as Mount Ida filed to drop the "Junior" part of the college name. The Senior Degree program was fully accredited in 1984, with an emphasis on career and professional education. In 2012, Barry Brown was appointed president of the college.

=== Chamberlayne Junior College ===
Chamberlayne Junior College, was founded in 1892, as the Chamberlayne School, by Miss Catherine J. Chamberlayne. In 1932 it became a junior college. In 1988, it merged with Mount Ida College, as the Chamberlayne School of Design and Merchandising.

=== Acquisition by the University of Massachusetts ===
UMass Amherst announced plans to acquire the Newton campus in April 2018. Classes ended after the commencement in the spring of 2018 and students of the small school were offered automatic admission to UMass Dartmouth (though that university did not have all of the same academic programs). Newbury College (which itself closed in 2019) announced that it would grant full transfer credit to Mount Ida students and would help them finish their degrees. Keene State College and Worcester State University also invited students to their campuses and committed to review applications for immediate acceptance and full credit transfer. Student records and transcripts are also maintained by UMass Amherst.

In January 2026, UMass Amherst renamed the Mount Ida Campus to the Charles River Campus of UMass Amherst.

== Campus ==
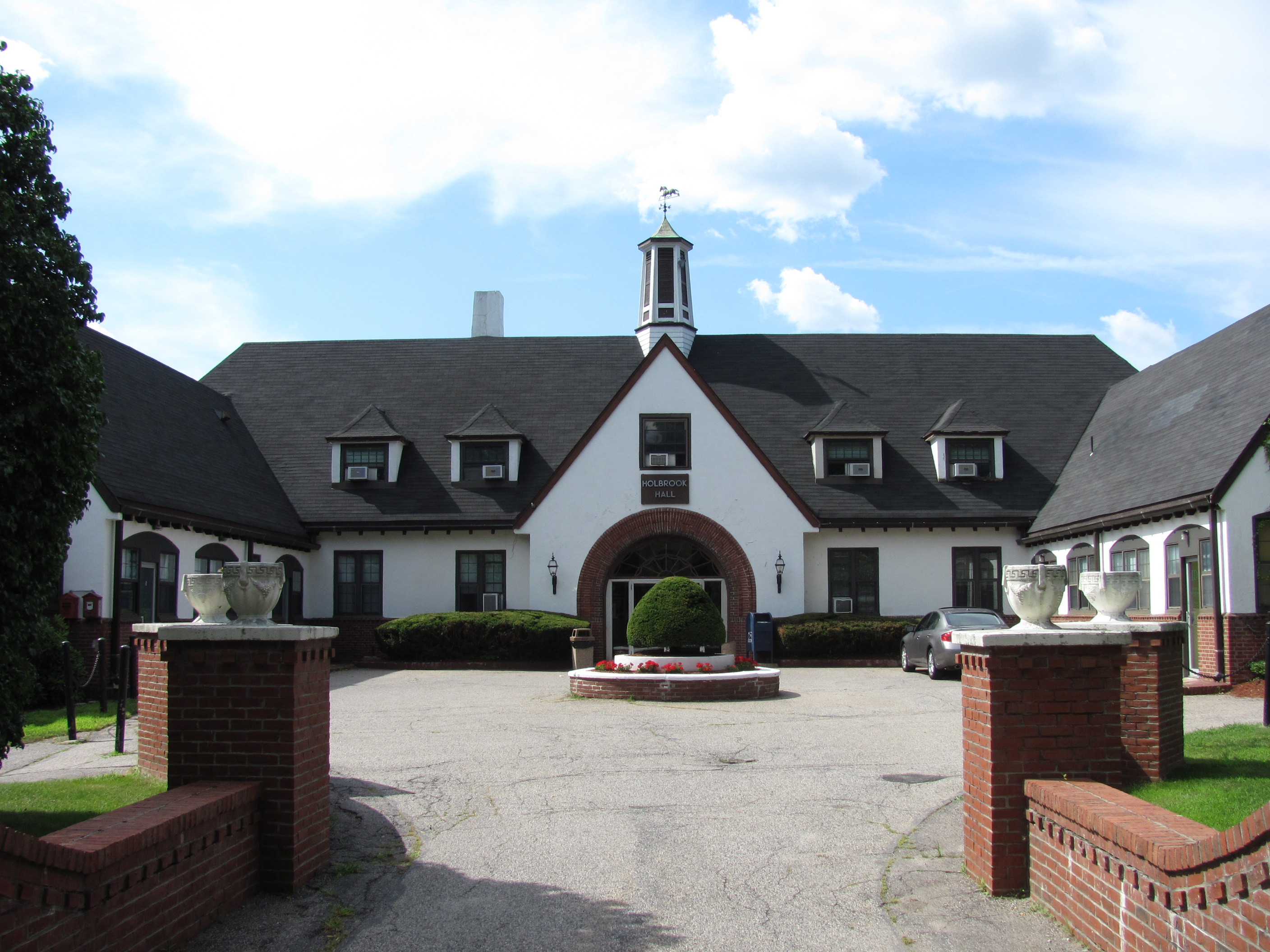
Holbrook Hall

Located in Newton, Massachusetts, Mount Ida College was located on a 72-acre (29 ha) campus that once belonged to William Sumner Appleton (1840–1903), father of William Sumner Appleton Jr. The estate was transferred to Robert Gould Shaw II after Appleton's death. Shaw commissioned Boston architect James Lovell Little Junior to build a carriage house and horse stable in 1910; this building was subsequently refurbished and was known as Holbrook Hall. The building known as Shaw Hall, which became the nucleus for the Mount Ida campus, was also commissioned by Shaw and designed by Little in 1912. The building known as Hallden Academic Support Center was also constructed in 1912, presumably by Little.

The Shaw fortune collapsed during the Great Depression, and Dr. Carlson purchased the vacant and decaying Shaw Estate and reopened Mount Ida Junior College in 1939. In 1956, a two-story dormitory designed by architect Albert C. Rugo was added to Shaw Hall. Rugo designed several other buildings that were added to the complex in the 1950s and 1960s.

== Academics ==
Mount Ida College consisted of four schools (which included some prominent stand-alone schools prior to merger)

- The School of Applied Sciences
  - The New England Institute of Mortuary Science
- The School of Design
- The School of Business
- The School of Social Sciences and Humanities

The Gallery at Mount Ida College held exhibitions of regional, national, and international fine artists and designers. The Gallery had featured works in photography, painting, sculpture, video, and a variety of other art forms. The Gallery opened in 1999, allowing artists and designers to have a showcase for traditional and alternative media works as an innovative part of the Mount Ida College Learning Community.

== Athletics ==
Mount Ida's athletes competed as the Mustangs in the Great Northeast Athletic Conference in NCAA Division III varsity sports, as well as IHSA equestrian competition. Three teams captured North Atlantic Conference (NAC) championships: the 1999, 2000 men's soccer team, the 2002 women's volleyball team, and the 2007 men's lacrosse team. The Mount Ida Mustangs football team competed from 1999 to 2017, compiling an all-time record of 76–119 in 19 seasons and sharing the Eastern Collegiate Football Conference (ECFC) championship in 2012.

== Notable alumni ==
- Enid A. Haupt, publisher and philanthropist
- Wishnutama Kusubandio, Minister of Tourism and Creative Economy of The Republic of Indonesia from 2019 to 2020
- Thomas Menino, Mayor of Boston from 1993 to 2014, earned his associate degree in 1963 from Chamberlayne Junior College, which later became part of Mount Ida College
- Gary Vaynerchuk, serial entrepreneur and author
