= Politics of Massachusetts =

Politics of a U.S. state

The Commonwealth of Massachusetts is often categorized politically as progressive and liberal. All of the state's U.S. representatives and senators are Democrats. Democrats also form the large majority of the state's legislature, though the state has a history of electing Republican governors. As with the rest of the states, the two main political parties are the Democratic Party and the Republican Party.

== History ==
=== Antebellum ===
In the early 19th century, Boston was a center of the socially progressive movements in antebellum New England. The abolitionist, women's rights, and temperance movements all originated in New England, and Boston became a stronghold of such movements. Boston also flourished culturally with the works of Ralph Waldo Emerson and Nathaniel Hawthorne becoming popular. The belief in social progress was strongly influenced by the Second Great Awakening sweeping the Northern United States at the time, and Boston gained a reputation for radical politics. During the Civil War, the Radical Republicans had strong support from Massachusetts. Tension, however, existed between more moderate and conservative Bostonians and the abolitionists. Abolitionist William Lloyd Garrison was almost killed by a mob when his office was raided in 1837.

The state was politically dominated by Federalists from the late 1790s until the late 1820s, a longer period than in other states. Massachusetts voted for the Federalist presidential candidate in 1808, 1812, and 1816. From then until the 1850s, it was dominated by the Whig Party, which presented a socially liberal but pro-business agenda, against a fractured Democratic Party and occasional single-issue third parties. In 1850, the Democrats made common cause with the abolitionist Free Soil Party to gain control of both the governor's seat and the state legislature for the first time. This coalition did not last, and the existing party structures were effectively wiped out by the 1853 landslide victory of the Know Nothing movement, which enacted major reform legislation during its three years in power. The Republican Party was organized in 1854, and came to power in 1857. It would dominate the state's politics until the 1930s, first as the reform party opposed to slavery, then as a pro-business, generally anti-labor and temperance-oriented party. The reorganized Democratic Party remained largely ineffective during this time, typically gaining power only when the Republicans overreached on issues such as temperance.

=== Gilded Age and Progressive Era ===
After the Civil War, radical politics faded in popularity. With Reconstruction failing, the progressive climate gave way into a conservative one, and civil rights groups disappeared as Boston melted into the mainstream of American politics. During the first half of the 1900s, Boston was socially conservative and strongly under the influence of Methodist minister J. Frank Chase and his New England Watch and Ward Society, founded in 1878. In 1903, the Old Corner Bookstore was raided and fined for selling Boccaccio's Decameron. Howard Johnson's got its start when Eugene O'Neill's Strange Interlude was banned in Boston, and the production had to be moved to Quincy. In 1927, works by Sinclair Lewis, Ernest Hemingway, John Dos Passos, and Sherwood Anderson were removed from bookstore shelves. "Banned in Boston" on a book's cover could actually boost sales. Burlesque artists such as Sally Rand needed to modify their act when performing at Boston's Old Howard Theater. The clean version of a performance used to be known as the "Boston version." By 1929, the Watch and Ward society was perceived to be in decline when it failed in its attempt to ban Theodore Dreiser's An American Tragedy, but as late as 1935 it succeeded in banning Lillian Hellman's play The Children's Hour. Censorship was enforced by city officials, notably the "city censor" within the Boston Licensing Division. That position was held by Richard J. Sinnott from 1959 until the office was abolished on March 2, 1982. In modern times, few such puritanical social mores persist. Massachusetts has since gained a reputation as being a politically liberal state and is often used as an archetype of liberalism, hence the usage of the phrase "Massachusetts liberal".

In the 1920s, Democrats Joseph Buell Ely (governor in the early 1930s) and David I. Walsh (governor in the 1910s, then US Senator) successfully organized a wide array of liberal Yankees, Irish Americans, and other immigrant groups (eastern Europeans, Italians, Greeks, and French Canadians among them) into an effective party structure, that has since come to dominate the state's political establishment. This goal had eluded Irish and Boston interests led by James Michael Curley and John F. "Honey Fitz" Fitzgerald, who were a significant but not always dominating force in the party. Fitzgerald's daughter Rose married Joseph P. Kennedy Sr., beginning the Kennedy family dynasty.

=== Postwar ===
In the 1970s and 1980s, Massachusetts was the center of the anti-nuclear power movement, opposition to the continuing Cold War arms race, and Ronald Reagan's policies of intervention in Central America. Political figures who opposed nuclear power included Senator Edward Kennedy, Senator John Kerry (Vietnam veteran), Tip O'Neill (Speaker of the House), and Michael Dukakis (Governor). The Montague Nuclear Power Plant was to consist of two 1,150-megawatt nuclear reactors to be located in Montague, Massachusetts. The project was proposed in 1973 and canceled in 1980, after $29 million was spent on the project. In 1974, farmer Sam Lovejoy disabled the weather-monitoring tower which had been erected at the Montague site. Lovejoy's action galvanized local public opinion against the plant.

== Politics ==
=== State ===
Massachusetts has a bicameral state legislature, collectively known as the Massachusetts General Court. It is made of the 160-seat Massachusetts House of Representatives and the 40-seat Massachusetts Senate. The Massachusetts Democratic Party holds large supermajorities in both houses.

The Governor of Massachusetts is the executive of the state government, and is elected every four years. Prior to 1966, governors served two-year terms, and prior to 1920, governors served one-year terms. The Massachusetts Supreme Judicial Court is the highest court in the commonwealth. Despite the state's strong Democratic lean, Republicans have been able to win the governor's office. They held it almost continuously from 1991 to 2023 with the only exception being Democrat Deval Patrick (2007–2015). Although, they have mostly been among the most moderate Republican politicians in the nation, especially William Weld. Two of these governors, Paul Cellucci and Jane Swift, took office when their predecessors resigned to take other positions. Massachusetts' most recent Republican governor was centrist Republican Charlie Baker, who was re-elected to his second term in 2018 with 66.6% of the vote.

Gubernatorial election results

Gubernatorial election results
Year	Democratic	Republican
2022	63.7% 1,584,403	34.6% 859,343
2018	33.1% 886,281	66.6% 1,781,982
2014	46.5% 1,004,408	48.4% 1,044,573
2010	48.4% 1,112,283	42.0% 964,866
2006	55.6% 1,234,984	35.3% 784,342
2002	44.9% 985,981	49.8% 1,091,988
1998	47.4% 901,843	50.8% 967,160
1994	28.3% 611,650	70.8% 1,533,390
1990	46.9% 1,099,878	50.2% 1,175,817
1986	68.7% 1,157,786	31.2% 525,364
1982	59.5% 1,219,109	36.6% 749,679
1978	51.2% 1,030,294	46.0% 926,072
1974	53.5% 992,284	42.3% 784,353
1970	42.8% 799,269	56.7% 1,058,623
1966	36.9% 752,720	62.6% 1,277,358
1964	49.3% 1,153,416	50.3% 1,176,462
1962	49.9% 1,053,322	49.7% 1,047,891
1960	46.8% 1,130,810	52.5% 1,269,295
1958	56.2% 1,067,020	43.1% 818,463
1956	52.8% 1,234,618	46.9% 1,096,759
1954	47.8% 910,087	51.8% 985,339
1952	49.3% 1,161,499	49.9% 1,175,955
1950	56.3% 1,074,570	43.1% 824,069
1948	59.0% 1,239,247	40.5% 849,895
1946	45.3% 762,743	54.1% 911,152
1944	53.6% 1,048,284	46.0% 897,708
1942	45.0% 630,265	54.1% 758,402
1940	49.5% 993,635	49.7% 999,223
1938	46.1% 793,884	53.3% 941,465
1936	47.6% 867,743	46.1% 839,740
1934	49.7% 736,463	42.3% 627,413
1932	52.8% 825,479	45.0% 704,576
1930	49.5% 606,902	48.2% 590,238
1928	48.8% 750,137	50.1% 769,372
1926	40.3% 407,389	58.8% 595,006
1924	42.2% 490,010	56.0% 650,817
1922	45.4% 404,192	52.2% 464,873
1920	30.2% 290,350	67.0% 643,869
1919	37.0% 192,673	60.9% 317,774
1918	46.8% 197,828	50.9% 214,863
1917	35.0% 135,676	58.3% 226,145
1916	43.7% 229,883	52.5% 276,123
1915	45.7% 229,550	47.0% 235,863
1914	45.9% 210,442	43.4% 198,627
1913	39.8% 183,267	25.3% 116,705
1912	40.3% 193,184	30.0% 143,597
1911	48.8% 214,897	47.0% 206,795
1910	52.0% 229,352	44.1% 194,173

=== Federal ===
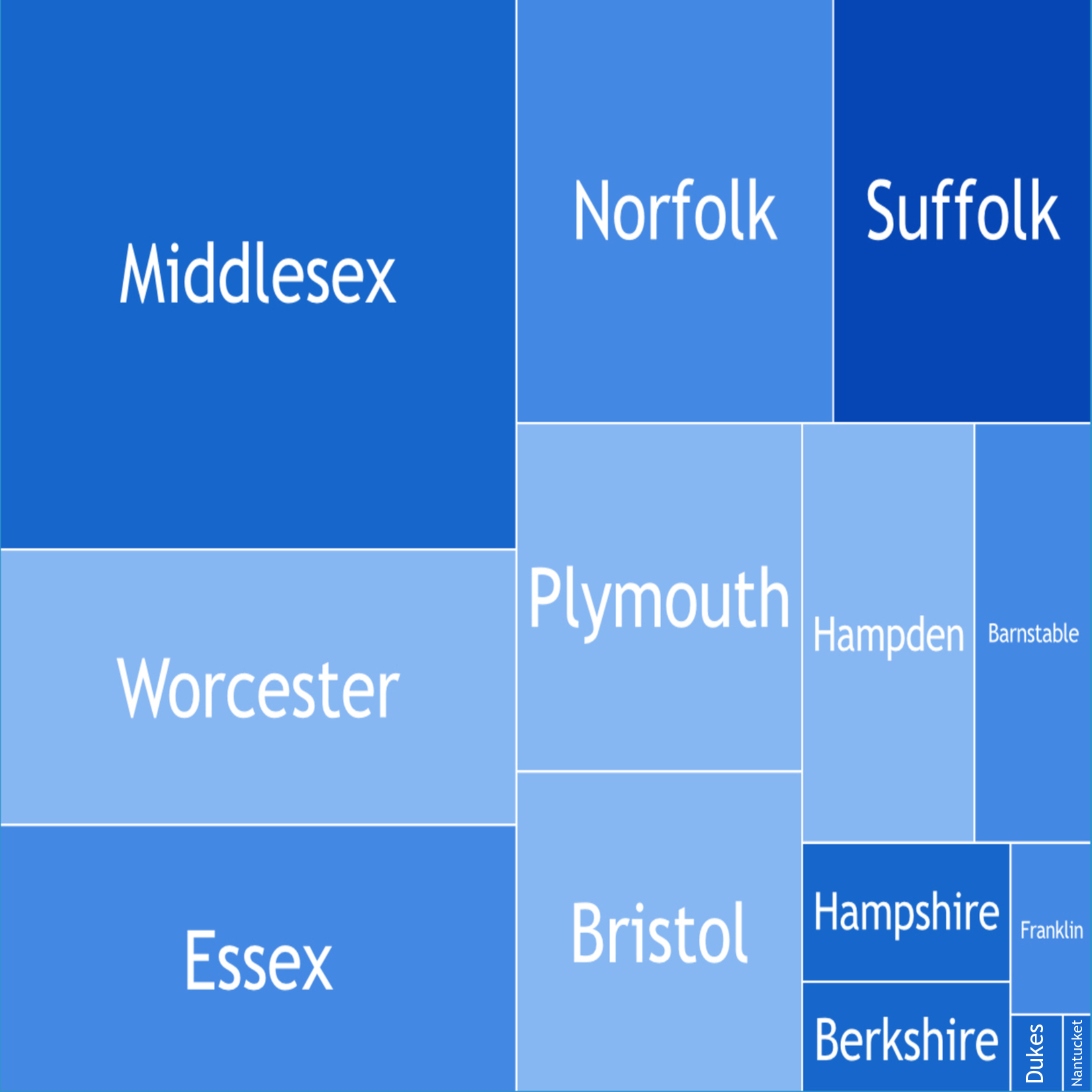
Treemap of the 2020 United States presidential election in Massachusetts. Biden: 50-60% 60-70% 70-80% 80-90%

Massachusetts currently has nine seats. In the 118th Congress, all nine are held by Democrats (Republicans have not won a House seat since 1994):

- Massachusetts's 1st congressional district represented by Richard Neal (D)
- Massachusetts's 2nd congressional district represented by Jim McGovern (D)
- Massachusetts's 3rd congressional district represented by Lori Trahan (D)
- Massachusetts's 4th congressional district represented by Jake Auchincloss (D)
- Massachusetts's 5th congressional district represented by Katherine Clark (D)
- Massachusetts's 6th congressional district represented by Seth Moulton (D)
- Massachusetts's 7th congressional district represented by Ayanna Pressley (D)
- Massachusetts's 8th congressional district represented by Stephen Lynch (D)
- Massachusetts's 9th congressional district represented by Bill Keating (D)

Massachusetts is part of the United States District Court for the District of Massachusetts in the federal judiciary. The district's cases are appealed to the Boston-based United States Court of Appeals for the First Circuit.

Massachusetts has two Democratic U.S. senators, belonging to Class 1 and 2, they are Elizabeth Warren and Ed Markey, respectively, both serving since 2013.

In presidential elections, Massachusetts supported Republicans from 1856 through 1924, barring 1912, where due to vote splitting between former Republican President Theodore Roosevelt running as a Progressive against incumbent Republican President William Howard Taft, Democratic candidate Woodrow Wilson ended up becoming the first Democratic presidential candidate to win Massachusetts, though only winning with a plurality of only 35.53% of the vote. From 1928 up until the 1960s, it was considered a Democratic-leaning swing state. During the 1972 presidential election, Massachusetts was the only state to give its electoral votes to George McGovern, the Democratic nominee (the District of Columbia also voted for McGovern). Following the resignation of President Richard Nixon in 1974, two famous bumper stickers were sold in Boston, one saying "Don't blame me, I'm from Massachusetts," and the other read "Nixon 49, America 1". Since 1928, the state has been carried by a Republican presidential candidate four times, for Dwight D. Eisenhower in 1952 and 1956, and in 1980, when Ronald Reagan unseated incumbent Jimmy Carter and in his 1984 landslide. However, in the latter two elections, Reagan's margin of victory in Massachusetts was the smallest of any state he carried.

More recently, it has shifted to the Democratic Party further, voting for the Democratic presidential candidate in every election since 1988. Republicans have not carried any county since that election. In the 2004 election, Massachusetts gave native son John Kerry 61.9% of the vote and his largest margin of victory in any state. (Note: However, the greatest margin of Democratic victory was in the District of Columbia.) Barack Obama carried the state with 61.8% of the vote in 2008 and 60.7% in 2012. In 2016, Hillary Clinton won the state with 61.0% of the vote, with Massachusetts trending to the left, opposite the nation. In 2020, Massachusetts was the second-most Democratic state, following Vermont. Joe Biden won 65.6% of the vote, the highest share for any candidate since Lyndon Johnson's landslide victory in 1964.

The Democratic shift is also evident on the congressional ballot. In 2020, four of Massachusetts' nine U.S. House Representatives ran unopposed. In the same year's U.S. Senate election, incumbent Ed Markey received two-thirds of the vote, even slightly surpassing Biden's vote percentage.

United States presidential election results for Massachusetts
Year	Republican / Whig		Democratic		Third party(ies)	
Year	No.	%	No.	%	No.	%
1836	41,201	55.13%	33,486	44.81%	45	0.06%
1840	72,852	57.44%	52,355	41.28%	1,618	1.28%
1844	67,062	50.79%	53,039	40.17%	11,936	9.04%
1848	61,072	45.32%	35,281	26.18%	38,395	28.49%
1852	52,683	41.45%	44,569	35.07%	29,851	23.49%
1856	108,172	63.61%	39,244	23.08%	22,632	13.31%
1860	106,684	62.80%	34,370	20.23%	28,822	16.97%
1864	126,742	72.22%	48,745	27.78%	3	0.00%
1868	136,379	69.76%	59,103	30.23%	26	0.01%
1872	133,455	69.20%	59,195	30.69%	214	0.11%
1876	150,064	57.80%	108,777	41.90%	779	0.30%
1880	165,198	58.53%	111,720	39.58%	5,347	1.89%
1884	146,724	48.36%	122,352	40.33%	34,307	11.31%
1888	183,892	53.42%	151,590	44.04%	8,761	2.55%
1892	202,814	51.87%	176,813	45.22%	11,401	2.92%
1896	278,976	69.47%	105,711	26.32%	16,881	4.20%
1900	238,866	57.59%	156,997	37.85%	18,941	4.57%
1904	257,822	57.92%	165,746	37.24%	21,541	4.84%
1908	265,966	58.21%	155,543	34.04%	35,410	7.75%
1912	155,948	31.95%	173,408	35.53%	158,701	32.52%
1916	268,784	50.54%	247,894	46.61%	15,154	2.85%
1920	681,153	68.55%	276,691	27.84%	35,874	3.61%
1924	703,476	62.26%	280,831	24.86%	145,530	12.88%
1928	775,566	49.15%	792,758	50.24%	9,499	0.60%
1932	736,959	46.64%	800,148	50.64%	43,007	2.72%
1936	768,613	41.76%	942,716	51.22%	129,028	7.01%
1940	939,700	46.36%	1,076,522	53.11%	10,771	0.53%
1944	921,350	46.99%	1,035,296	52.80%	4,019	0.20%
1948	909,370	43.16%	1,151,788	54.66%	45,988	2.18%
1952	1,292,325	54.22%	1,083,525	45.46%	7,548	0.32%
1956	1,393,197	59.32%	948,190	40.37%	7,119	0.30%
1960	976,750	39.55%	1,487,174	60.22%	5,556	0.22%
1964	549,727	23.44%	1,786,422	76.19%	8,649	0.37%
1968	766,844	32.89%	1,469,218	63.01%	95,690	4.10%
1972	1,112,078	45.23%	1,332,540	54.20%	14,138	0.58%
1976	1,030,276	40.44%	1,429,475	56.11%	87,807	3.45%
1980	1,057,631	41.90%	1,053,802	41.75%	412,865	16.36%
1984	1,310,936	51.22%	1,239,606	48.43%	8,911	0.35%
1988	1,194,635	45.37%	1,401,415	53.23%	36,755	1.40%
1992	805,049	29.03%	1,318,662	47.54%	649,863	23.43%
1996	718,107	28.09%	1,571,763	61.47%	266,915	10.44%
2000	878,502	32.50%	1,616,487	59.80%	207,995	7.70%
2004	1,071,109	36.78%	1,803,800	61.94%	37,479	1.29%
2008	1,108,854	35.99%	1,904,098	61.80%	68,117	2.21%
2012	1,188,460	37.52%	1,921,761	60.67%	57,546	1.82%
2016	1,090,893	32.81%	1,995,196	60.01%	238,957	7.19%
2020	1,167,202	32.14%	2,382,202	65.60%	81,998	2.26%
2024	1,251,303	36.02%	2,126,518	61.22%	95,847	2.76%

== Party registration ==
Party registration as of February 2023
Party	Total voters	Percentage
Unenrolled	2,920,375	61.08%
Democratic	1,386,550	29.00%
Republican	421,333	8.81%
Political designations	36,750	0.77%
Libertarian	16,548	0.35%
Total	4,781,556	100%

Unenrolled voters make up a majority of the state. The only county with a plurality of Democratic registered voters is Suffolk, home to the state's capital and most-populous city, Boston. The percentage of Unenrolled voters statewide is on the rise while both Democratic and Republican registration are in decline.

== Notable Massachusetts political figures ==
- John F. Kennedy, 35th President of the United States (1961-1963)
- Ted Kennedy, U.S senator (1962-2009)
- Elizabeth Warren, U.S senator (2013-)
- Mitt Romney, Governor of Massachusetts (2003-2007), 2012 presidential candidate.
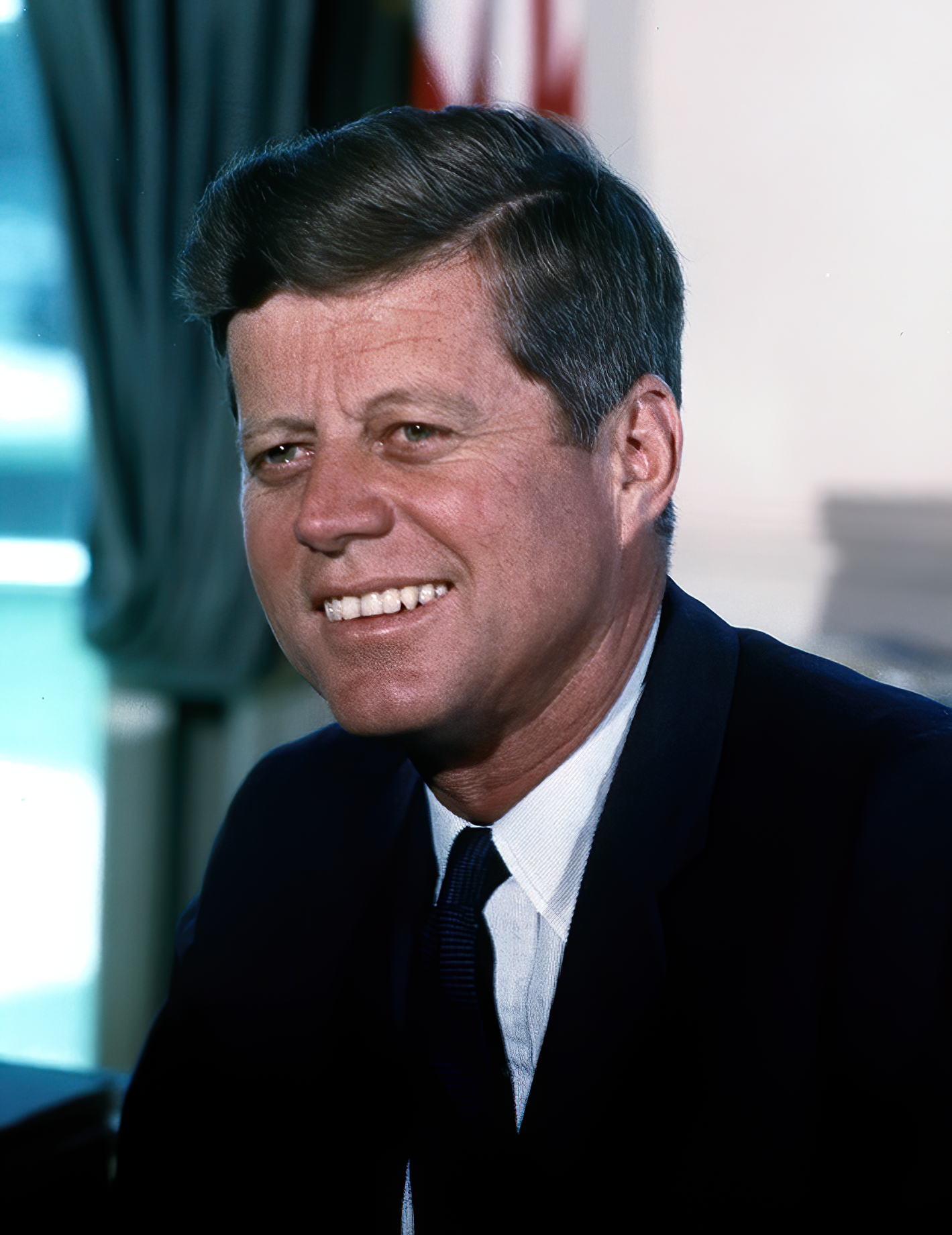
John F. Kennedy

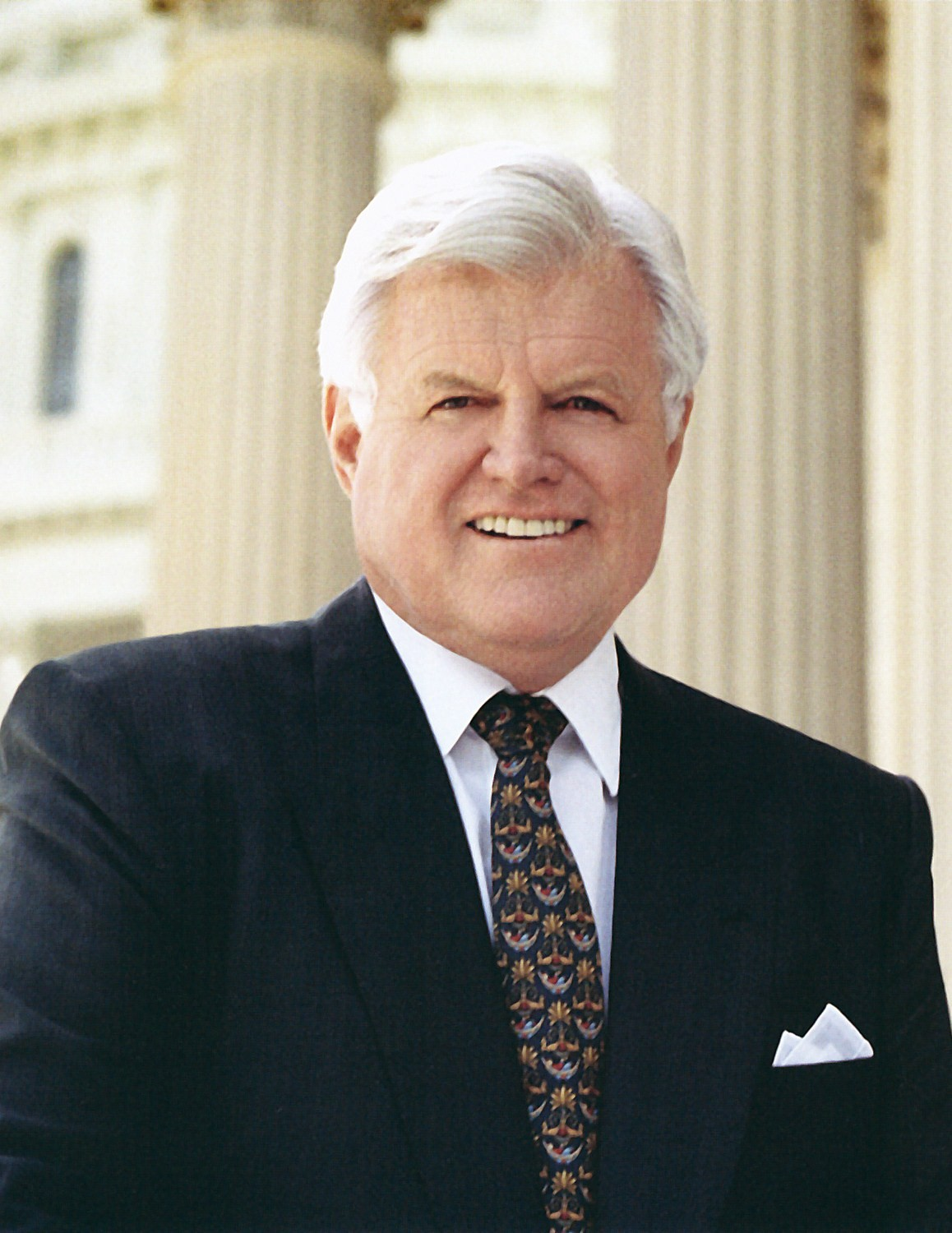
Ted Kennedy

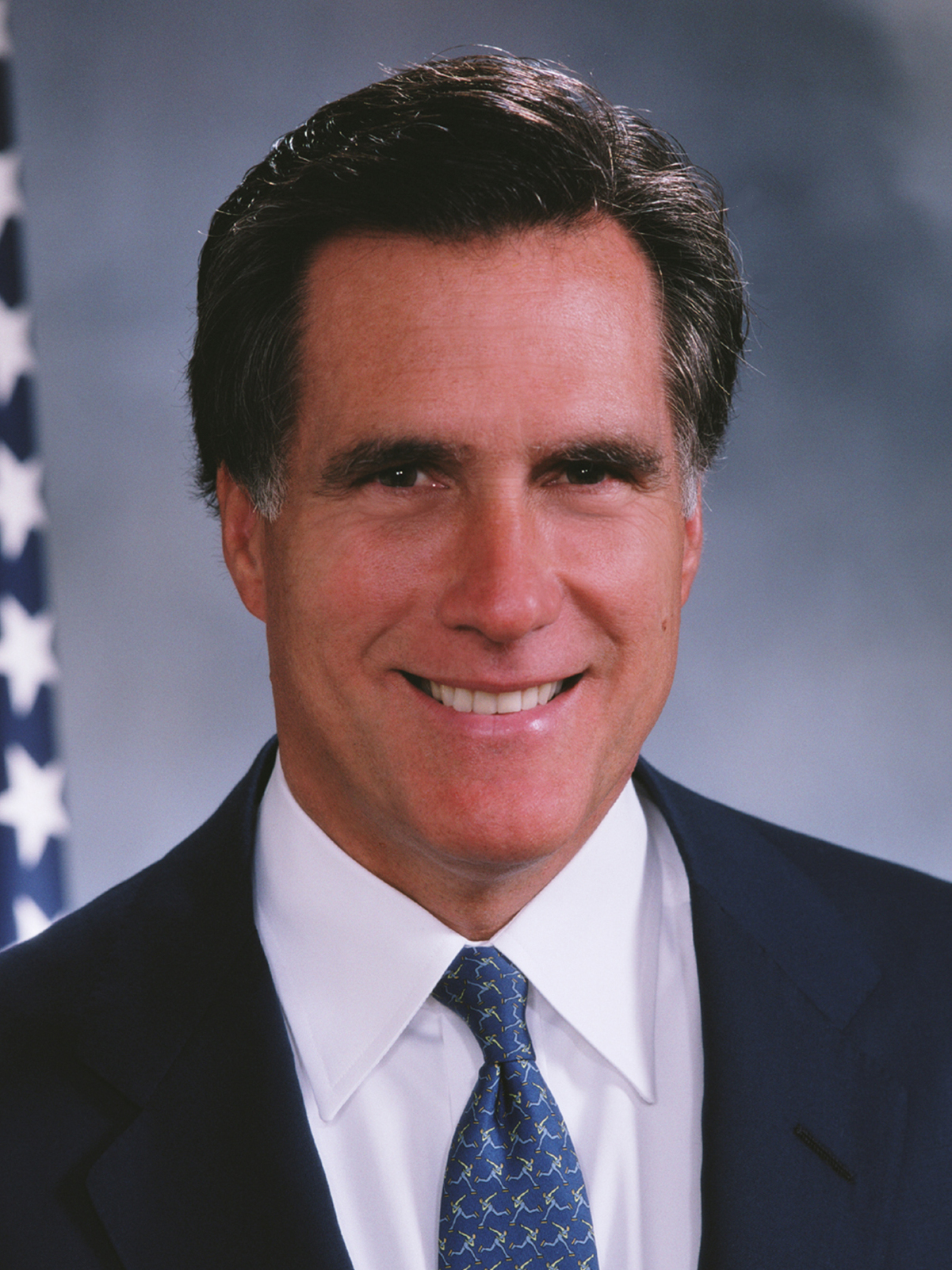
Mitt Romney

== See also ==
- Government of Massachusetts
- Elections in Massachusetts
- Political party strength in Massachusetts
- Law of Massachusetts
- Massachusetts liberal
- List of politics by U.S. state
