= 1932 United States presidential election in Massachusetts =

- November 8, 1932
- Turnout: 69.5% ▼4.5 pp

Nominee	Franklin D. Roosevelt	Herbert Hoover
Party	Democratic	Republican
Home state	New York	California
Running mate	John Nance Garner	Charles Curtis
Electoral vote	17	0
Popular vote	800,148	736,959
Percentage	50.64%	46.64%

Roosevelt
40–50%
50–60%
60–70%
70–80%
Hoover
40–50%
50–60%
60–70%
70–80%
80–90%
90–100%
President before election
Herbert Hoover
Republican
Elected President
Franklin D. Roosevelt
Democratic

The 1932 United States presidential election in Massachusetts took place on November 8, 1932, as part of the 1932 United States presidential election, which was held throughout all contemporary 48 states. Voters chose 17 representatives, or electors to the Electoral College, who voted for president and vice president.

Massachusetts voted for the Democratic nominee, Governor Franklin D. Roosevelt of New York, over the Republican nominee, incumbent President Herbert Hoover of California. Roosevelt ran with Speaker of the House John Nance Garner of Texas, and Hoover ran with incumbent Vice President Charles Curtis of Kansas.

Roosevelt carried the state with 50.64% of the vote to Hoover's 46.64%, a Democratic victory margin of 4.00%. Socialist candidate Norman Thomas came in a distant third, with 2.17%. Massachusetts had once been a typical Yankee Republican bastion in the wake of the Civil War, voting Republican in every election from 1856 until 1924, except in 1912, when former Republican President Theodore Roosevelt had run as a Progressive candidate against incumbent Republican President William Howard Taft, splitting the Republican vote and allowing Democrat Woodrow Wilson to win Massachusetts with a plurality of only 35.53% of the vote.

In 1920 and 1924, Republicans had carried Massachusetts by landslide margins, sweeping every county in the state, including a GOP victory in the city of Boston. However, in 1928, a coalition of Irish Catholic and other ethnic immigrant voters primarily based in urban areas turned out massively for Catholic Democrat Al Smith, making Massachusetts and neighboring Rhode Island the only states outside of the Solid South to vote Democratic that year, as Herbert Hoover won a third consecutive Republican landslide nationally. After 1912, 1928 was only the second time in history that Massachusetts had voted Democratic, and with 50.24% of the vote, Al Smith became the first Democratic presidential candidate ever to win a majority of the vote in Massachusetts.

Although Roosevelt was not a Catholic, the key to his victory in Massachusetts in 1932 was building on Smith's winning coalition, and bringing ethnic Catholic voters into the broader Democratic coalition. With the embattled incumbent President Hoover failing to adequately address the Great Depression, economic issues would motivate 1928 Smith voters to remain loyal to the Democrats in 1932. However the state was still closely divided between the newly emerging Democratic majority coalition, and its traditional New England Republican roots, and consequently, Massachusetts was one of FDR's weakest victories. New England as a whole was Hoover's most favorable region, giving him four of his six state victories. Although FDR performed much more strongly than Smith nationwide, he only slightly outperformed Smith in Massachusetts, and with the state weighing in as about 14% more Republican than the national average.

As Roosevelt won the state with the same coalition that had propelled Al Smith to victory four years earlier, the county map in 1932 remained the same as it was in 1928, with only percentages, margins, and turnout shifting. Roosevelt won the state despite carrying only 4 of the state's 14 counties. The most vital component to Roosevelt's victory was the Democratic dominance in Suffolk County, home to the state's capital and largest city, Boston. Like Smith, Roosevelt took over 60% of the vote in Suffolk County. Another crucial victory for Roosevelt was in Hampden County, home to the city of Springfield. The remaining two counties that went to FDR were Bristol County, south of the Boston area, and rural Berkshire County in the far west of the state. This is the most recent election in which the statewide winner did not carry Essex County.

== Results ==
1932 United States presidential election in Massachusetts
Party	Candidate	Votes	Percentage	Electoral votes
Democratic	Franklin D. Roosevelt	800,148	50.64%	17
Republican	Herbert Hoover (incumbent)	736,959	46.64%	0
Socialist	Norman Thomas	34,305	2.17%	0
Communist	William Z. Foster	4,821	0.31%	0
Socialist Labor	Verne L. Reynolds	2,668	0.17%	0
Prohibition	William Upshaw	1,142	0.07%	0
Write-ins	Write-ins	71	0.00%	0
Totals		1,580,114	100.00%	17

=== Results by county ===
County	Franklin D. Roosevelt Democratic		Herbert Hoover Republican		Various candidates Other parties		Margin		Total votes cast
County	#	%	#	%	#	%	#	%	Total votes cast
Barnstable	3,829	28.31%	9,476	70.05%	222	1.64%	-5,647	-41.74%	13,527
Berkshire	23,252	48.22%	23,186	48.08%	1,782	3.70%	66	0.14%	48,220
Bristol	62,474	53.55%	50,846	43.58%	3,355	2.88%	11,628	9.97%	116,675
Dukes	583	30.16%	1,330	68.80%	20	1.03%	-747	-38.64%	1,933
Essex	91,787	47.55%	95,277	49.36%	5,954	3.08%	-3,490	-1.81%	193,018
Franklin	6,248	31.64%	13,040	66.04%	459	2.32%	-6,792	-34.40%	19,747
Hampden	63,189	51.11%	55,032	44.52%	5,402	4.37%	8,157	6.59%	123,623
Hampshire	12,332	45.90%	13,241	49.28%	1,296	4.82%	-909	-3.38%	26,869
Middlesex	174,257	47.65%	184,486	50.45%	6,957	1.90%	-10,229	-2.80%	365,700
Nantucket	561	40.65%	812	58.84%	7	0.51%	-251	-18.19%	1,380
Norfolk	49,121	38.63%	75,232	59.17%	2,793	2.20%	-26,111	-20.54%	127,146
Plymouth	26,137	39.76%	37,729	57.39%	1,878	2.86%	-11,592	-17.63%	65,744
Suffolk	198,792	67.15%	88,737	29.97%	8,532	2.88%	110,055	37.18%	296,061
Worcester	87,586	48.55%	88,535	49.08%	4,279	2.37%	-949	-0.53%	180,400
Totals	800,148	50.64%	736,959	46.64%	43,007	2.72%	63,189	4.00%	1,580,114

== See also ==
- United States presidential elections in Massachusetts
