= 1920 United States presidential election in Massachusetts =

- November 2, 1920
- Turnout: 53.3% ▼9.5 pp
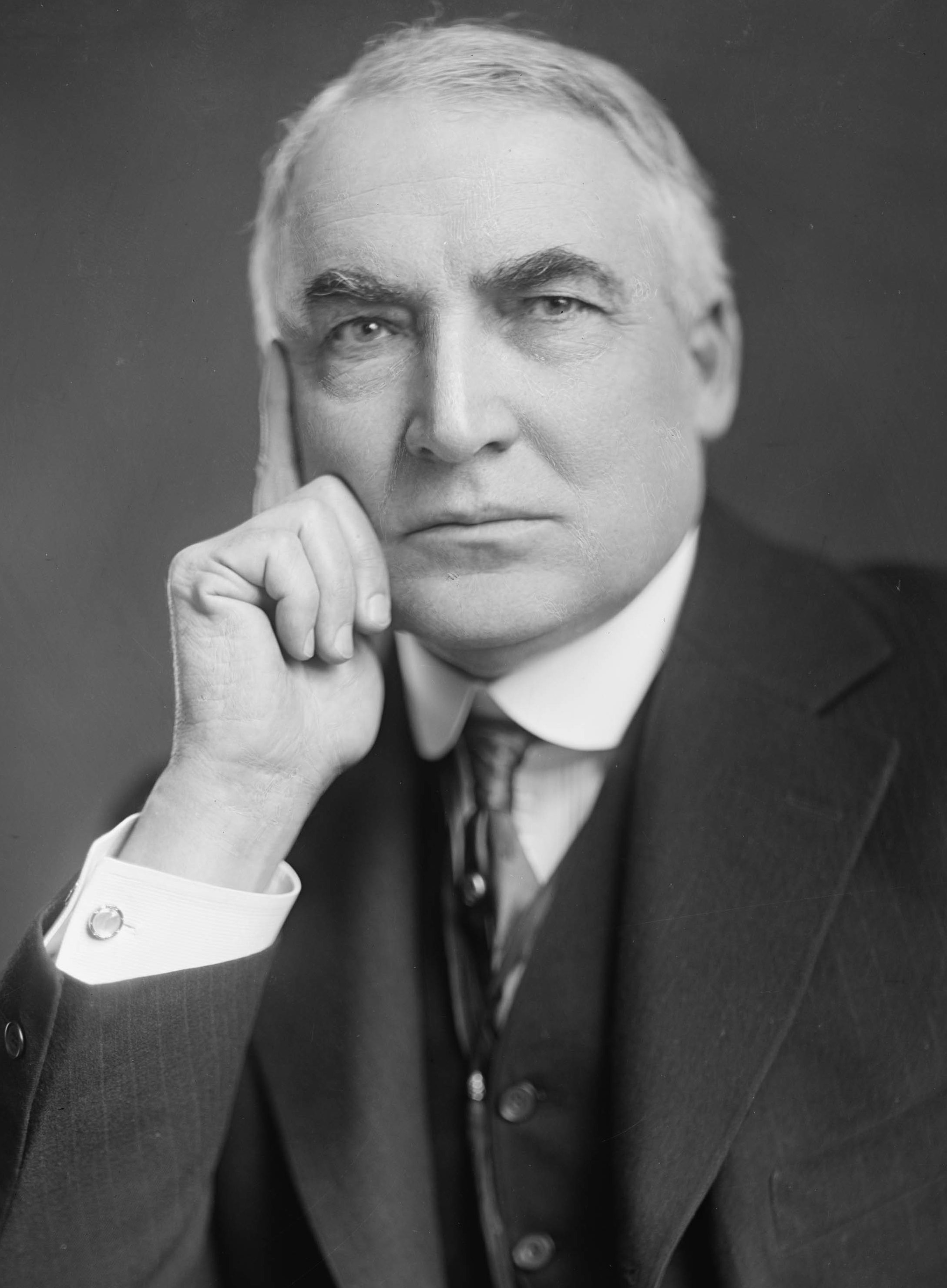

Nominee	Warren G. Harding	James M. Cox
Party	Republican	Democratic
Home state	Ohio	Ohio
Running mate	Calvin Coolidge	Franklin D. Roosevelt
Electoral vote	18	0
Popular vote	681,153	276,691
Percentage	68.55%	27.84%

Harding
50–60%
60–70%
70–80%
80–90%
90–100%
Cox
40–50%
50–60%
President before election
Woodrow Wilson
Democratic
Elected President
Warren G. Harding
Republican

The 1920 United States presidential election in Massachusetts took place on November 2, 1920, as part of the 1920 United States presidential election, which was held throughout all contemporary 48 states. Voters chose 18 representatives, or electors to the Electoral College, who voted for president and vice president.

Massachusetts was won in a landslide by Republican Senator Warren G. Harding of Ohio, who was running against Democratic Governor James M. Cox of Ohio. Harding's running mate was Governor Calvin Coolidge of Massachusetts, while Cox ran with Assistant Secretary of the Navy Franklin D. Roosevelt of New York. Also running that year was Socialist candidate Eugene V. Debs of Indiana and his running mate Seymour Stedman of Illinois.

Harding carried Massachusetts overwhelmingly with 68.55% of the vote to Cox's 27.84%, a Republican victory margin of 40.71%. Debs finished third, with 3.25%.

Massachusetts had long been a typical Yankee Republican bastion in the wake of the Civil War, having voted Republican in every election since 1856, except in 1912, when former Republican President Theodore Roosevelt had run as a Progressive candidate against incumbent Republican President William Howard Taft, splitting the Republican vote and allowing Democrat Woodrow Wilson to win Massachusetts with a plurality of only 35.53% of the vote. In 1916, the state had returned to the Republican column, although only by a fairly narrow 4-point margin.

With the deeply unpopular Democratic administration of Woodrow Wilson as the backdrop for the 1920 campaign, Warren G. Harding promised a "return to normalcy" that appealed to many voters, while Cox was tied to the policies of the Wilson administration, whose unpopularity was especially severe among Irish-Americans who saw Wilson as pro-Britain and against their independence. Harding won nationally in one of the most decisive landslides in American history, and Massachusetts, already a fiercely Republican state, went even harder for Harding than the nation, voting a solid 15% more Republican than the national average.

Harding was also helped in the state by his running mate, Calvin Coolidge, a traditional Yankee Republican born in neighboring Vermont and being the popular sitting Governor of Massachusetts.

Harding swept every county in the state of Massachusetts, including even Suffolk County, home to the state's capital and largest city, Boston. Boston had been a Democratic-leaning city prior to this, and while Calvin Coolidge would win the city once more for the GOP in 1924, Boston would defect to the Democrats for Catholic Al Smith in 1928 and become reliably Democratic in every election that followed. As Coolidge won Suffolk County with a plurality in 1924, 1920 thus remains the last election in which a Republican has won an absolute majority of the vote in Suffolk County.

In 13 of the state's 14 counties (all but Suffolk), Harding broke 60% of the vote, and in nine, Harding broke seventy percent. He even reached eighty percent in the island county of Dukes and peninsular Barnstable.

== Results ==
1920 United States presidential election in Massachusetts
Party	Candidate	Votes	Percentage	Electoral votes
Republican	Warren G. Harding	681,153	68.55%	18
Democratic	James M. Cox	276,691	27.84%	0
Socialist	Eugene V. Debs	32,267	3.25%	0
Socialist Labor	William Wesley Cox	3,583	0.36%	0
Write-ins	Write-ins	24	0.00%	0
Totals		993,718	100.00%	18

=== Results by county ===
County	Warren G. Harding Republican		James M. Cox Democratic		Eugene V. Debs Socialist		Various candidates Other parties		Margin		Total votes cast
County	#	%	#	%	#	%	#	%	#	%	Total votes cast
Barnstable	6,383	84.41%	1,125	14.88%	29	0.38%	25	0.33%	5,258	69.53%	7,562
Berkshire	20,138	63.11%	10,956	34.33%	703	2.20%	113	0.35%	9,182	28.77%	31,910
Bristol	56,734	73.65%	17,719	23.00%	2,179	2.83%	400	0.52%	39,015	50.65%	77,032
Dukes	1,013	86.73%	150	12.84%	3	0.26%	2	0.17%	863	73.89%	1,168
Essex	95,057	71.87%	30,560	23.11%	6,076	4.59%	571	0.43%	64,497	48.76%	132,264
Franklin	9,931	77.85%	2,542	19.93%	242	1.90%	42	0.33%	7,389	57.92%	12,757
Hampden	46,741	68.92%	19,156	28.25%	1,719	2.53%	204	0.30%	27,585	40.67%	67,820
Hampshire	13,174	70.10%	5,305	28.23%	286	1.52%	28	0.15%	7,869	41.87%	18,793
Middlesex	156,636	69.90%	61,661	27.52%	5,135	2.29%	646	0.29%	94,975	42.38%	224,078
Nantucket	608	74.51%	205	25.12%	3	0.37%	0	0.00%	403	49.39%	816
Norfolk	51,826	74.69%	15,720	22.66%	1,690	2.44%	149	0.21%	36,106	52.04%	69,385
Plymouth	33,582	73.54%	9,373	20.53%	2,561	5.61%	147	0.32%	24,209	53.02%	45,663
Suffolk	108,089	58.08%	67,552	36.30%	9,542	5.13%	915	0.49%	40,537	21.78%	186,098
Worcester	81,241	68.63%	34,667	29.29%	2,097	1.77%	367	0.31%	46,574	39.35%	118,372
Totals	681,153	68.55%	276,691	27.84%	32,265	3.25%	3,609	0.36%	404,462	40.70%	993,718

== See also ==
- United States presidential elections in Massachusetts
