= 1964 United States presidential election in Massachusetts =

Presidential Election

- November 3, 1964
- Turnout: 87.69% (▼4.04%)

Nominee	Lyndon B. Johnson	Barry Goldwater
Party	Democratic	Republican
Home state	Texas	Arizona
Running mate	Hubert Humphrey	William E. Miller
Electoral vote	14	0
Popular vote	1,786,422	549,727
Percentage	76.19%	23.44%

Johnson
40–50%
50–60%
60–70%
70–80%
80–90%
90–100%
Goldwater
50–60%
60–70%
Tie
40–50%
President before election
Lyndon B. Johnson
Democratic
Elected President
Lyndon B. Johnson
Democratic

The 1964 United States presidential election in Massachusetts took place on November 3, 1964, as part of the 1964 United States presidential election, which was held throughout all 50 states and D.C. Voters chose 14 representatives, or electors, to the Electoral College, who voted for president and vice president.

Massachusetts voted overwhelmingly for the Democratic nominee, incumbent President Lyndon B. Johnson of Texas, over the Republican nominee, Senator Barry Goldwater of Arizona. Johnson ran with Senator Hubert H. Humphrey of Minnesota, while Goldwater's running mate was Congressman William E. Miller of New York.

Johnson carried Massachusetts in a landslide, taking 76.19% of the vote to Goldwater's 23.44%, a Democratic victory margin of 52.75%. This made it the third-most Democratic state in the nation, after Rhode Island and Hawaii, and remains the strongest-ever Democratic showing in Massachusetts. Even in the midst of the nationwide Democratic landslide of that year, Massachusetts still weighed in as 30% more Democratic than the national average.

Massachusetts had been a Democratic-leaning state since 1928, but had voted Republican as recently as 1956, when Dwight Eisenhower won the state by 19 points. In 1960, Massachusetts native John F. Kennedy had carried the state with 60.22% of the vote, which up to that point was the strongest-ever Democratic showing in Massachusetts, but this record was quickly overtaken by Johnson in 1964.

The staunch conservative Barry Goldwater was widely seen in the liberal Northeastern United States as a right-wing extremist; he had voted against the Civil Rights Act of 1964, and the Johnson campaign portrayed him as a warmonger who as president would provoke a nuclear war. Thus, Goldwater performed especially weakly in liberal Northeastern states such as Massachusetts. Not only did Johnson win every Northeastern state—the first time that a Democratic presidential candidate had done so—but he won all of them with over 60% of the vote.

While Kennedy had won 60% in Massachusetts in 1960 mostly by garnering the ethnic Catholic vote, in 1964 the traditional Democratic coalition was joined by a mass defection of moderate Yankee Republicans who had voted for Eisenhower and Nixon but could not support Goldwater. Consequently, the incumbent Johnson was able to sweep the state—and indeed Goldwater wrote off this state and neighboring Connecticut, Rhode Island, and New York, as well as New Jersey, Pennsylvania and Michigan, from the beginning of his presidential campaign, prior to Kennedy's assassination.

== Results ==
1964 United States presidential election in Massachusetts
Party	Candidate	Votes	Percentage	Electoral votes
Democratic	Lyndon B. Johnson (incumbent)	1,786,422	76.19%	14
Republican	Barry Goldwater	549,727	23.44%	0
Socialist Labor	Eric Hass	4,755	0.20%	0
Prohibition	E. Harold Munn	3,735	0.16%	0
Write-ins	Write-ins	159	0.01%	0
Totals		2,344,798	100.00%	14
Voter turnout (voting age/registered)				70%/87%

=== Results by county ===
County	Lyndon B. Johnson Democratic		Barry Goldwater Republican		Various candidates Other parties		Margin		Total votes cast
County	#	%	#	%	#	%	#	%	Total votes cast
Barnstable	20,101	56.85%	15,133	42.80%	121	0.34%	4,968	14.05%	35,355
Berkshire	48,839	75.92%	15,160	23.57%	332	0.52%	33,679	52.35%	64,331
Bristol	146,885	78.70%	39,230	21.02%	521	0.28%	107,655	57.68%	186,636
Dukes	2,187	68.05%	1,015	31.58%	12	0.37%	1,172	36.47%	3,214
Essex	210,135	74.27%	71,653	25.32%	1,157	0.41%	138,482	48.95%	282,945
Franklin	17,106	66.76%	8,344	32.56%	174	0.68%	8,762	34.20%	25,624
Hampden	133,085	74.67%	44,299	24.86%	835	0.47%	88,786	49.81%	178,219
Hampshire	32,058	73.45%	11,385	26.09%	202	0.46%	20,673	47.36%	43,645
Middlesex	439,790	76.25%	134,729	23.36%	2,291	0.40%	305,061	52.89%	576,810
Nantucket	1,197	66.98%	587	32.85%	3	0.17%	610	34.13%	1,787
Norfolk	186,488	72.84%	68,612	26.80%	912	0.36%	117,876	46.04%	256,012
Plymouth	82,007	68.15%	37,941	31.53%	387	0.32%	44,066	36.62%	120,335
Suffolk	257,161	86.22%	40,251	13.50%	842	0.28%	216,910	72.72%	298,254
Worcester	209,383	77.08%	61,388	22.60%	860	0.32%	147,995	54.48%	271,631
Totals	1,786,422	76.19%	549,727	23.44%	8,649	0.37%	1,236,695	52.74%	2,344,798

==== Counties that flipped from Republican to Democratic ====
- Barnstable
- Dukes
- Franklin
- Nantucket
- Plymouth

== Analysis ==
Johnson swept every county in Massachusetts, the first time a Democratic presidential candidate had done so. This feat would not be repeated until 1992 (since which time, Democrats have swept every county in Massachusetts in every modern election). Johnson was the first Democrat ever to win Barnstable County, Dukes County, Franklin County or Plymouth County, and the first to carry Nantucket County since Woodrow Wilson in 1916. In Suffolk County, home to the state's capital and largest city, Boston, Johnson took 86.2% of the vote. Not until 2020 would any Massachusetts county again hand a presidential candidate more than 80% of the popular vote (on that occasion, Suffolk County to Joe Biden).

The election of 1964 remains the only one in which a Democratic presidential nominee has broken 70% of the vote in Massachusetts. Johnson's 76.19% remains the highest vote share any presidential candidate of either party has ever received in the state, and his 52.74% margin of victory is the widest margin by which any presidential candidate of either party has ever carried the state.

== See also ==
- United States presidential elections in Massachusetts
