= 2020 United States presidential election in Massachusetts =

- November 3, 2020
- Turnout: 76.00% ▲

Nominee	Joe Biden	Donald Trump
Party	Democratic	Republican
Home state	Delaware	Florida
Running mate	Kamala Harris	Mike Pence
Electoral vote	11	0
Popular vote	2,382,202	1,167,202
Percentage	65.60%	32.14%

Biden
40–50%
50–60%
60–70%
70–80%
80–90%
90–100%
Trump
40–50%
50–60%
President before election
Donald Trump
Republican
Elected President
Joe Biden
Democratic

The 2020 United States presidential election in Massachusetts was held on Tuesday, November 3, 2020, as part of the 2020 United States presidential election in which all 50 states plus the District of Columbia participated. Massachusetts voters chose electors to represent them in the Electoral College via a popular vote, pitting the Republican Party's nominee, incumbent President Donald Trump, and running mate Vice President Mike Pence against Democratic Party nominee, former Vice President Joe Biden, and his running mate California Senator Kamala Harris. Massachusetts has 11 electoral votes in the Electoral College.

Prior to the election, Massachusetts was widely considered a state Biden would win or a safe blue state. On election day, Biden easily carried Massachusetts with a 33-point margin, the largest margin whereby any nominee had carried the state since Lyndon B. Johnson's 1964 landslide. Massachusetts was one of three states where Biden won every county, the other two being Rhode Island and Hawaii.

Massachusetts voted 29% more Democratic than the national average.

== Primary elections ==
Presidential preference primaries were scheduled for March 3, 2020, for each of the political parties with state ballot access.

=== Democratic primary ===
Bernie Sanders and Joe Biden were among the declared major Democratic candidates. Elizabeth Warren, one of the two current senators from Massachusetts, formed an exploratory committee in December 2018 and declared her intention to run in February 2019.

2020 Massachusetts Democratic presidential primary
Candidate	Votes	%	Delegates
Joe Biden	473,861	33.41	37
Bernie Sanders	376,990	26.58	30
Elizabeth Warren	303,864	21.43	24
Michael Bloomberg	166,200	11.72	
Pete Buttigieg (withdrawn) (Note: Candidate withdrew after early voting started, but before the date of the election.)	38,400	2.71	
Amy Klobuchar (withdrawn)	17,297	1.22	
Tulsi Gabbard	10,548	0.74	
Deval Patrick (withdrawn)	6,923	0.49	
Tom Steyer (withdrawn)	6,762	0.48	
Andrew Yang (withdrawn)	2,708	0.19	
Michael Bennet (withdrawn)	1,257	0.09	
John Delaney (withdrawn)	675	0.05	
Marianne Williamson (withdrawn)	617	0.04	
Cory Booker (withdrawn)	426	0.03	
Julian Castro (withdrawn)	305	0.02	
All Others	1,941	0.14	
No Preference	5,345	0.38	
Blank ballots	4,061	0.29	
Total	1,418,180	100%	91

=== Republican primary ===
Massachusetts governor Charlie Baker declined to run, as did Utah Senator and former Massachusetts governor Mitt Romney.

2020 Massachusetts Republican presidential primary
Candidate	Popular vote		Delegates
Candidate	Count	Percentage	Delegates
Donald Trump (incumbent)	239,115	86.32	41
Bill Weld	25,425	9.18	0
Joe Walsh (withdrawn)	3,008	1.09	0
Rocky De La Fuente	675	0.24	0
No Preference	4,385	1.58	0
Blank ballots	2,242	0.81	0
All Others	2,152	0.78	0
Total	277,002	100%	41

=== Libertarian primary ===
2020 Massachusetts Libertarian presidential primary
- March 3, 2020

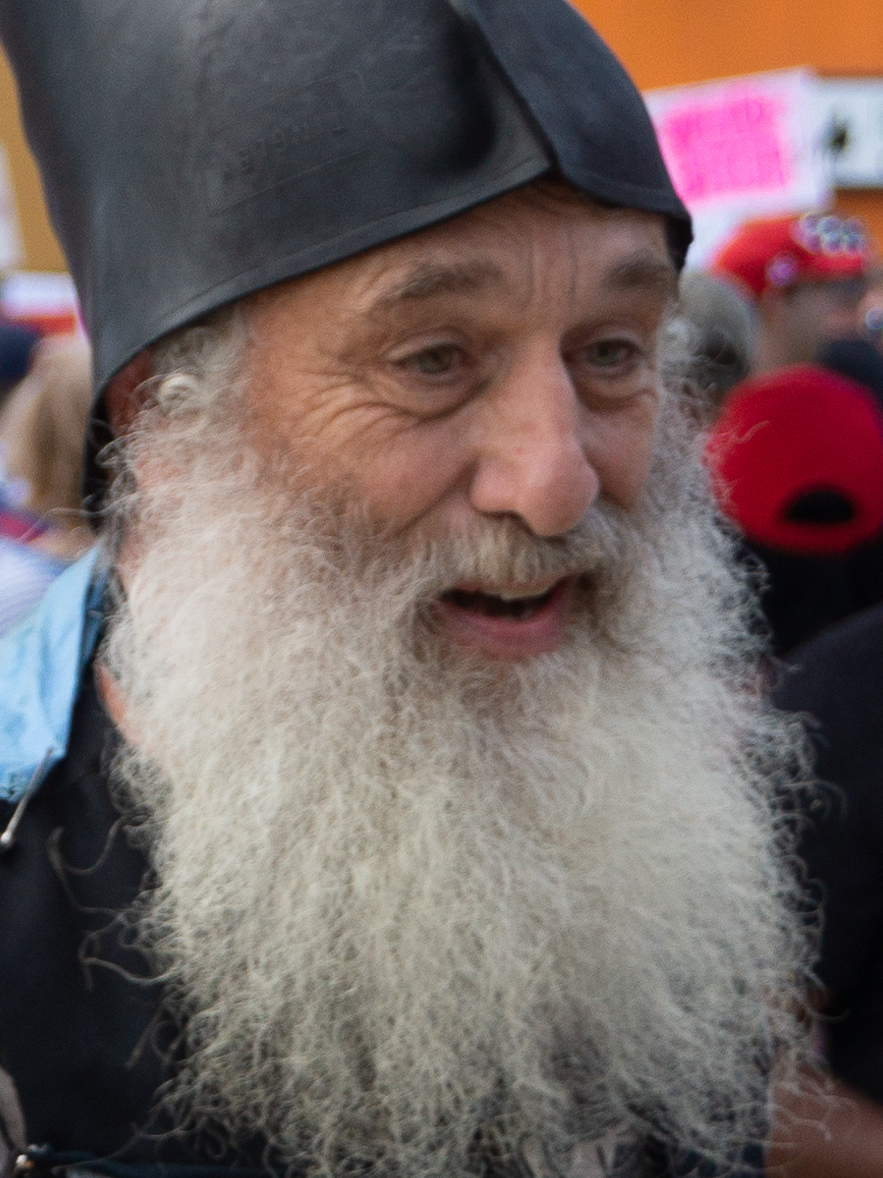

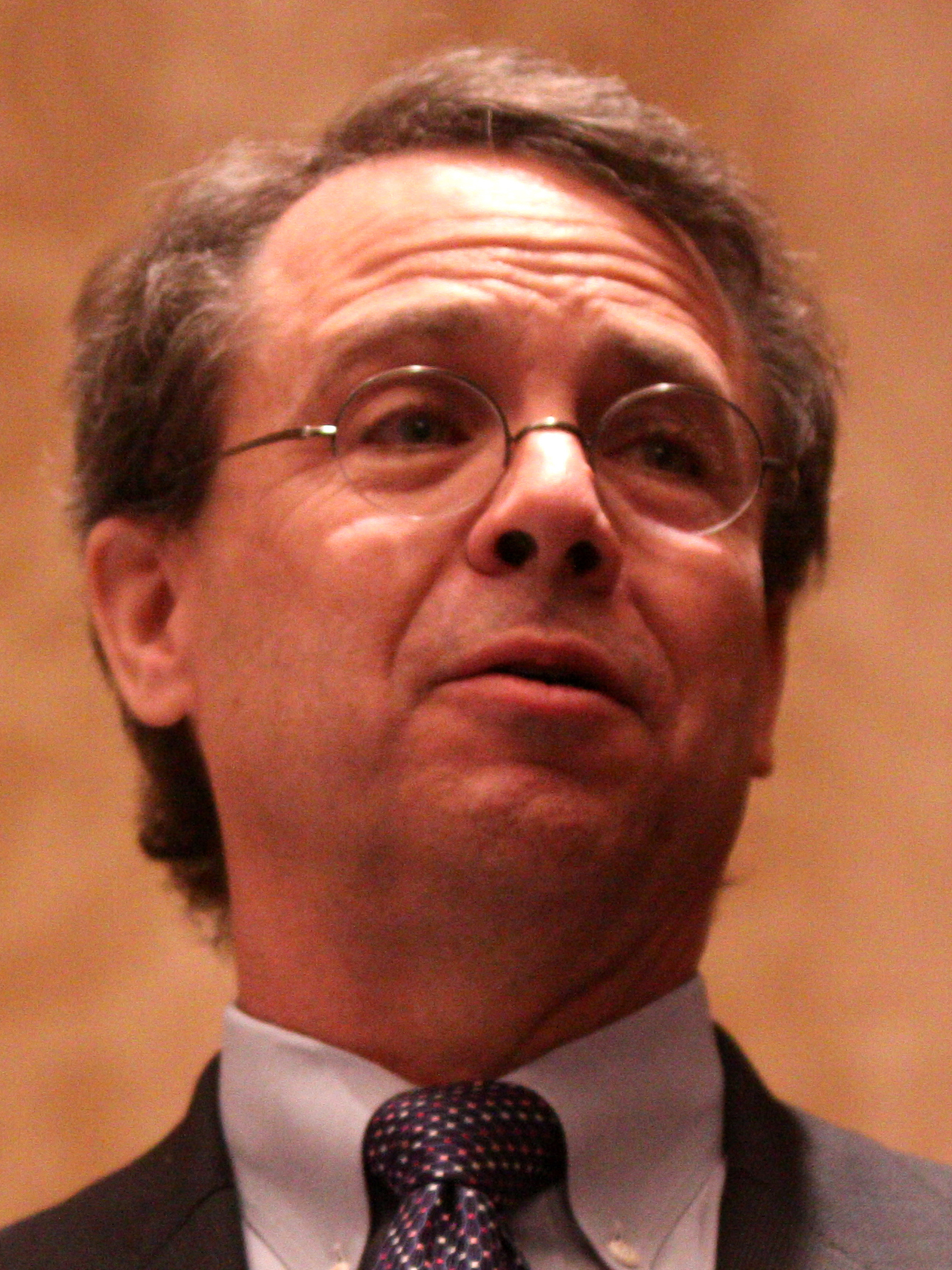

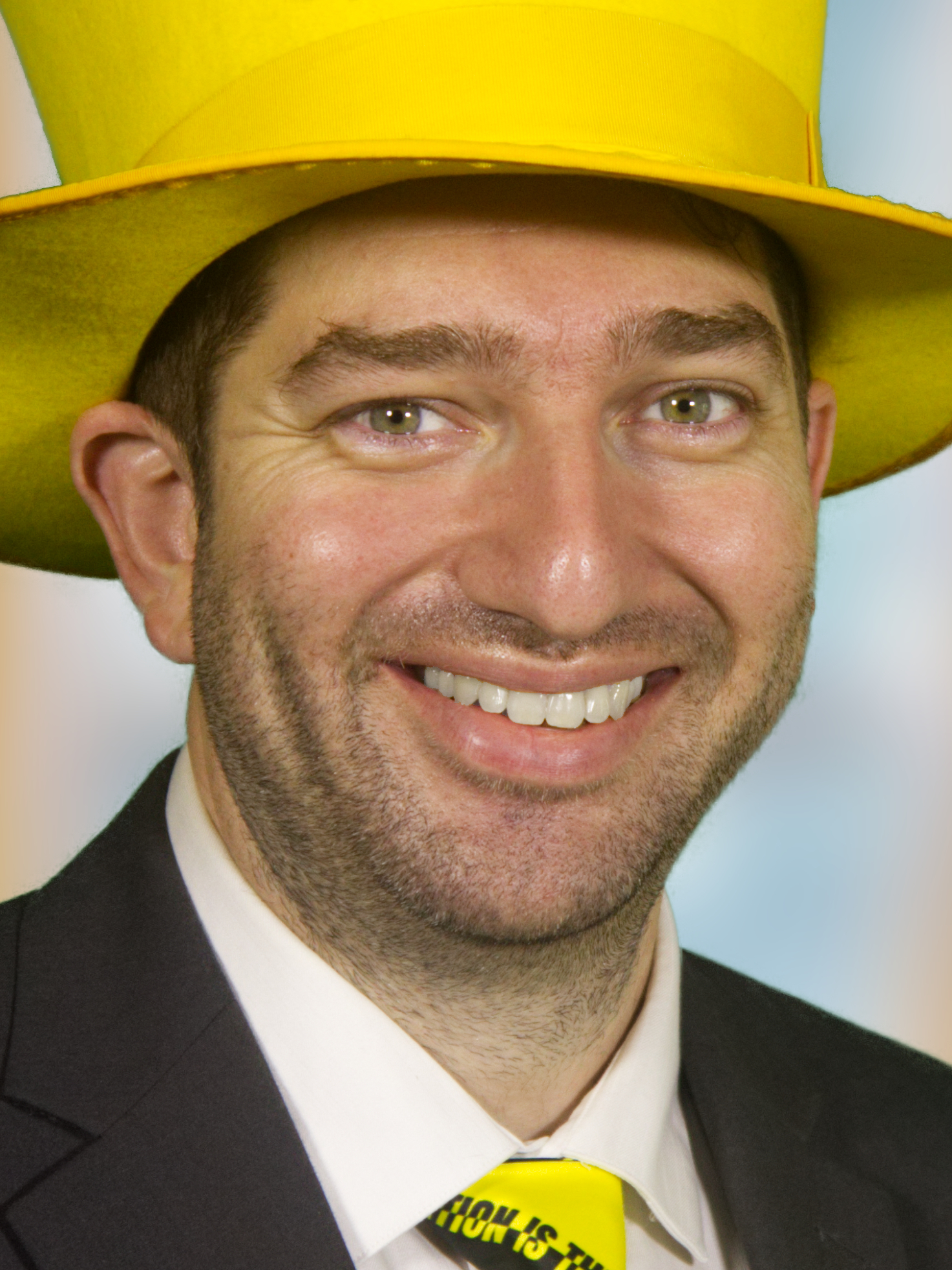

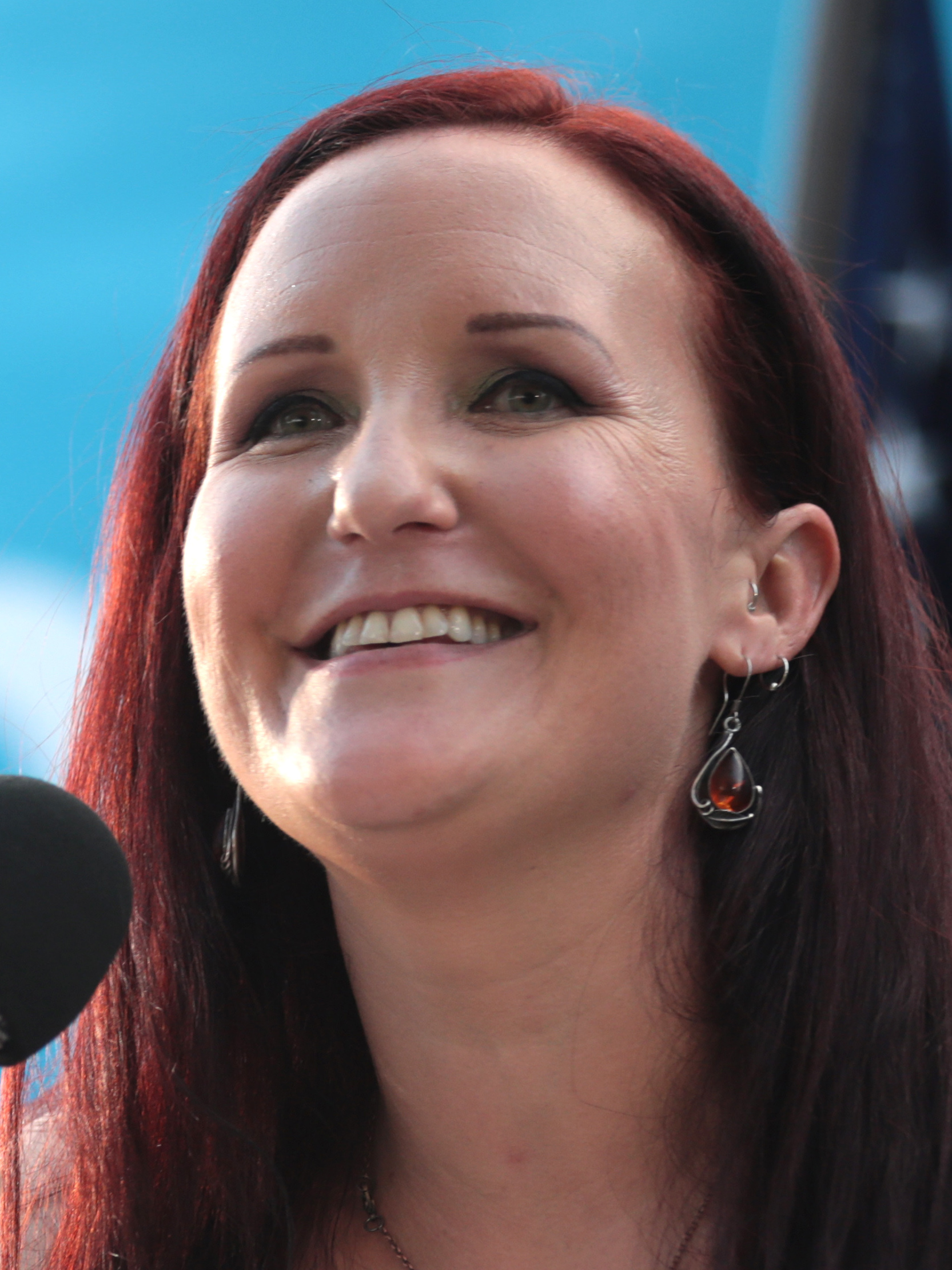
Candidate	Write-in (uncounted)	No preference	Vermin Supreme
Home state	Various	N/A	Massachusetts
Popular vote	958	804	398
Percentage	25.0%	21.0%	10.4%
Candidate	Jacob Hornberger	Dan Behrman	Kim Ruff (withdrawn)
Home state	Virginia	Nevada	Arizona
Popular vote	369	294	224
Percentage	9.6%	7.7%	5.8%
Election results by county (Note: Excluding write-ins, which were not tallied.)
No preference	Jacob Hornberger

A number of Libertarian candidates declared for the race, including New Hampshire State Representative Max Abramson, Adam Kokesh, Vermin Supreme and former Libertarian National Committee vice-chair Arvin Vohra.

Massachusetts Libertarian presidential primary, March 3, 2020
Candidate	Votes	Percentage
All others	958	25.0%
No preference	804	21.0%
Vermin Supreme	399	10.4%
Jacob Hornberger	369	9.6%
Dan Behrman	294	7.7%
Kim Ruff (withdrawn)	224	5.8%
Arvin Vohra	151	3.9%
Ken Armstrong	145	3.8%
Jo Jorgensen	141	3.7%
Sam Robb	127	3.3%
Adam Kokesh	125	3.3%
Max Abramson	98	2.6%
Total	3,835	100%

=== Green primary ===
Massachusetts Green Party presidential primary, March 3, 2020
Candidate	Votes	Percentage	National delegates
Dario Hunter	224	16.9	2
Howie Hawkins	217	16.4	1
Sedinam Kinamo Christin Moyowasifza-Curry	141	10.6	1
Kent Mesplay	55	4.1	0
David Rolde	4	0.3	0
Write-In	369	27.8	0
No Preference	316	23.8	7
Total	1326	100.00%	11

== General election ==
=== Predictions ===
Source	Ranking	As of
The Cook Political Report	Safe D	September 10, 2020
Inside Elections	Safe D	September 4, 2020
Sabato's Crystal Ball	Safe D	July 14, 2020
Politico	Safe D	September 8, 2020
RCP	Safe D	August 3, 2020
Niskanen	Safe D	July 26, 2020
CNN	Safe D	August 3, 2020
The Economist	Safe D	September 2, 2020
270towin	Safe D	August 2, 2020
ABC News	Safe D	July 31, 2020
NBC News	Safe D	August 6, 2020
538	Safe D	September 9, 2020

=== Polling ===
View source data.

Aggregate polls

Source of poll aggregation	Dates administered	Dates updated	Joe Biden Democratic	Donald Trump Republican	Other/ Undecided (Note: Calculated by taking the difference of 100% and all other candidates combined.)	Margin
270 to Win	October 17 – November 2, 2020	November 3, 2020	65.0%	28.7%	6.3%	Biden +36.3
RealClearPolitics	July 31 – August 27, 2020	September 15, 2020	64.0%	28.3%	7.7%	Biden +35.7
FiveThirtyEight	until November 2, 2020	November 3, 2020	64.6%	28.9%	6.5%	Biden +35.8
Average			64.5%	28.6%	6.8%	Biden +35.9

Polls

Poll source	Date(s) administered	Sample size (Note: Key: A – all adults RV – registered voters LV – likely voters V – unclear)	Margin of error	Donald Trump Republican	Joe Biden Democratic	Jo Jorgensen Libertarian	Howie Hawkins Green	Other	Undecided
MassInc	Oct 23–30, 2020	929 (LV)	–	28%	62%	-	-	8% (Note: "Some other candidate" with 5%; "Refused" with 3%; would not vote with no voters)	2%
SurveyMonkey/Axios	Oct 1–28, 2020	5,848 (LV)	–	28%	70%	-	-	–	–
YouGov/UMass Amherst	Oct 14–21, 2020	713 (LV)	–	29%	64%	-	-	3% (Note: "Other" with 3%; would not vote with 0%)	3%
SurveyMonkey/Axios	Sep 1–30, 2020	2,655 (LV)	–	32%	66%	-	-	–	2%
SurveyMonkey/Axios	Aug 1–31, 2020	2,286 (LV)	–	29%	69%	-	-	–	2%
Emerson College/WHDH	Aug 25–27, 2020	763 (LV)	± 3.5%	31%	69%	-	-	–	–
MassINC/WBUR	Aug 6–9, 2020	501 (LV)	± 4.4%	27%	63%	-	-	5% (Note: "Another candidate" with 2%; "Refused" with 3%)	4%
UMass/YouGov	Jul 31 – Aug 7, 2020	500 (RV)	± 5.9%	28%	61%	-	-	–	–
SurveyMonkey/Axios	Jul 1–31, 2020	2,509 (LV)	–	26%	72%	-	-	–	2%
MassINC	Jul 17–20, 2020	797 (RV)	–	23%	55%	-	-	10% (Note: "Some other candidate" with 7%; would not vote with 3%)	12%
SurveyMonkey/Axios	Jun 8–30, 2020	1,091 (LV)	–	27%	71%	-	-	–	2%
Emerson College/7 News	May 4–5, 2020	740 (RV)	± 3.5%	33% (Note: Including voters who lean towards a given candidate)	67%	-	-	–	–
University of Massachusetts Lowell/YouGov	Apr 27 – May 1, 2020	1,000 (RV)	± 3.6%	30%	58%	-	-	7% (Note: "Another candidate" with 7%)	4%
Emerson College	Apr 4–7, 2019	761 (RV)	± 3.5%	31%	69%	-	-	–	–

Former candidates

with Donald Trump and Bernie Sanders

Poll source	Date(s) administered	Sample size	Margin of error	Donald Trump (R)	Bernie Sanders (D)	Undecided
Emerson College	Apr 4–7, 2019	761 (RV)	± 3.5%	36%	64%	–

with Donald Trump and Elizabeth Warren

Poll source	Date(s) administered	Sample size	Margin of error	Donald Trump (R)	Elizabeth Warren (D)	Undecided
Emerson College	Apr 4–7, 2019	761 (RV)	± 3.5%	37%	63%	–

=== Results ===
2020 United States presidential election in Massachusetts
Party	Candidate	Votes	%	±%
Democratic	Joe Biden Kamala Harris	2,382,202	65.60	+4.62
Republican	Donald Trump Mike Pence	1,167,202	32.14	–0.67
Libertarian	Jo Jorgensen Spike Cohen	47,013	1.29	–2.93
Green	Howie Hawkins Angela Walker	18,658	0.51	–0.95
Write-in		16,327	0.45	–1.07
Total votes		3,631,402	100%	+1.49
Democratic win				

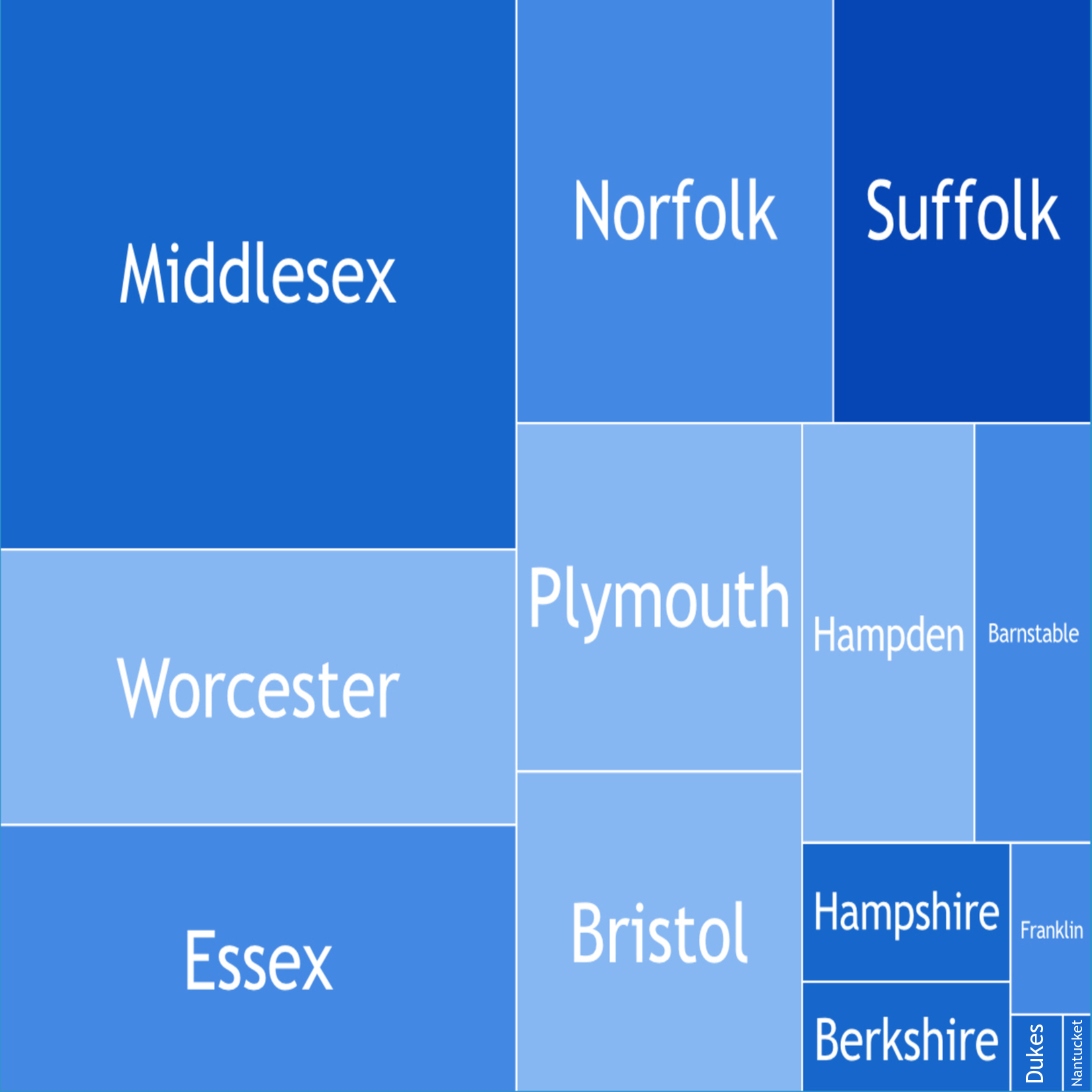
Treemap of the 2020 United States presidential election in Massachusetts. Biden: 50-60% 60-70% 70-80% 80-90%

==== By county ====
County	Joe Biden Democratic		Donald Trump Republican		Various candidates Other parties		Margin		Total votes cast
County	#	%	#	%	#	%	#	%	Total votes cast
Barnstable	91,994	61.20%	55,311	36.79%	3,020	2.01%	36,683	24.41%	150,325
Berkshire	51,705	72.44%	18,064	25.31%	1,606	2.25%	33,641	47.13%	71,375
Bristol	153,377	54.92%	119,872	42.92%	6,030	2.16%	33,505	12.00%	279,279
Dukes	9,914	77.47%	2,631	20.56%	253	1.97%	7,283	56.91%	12,798
Essex	267,198	63.44%	144,837	34.39%	9,175	2.17%	122,361	29.05%	421,210
Franklin	30,030	70.73%	11,201	26.38%	1,227	2.89%	18,829	44.35%	42,458
Hampden	125,948	57.73%	87,318	40.02%	4,911	2.25%	38,630	17.71%	218,177
Hampshire	63,362	72.12%	22,281	25.36%	2,211	2.52%	41,081	46.76%	87,854
Middlesex	617,196	71.47%	226,956	26.28%	19,425	2.25%	390,240	45.19%	863,577
Nantucket	5,241	71.74%	1,914	26.20%	151	2.06%	3,327	45.54%	7,306
Norfolk	273,312	67.03%	125,294	30.73%	9,145	2.24%	148,018	36.30%	407,751
Plymouth	173,630	57.53%	121,227	40.17%	6,959	2.30%	52,403	17.36%	301,816
Suffolk	270,522	80.64%	58,613	17.47%	6,327	1.89%	211,909	63.17%	335,462
Worcester	248,773	57.58%	171,683	39.74%	11,558	2.68%	77,090	17.84%	432,014
Totals	2,382,202	65.60%	1,167,202	32.14%	81,998	2.26%	1,215,000	33.46%	3,631,402

Municipalities that flipped from Republican to Democratic
- Ashburnham (Worcester)
- Athol (Worcester)
- Barre (Worcester)
- Bellingham (Norfolk)
- Billerica (Middlesex)
- Bridgewater (Plymouth)
- Bourne (Barnstable)
- East Longmeadow (Hampden)
- Granby (Hampshire)
- Groveland (Essex)
- Hanover (Plymouth)
- Hardwick (Worcester)
- Kingston (Plymouth)
- Lynnfield (Essex)
- Mendon (Worcester)
- Millbury (Worcester)
- Northbridge (Worcester)
- Orange (Franklin)
- Pembroke (Plymouth)
- Pepperell (Middlesex)
- Plainville (Norfolk)
- Plympton (Plymouth)
- Raynham (Bristol)
- Rowley (Essex)
- Royalston (Worcester)
- Rutland (Worcester)
- Salisbury (Essex)
- Saugus (Essex)
- Sterling (Worcester)
- Sutton (Worcester)
- Tewksbury (Middlesex)
- Townsend (Middlesex)
- Tyngsborough (Middlesex)
- Uxbridge (Worcester)
- Webster (Worcester)
- West Brookfield (Worcester)
- Westfield (Hampden)
- Westminster (Worcester)
- Whitman (Plymouth)
- Wilbraham (Hampden)

==== By congressional district ====
Biden won all nine congressional districts, breaking 60% of the vote in eight of them.

District	Trump	Biden	Representative
1st	37%	61%	Richard Neal
2nd	36%	61%	Jim McGovern
3rd	34%	63%	Lori Trahan
4th	34%	64%	Joe Kennedy III
4th	34%	64%	Jake Auchincloss
5th	24%	74%	Katherine Clark
6th	35%	62%	Seth Moulton
7th	13%	85%	Ayanna Pressley
8th	32%	66%	Stephen Lynch
9th	40%	58%	Bill Keating

== Analysis ==
Massachusetts has been a Democratic-leaning state since 1928, and a Democratic stronghold since 1960, and has maintained extremely large Democratic margins since 1996. This remained true in 2020, with Massachusetts being one of six states (along with Hawaii, Vermont, Maryland, California, and New York) to give Biden over 60% of the vote. Massachusetts is ethnically diverse, highly urbanized, highly educated, and among the least religious states.

Per exit polls by the Associated Press, Biden's strength came from winning 74% of college-educated voters, which carries particular weight in Massachusetts, as the state contains the highest proportion of graduates of any state in the country. Trump's slip among suburban white voters led Biden to carry almost every municipality in the Greater Boston area by at least 60% or more, while Trump carried only several towns on the South Shore and in Central Massachusetts. Biden won 298 of the 351 municipalities. Biden swept all demographic groups, garnering 63% of whites, 84% of Latinos, 58% of Catholics, 56% of Protestants, and 86% of Jewish voters. Additionally, Biden won 52% of whites without a college degree within the state, one of Trump's strongest demographics elsewhere in the country. While Biden overwhelmingly carried Latino voters in the state, Trump improved on his 2016 performance in heavily Hispanic cities such as Lawrence, Chelsea, and Holyoke. Nevertheless, Trump had the worst vote share in Massachusetts of any Republican nominee since Bob Dole in 1996, and slightly underperformed George W. Bush's 32.5% vote share in 2000.

Massachusetts was one of five states in the nation in which Biden's victory margin was larger than 1 million raw votes, the others being California, Maryland, New York and Illinois.

== See also ==
- 2020 Massachusetts general election
- United States presidential elections in Massachusetts
- 2020 United States elections
  - 2020 Democratic Party presidential primaries
  - 2020 Republican Party presidential primaries
  - 2020 Libertarian Party presidential primaries
  - 2020 Green Party presidential primaries
- 2020 United States elections
