= San Francisco values =

Pejorative term

"San Francisco values" is a term often used pejoratively and as an ad hominem phrase to refer to cultural, social and moral attributes associated with the city of San Francisco and California's liberal politics more generally. Often values and expressions that are less popular among social conservatives, such as LGBT equality or secular values, are invoked by users to frame their argument. The same values form the foundation of what is known as West Coast liberalism, though the political cultures of Los Angeles (and notably Hollywood), Seattle, Portland et cetera also contribute to this concept. This term, however, is not necessarily pejorative. For example, a liberal may identify as a "West Coast liberal" to distinguish themself from other similar ideologies (i.e. East Coast liberalism) or to emphasize the issues which are most important to them.

== Meaning ==
"San Francisco values" is used in a pejorative sense by conservative commentators to describe a secular progressive culture commonly associated with the city of San Francisco. The term has been associated with same-sex marriage, high minimum wages, anti-war activism, abortion-rights movements, marijuana decriminalization, and free migration.

== Media usage ==
The term "San Francisco values" was used by conservative pundits during the conservative movement of the mid-1990s, and has since been popularized by Bill O'Reilly and Newt Gingrich. It is possibly a successor to then-Democrat Jeane Kirkpatrick's condemnation of "San Francisco Democrats" for a "blame America first" mentality at the 1984 Republican National Convention (the Democrats had just held their convention in San Francisco). While O'Reilly claimed to have coined the term, it dates back at least to 1996, when Rep. Frank Riggs attacked his Democratic rival Michela Alioto over her "San Francisco values."

With the ascendancy of San Francisco representative Nancy Pelosi to Speaker of the House, the term experienced a surge in popularity following the 2006 midterm elections. Newt Gingrich, for example, sent a fundraising letter to supporters, saying, "Will everything you've worked so hard to accomplish be lost to the San Francisco values of would-be Speaker Nancy Pelosi?" Meanwhile, the Augusta Chronicle, a Georgia newspaper, warned readers that "Pelosi will be speaker and her far-left San Francisco values -- gay marriage, cutting and running from Iraq, coddling terrorists, raising taxes, amnesty for illegals -- will become the House agenda."

In addition to being used by some right-wing pundits, the term has appeared in and around San Francisco itself. The San Francisco Chronicle, San Francisco's largest daily newspaper, discussed the term in its 2006 article, "Three Dirty Words: San Francisco Values." The next week, the San Francisco Bay Guardian responded with a similarly titled article, "San Francisco Values," calling the Chronicle's editorial positions into question.

Congressman Sam Graves defeated challenger Kay Barnes in the 2008 election after airing two television ads. The first ad, dubbed "San Francisco Values," made use of a Barnes fundraising trip to U.S. Rep. Nancy Pelosi's California district. It featured a black man in a cowboy hat dancing in a bar with two women - one white, one black. The script suggested that Barnes, among other liberal sins, favored "abortion on demand."

== Positive usage ==
The Peter B. Collins Show, a syndicated liberal talk show no longer on the air, billed itself as a talk show "infused with dangerous 'San Francisco values' like compassion, justice, and a living wage".

San Francisco State University, the only public undergraduate university in San Francisco, California, in the absence of high-profile sports and traditional collegiate Greek life demonstrates a unique school spirit steeped in San Francisco values. Every graduate must complete the SF state studies component of their bachelor's degree that requires coursework in American ethnic and racial minorities, environmental sustainability, global perspectives and social justice. This broad-based progressive education is the university response to student activism going back more than 50 years, most notably with the Third World Liberation Front strikes of 1968, that resulted in the very first program and only College of Ethnic Studies.

== See also ==
- Massachusetts liberal
- Left Coast
- Liberal elite
- Limousine liberal
- Propaganda
- Stereotype
