= Massachusetts liberal =

Derogatory term used by Republicans

Percent of self-identified liberals by state in 2018, according to a Gallup poll. Massachusetts had one of the highest percentages. 32% and above 28–31% 24–27% 20–23% 16–19% 15% and under

Massachusetts liberal is a phrase in American politics which is generally used as a derogatory political epithet by Republicans against Democrats who are from the Commonwealth of Massachusetts. It was most significantly used in the 1988 presidential race by then–Vice President George H. W. Bush against Governor Michael Dukakis, and again in the 2004 presidential race by then–President George W. Bush against Senator John Kerry (who had been Dukakis's lieutenant governor). The Democratic presidential candidates (Dukakis, Kerry) lost both presidential races. In the Republican 2012 presidential primary election, Newt Gingrich used the phrase "Massachusetts moderate," based on the liberal pejorative, repeatedly against Mitt Romney, the former governor of Massachusetts, whose main residence was a mansion in the state. Romney went on to win the nomination, but lost the presidential election.

Massachusetts is one of the most liberal and Democratic-leaning states in the country. It was the first state where same-sex marriage became legal in 2004. It has the highest percentage of adults with college degrees of any state in the country.

== Meanings of the phrase ==
The 1972 Presidential election results; Massachusetts was the only state to vote for Democrat George McGovern

The idea behind the usage of the phrase is that the state of Massachusetts is "against the mainstream" in comparison to other states. Jane Elmes-Crahall, a professor who studies political rhetoric, has said, in swing and red states, "It [the phrase] still signals the antithesis of their [swing- and red-state] social and economic values." Hence, it is believed, voters in these states are unlikely to support a Democratic nominee that they believe to be a "Massachusetts liberal."

There are several specific ideologies that are implied in the phrase:

- Being "soft on crime"; specifically, an example of this was the infamous Willie Horton incident, which was referenced by George H. W. Bush's presidential campaign against Governor of Massachusetts Michael Dukakis in 1988. Willie Horton was a convicted murderer who raped a woman while on a furlough granted under Dukakis' administration.
- Alleged support for higher taxes. Among some, the state has a reputation for high taxes (6.25% sales tax, 5.05% income tax), and some refer to it as "Taxachusetts."
- Support for anti-war ideas. This particular inference comes from the 1972 presidential election, when Massachusetts was the only state where anti-war Senator George McGovern defeated President Richard Nixon.
- In more recent times, such as during the 2004 presidential race, the term also references the legalization of same-sex marriage in Massachusetts.

== See also ==
- Liberal elite
- Politics of Massachusetts
- San Francisco values
