= 1924 United States presidential election in Massachusetts =

- November 4, 1924
- Turnout: 56.6% ▲3.3 pp

Nominee	Calvin Coolidge	John W. Davis	Robert M. La Follette
Party	Republican	Democratic	Progressive
Home state	Massachusetts	West Virginia	Wisconsin
Running mate	Charles G. Dawes	Charles W. Bryan	Burton K. Wheeler
Electoral vote	18	0	0
Popular vote	703,476	280,831	141,225
Percentage	62.26%	24.86%	12.50%

Coolidge
40–50%
50–60%
60–70%
70–80%
80–90%
90–100%
Davis
40–50%
President before election
Calvin Coolidge
Republican
Elected President
Calvin Coolidge
Republican

The 1924 United States presidential election in Massachusetts took place on November 4, 1924, as part of the 1924 United States presidential election, which was held throughout all contemporary 48 states. Voters chose 18 representatives, or electors to the Electoral College, who voted for president and vice president.

Massachusetts was won in a landslide by incumbent Republican President Calvin Coolidge of Massachusetts, who was running against Democratic Ambassador John W. Davis of West Virginia and the Progressive Party's Senator Robert M. La Follette of Wisconsin. Coolidge's running mate was former Budget Director Charles G. Dawes of Illinois and Davis ran with Governor Charles W. Bryan of Nebraska, while La Follette ran with Senator Burton K. Wheeler of Montana. Wheeler was born in Hudson,Massachusetts.

Coolidge carried his home state overwhelmingly with 62.26% of the vote to Davis's 24.86%, a Republican victory margin of 37.41%. La Follette finished a strong third in the state with 12.50%.

Massachusetts had long been a typical Yankee Republican bastion in the wake of the Civil War, having voted Republican in every election since 1856, except in 1912, when former Republican President Theodore Roosevelt had run as a Progressive candidate against incumbent Republican President William Howard Taft, splitting the Republican vote and allowing Democrat Woodrow Wilson to win Massachusetts with a plurality of only 35.53% of the vote.

Calvin Coolidge, a traditional Yankee Republican born in neighboring Vermont, had served as a popular former Governor of Massachusetts, and thus easily was able to dominate the state on the presidential level. Even in the midst of the nationwide Republican landslide, Massachusetts weighed in as a solid 12% more Republican than the national average.

The 1920s were a fiercely Republican decade in American politics, and Massachusetts in that era was a fiercely Republican state in presidential elections. The economic boom and social good feelings of the Roaring Twenties under popular Republican leadership virtually guaranteed Calvin Coolidge an easy win in the state against the conservative Southern Democrat John Davis, who had little appeal in Northern states like Massachusetts. Coolidge won a strong majority statewide even with the Republican vote being split by the strong third party candidacy of Robert La Follette, a Republican Senator who ran as the Progressive Party candidate and peeled away the votes of many progressive Republicans.

Coolidge swept every county in the state of Massachusetts, and his 65.34% of the popular vote would prove to be his fifth strongest state in the 1924 election in terms of popular vote percentage after neighboring Vermont, Michigan, Maine and Pennsylvania. To date, this is the last time a Republican presidential candidate has carried every county in Massachusetts as well as the last election in which a Republican presidential candidate has won Suffolk County, home to the state's capital and largest city, Boston. No Republican has reached 60% of the vote since. It is also the last time that the towns of Hadley and Hatfield and the cities of Boston, Cambridge, Chelsea, Chicopee, Lawrence, and Revere voted Republican. From his time as governor, Coolidge remained relatively popular, for a Republican, among Irish Catholics and the other ethnic immigrant groups who populated Boston. Many of these voters would defect to the Democrats for Catholic Al Smith in 1928 and become reliable Democratic voters after that, making Boston a reliably Democratic city in every election that followed.

This was the last time Massachusetts voted for a Republican candidate until Dwight D. Eisenhower won the state in 1952. Until 2024, this was the last time that Fall River would vote Republican in a presidential election, and this remains the last time a Republican won a majority in Fall River.

== Results ==
1924 United States presidential election in Massachusetts
Party	Candidate	Votes	Percentage	Electoral votes
Republican	Calvin Coolidge (incumbent)	703,476	62.26%	18
Democratic	John W. Davis	280,831	24.86%	0
Progressive	Robert M. La Follette	141,225	12.50%	0
Communist	William Z. Foster	2,635	0.23%	0
Socialist Labor	Frank T. Johns	1,668	0.15%	0
Write-ins	Write-ins	2	0.00%	0
Totals		1,129,837	100.00%	18

=== Results by county ===
County	Calvin Coolidge Republican		John W. Davis Democratic		Robert M. La Follette Progressive		Various candidates Other parties		Margin		Total votes cast
County	#	%	#	%	#	%	#	%	#	%	Total votes cast
Barnstable	7,333	85.50%	881	10.27%	339	3.95%	24	0.28%	6,452	75.23%	8,577
Berkshire	21,106	58.93%	10,956	30.59%	3,637	10.15%	116	0.32%	10,150	28.34%	35,815
Bristol	58,929	66.23%	19,802	22.25%	9,624	10.82%	625	0.70%	39,127	43.98%	88,980
Dukes	1,182	86.91%	108	7.94%	69	5.07%	1	0.07%	1,074	78.97%	1,360
Essex	92,918	66.58%	25,635	18.37%	20,390	14.61%	607	0.43%	67,283	48.21%	139,550
Franklin	11,350	77.12%	2,089	14.19%	1,253	8.51%	25	0.17%	9,261	62.93%	14,717
Hampden	46,489	59.97%	19,079	24.61%	11,683	15.07%	264	0.34%	27,410	35.36%	77,515
Hampshire	13,918	66.23%	5,037	23.97%	2,014	9.58%	45	0.21%	8,881	42.26%	21,014
Middlesex	162,530	63.68%	64,544	25.29%	27,510	10.78%	651	0.26%	97,986	38.39%	255,235
Nantucket	708	79.64%	167	18.79%	12	1.35%	2	0.22%	541	60.85%	889
Norfolk	57,948	71.12%	15,014	18.43%	8,269	10.15%	247	0.30%	42,934	52.69%	81,478
Plymouth	34,728	68.97%	8,863	17.60%	6,549	13.01%	215	0.43%	25,865	51.37%	50,355
Suffolk	104,658	47.14%	78,702	35.45%	37,574	16.93%	1,059	0.48%	25,956	11.69%	221,993
Worcester	89,679	67.14%	31,171	23.34%	12,302	9.21%	424	0.32%	58,508	43.80%	133,576
Totals	703,476	62.26%	280,831	24.86%	141,225	12.50%	4,305	0.38%	422,645	37.40%	1,129,837

== See also ==
- United States presidential elections in Massachusetts
