= 1952 United States presidential election in Massachusetts =

- November 4, 1952
- Turnout: 94.89% (▲8.15%)

Nominee	Dwight D. Eisenhower	Adlai Stevenson
Party	Republican	Democratic
Home state	New York	Illinois
Running mate	Richard Nixon	John Sparkman
Electoral vote	16	0
Popular vote	1,292,325	1,083,525
Percentage	54.22%	45.46%

Eisenhower
50–60%
60–70%
70–80%
80–90%
90–100%
Stevenson
50–60%
60–70%
70–80%
Tie
~50%
President before election
Harry S. Truman
Democratic
Elected President
Dwight D. Eisenhower
Republican

The 1952 United States presidential election in Massachusetts took place on November 4, 1952, as part of the 1952 United States presidential election, which was held throughout all contemporary 48 states. Voters chose 16 representatives, or electors to the Electoral College, who voted for president and vice president.

Massachusetts voted for the Republican nominee, General Dwight D. Eisenhower of New York, over the Democratic nominee, former Governor Adlai Stevenson of Illinois. Eisenhower ran with the Senator Richard Nixon of California, while Stevenson's running mate was Senator John Sparkman of Alabama.

Eisenhower carried the state with 54.22% of the vote to Stevenson's 45.46%, a Republican victory margin of 8.76%.

As Eisenhower won a comfortable victory nationwide, Massachusetts still weighed in for this election as about 2% more Democratic than the national average.

Once a typical Yankee Republican bastion in the wake of the Civil War, Massachusetts, had been a Democratic-leaning state since 1928, when a coalition of Irish Catholic and other ethnic immigrant voters primarily based in urban areas turned Massachusetts and neighboring Rhode Island into New England's only reliably Democratic states. Massachusetts voted for Al Smith in 1928, for Franklin D. Roosevelt four times in the 1930s and 1940s, and for Harry S. Truman in 1948. However General Dwight Eisenhower, a war hero and moderate Republican who pledged to support and continue popular New Deal Democratic policies, was finally able to appeal to a broad enough coalition both to win back the White House and to flip Massachusetts back into the Republican column.

Eisenhower carried 13 of the state's 14 counties, Stevenson's only victory coming from urban Suffolk County, home to the state's capital and largest city, Boston.

This was the first time that Massachusetts was won by a Republican presidential candidate since 1924.

== Results ==
1952 United States presidential election in Massachusetts
Party	Candidate	Votes	Percentage	Electoral votes
Republican	Dwight D. Eisenhower	1,292,325	54.22%	16
Democratic	Adlai Stevenson	1,083,525	45.46%	0
Progressive	Vincent Hallinan	4,636	0.19%	0
Socialist Labor	Eric Hass	1,957	0.08%	0
Prohibition	Stuart Hamblen	886	0.04%	0
Write-ins	Write-ins	69	0.00%	0
Totals		2,383,398	100.00%	16

=== Results by county ===
County	Dwight D. Eisenhower Republican		Adlai Stevenson Democratic		Various candidates Other parties		Margin		Total votes cast
County	#	%	#	%	#	%	#	%	Total votes cast
Barnstable	20,943	80.64%	4,984	19.19%	44	0.17%	15,959	61.45%	25,971
Berkshire	38,413	56.13%	29,785	43.52%	243	0.36%	8,628	12.61%	68,441
Bristol	98,105	51.09%	93,444	48.67%	462	0.24%	4,661	2.42%	192,011
Dukes	2,432	76.05%	760	23.76%	6	0.19%	1,672	52.29%	3,198
Essex	156,030	55.64%	123,334	43.98%	1,045	0.37%	32,696	11.66%	280,409
Franklin	19,489	68.94%	8,729	30.88%	50	0.18%	10,760	38.06%	28,268
Hampden	98,641	51.86%	90,936	47.81%	616	0.32%	7,705	4.05%	190,193
Hampshire	24,141	58.19%	17,247	41.57%	98	0.24%	6,894	16.62%	41,486
Middlesex	316,069	56.99%	236,910	42.72%	1,626	0.29%	79,159	14.27%	554,605
Nantucket	1,490	78.55%	405	21.35%	2	0.11%	1,085	57.20%	1,897
Norfolk	140,409	65.20%	74,321	34.51%	631	0.29%	66,088	30.69%	215,361
Plymouth	67,922	67.22%	32,815	32.48%	305	0.30%	35,107	34.74%	101,042
Suffolk	162,147	40.05%	240,957	59.51%	1,775	0.44%	-78,810	-19.46%	404,879
Worcester	146,094	53.00%	128,898	46.76%	645	0.23%	17,196	6.24%	275,637
Totals	1,292,325	54.22%	1,083,525	45.46%	7,548	0.32%	208,800	8.76%	2,383,398

==== Counties that flipped from Democratic to Republican ====
- Berkshire
- Bristol
- Essex
- Hampden
- Hampshire
- Middlesex
- Worcester

== See also ==
- United States presidential elections in Massachusetts
