= 1916 United States presidential election in Massachusetts =

- November 7, 1916
- Turnout: 62.8% ▼0.6 pp
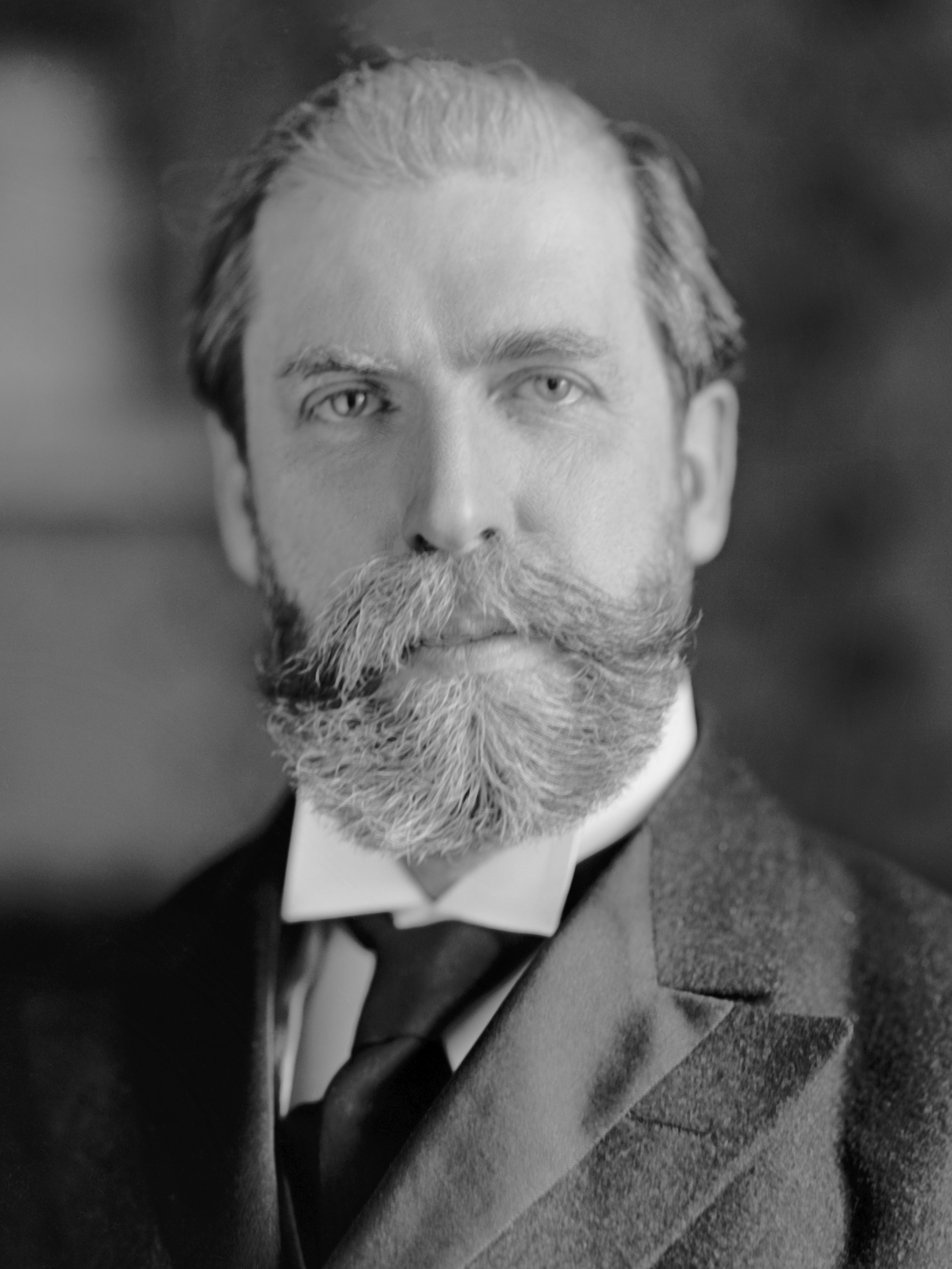

Nominee	Charles Evans Hughes	Woodrow Wilson
Party	Republican	Democratic
Home state	New York	New Jersey
Running mate	Charles W. Fairbanks	Thomas R. Marshall
Electoral vote	18	0
Popular vote	268,784	247,885
Percentage	50.54%	46.61%

Hughes
40–50%
50–60%
60–70%
70–80%
80–90%
90–100%
Wilson
40–50%
50–60%
60–70%
Tie
President before election
Woodrow Wilson
Democratic
Elected President
Woodrow Wilson
Democratic

The 1916 United States presidential election in Massachusetts took place on November 7, 1916, as part of the 1916 United States presidential election, which was held throughout all contemporary 48 states. Voters chose 18 representatives, or electors to the Electoral College, who voted for president and vice president.

Massachusetts was won by the Republican nominee, U.S. Supreme Court Justice Charles Evans Hughes of New York, and his running mate Senator Charles W. Fairbanks of Indiana. Hughes and Fairbanks defeated the Democratic nominees, incumbent Democratic President Woodrow Wilson and Vice President Thomas R. Marshall.

Hughes carried the state with 50.54%, to Wilson's 46.61%, a Republican victory margin of 3.93%. Coming in a distant third was Socialist candidate Allan L. Benson, who took 2.08%.

Massachusetts had long been a typical Yankee Republican bastion in the wake of the Civil War, having voted Republican in every election from 1856 through 1908. However, in 1912, former Republican President Theodore Roosevelt had run as a Progressive candidate against incumbent Republican President William Howard Taft, splitting the Republican vote and allowing Woodrow Wilson to win Massachusetts, becoming the first Democratic presidential candidate to do so, though with a plurality of only 35.53% of the vote. With the Republican base re-united behind Hughes in 1916, Massachusetts was returned to the Republican column.

Hughes won 12 out of 14 counties in the State of Massachusetts, while Wilson won only 2. The race was kept close statewide by the fact that Wilson carried Suffolk County, home to the state's capital and largest city, Boston. Wilson's only other county victory was the small island of Nantucket. However, both candidates had fair levels of support across the state, as neither got more than 60% of the vote in any county. As Wilson narrowly won re-election nationwide, Massachusetts ended up weighing in as about 7% more Republican than the national average. To date, this is the last time that the town of Granville voted Democratic.

As of 2024, Wilson remains the last Democrat to win the presidency without carrying Massachusetts.

== Results ==
1916 United States presidential election in Massachusetts
Party	Candidate	Votes	Percentage	Electoral votes
Republican	Charles Evans Hughes	268,784	50.54%	18
Democratic	Woodrow Wilson (incumbent)	247,885	46.61%	0
Socialist	Allan L. Benson	11,058	2.08%	0
Prohibition	Frank Hanly	2,993	0.56%	0
Socialist Labor	Arthur E. Reimer	1,097	0.21%	0
Write-ins	Write-ins	6	0.00%	0
Totals		531,823	100.00%	18

=== Results by county ===
County	Charles Evans Hughes Republican		Woodrow Wilson Democratic		Allan L. Benson Socialist		Frank Hanly Prohibition		Arthur E. Reimer Socialist Labor		Margin		Total votes cast
County	#	%	#	%	#	%	#	%	#	%	#	%	Total votes cast
Barnstable	2,836	58.68%	1,892	39.15%	39	0.81%	55	1.14%	11	0.23%	944	19.53%	4,833
Berkshire	9,787	52.09%	8,357	44.48%	484	2.58%	103	0.55%	58	0.31%	1,430	7.61%	18,789
Bristol	22,578	53.69%	18,065	42.96%	932	2.22%	332	0.79%	143	0.34%	4,513	10.73%	42,050
Dukes	464	58.96%	309	39.26%	9	1.14%	5	0.64%	0	0.00%	155	19.70%	787
Essex	35,909	50.51%	32,498	45.71%	2,093	2.94%	426	0.60%	169	0.24%	3,411	4.80%	71,095
Franklin	4,353	56.93%	3,054	39.94%	166	2.17%	60	0.78%	13	0.17%	1,299	16.99%	7,646
Hampden	18,207	50.19%	17,028	46.94%	761	2.10%	204	0.56%	77	0.21%	1,179	3.25%	36,277
Hampshire	5,748	56.15%	4,202	41.05%	190	1.86%	83	0.81%	13	0.13%	1,546	15.10%	10,236
Middlesex	60,802	53.77%	49,844	44.08%	1,660	1.47%	609	0.54%	151	0.13%	10,958	9.69%	113,072
Nantucket	249	44.15%	307	54.43%	6	1.06%	1	0.18%	1	0.18%	-58	-10.28%	564
Norfolk	19,284	58.71%	12,702	38.67%	615	1.87%	188	0.57%	55	0.17%	6,582	20.04%	32,844
Plymouth	13,515	52.48%	11,009	42.75%	1,041	4.04%	142	0.55%	45	0.17%	2,506	9.73%	25,752
Suffolk	42,492	40.03%	61,047	57.51%	1,998	1.88%	353	0.33%	258	0.24%	-18,555	-17.48%	106,148
Worcester	32,541	52.76%	27,540	44.65%	1,064	1.73%	432	0.70%	103	0.17%	5,001	8.11%	61,680
Absentee	19	32.20%	40	67.80%	0	0.00%	0	0.00%	0	0.00%	-21	-35.60%	59
Totals	268,784	50.54%	247,894	46.61%	11,058	2.08%	20,890	3.93%	2,993	0.56%	1,097	0.21%	531,832

== See also ==
- Summer Street Bridge disaster, which occurred in Boston on the evening of the election
- United States presidential elections in Massachusetts
