= 1928 United States presidential election in Massachusetts =

- November 6, 1928
- Turnout: 74.0% ▲17.4 pp

| Nominee | Al Smith | Herbert Hoover |
| Party | Democratic | Republican |
| Home state | New York | California |
| Running mate | Joseph T. Robinson | Charles Curtis |
| Electoral vote | 18 | 0 |
| Popular vote | 792,758 | 775,566 |
| Percentage | 50.24% | 49.15% |

Smith
40–50%
50–60%
60–70%
70–80%
Hoover
40–50%
50–60%
60–70%
70–80%
80–90%
90–100%
President before election
Calvin Coolidge
Republican
Elected President
Herbert Hoover
Republican

The 1928 United States presidential election in Massachusetts took place on November 6, 1928, as part of the 1928 United States presidential election, was held throughout all contemporary 48 states. Voters chose 18 representatives, or electors, to the Electoral College, who voted for president and vice president.

Massachusetts voted for the Democratic nominee, Governor Alfred E. Smith of New York, over the Republican nominee, former Secretary of Commerce Herbert Hoover of California. Smith's running mate was Senator Joseph Taylor Robinson of Arkansas, while Hoover's running mate was Senate Majority Leader Charles Curtis of Kansas.

Smith carried the state with 50.24% of the vote to Hoover's 49.15%, a Democratic victory margin of 1.09%. Socialist candidate Norman Thomas came in a distant third, with 0.40%. Massachusetts had long been a typical Yankee Republican bastion in the wake of the Civil War, voting Republican in every election from 1856, the first the Republican Party contested as such, through 1924, except in 1912, when former Republican President Theodore Roosevelt had run as a Progressive candidate against incumbent Republican President William Howard Taft, splitting the Republican vote and allowing Democrat Woodrow Wilson to win Massachusetts with a plurality of only 35.53% of the vote. As such, Hoover became the first Republican to win the presidency without carrying Massachusetts. This also marked the first time that the state would back a losing Democrat in a presidential election.

In 1920 and 1924, Republicans Warren G. Harding and Calvin Coolidge (the latter of whom had been governor of the state) had carried Massachusetts by landslide margins, sweeping every county in the state, including back-to-back GOP victories in the traditionally Democratic-leaning city of Boston. In 1924, Democrat John W. Davis of border state West Virginia had won only 24.86% of the vote in Massachusetts.

However, in 1928, the Democratic Party nominated Alfred E. Smith, a New York City-born Roman Catholic of Irish, Italian, and German immigrant heritage, who appealed greatly to the urban ethnic and Catholic immigrant populations that populated great American cities like New York and Boston. Smith was the first Catholic ever to be nominated for president on a major party presidential ticket, and while Smith's Catholicism greatly weakened his candidacy in many rural parts of the United States, especially in the South and the Pacific Northwest, Catholics across the United States identified with him greatly. Thus in 1928, a coalition of Irish Catholic and other ethnic immigrant voters primarily based in urban areas turned out massively in Smith's favor, making Massachusetts and neighboring Rhode Island the only states outside of the Solid South to vote Democratic. Smith won these two traditional Republican bastions even as Herbert Hoover won a third consecutive Republican landslide nationally.

== Results ==
1928 United States presidential election in Massachusetts
| Party | Candidate | Votes | Percentage | Electoral votes |
|---|---|---|---|---|
| Democratic | Alfred E. Smith | 792,758 | 50.24% | 18 |
| Republican | Herbert Hoover | 775,566 | 49.15% | 0 |
| Socialist | Norman Thomas | 6,262 | 0.40% | 0 |
| Communist | William Z. Foster | 2,461 | 0.16% | 0 |
| Socialist Labor | Verne L. Reynolds | 772 | 0.05% | 0 |
| Write-ins | Write-ins | 4 | 0.00% | 0 |
| Totals | | 1,577,823 | 100.00% | 18 |

=== Results by county ===
| County | Al Smith Democratic | | Herbert Hoover Republican | | Other candidates Various parties | | Margin | | Total votes cast |
| County | # | % | # | % | # | % | # | % | Total votes cast |
|---|---|---|---|---|---|---|---|---|---|
| Barnstable | 2,899 | 22.57% | 9,886 | 76.96% | 60 | 0.47% | -6,987 | -54.39% | 12,845 |
| Berkshire | 24,075 | 49.98% | 23,855 | 49.52% | 244 | 0.51% | 220 | 0.46% | 48,174 |
| Bristol | 59,257 | 51.19% | 55,205 | 47.69% | 1,293 | 1.12% | 4,052 | 3.50% | 115,755 |
| Dukes | 470 | 24.00% | 1,487 | 75.94% | 1 | 0.05% | -1,017 | -51.94% | 1,958 |
| Essex | 89,508 | 46.42% | 102,008 | 52.91% | 1,294 | 0.67% | -12,500 | -6.49% | 192,810 |
| Franklin | 5,842 | 28.74% | 14,333 | 70.52% | 149 | 0.73% | -8,491 | -41.78% | 20,324 |
| Hampden | 62,056 | 52.23% | 56,063 | 47.18% | 703 | 0.59% | 5,993 | 5.05% | 118,822 |
| Hampshire | 12,695 | 46.93% | 14,101 | 52.13% | 255 | 0.94% | -1,406 | -5.20% | 27,051 |
| Middlesex | 173,339 | 47.64% | 189,189 | 52.00% | 1,313 | 0.36% | -15,850 | -4.36% | 363,841 |
| Nantucket | 395 | 31.32% | 865 | 68.60% | 1 | 0.08% | -470 | -37.28% | 1,261 |
| Norfolk | 47,057 | 38.87% | 73,530 | 60.73% | 489 | 0.40% | -26,473 | -21.86% | 121,076 |
| Plymouth | 24,887 | 37.27% | 41,362 | 61.95% | 517 | 0.77% | -16,475 | -24.68% | 66,766 |
| Suffolk | 204,603 | 66.84% | 99,392 | 32.47% | 2,135 | 0.70% | 105,211 | 34.37% | 306,130 |
| Worcester | 85,675 | 47.33% | 94,290 | 52.09% | 1,045 | 0.58% | -8,615 | -4.76% | 181,010 |
| Totals | 792,758 | 50.24% | 775,566 | 49.15% | 9,499 | 0.61% | 17,192 | 1.09% | 1,577,823 |

== Analysis ==
After 1912, 1928 was only the second time in history that Massachusetts had voted Democratic, and with 50.24% of the vote, Al Smith became the first Democratic presidential candidate ever to win a majority of the vote in Massachusetts. In every previous election, Massachusetts had always voted more Republican than the nation as a whole. However, in 1928, with Hoover winning a landslide nationally, Smith's victory made Massachusetts a whopping 18% more Democratic than the national average. While Smith won the state's electoral votes, Massachusetts was still closely divided between the newly emerging Democratic majority coalition, and its traditional New England Republican roots. Combined with the fact that the country was experiencing an economic boom and the social good feelings of the Roaring Twenties under popular Republican leadership, the result in Massachusetts was still very close, with 49% voting to keep the Republicans in power with Herbert Hoover.

With Al Smith's base of support packed in heavily populated urban areas, he won the state despite carrying only 4 of the state's 14 counties. The most vital component to Smith's victory was the Democratic dominance in Suffolk County, home to the state's capital and largest city, Boston. Smith took over 60% of the vote in Suffolk County. Another crucial victory for Smith was in Hampden County, home to the city of Springfield. He was the first Democrat to win here since 1852. The remaining 2 counties that went to Smith were Bristol County, south of the Boston area, and rural Berkshire County in the far west of the state. Smith was the first Democrat to win these counties since James Knox Polk in 1844.

Hoover became the first Republican elected president without carrying Massachusetts, as well as Hampden, Bristol, or Berkshire counties. Smith's victory would transform Massachusetts almost instantly into a Democratic-leaning state, and 1928 was the first of 6 consecutive Democratic victories in the state, as no Republican would win the state again until Dwight D. Eisenhower in 1952. Smith's win in Boston's Suffolk County would be the start of a Democratic winning streak there that has never been broken since, as Boston became one of the most Democratic cities in the country, and a major obstacle to overcome for any Republican looking to compete in Massachusetts. The results of 1928 would foreshadow the future political direction of the state, culminating in 1960, when favorite son Senator John F. Kennedy would become the second Catholic to be nominated for president by the Democratic Party and would solidify Massachusetts as a Democratic stronghold in the modern era.

== See also ==
- United States presidential elections in Massachusetts
