= 1912 United States presidential election in Massachusetts =

- November 5, 1912
- Turnout: 63.4% ▼1.7 pp

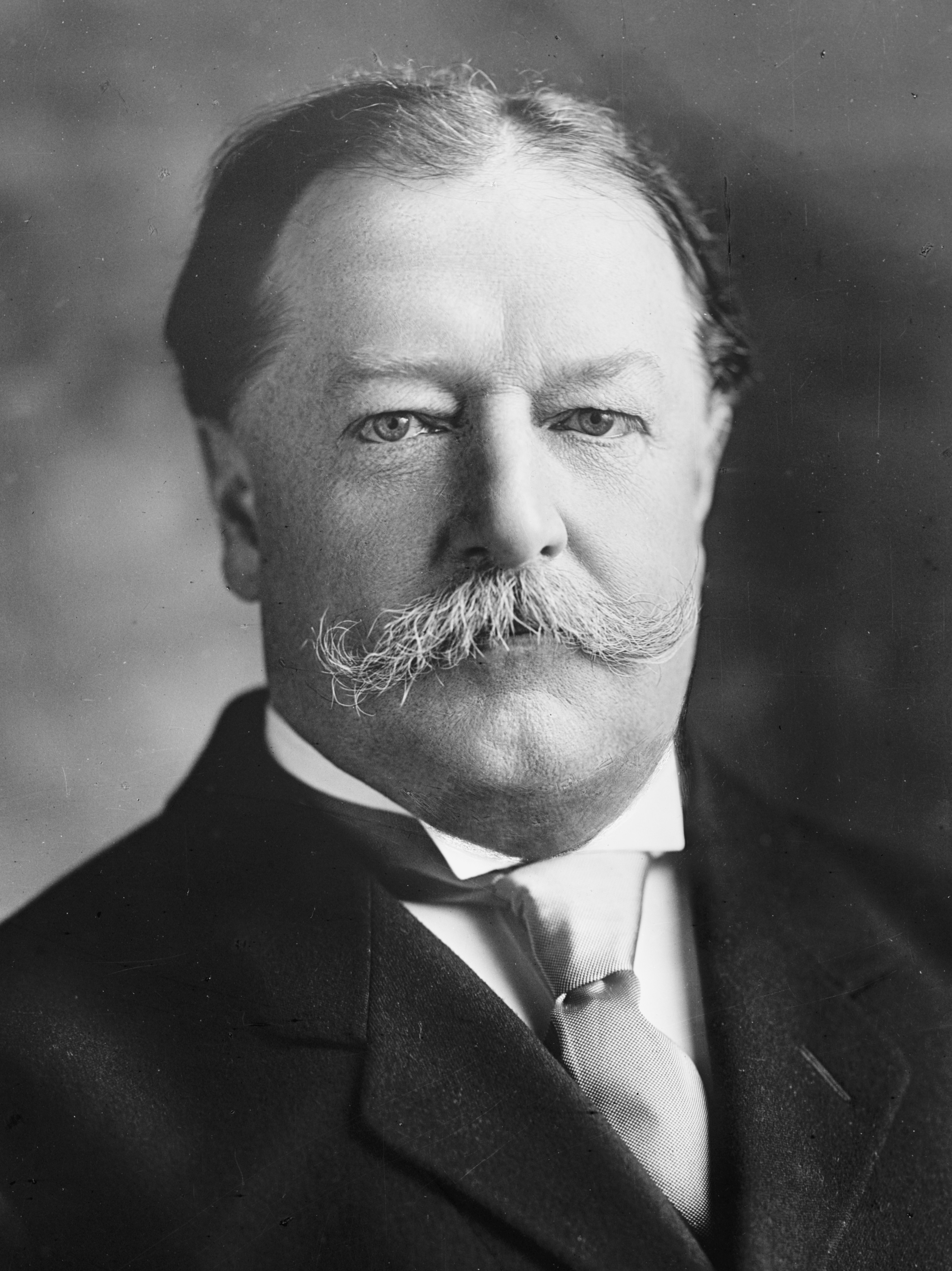

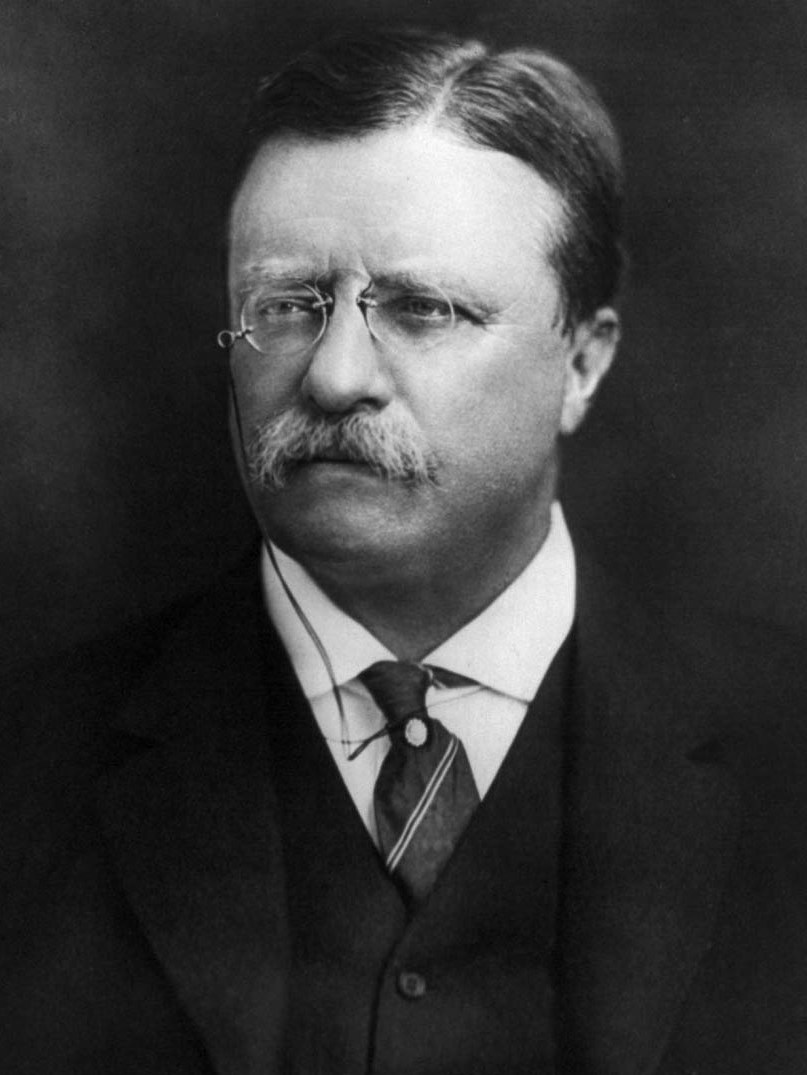
Nominee	Woodrow Wilson	William Howard Taft	Theodore Roosevelt
Party	Democratic	Republican	Progressive
Home state	New Jersey	Ohio	New York
Running mate	Thomas R. Marshall	Nicholas Murray Butler	Hiram Johnson
Electoral vote	18	0	0
Popular vote	173,408	155,948	142,228
Percentage	35.53%	31.95%	29.14%

Wilson
30–40%
40–50%
50–60%
60–70%
Taft
30–40%
40–50%
50–60%
60–70%
70–80%
Roosevelt
30–40%
40–50%
50–60%
60–70%
70–80%
Tie
30–40%
40–50%
President before election
William Howard Taft
Republican
Elected President
Woodrow Wilson
Democratic

The 1912 United States presidential election in Massachusetts took place on November 5, 1912, as part of the 1912 United States presidential election, which was held throughout all contemporary 48 states. Voters chose 18 representatives, or electors to the Electoral College, who voted for president and vice president.

Massachusetts was won by the Democratic nominees, New Jersey Governor Woodrow Wilson and his running mate, Indiana Governor Thomas R. Marshall, marking the first time in history that the state had backed a Democrat for president. Opposing him were the Republican nominees, incumbent President William Howard Taft and Vice President James S. Sherman, and the Progressive Party candidates, former President Theodore Roosevelt and his running mate California Governor Hiram Johnson. Also in the running was the Socialist Party candidate, Eugene V. Debs, who ran with Emil Seidel.

Wilson won Massachusetts with a plurality of 35.53% of the vote, Taft came in second, with 31.95%, and Roosevelt came in third, with 29.14%, Wilson's margin over Taft being 3.58%. Debs came in fourth, with 2.58% of the total vote. In terms of margin, Massachusetts was about 11% more Republican than the national average.

Massachusetts had long been a typical Yankee Republican bastion in the wake of the Civil War, having voted Republican in every election from 1856 through 1908. However, in 1912, former Republican President Theodore Roosevelt decided to run as a third-party candidate with his Bull Moose Party against incumbent Republican President William Howard Taft, splitting the Republican vote and allowing Woodrow Wilson as the Democratic candidate to win Massachusetts with a plurality of only 35.53% of the vote. Were Taft and Roosevelt voters united behind a single Republican candidate, they would have taken a combined majority of over 61% of the vote, but the split would instead prove fatal to the Republicans both nationally and in Massachusetts. As a result of Wilson's win, 1912 marked the first time in history that Massachusetts had ever given its electoral votes to a Democratic presidential candidate.

Theodore Roosevelt finished strong for a third-party candidate with 29.14% of the vote, about 2% more than he received nationally, although Massachusetts was not amongst his strongest states. Nonetheless, Roosevelt's performance remains as of 2020 the best-ever third-party presidential performance in Massachusetts. The state's traditional Republican voters, especially in rural Western Massachusetts, proved to be mostly loyal to President Taft as the official Republican nominee. While Roosevelt came in second place nationally ahead of Taft, in Massachusetts, Taft beat Roosevelt and finished second behind Wilson.

== Results ==
1912 United States presidential election in Massachusetts
Party	Candidate	Votes	Percentage	Electoral votes
Democratic	Woodrow Wilson	173,408	35.53%	18
Republican	William Howard Taft (incumbent)	155,948	31.95%	0
Progressive	Theodore Roosevelt	142,228	29.14%	0
Socialist	Eugene V. Debs	12,616	2.58%	0
Prohibition	Eugene W. Chafin	2,754	0.56%	0
Socialist Labor	Arthur E. Reimer	1,102	0.23%	0
Write-ins	Write-ins	1	0.00%	0
Totals		488,057	100.00%	18

=== Results by county ===
County	Woodrow Wilson Democratic		William H. Taft Republican		Theodore Roosevelt Progressive "Bull Moose"		Eugene Debs Socialist		Eugene Chafin Prohibition		Arthur Reimer Socialist Labor		Margin		Total votes cast
County	#	%	#	%	#	%	#	%	#	%	#	%	#	%	Total votes cast
Barnstable	1,322	26.57%	1,249	25.11%	2,315	46.53%	20	0.40%	67	1.35%	2	0.04%	-993	-19.96%	4,975
Berkshire	6,211	36.10%	6,397	37.19%	3,809	22.14%	598	3.48%	124	0.72%	64	0.37%	-186	-1.09%	17,203
Bristol	12,420	32.72%	13,279	34.98%	10,630	28.00%	1,118	2.94%	377	0.99%	139	0.37%	-859	-2.26%	37,963
Dukes	215	27.78%	269	34.75%	278	35.92%	1	0.13%	11	1.42%	0	0.00%	-9	-1.17%	774
Essex	20,691	31.05%	21,441	32.17%	21,098	31.66%	2,716	4.08%	444	0.67%	249	0.37%	-343	-0.51%	66,639
Franklin	2,046	28.00%	2,636	36.08%	2,268	31.04%	269	3.68%	73	1.00%	14	0.19%	-368	-5.04%	7,306
Hampden	10,620	34.91%	11,393	37.45%	7,099	23.34%	1,094	3.60%	132	0.43%	84	0.28%	-773	-2.54%	30,423
Hampshire	3,088	32.06%	4,512	46.84%	1,606	16.67%	292	3.03%	112	1.16%	22	0.23%	-1,424	-14.78%	9,632
Middlesex	36,689	35.67%	30,511	29.66%	33,517	32.58%	1,530	1.49%	446	0.43%	174	0.17%	3,172	3.09%	102,867
Nantucket	247	43.79%	123	21.81%	194	34.40%	0	0.00%	0	0.00%	0	0.00%	53	9.39%	564
Norfolk	9,244	31.41%	9,650	32.79%	9,779	33.23%	609	2.07%	101	0.34%	48	0.16%	-129	-0.44%	29,431
Plymouth	6,991	29.56%	5,590	23.63%	9,645	40.78%	1,216	5.14%	171	0.72%	40	0.17%	-2,654	-11.22%	23,653
Suffolk	46,059	47.07%	24,179	24.71%	24,977	25.53%	2,155	2.20%	299	0.31%	182	0.19%	21,082	21.54%	97,851
Worcester	17,565	29.88%	24,719	42.06%	15,013	25.54%	998	1.70%	397	0.68%	84	0.14%	-7,154	-12.18%	58,776
Totals	174,208	35.64%	155,948	31.90%	142,228	29.09%	12,616	2.58%	2,754	0.56%	1,102	0.23%	18,260	3.74%	488,856

== Analysis ==
Taft carried the most counties in Massachusetts, winning 6 of the state's 14 counties, while Wilson and Roosevelt each took 4. Taft's support was strongest in Western and Central Massachusetts, his most significant win being Worcester County, where he won with over 40% of the vote. Roosevelt was strongest in the southeast part of the state, his overall most significant win being Plymouth County, where he won with over 40% of the vote. Roosevelt's most populous county win was Norfolk County, although he only won it with a plurality of less than forty percent of the vote.

However, Wilson was able to edge them out statewide by holding on to the Democratic base of support in the cities. Wilson's most important county victory by far was winning Suffolk County, home to the state's capital and largest city, Boston, winning it with over 40% of the vote. Wilson also won heavily populated Middlesex County with a plurality of less than 40% of the vote.

While, due to vote-splitting, Massachusetts finally voted Democratic for the first time ever in 1912, this was not indicative of any long-term trend at the time. With the Republican base re-united in 1916, Massachusetts returned to the Republican column and remained solidly Republican until the 1928 election.

== See also ==
- United States presidential elections in Massachusetts
