= 1856 United States presidential election in Massachusetts =

- November 4, 1856
- Turnout: 69.8% ▲12.0 pp
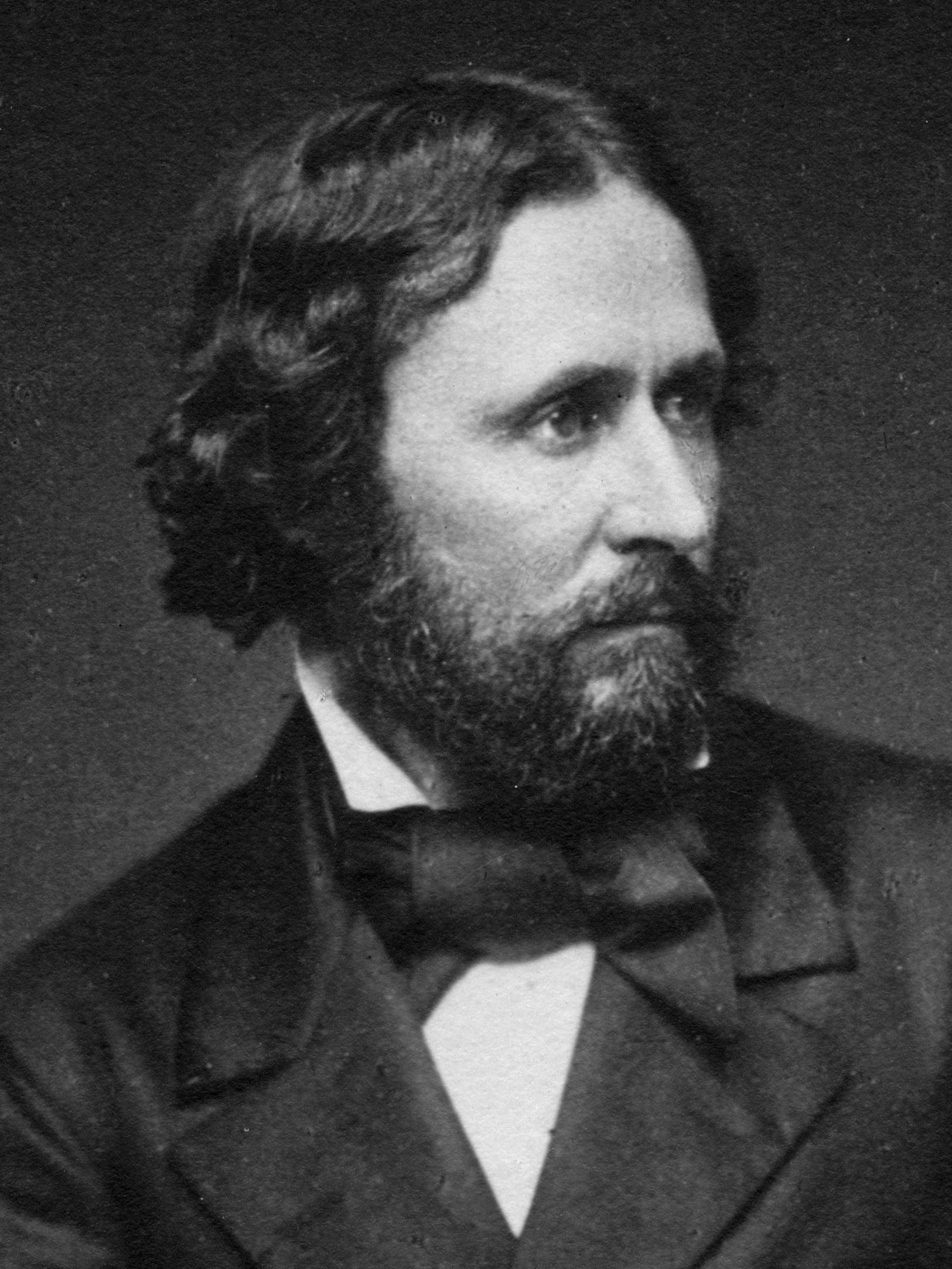

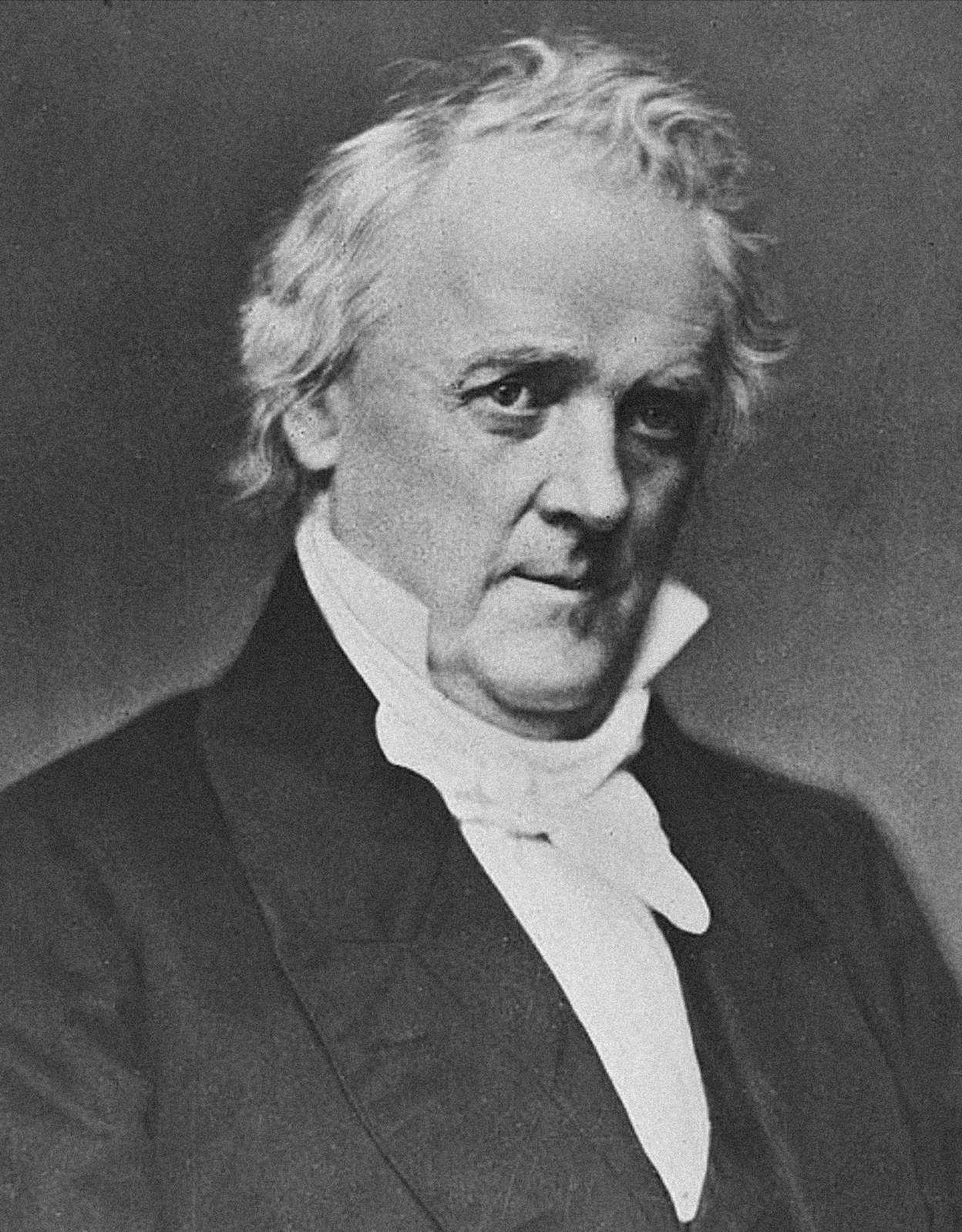

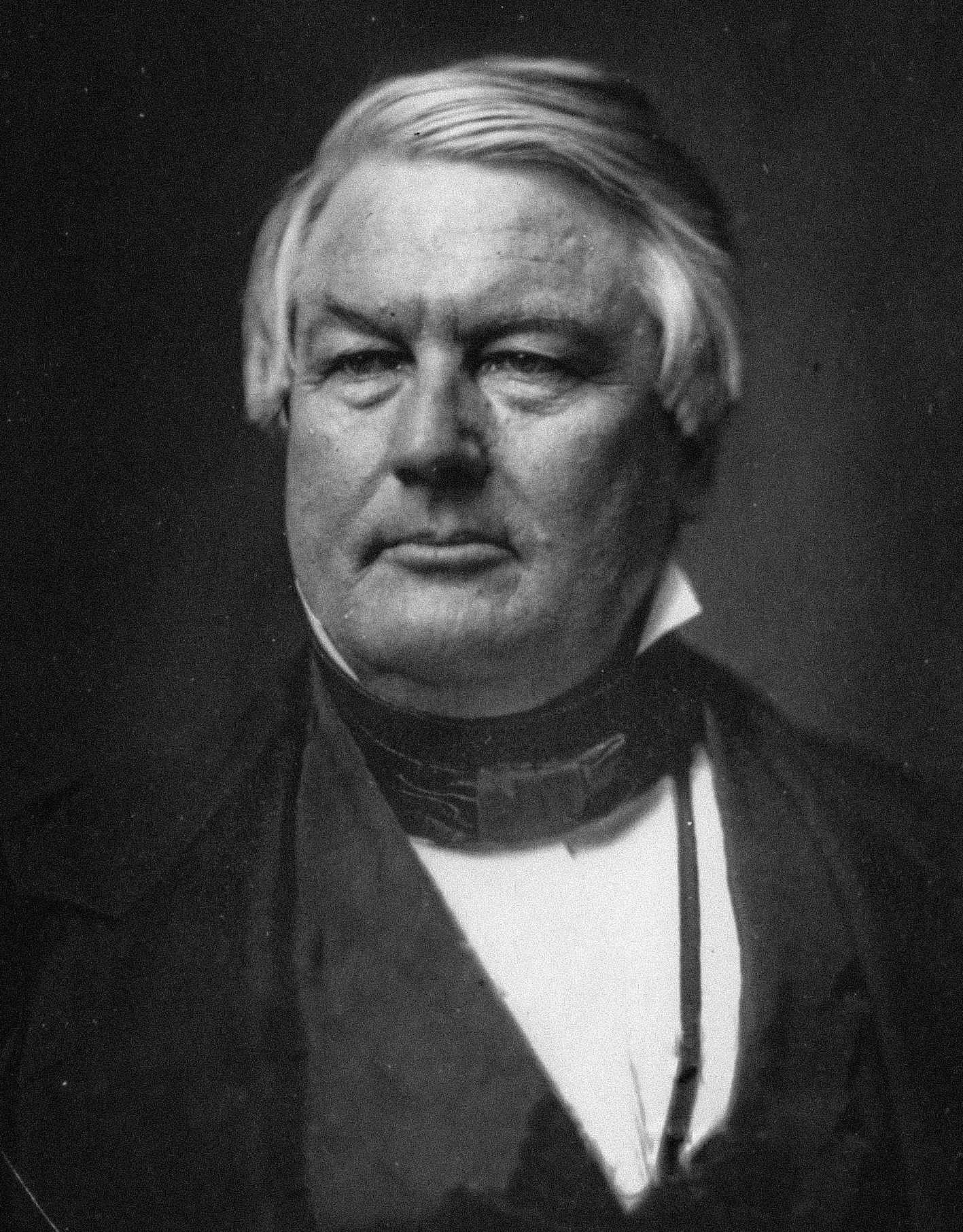
Nominee	John C. Frémont	James Buchanan	Millard Fillmore
Party	Republican	Democratic	Know Nothing
Home state	California	Pennsylvania	New York
Running mate	William L. Dayton	John C. Breckinridge	Andrew Jackson Donelson
Electoral vote	13	0	0
Popular vote	108,172	39,244	19,626
Percentage	63.61%	23.08%	11.54%
County results
Frémont
40–50%
50–60%
60–70%
70–80%
80–90%
President before election
Franklin Pierce
Democratic
Elected President
James Buchanan
Democratic

The 1856 United States presidential election in Massachusetts took place on November 4, 1856, as part of the 1856 United States presidential election. Voters chose 13 representatives, or electors to the Electoral College, who voted for president and vice president.

Massachusetts voted for the Republican candidate, John C. Frémont, over the Democratic candidate, James Buchanan, and the Know Nothing candidate, Millard Fillmore. Frémont won Massachusetts by a margin of 40.53%.

With 63.61% of the popular vote, Massachusetts would prove to be Frémont's second strongest state in the 1856 election after neighboring Vermont.

== Results ==
1856 United States presidential election in Massachusetts
Party	Candidate	Votes	%
Republican	John C. Frémont	108,172	63.61%
Democratic	James Buchanan	39,244	23.08%
Know Nothing	Millard Fillmore	19,626	11.54%
Others	N/A	3,006	1.77%
Total votes		170,048	100%

=== Results by County ===
1856 United States Presidential Election in Massachusetts (By County)
County	John C. Frémont Republican		James Buchanan Democratic		Millard Fillmore Know Nothing		Total
County	#	%	#	%	#	%	Total
Barnstable	2,667	72.67%	703	19.16%	300	8.17%	3,670
Berkshire	5,344	63.09%	2,749	32.46%	377	4.45%	8,470
Bristol	8,845	72.23%	2,465	20.13%	936	7.64%	12,246
Dukes	317	52.83%	161	26.83%	122	20.33%	600
Essex	15,885	68.84%	4,577	19.84%	2,612	11.32%	23,074
Franklin	4,445	74.44%	1,266	21.20%	260	4.35%	5,971
Hampden	5,533	62.21%	2,730	30.69%	631	7.09%	8,894
Hampshire	5,166	82.33%	832	13.26%	277	4.41%	6,275
Middlesex	17,222	59.34%	7,705	26.55%	4,095	14.11%	29,022
Nantucket	583	74.55%	126	16.11%	73	9.34%	782
Norfolk	8,402	56.89%	3,697	25.03%	2,670	18.08%	14,769
Plymouth	7,228	68.86%	1,772	16.88%	1,496	14.25%	10,496
Suffolk	8,582	44.97%	5,853	30.67%	4,648	24.36%	19,083
Worcester	17,971	75.81%	4,604	19.42%	1,129	4.76%	23,704
Totals	108,190	64.76%	39,240	23.49%	19,626	11.75%	167,056

== See also ==
- United States presidential elections in Massachusetts
