= Andrew Paley =

American musical artist

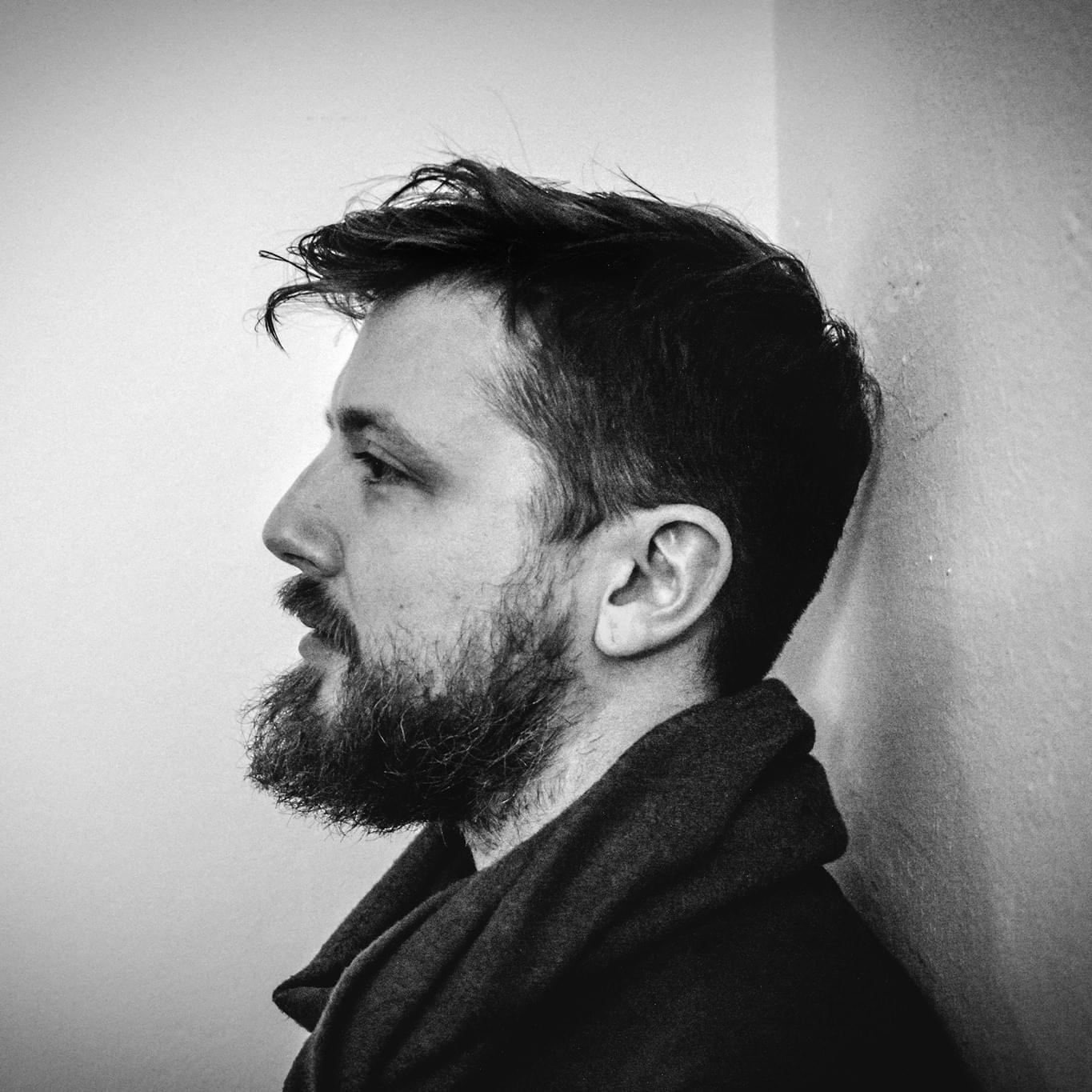

Background information
- Origin: Burlington, Vermont, U.S.
- Genres: Post-punk; alternative pop; folk; art rock; synth-pop; indie rock; alternative rock
- Labels: Paper + Plastick; Flail Records; Makemyday Records; Highwires; Flix; Cargo; SBÄM; Dim Mak
- Member of: The Static Age
- Website: andrewpaley.com

Andrew Paley is an American singer, songwriter, multi-instrumentalist and producer based in Chicago, Illinois. As a solo artist and with his band, The Static Age, his work spans multiple genres including post-punk, alternative pop, folk, art rock and electronic music.

== Biography ==
Paley was born in New Haven, Connecticut, and spent some time in Madison, WI before attending grade school and high school outside of Burlington, Vermont. He began attending all-ages shows at 242 Main in Burlington, Vermont when he was 13, and started playing in punk and hardcore bands at 14. Along with his bandmates, he formed what would become The Static Age in high school.

== Musical career ==
Paley's first solo effort was the album White Rooms, which he recorded with Matt Squire (who also produced The Static Age's Neon Nights Electric Lives album) at Phase Studios in College Park, Maryland "pretty soon after" The Static Age's sessions there. However, Paley largely turned his attention back to The Static Age and didn't pursue solo work for a number of years. During this time, he continued to record songs on his own, but didn't release them.

In late 2014, Paley collected a set of songs from his home recording sessions and released an EP Songs for Dorian Gray on Flix Records/Cargo and toured in Europe with Garrett Klahn of Texas Is the Reason, Karl Larsson of Last Days of April, and Northcote. Additional solo tours in Europe, the US and Brazil followed in 2015 and 2016 alongside Adam Rubenstein (of Chamberlain) and The Lion and The Wolf. In 2016, Paley also made his first appearance at The Fest in Gainesville, Florida.

In November 2016, Paley released his second album, Sirens, on Paper + Plastick in North America and Makemyday Records in Europe. The album combined the songs from Songs for Dorian Gray with four new recordings.

The following year, Paley toured Japan for the first time with Garrett Klahn and The Lion and the Wolf. The video for Paley's song "Come Home" (from Sirens) documents the trip. Paley then returned to Europe multiple times alongside Bob Nanna and Arms & Hearts. Throughout, Paley was writing in his home studio between tours as well as touring with The Static Age. He also contributed a cover of Elliott Smith's "Waltz #2" to the tribute album A Brief Smile on Funk Turry Funk.

In 2018, Paley returned to Europe for tours with Ducking Punches and Emperor X. In December of that year, one of Paley's collaborations with electronic musician StayLoose, a song called "Let Go", was released on Steve Aoki’s record label, Dim Mak.

In October 2019, Paley began to release singles that were to build up to an album release in early 2020. The first single, "Caroline", was released on October 4 (with an accompanying video created by Paige Duché of Lucy Daydream). Around this time, a tour with Italy's HÅN was announced for March 2020, though it was subsequently canceled due to COVID-19.

Right around the cancellation of that tour, Paley released another single, "Give Up", with an accompanying video created by Paley via generative AI. A fourth single "Stay Safe" (with B-side "Straight into Night") then followed in July, and a fifth, "Sequels", came out in early October. Both "Stay Safe" and "Sequels" were accompanied by videos Paley had leveraged generative AI models to create, but "Sequels" was different from the earlier experiments and featured dozens of clips from films in which the actors' lips were re-synced through the use of AI such that they appear to sing along.

Following this string of digital singles, Paley's third solo full-length, Scattered Light, was released digitally in October 2020 on Highwires. A vinyl edition came out in Summer 2021.

In December 2020, Paley released a split single with folk punk band Days N' Daze on which Days N' Daze cover Paley's song "Caroline". This was then followed in 2021 by another collaboration with StayLoose on Dim Mak, "Cold Comfort", as well as a remix EP featuring remixes from OMAS and Arkayne, and a few shows with Days N' Daze and Bridge City Sinners. This was followed by the release of a collaboration with synthwave artist Dryve on the song "Dead Air" in 2022.

According to social media posts, Paley is working on the follow-up to Scattered Light and additional collaborations as of Spring 2023.

== Collaborations ==
Paley has collaborated with a number of other artists, most notably with electronic musician StayLoose on "Let Go" and "Cold Comfort" both released on Dim Mak (along with a "Cold Comfort" remix EP) and synthwave artist Dryve on "Dead Air". Other collaborators include The Lion and the Wolf (who sang backing vocals on Paley's song "Come Home") and the band Days N' Daze who covered Paley's song "Caroline" for a compilation associated with The Fest and then released a split 7" with Paley in December 2020 on Flail Records and SBÄM. Paley also sang backup vocals on Bane's The Note album.

== Generative Art and AI Research ==
Outside of music, Paley is also an artificial intelligence researcher and engineer who works in the space of natural language processing, human-information interfaces, and generative art. To date, he has produced three music videos that incorporate AI-generated animation which became available on YouTube in 2020. He is a PhD candidate in Computer Science at Northwestern University and is an author on multiple publications and patents.

== Politics ==
Paley is politically progressive and a longtime supporter of Bernie Sanders, and he has performed at rallies for and with Sanders (with The Static Age).

== Discography ==
=== Albums ===
- White Rooms (2011 - Highwires)
- Sirens (2016 - Paper + Plastick / Makemyday Records)
- Scattered Light (2020 - Highwires)

=== EPs ===
- Songs for Dorian Gray (2014 - Flix Records / Cargo)

=== Singles ===
- Caroline (2019 - Highwires)
- One Match Fire (2019 - Highwires)
- Give Up (2020 - Highwires)
- Stay Safe / Straight Into Night (2020 - Highwires)
- Sequels (2020 - Highwires)

=== Collaborations ===
- Let Go (with StayLoose) (2018 - Dim Mak)
- Cold Comfort (with StayLoose) (2021 - Dim Mak)
- Cold Comfort EP w/ Remixes (with StayLoose, OMAS, Arkayne, Mona San) (2022 - Dim Mak)
- Dead Air (with Dryve) (2022)

=== Splits ===
- Caroline (with Days N' Daze) (2020 - Flail Records / SBÄM)
