= Don't Wait Up =

Don't Wait Up may refer to:

- Don't Wait Up (TV series), a British sitcom that aired between 1983 and 1990
- Don't Wait Up (album), a 2014 album by American punk band Bane
- "Don't Wait Up" (song), a 2021 single by Colombian singer Shakira
- "Don't Wait Up", a 1991 song by Samantha Fox from Just One Night (Samantha Fox album)
