= Noble & Cooley =

American drum manufacturer

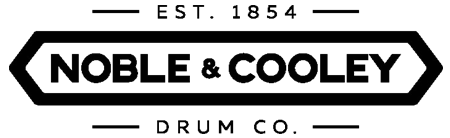
- Type: Private
- Industry: Musical instruments
- Founded: January 1854; 172 years ago
- Founder: Silas Noble & James Cooley
- Headquarters: Granville, Massachusetts, United States
- Key people: Jay Jones (President)
- Products: Snare drums, drum kits
- Website: noblecooley.com

Noble & Cooley is an American musical instruments manufacturing company based out of Granville, Massachusetts. Having been established in 1854, it is the oldest drum company in the United States and is one of the oldest in the world. Having manufactured toy drums at the beginning, Noble & Cooley soon entered the professional drum market.

Noble & Cooley has specialized in snare drums, although the company also manufactures whole drum kits. The company is still a family business, with a Cooley's descendant presiding it.

== History ==
Silas Noble, a farmer, had started producing toy drums in his kitchen to give as Christmas presents. He soon joined his friend James Cooley to build marching snare drums for the Union Army during the Civil War. In the company's first year, 631 toy drums were built. They were simple instruments made of plain wood and painted. By 1873, the company produced 100,000 drums a year.

After the Civil War, the N&C factory employed 17 people who produced 80,000 drums annually. Noble & Cooley also made toy drum sets for children through most of the 1900s. In the early 1980s, company vice-president Jay Jones (Great-great-great grandson of James Cooley) decided to enter the professional drum arena, effectively starting the custom drum shop movement in the US. He worked closely with designer Bob Gatzen and pulled out of retirement a steam bending machine that was old enough to have survived a fire in 1889. Noble & Cooley first offered its SS Classic solid shell snare drums in 1983. The SS Classic series was the first one ply construction snare drum of the modern era. The company briefly tried to manufacture complete solid shell kits and were able to produce some, most notably used by Denny Carmassi in Heart. The cost and daunting nature of constructing larger shell sizes led the company to abandon complete kits and focus primarily on the snare drums. Since that time, the company has created many other professional wood and metal snare drums and different lines of complete drum sets. In 1989, Noble & Cooley teamed up with the Avedis Zildjian Company to create snare drums made out of the Zildjian cymbal alloy. These drums were made in limited quantities and primarily to professional drummers.

After suffering some financial setbacks pertaining to globalization of their toy business, the company scaled back its innovation and production efforts and built snare drums and drum sets on demand for the better part of a decade. They partnered with business executive, drummer and long time Noble & Cooley player John Keane to reinvigorate the brand. A key result of this partnership was the re-introduction of Horizon and Solid Shell Series Kits in 2016. The company also purchased the Witt drum company the year prior. The first release from this acquisition was the highly touted Walnut snare drum line.

== Manufacturing process ==
Noble & Cooley's introduced some innovations in the manufacturing of drums, such as the ply steam bent for snares, the hybrid (more than one type of wood in a ply shell) drum set, the nodal point lug mounting, a technique of mounting drum lugs at the point on the shell where it vibrates the least, allowing the drum to resonate, the symmetrical Venting (a technique of creating vent hole to allow maximum tone in each drum); sharp bearing edges (45° degree angle narrow cut, minimizing drum head contact for maximum sustain); staggered ply construction –choosing ply numbers and thickness to optimize tone independently and in between drums–; suspension mounting (a technique of isolating each shell from the rest of the kit even while mounted, maximizing sustain); cool mounts (a tom mount system providing quick and easy set-up and breakdown, also allowing for quick change-out of drums in the recording studio)

== Products line ==
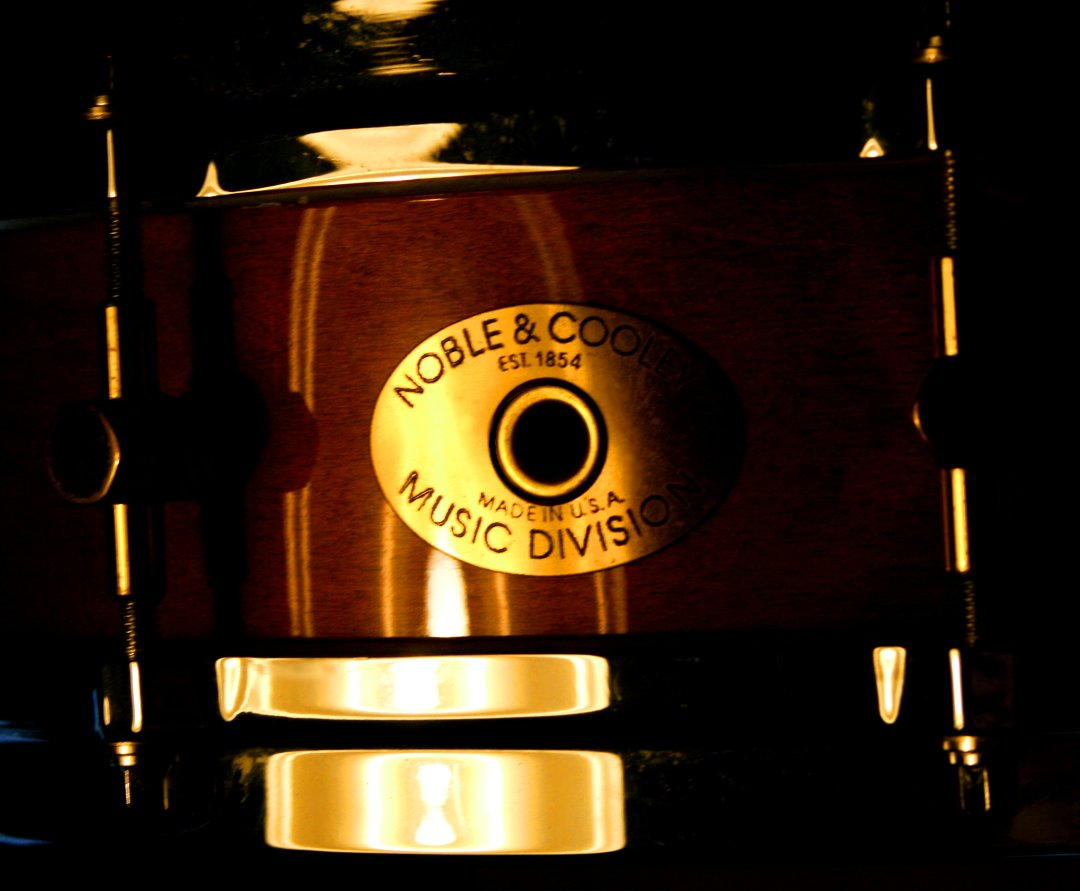
Noble & Cooley snare drum

- CD Maple Series Kits - These are maple drums that are custom designed (hence the CD) for each drummer according to personal preference. Despite this, only about half of the CD Maple drum sets are ordered according to specific customer input through a custom drum shop. The company produces the most popular current configurations for dealers to stock. Drums in this series can be made to individual requirements and the customer has substantial input in deciding what drum sizes, lugs, finishes, badges, heads and hoops are to be used.
- Horizon Series Kits - Horizon Series drums were originally designed to have similar sonic qualities as the company's original solid shell drum kits. In the development process, it was determined that the shells were too harsh sounding so the company decided to warm up the tone by adding Mahogany, Thus, all Horizon drums have 6 plies of Maple and one interior ply of Mahogany. Through this design process, the company ended up creating its first hybrid drum set. All but 2 plies (for stability) of the 7 plies of wood have a horizontal wood grain orientation (hence the name "Horizon") which allow the drums to resonate uniformly like a solid shell kit would, with the added benefit of a two toned wood blend which hybrid kits bring. As with the CD maples, the customer has a choice of sizes, finishes, heads and hoops. These drums were discontinued for a long time due to the cost of production but the company reissued them in 2015 due to customer interest in vintage tones and hybrid shell drums.
- SS Classic Snares - SS Classic Snare drums are the original modern, steam bent, solid shell snare drums. Introduced in 1983, these drums became an immediate and long lasting success in the professional recording industry. Though not officially tracked, these drums have cited as being used on at least 10 of the top 100 selling albums of all time in addition to countless other recordings heard every day around the world. This is an amazing feat for a small, family owned company that has only been making drum set instruments since the early 80s in a world that has dozens of mass production companies with large marketing and artist endorsement budgets.
- Alloy Classic Snares - The limited edition Zildjian production runs led to the idea of having an in-house metal drum to complement the company's wood drum lines. The Alloy Classic has an aluminum shell that is cast and machined rather than cold-rolled. It is bright and resonant, the metal equivalent of a solid shell.
- CD Maple Snares - These snares have the same construction methods and philosophy as the CD Maple drum sets. Maple only, similar sound to SS Classics but with a slightly dampened sound by comparison.
- Horizon Snares - Using exactly the same construction methods as the Horizon kits, these snares have a darker tone, shorter attack and drier sound than the company's other drums.
- Walnut Snares – These drums are the only drums offered by Noble & Cooley not designed in house. A limited run co-branded offering led to Noble & Cooley acquiring the brand from the Witt Drum Company in 2015. Offered a very dry, retro tone and organic look.
- SE Snares - The SE in the name stands for "Special Edition".
- Studio Classic Series - The Studio Classics series (kits and snares) were built with the idea of offering a high quality kit at a more affordable price. The kits were made from exactly the same shells as CD Maples but offered in a limited assortment of colors and sizes to reduce costs. The kits also used a different, less expensive, tube style lug that saved of the overall cost.
- Horizon Series - Horizon Series drums were designed to have similar sonic qualities to their discontinued Star Series drums which were solid shells. The Horizons had 6 plies of maple and one interior ply of mahogany to darken the tone. All but 2 plies (for stability) of the 7 plies of wood had horizontal wood grain orientation (hence the name "Horizon"), similar to solid shells as well. They had node mounted tube lugs and diecast hoops. These were reintroduced in 2015 due to customer interest in vintage tones and hybrid kits.
- Star Series - These drums went into production briefly around 1987. They were solid shell drums (made from one solid piece of maple, steam bent into a circle). These had node mount retaining hoops (required for solid shell drums), node mounted tube lugs and diecast hoops. The most outwardly noticeable characteristic of these drums is their shallow depths, half the depth of most drums made in the 1980s, a necessity since they were bent in the same machine that produced their solid shell snare drums. Sizes were 6x10, 6x12, 6x13, 7x14, 8x16. Bass drums were normal depths since they were not made of solid shells, but were instead 6 ply maple.
- SS Classic Series - The SS Classic Series solid shell drums (only 10 made) were built personally between 1987 and 1988 by Jay Jones. They were designed after the well known Classic SS snare. These drums were made from a solid piece of New England Rock maple and steam bent into a drum shell. The SS Classic kits utilize the same brass tube hardware and the same SS classic badge as the SS Classic snare, thus the name. These are standard depth shells as opposed to the shallow depth Star Series. Sizes were 8x10, 8x12, 9x13, 12x14, 14x16. The 16x20 bass drum is the only shell that is not steam bent but is a Horizon Series shell per Jay Jones. These are completely redesigned and reintroduced in 2016 as the company's flagship product.

== Endorsers ==
Some of the musicians that use/have used N&C drums include Phil Collins, Bill Stevenson (Descendents, Black Flag), Nick Buda (Taylor Swift, Dolly Parton), Jack Ryan (Marcus King Band), Bill Kreutzmann (Grateful Dead, Dead and Company, Wesley Bourque (Logan Crosby, Thompson Square), Christiano Micalizzi (Eros Ramazzotti) Dave Joyal (Silent Drive), Bob Mahoney (Bane), and Mike Pedicone (The Bled). Other artists are known to have used Noble and Cooley even though they are not official endorsers. Herman Rarebell (Scorpions), Alex Van Halen (Van Halen), Dave Krusen (Pearl Jam), Nick Mason (Pink Floyd), and Steve White (Session legend) have used Noble & Cooley snare drums in their setup, even though the rest of their kit is from a different manufacturer. Tre Cool of Green Day calls the 7x14 SS Classic his most prized and "still go-to" snare which he purchased for $600 before recording Dookie in 1993. Jon Fishman of Phish also uses a set made up of almost entirely Noble and Cooley drums, with the exception of his bass drum.

Other endorsers are Denny Carmassi (Heart, Cinderella, Coverdale/Page, Whitesnake Chris Whitten (Dire Straits, Paul McCartney) and Malcolm Travis (Sugar)
