= Granville Village Historic District =

Historic district in Massachusetts, United States

- U.S. National Register of Historic Places
- U.S. Historic district
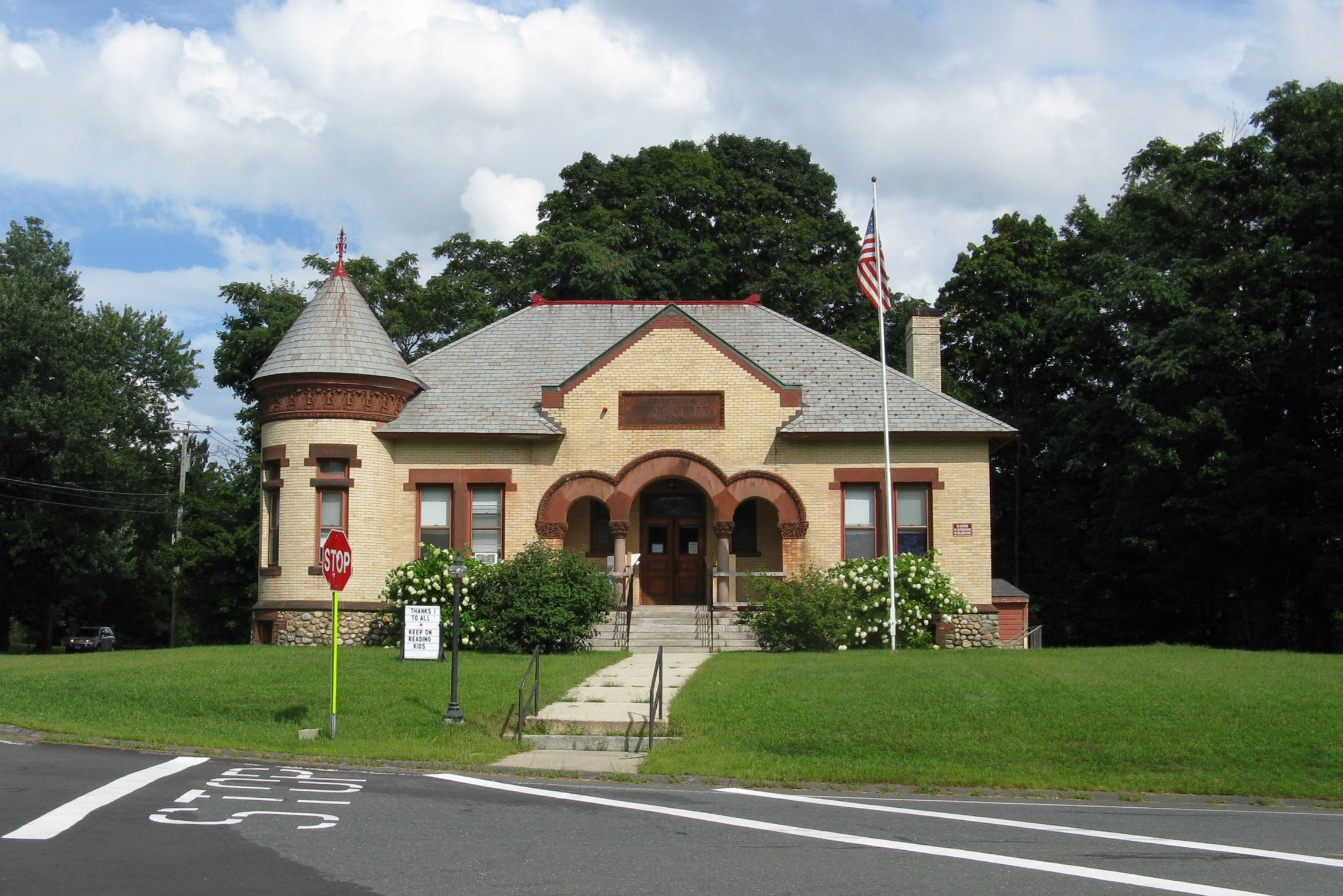
- Granville Public Library

- Location within Massachusetts Location within the United States
- Location: Roughly, area around the junction of Maple St. and Main and Granby Rds., including part of Water St., Granville, Massachusetts
- Coordinates: 42°3′54″N 72°51′49″W
- Area: 59 acres (24 ha)
- Architectural style: Greek Revival, Georgian, Federal
- NRHP reference No.: 91001588
- Added to NRHP: November 5, 1991

The Granville Village Historic District is a historic district encompassing the historic Granville Village area in eastern Granville, Massachusetts. The area was developed in the 19th century as an industrial village, centered on the drum factory of Noble & Cooley on Dickinson Brook. The predominantly residential district includes a number of Greek Revival houses; it also includes the Colonial Revival public library building (built 1902). It is located roughly in the area around the junction of Maple St. and Main and Granby Rds., including part of Water Street. The district was listed on the National Register of Historic Places in 1991.

== Description and history ==
Granville was settled in 1734, with most of its early activity focused around Granville Center. East Granville, now Granville Village, also came to support a tavern and a few mills in the late 19th century. In 1790, the First Baptist Church was established in the village, which in the mid-19th century became the focus of a single industry, the manufacture of drums. The firm of Noble & Cooley was founded in 1854, and continues to operate in 19th-century factory buildings on Water Street. The success of this firm and others in the industry spurred the village's growth in the second half of the 19th century, and continue to be a major economic force today.

The historic district is centered around the junction of Main Road (Massachusetts Route 57) and Granby Road, with a major extension along Water Street to the southwest, where most of the industry is located. The triangular green at the central junction is an early 20th-century addition, the result of the loss by fire of a hotel. Most of the village's architecture dates between 1830 and 1890, with Victorian and Colonial Revival architecture predominating. The most architecturally sophisticated building is the library, a Romanesque Revival brick building constructed in 1901.

== See also ==
- National Register of Historic Places listings in Hampden County, Massachusetts
- West Granville Historic District
