= Days N' Daze =

American folk punk band

- Also known as: DnD, Days N Daze
- Origin: Houston, Texas
- Genre: Folk punk
- Instruments: Acoustic guitar; mandolin; banjo; trumpet; accordion; ukulele; washboard; washtub bass
- Years active: 2008–present
- Labels: Goathead Record Collective, Flail Records, Escape From the Zoo Records, Fat Wreck Chords
- Members: Jesse Sendejas; Whitney Flynn; Meagan Michelle; Matt Willhelm
- Past members: Geoff Bell (2013–2022); Marissa Sendejas (2011–2013); Matt Tobey (2011); Freddie Boatright (2011–2012)
- Website: daysndaze.net

Days N' Daze is an American band formed in Houston, Texas performing a type of folk punk they have called 'H-Town Thrashgrass'. Promoting a strong DIY ethic, Days N' Daze independently records, produces, and promotes all their own music. Song themes range from anarchism and environmental issues to anxiety, alcoholism, and parties. They are known for their energetic live shows. Days N' Daze has toured extensively in the US, Canada, and Europe, playing anything from house shows to festivals. Days N' Daze has opened for several national acts, including The Infamous Stringdusters, M.D.C., New Zealand's Night Gaunts, Cancerslug, and Black Flag founder The Chuck Dukowski Sextet.

== History ==
Days N' Daze was founded in 2008 by Whitney Flynn and Jesse Sendejas who both grew up in Rosenberg, Texas. They knew each other since high school and had been sweethearts before the founding of the band. In the beginning, they were the band's only members: Whitney Flynn, with a musical background of classical piano lessons at a young age, followed by years as a trumpeter in her junior and high school's marching band. And Jesse Sendejas, a self-taught guitar player, was introduced to music at an early age by his father, a Houston Press music writer. In the beginning, Flynn and Sendejas didn't have enough funds to buy musical equipment to start a proper punk band, so they started playing all-acoustic. Yet in the band's early days the now characteristic trumpet sound was still absent, as Sendejas felt it wouldn't fit the musical style they were playing. However, he changed his mind after about two years of Flynn's persuasive efforts to give it a try.

Flynn graduated a year early from high school and enrolled at Texas State University in San Marcos. Sendejas, still attending high school, soon afterward abandoned education altogether and joined Flynn in San Marcos, a college town both started to loathe early on. In the following years, still being a couple, they started touring extensively and recorded their first four albums. These recordings took place in a closet in the house of Sendejas' father in Richmond, Texas, the same place the band is still recording their albums today. It was during this time that the band grew by two more members: Marissa Sendejas, Jesse's sibling playing washboard, and Freddie Boatright, playing the gutbucket. According to Sendejas, this initial choice of instruments was purely a matter of cost. He and Flynn wanted to play punk music from the start but did not have the funds to buy expensive equipment like drums.

Eventually, Flynn dropped out of university without a degree, a decision that has been attributed by some to the immense touring schedule of DnD at the time. However, according to Flynn herself, it was a series of circumstances that led her to leave university education. Among those was the death of her grandfather and the nearly contemporaneous separation from Sendejas as her partner. In the course of these events, she left the university city of San Marcos in 2012 to live for a couple of months without a fixed address. Today Flynn manages Days N' Daze mostly on her own and not only takes care of their finances but handled tour booking for nine years before Crawlspace Booking signed them onto their agency. As Days N' Daze's popularity has grown over the last couple of years and management has become more challenging, Flynn mentioned ideas to continue her education in the area of "music business".

"We record everything ourselves; we book everything ourselves; we manage ourselves."

— Whitney Flynn

Instead of quitting the band after their breakup, Sendejas and Flynn channeled this emotional turmoil into writing and recording their sixth album Rogue Taxidermy. As of today (08/2018) Rogue Taxidermy is their most regarded and top-selling album on Bandcamp. The video of the album's song Misanthropic Drunken Loner has gathered over 6.5 million views on YouTube. The album was released the same year as Oogle Deathmachine. In March 2017 they released Crustfall, which features amongst others Leftöver Crack's Scott Sturgeon. The album title is a wordplay between Crust-Punk and a group exercise called Trust fall.

"Closure's overrated."

— Jesse Sendejas

The dynamic between Flynn and Sendejas has changed considerably over time. While both are still friendly and equally responsible for writing the music of Days N' Daze, a process Sendejas described graphically as two Maelstroms rotating against each other, it has become difficult for the both of them to travel in the same vehicle on tour without starting to hurt each other emotionally.

Days N' Daze have been playing in their current lineup since 2014. As a replacement for Freddie Boatright, who left the band after having a child, Geoff Bell was recruited in 2013 as their gutbucket player at an open gutbucket night, five days before the start of an upcoming DnD tour. Meagan Michelle joined the band in 2014 when their then washboard player was prohibited from crossing state borders for legal reasons. Days N' Daze has an extensive history of touring with several known bands and artists including: Leftöver Crack, We the Heathens, The Infamous Stringdusters, M.D.C., Morning Glory, Night Gaunts (NZ), Cancerslug, or Black Flag founder Chuck Dukowski's Sextet.

On December 20, 2019, Days N' Daze announced that they are working on a new album. On May 1, 2020, the album Show Me The Blueprints was released.

On July 1, 2022, Daze N' Daze added the album Ward off the Vultures to their Spotify.

== Side projects ==
Whilst Freddie Boatwright was in Days N' Daze in 2011 through 2012 would perform for the band The Sidewalk Slammers in 2012 he would also feature on a track titled Homebummin' It by Radio Flyer . After leaving Days N' Daze he would join the band The Slummers and briefly bring back U.NOT.I to record three D.I.Y solo releases recorded by Punk With a Camera

Both Jesse Sendejas and Whitney Flynn are and have been involved in several side projects over the last couple of years. They play together in Decathect, a band that rather resembles a "normal" punk band with its layout consisting of vocals (Flynn/Sendejas), guitar, bass, and drums (Sendejas). Flynn plays trumpet in this band as well. The name "Decathect" describes the act of withdrawing one's feelings of attachment from a person or idea in the anticipation of future loss. Decathect has only released one demo EP to date.

Together with his sibling Marissa, Sendejas has been active in a band called Chad Hates George since 2012 which has put out two releases thus far. In addition, he is most active with his band Escape from the Zoo with whom he has released two EPs and the albums KILLACOPTER in 2017 and COUNTIN' CARDS in 2022.

Whitney Flynn was an integral part of the My Pizza My World collective, with which she released four EPs and albums, before breaking up in 2016. Today Flynn occasionally plays solo shows as a solo artist under her own name or under her pseudonym "Death By Skwerl". Next to acoustic versions of Days N' Daze or My Pizza My World songs she also plays new songs of hers on guitar or ukulele. She toured as a solo act through New Zealand and Australia in November 2017.

Jesse Sendejas has collaborated with the punk band The Real Mccoy's twice once in 2017 on the track Too Far Gone on the album Barfly and once in 2022 on the single Taught to Hate.

Both Flynn and Sendejas appeared on various songs of Dirty Harry's 2018 release Get Busy Living Or Get Busy Crying.

Whitney Flynn featured in a Lightnin Luke DIY Track titled Why Is It So Easy Letting Go.

In 2021 Jesse Sendejas featured on a rap album titled Spitter by Rugged Spitter and Tranzformer on the track Running It would feature vocals from Sendejas and it included a sample from the song Flea Bitten Drifters by Days N' Daze.

In 2021 Jesse Sendejas would feature in the single Silver Lining by Doom Scroll.

In 2021 Jesse Sendejas would feature on the song Some Kind of Hope on the album Escapism by the Austrian punk band The Rumperts.

Whitney Flynn Featured on a single titled Time Dilations Pt.3 by the folk punk band Rumbletramp which released April 25th 2025.

Jesse Sendejas featured on the song All Dogs Live Forever by Mad Conductor which released July 22nd 2025.

== Band members ==
Current members

- Jesse Sendejas – lead vocals, acoustic guitar, accordion, banjo (2008–present)
- Meagan Michelle – washboard, backing vocals (2014–present)
- Matt Willhelm – standup bass (2021–present)
- Whitney Flynn – lead vocals, trumpet, ukulele (2008–present)

Former members

- Geoff Bell – washtub bass (2013–2021)
- Marissa Sendejas – backing vocals, washboard, piano (2011–2013)
- Freddie Boatright – backing vocals, washtub bass (2011–2012)
- Matt Tobey – guitar, vocals (2011)

Live members

- Owen Broke – banjo, accordion, vocals (2024–present)
- Veronica Sendejas – mandolin, vocals (2024–present)

Former live members

- Brew Breaux – guitar, vocals (2011)
- Keenan Peters - spoons (2011-2019) (†)
- Wade Shippey - washboard (2011-2013)
- Emma Polunski - accordion (2016-2019) (†)
- Marissa Sendejas - washboard (2017)

== Discography ==
=== Studio albums ===
- We Never Said It Was Good (2008)
- Perfectly Dysfunctional (2009)
- Here Goes Nothin' (2010)
- Ward Off The Vultures (2011)
- The Oogle Deathmachine (2013)
- Rogue Taxidermy (2013)
- Crustfall (2017)
- Songs We Recorded For Splits (2019)
- Show Me the Blueprints (2020)
- Show Me the Blueprints demos (2024)

=== Singles ===
- Little Blue Pills Pt.2 (2013)
- My Darling Dopamine (2020)
- Libriyum (2020)
- Breakdown (2021)
- Earthquake (2024)
- Murphy's Law (2024)

=== Splits ===
- "Oogles doodles punx and drunks"

Dayn N Daze/Potbelly split 7". (2010).

- Days N' Daze // Arroyo Deathmatch Split (2012)
- Days N' Daze // Rail Yard Ghosts Split (2014)
- Days N' Daze // Broken Bow Split (2014)
- Thanks Mom! Split w/ Chicos Del Muertos (Live Recordings) (2015)
- Days N' Daze // Night Gaunts Split (2015)
- Days N' Daze // Potbelly split 7. Vol. 2. (2019).
- Days N' Daze // Andrew Paley "Caroline" Split (2021)

=== Featured on ===
- Bedbugs & Beyond by Leftöver Crack (2016)
- no one in this town by Dear Me (2023)

=== Music videos ===
- Misanthropic Drunken Loner (2014)
- Fallout (2014)
- Call in the Coroner (2015)
- SHITMACHINE (2015)
- Post Party Depression (2016)
- Bedbugs & Beyond(2016) (Leftöver Crack cover)
- Damaged Goods (2017)
- Days N' Daze of Our Lives (2018)
- Self Loathing (2020)
