= Neon Nights (disambiguation) =

Neon Nights is a 2003 album by Dannii Minogue.

Neon Nights may also refer to:

- Neon Nights: 30 Years of Heaven & Hell, a 2010 album by Heaven & Hell
- "Neon Nights", a 1982 song by Accept from Restless and Wild
- The Lia Show, formerly Neon Nights, a syndicated country music and entertainment radio program

== See also ==
- Neon Nights Electric Lives, a 2005 album by the Static Age
- "Neon Knights", a 1980 song by Black Sabbath
