= Give blood (disambiguation) =

Blood donation occurs when an individual voluntarily has blood drawn, usually for a blood transfusion to another person.

Give blood may also refer to:

- Give Blood (Bane album), a 2001 album by American band Bane
- Give Blood (Brakes album), a 2005 album by the British band Brakes
- "Give Blood" (song), a 1986 song by Pete Townshend
- "Give Blood" (Beavis and Butt-Head), a 1993 television episode
