= Static Age (disambiguation) =

Static Age may refer to:

- Static Age, an album by the Misfits
  - "Static Age", a song by the Misfits on that album
- The Static Age, a post punk band named for the Misfits album
- "The Static Age", a song by Green Day on the album 21st Century Breakdown
