= Eat My Life =

2006 album by Chuck Dukowski

Studio album by The Chuck Dukowski Sextet
- Released: 2007
- Recorded: September 2005
- Studio: Little Kicker Sound
- Genre: Alternative rock; punk rock
- Length: 35:13
- Label: Nice & Friendly Records
- Producer: Chuck Dukowski

The Chuck Dukowski Sextet chronology
Eat My Life (2007)	Reverse the Polarity (2007)

Chuck Dukowski chronology
United Gang Members (1994)

Eat My Life is the debut release by The Chuck Dukowski Sextet, led by founding and former bassist of Black Flag, Chuck Dukowski. It was released in 2007 on Dukowski's own label Nice & Friendly Records. The album features the original lineup of the band, with Dukowski, his wife Lora Norton on vocals, Lynn Johnston (formerly with Cruel Frederick and Slovenly) on saxophone and clarinet, and Bill Stinson (who worked with Dukowski on the United Gang Members album) on drums.

The album was recorded in September 2005 at the personal recording studio of Red Hot Chili Peppers bassist Flea, Little Kicker Sound. Greg Cameron, who played drums with Dukowski in The October Faction and SWA, served as the recording engineer on the album. In addition to the core band, the album also has guest appearances from Saccharine Trust guitarist Joe Baiza, Flea (playing mellotron and tambourine), and Dukowski's son Milo Gonzalez (who has since become a permanent member of the band) on guitar.

The album features all original material save for covers of The Velvet Underground's "Venus in Furs" and Black Flag's "My War" (which Dukowski had composed).

In addition to her roles as co-writer and lead vocalist on the album, Lora Norton handled the CD package's graphic design and all of the artwork, save for a drawing of a pig on the inside cover done by Dukowski and Norton's daughter, Lola Dukowski.

Professional ratings
Review scores
Source	Rating
Allmusic	(N/A) link
PunkNews.org	4.5/5 stars

== Track listing ==
1. "Eat My Life" – 3:30
2. "Xipe Totec" – 3:28
3. "Dreaming of the Endless Death" – 3:16
4. "Freedom?" – 2:17
5. "Night of the Hunter" – 1:39
6. "Atoms" – 1:34
7. "The Hammer Will Fall" – 3:05
8. "Venus in Furs" (Lou Reed) – 3:54
9. "My Blood Shines So Bright" – 2:09
10. "Just Like This" (Dukowski, Norton, Johnston, Stinson) – 3:05
11. "The Day My World Fell Apart" – 1:57
12. "Leave All This Behind" – 1:44
13. "My War" (Chuck Dukowski) – 3:35

All songs written and composed by Chuck Dukowski and Lora Norton except where noted.

== Musical Personnel ==
- Chuck Dukowski - five-string bass, backing acoustic and electric guitar
- Lora Norton - vocals
- Lynn Johnston - saxophone, clarinet
- Bill Stinson - drums
- Joe Baiza - electric guitar on "Freedom?" and "Xipe Totec"
- Flea - mellotron and tambourine on "Venus in Furs"
- Mario (Boomer) Lalli - electric guitar on "Eat My Life" and "Dreaming of the Endless Death"
- Milo Gonzalez - electric guitar on "Atoms"
