= Daniel Penfield =

American merchant and Revolutionary War veteran

Daniel Penfield (1759 – 1840) was an American merchant and Revolutionary War veteran who is best known for founding the Monroe County town of Penfield, New York.

== Biography ==
Born on April 25, 1759, to Isaac and Esther Hurlburt Penfield in Guilford, Connecticut, Penfield served as a clerk in the commissary department under Oliver Phelps during the Revolutionary War. The family moved to Hartland, Connecticut, prior to the war and later to Granville, Massachusetts.

Circa 1784, Penfield married Mary Fellows (born September 10, 1762), daughter of John and Mary Ashley Fellows. General Fellows served as an aide-de-camp to George Washington. The couple bore five children: Henry (born July 18, 1785), Harriet (born May 12, 1787), Charlotte (born May 22, 1791), Mary Jane (born 1794), and George (born November, 1797). Shortly after marrying, the couple moved to Hillsdale, New York, and opened a general store. The store was burnt by an angry mob during Shays' Rebellion, so the couple moved to New York City sometime around 1789. Penfield became owner of a "lucrative commission business" and began making speculative land purchases of tracts in present-day Wayne County, New York, in 1790 and present-day Perinton, New York, in 1792. Penfield bought his first parcel in the present-day town of Penfield on February 4, 1795. Penfield opened another general store in Claverack, New York, and maintained homes in Hudson, New York, and New York City. He kept these properties until Embargo Act of 1807 severely curtailed his commission business, prompting his decision to move to his Western New York lands in 1809. Penfield contracted with carpenters from Albany, New York, to build his homestead in 1811. The house still stands today at 1784 Penfield Road. Over the years, he built or controlled several mills on Irondequoit Creek, including a sawmill, grist mill, distillery, ashery, oil mill, soap mill, clothing mill, and tannery. Penfield owned several African-American slaves until slavery was abolished in New York in 1827. Penfield spoke at the ceremonies welcoming the Marquis de Lafayette during his visit of June, 1825. His last commercial undertaking, a five-story flour mill, built in 1835, failed in part due to the Panic of 1837.

Penfield died on August 24, 1840, and was interred next to his wife (who died August 18, 1828) in Oakwood Cemetery in Penfield, New York.

== Legacy ==
The Town of Penfield, New York and Penfield Road are both named after Penfield. Penfield Street in the Wakefield, Bronx section of the Bronx was also named for him and his family, who once were owners of a mansion located on White Plains Road between what is now Penfield Street and East 242nd Street.
