= Los Angeles 3:58pm =

EP by Bane
- Released: December 2009
- Recorded: June 29 – July 3, 2009
- Genre: Hardcore punk
- Label: 6131 Records

Bane chronology
Boston 6:58pm (2009)	Los Angeles 3:58pm (2009)	Don't Wait Up (2014)

Los Angeles 3:58pm is the second of two 7"'s in Bane's set of "world series" releases. It was released in America on 6131 Records as Los Angeles 3:58pm, in Europe on Hurry Up! Records as Rome 12:58am, and in conjunction with the 1st 7" as a CD in Australia on Resist Records as Perth 7:58am, in Japan on Alliance Trax as Tokyo 7:58am, and in South America on Hurry Up! Records as Curitiba 7:58pm.

No.	Title	Length
1.	"The Guiding Light"	1:52
2.	"As The World Turns"	3:34
3.	"Another World"	3:28
Total length:		8:52

Perth 7:58am/Curitiba 7:58pm
No.	Title	Length
1.	"The Bold and the Beautiful"	2:40
2.	"As The World Turns"	3:34
3.	"The Guiding Light"	1:52
4.	"Another World"	3:28
5.	"One Life To Live"	1:22
6.	"The Young and the Restless"	3:10
Total length:		16:06

Tokyo 7:58am Bonus Track
No.	Title	Length
7.	"Enjoy (Björk cover)"	3:21

== Band members ==
- Aaron Bedard - vocals
- Aaron Dalbec - guitar
- Zach Jordan - guitar
- Brendan Maguire - bass
- Bob Mahoney - drums
