= Granville Center Historic District =

Historic district in Massachusetts, United States

- U.S. National Register of Historic Places
- U.S. Historic district
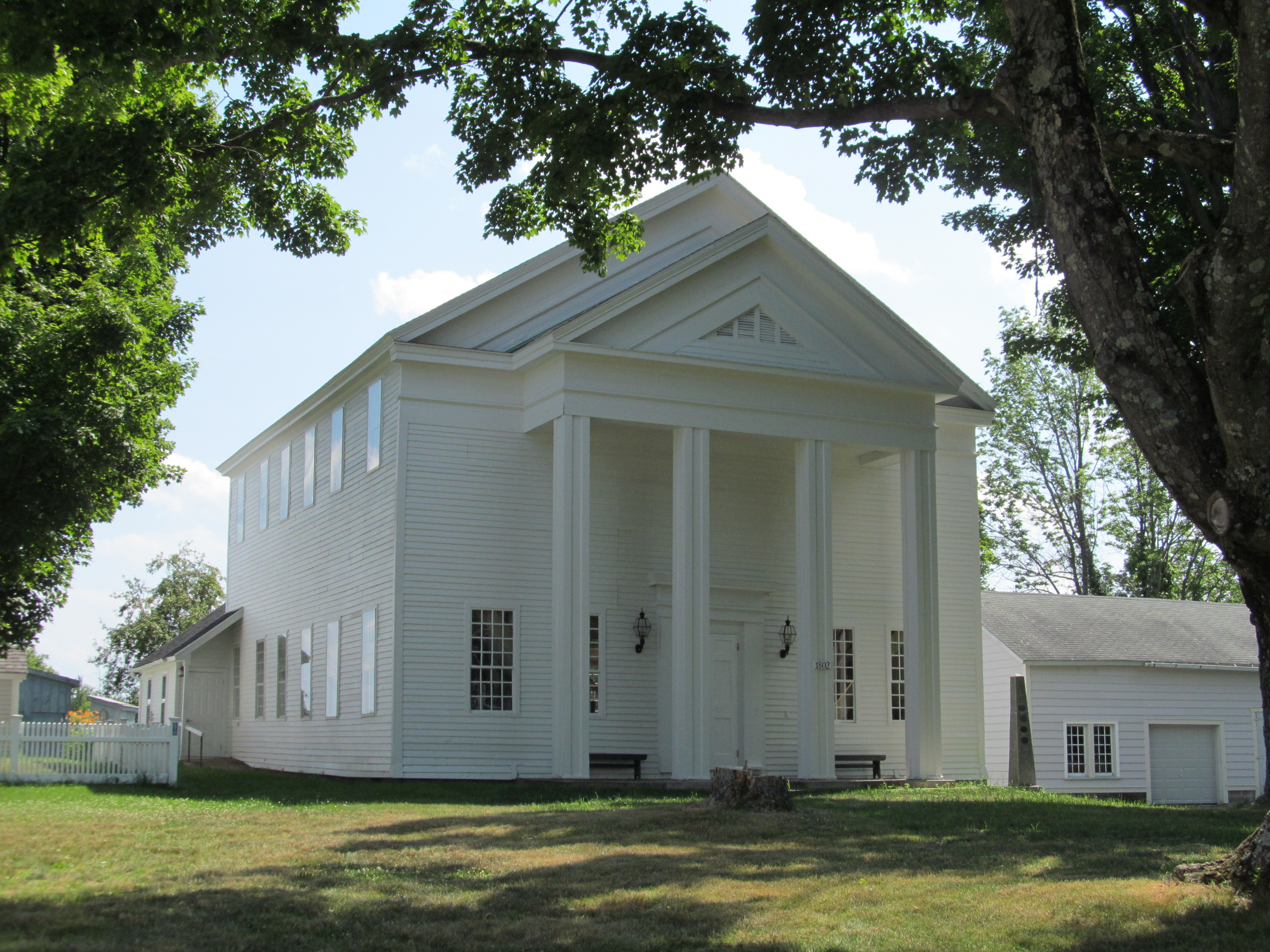
- Old Meeting House

- Location within Massachusetts Location within the United States
- Location: Main Rd., Granville, Massachusetts
- Coordinates: 42°4′2″N 72°52′33″W
- Area: 30 acres (12 ha)
- Architectural style: Greek Revival, Queen Anne, Federal
- NRHP reference No.: 91001587
- Added to NRHP: November 5, 1991

The Granville Center Historic District is a historic district encompassing the historic center of Granville, Massachusetts. The cluster of buildings in the village center includes the Congregational church (built 1802), and a number of Federal and Greek Revival residences. The district was listed on the National Register of Historic Places in 1991.

== Description and history ==
The town of Granville was settled in 1738 and incorporated in 1775. Granville Center was one of its early places of settlement, and is where its first meetinghouse, supposedly near the junction of Main Road (Massachusetts Route 57) and Blandford Road, in about 1747. The foundational remains of an early sawmill and gristmill (c. 1759) survive, and the center's oldest surviving building, the Hubbard House, may have belonged to their owner. The center became the civic, spiritual and economic center of the agricultural community, but declined in economic and religious importance due to religious divisions, and the rise of Granville Village as an industrial center to the east. As a result, the center's architecture is largely reflective of the first half of the 19th century. Its continued civic importance was reinforced when a new town hall was built at the western end of the district in 1927.

The historic district is essentially linear, stretching along Main Road, with Trumble Lane extending south roughly one-third the distance from its western end, which is anchored by the Colonial Revival town hall, the district's only 20th-century building. Most of the buildings in the district are wood-frame houses, and the majority were built during the Federal period. There are only a few Greek Revival and Victorian era buildings, all houses, in the district.

== See also ==
- West Granville Historic District
- National Register of Historic Places listings in Hampden County, Massachusetts
