= Wild Cat Aqueduct =

Aqueduct in Massachusetts, United States

Coordinates: 42°07′02″N 72°52′40″W

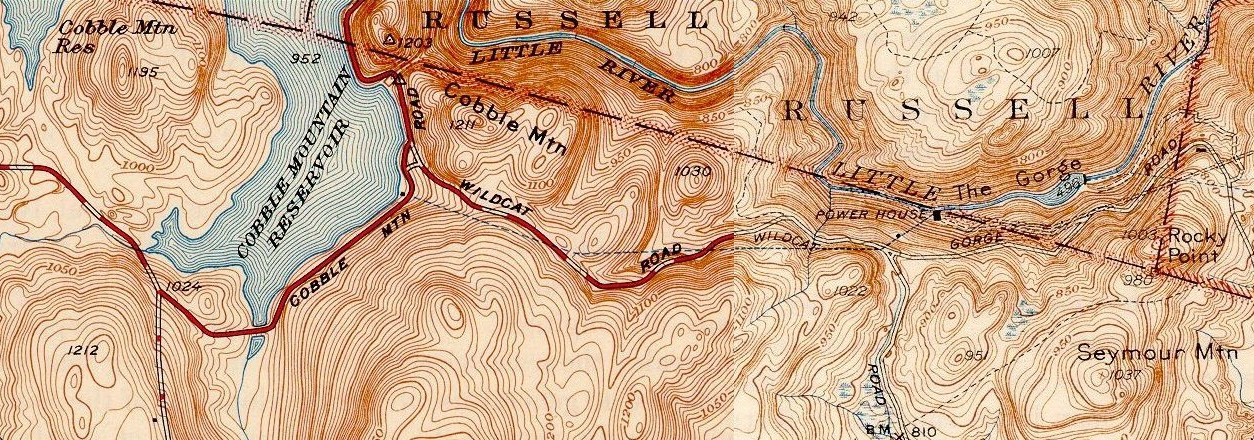
Wild Cat Aqueduct.

Wild Cat Aqueduct is a tunnel carrying water for hydroelectric power and public water supply, located in Granville, Massachusetts.

The aqueduct carries water eastwards from Cobble Mountain Reservoir, located some 20 miles west of Springfield in the towns of Blandford, Granville, and Russell, Massachusetts, to a hydroelectric power station located about 2 miles (3.2 km) downstream on the Little River, just upstream from the Gorge. From there it connects to the Springfield Aqueduct.

The power station was built in 1930 by the City of Springfield, and now owned by the Springfield Water and Sewer Commission and operated by a subsidiary of Northeast Utilities. It contains three generators for a total output of 30.6 megawatts.
