= West Granville Historic District =

Historic district in Massachusetts, United States

- U.S. National Register of Historic Places
- U.S. Historic district
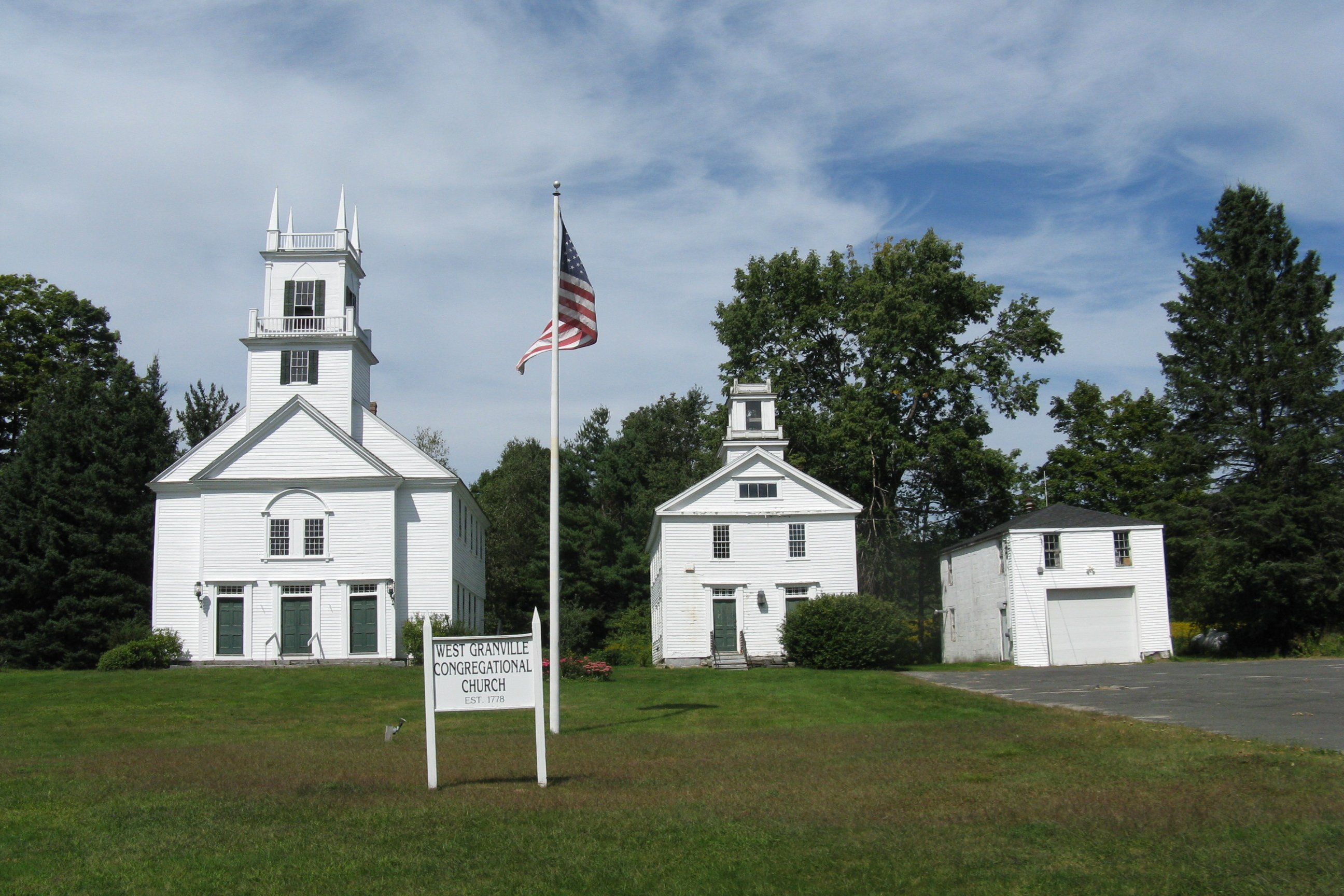
- Congregational Church

- Location within Massachusetts Location within the United States
- Location: Roughly, Main Rd. from west of Beach Hill Rd. to South Ln. No. 2, Granville, Massachusetts
- Coordinates: 42°4′39″N 72°56′18″W
- Architectural style: Greek Revival, Georgian, Federal
- NRHP reference No.: 91001589
- Added to NRHP: November 5, 1991

The West Granville Historic District is a historic district encompassing the center of West Granville, Massachusetts. The village is composed mainly of buildings form the late 18th and early 19th centuries, including an 18th-century church and 1830s academy building. The district was listed on the National Register of Historic Places in 1991.

== Description and history ==
Granville was settled in 1734, with most of its early activity taking place at Granville Center. West Granville developed in an upland valley isolated from the rest of the town as an agricultural area, and the village began to take shape at a crossroads with the construction of the Second Congregational Church in 1778. The village continued to prosper through the first half of the 19th century, but declined thereafter, as economic prospects improved in the eastern part of the town (particularly the growing industry at Granville Village), and Tolland, located just to the west, was separated from the town. As a consequence, the village has a distinct 19th-century aura to it.

The district is basically linear in character, extending along Main Road (Massachusetts Route 57) between its junction with Crest Lane to the east, and the four-way junction with Beech Hill Road and Hartland Hollow Road to the west. It extends a short way north on Beech Hill Road. In addition to the civic buildings at the center of the village, it includes primarily residential buildings stretching along Main Road from west of Beach Hill Road to South Lane No. 2. The civic buildings consist of the 1778 Congregational Church, a district schoolhouse, and a larger academy building, built in 1830. Houses in the district were built from the mid-18th century into the late 19th century, and feature Greek Revival, Georgian, and Federal architecture.

== See also ==
- National Register of Historic Places listings in Hampden County, Massachusetts
