= Blank Screens =

Studio album by The Static Age
- Released: September 19, 2006
- Recorded: 2006
- Genre: Indie rock
- Length: 44:01
- Label: ReIgnition Recordings
- Producer: Michael Birnbaum and Chris Bittner

The Static Age chronology
Neon Nights Electric Lives (2005)	Blank Screens (2006)

Professional ratings
Review scores
Source	Rating
AllMusic	link

Blank Screens is the second full-length release from Vermont band The Static Age. It was released on September 16, 2006, via ReIgnition Recordings and was produced by Michael Birnbaum and Chris Bittner.

== Track listing ==
1. "Blank Screens" – 4:15
2. "Skyscrapers" – 3:04
3. "Lights in the Attic" – 3:46
4. "Trauma" – 3:57
5. "Cherry Red" – 3:16
6. "The Bluebird Room" – 4:22
7. "Count the Dead" – 3:51
8. "Marilyn" – 4:29
9. "The Last Light in the West" – 7:14
10. "Trauma (Remixed by The Static Age and Ocelot Mthrfckrs)" - 5:29 (iTunes digital exclusive)

== Personnel ==
- Andrew Paley - Vocals, Guitar, Keyboards
- Adam Meilleur - Bass
- Tim Alek Mulley - Drums
- Sarah-Rose Cameron - Keyboards
