= Timothy Mather Cooley =

American pastor

Coat of Arms of Timothy Mather Cooley

Timothy Mather Cooley (March 13, 1772 – December 14, 1859) was an American pastor.

He was son of William Cooley, and was born at East Granville, Massachusetts on March 13, 1772. At his graduation he delivered an oration in Hebrew, and he retained a familiar acquaintance with this tongue through life. He graduated from Yale University in 1792. While he was a senior, one of the Berkeley Scholarships was awarded to him, and after graduation he remained in New Haven, Connecticut one year as resident scholar, and engaged in teaching.

He studied theology with Rev. Charles Backus of Somers, Connecticut, and in May 1795, he was licensed to preach. He preached a short time in his native town and in Salisbury, Connecticut. Receiving from both places a call to settle as pastor, he chose the smaller place with the smaller salary, and on February 3, 1796, he was ordained pastor of the church in East Granville. He continued to discharge in full the duties of this office, until 1854, when, having completed his 82nd year, was released from the charge of the pulpit, and a colleague was employed. He retained his activity until a fortnight before his death. In fulfilment of a promise exacted of him many years previous, a discourse was preached at his funeral by Rev. Dr. Sprague of Albany. This has since been published. (Albany, 1860, pp. 38, 8vo.)

Cooley married Content Chapman on May 6, 1796.

Soon after his settlement, Cooley opened a classical school in his own house, and continued it during most of his life. More than eight hundred youth have thus enjoyed the benefit of his personal tuition. He also superintended the studies of several young men preparing for the ministry. For 57 years he was an active and influential member of the board of trustees of Westfield Academy, and for 47 years he held the same relation to Williams College. Several of his sermons and addresses have been printed. The number of his publications, including his articles in the journals of the day, is not far from sixty. About twelve years ago, he prepared, with the assistance of Hon. James Cooley, a collection of the memoirs of all the members of the class of 1792, and in 1850 he presented the volume in manuscript to the Library of Yale College.

He died in East Granville on December 14, 1859, aged 87.
