= The Cost of Living (The Static Age album) =

Studio album by The Static Age
- Released: June 28, 2002; 2003 (re-release)
- Recorded: --
- Genre: Post-punk, Indie rock
- Length: 38:36
- Label: Primary Records/Red Dawn Records

The Static Age chronology
The Cost of Living (2002)	Neon Nights Electric Lives (2005)

The Cost of Living is the "full-length demo" from Vermont's The Static Age. It was initially self-released via the band's Primary Records before being re-released through Red Dawn Records.

== Track listing ==
1. "The Blackout" – 4:17
2. "Augustine" – 4:16
3. "Madeline" – 4:46
4. "Glitter" – 4:35
5. "Mother Mercy" – 5:31
6. "The Scream" – 4:50
7. "Porcelain" – 4:56
8. "The Echoes Upstairs" – 5:25

== Personnel ==
- Andrew Paley – Vocals, Guitar
- Marie Whiteford – Keyboards
- Adam Meilleur – Bass
- Bobby Hackney – Drums
