= Boston 6:58pm =

EP by Bane
- Released: October 2009
- Recorded: June 29–July 3, 2009
- Genre: Hardcore punk
- Length: 7:11
- Label: Triple-B Records

Bane chronology
The Note (2005)	Boston 6:58pm (2009)	Los Angeles 3:58pm (2009)

Boston 6:58pm is the first of two 7"'s in Bane's set of "world series" releases. It was released in America on Triple-B Records as Boston 6:58pm, in Europe on Hurry Up! Records as Dublin 11:58pm, and in conjunction with the 2nd 7" as a CD in Australia on Resist Records as Perth 7:58am, in Japan on Alliance Trax as Tokyo 7:58am, and in South America on Hurry Up! Records as Curitiba 7:58pm.

No.	Title	Length
1.	"The Bold and the Beautiful"	2:40
2.	"One Life To Live"	1:22
3.	"The Young and the Restless"	3:10
Total length:		7:11

Perth 7:58am/Curitiba 7:58pm
No.	Title	Length
1.	"The Bold and the Beautiful"	2:40
2.	"As The World Turns"	3:34
3.	"The Guiding Light"	1:52
4.	"Another World"	3:28
5.	"One Life To Live"	1:22
6.	"The Young and the Restless"	3:10
Total length:		16:06

Tokyo 7:58am Bonus Track
No.	Title	Length
7.	"Enjoy (Björk cover)"	3:21

== Personnel ==
- Aaron Bedard - vocals
- Aaron Dalbec - guitar
- Zach Jordan - guitar
- Brendan Maguire - bass
- Bob Mahoney - drums

=== Other contributors ===
- additional vocals - Mayra Montijo
- layout & design - Peter Chilton
- cover photography - Dan Gonyea
