= Dave Joyal =

American drummer

- Birth name: Dave Joyal
- Instrument(s): Drums, percussion
- Labels: Equal Vision, Drive-Thru, Metal Blade

Dave Joyal is an American musician and former member of Shai Hulud. Born in Vermont, he grew up in Essex devoting himself to drums at an early age. He uses and endorses Noble & Cooley Drums, Paiste Cymbals, Evans Drumheads and Pro-Mark Drumsticks. He has filled in on occasion for RCA recording artists, Young And Divine in 2010 and The Static Age in 2009. Dave Joyal is also a member of both post-hardcore band Silent Drive and metalcore band Drowningman.
