= Rogue Taxidermy (album) =

Studio album by Days N' Daze
- Released: August 24, 2013
- Genre: Folk punk
- Length: 47:01
- Label: self-released

Days N' Daze chronology
The Oogle Deathmachine (2013)	Rogue Taxidermy (2013)	Days N' Daze // Rail Yard Ghosts Split (2014)

Professional ratings
Review scores
Source	Rating
Punknews	3.5/5 stars

Rogue Taxidermy is the sixth studio album released by Houston, Texas folk punk band Days N' Daze. The album was self-released by the band in 2013, sold at their shows and online. The album has at various times been made available for free by the band.

== Track listing ==
No.	Title	Length
1.	"Rockabilly Impending Deathfuture"	2:35
2.	"Fuck It!"	3:06
3.	"Muddy Knees"	2:54
4.	"Call in the Coroner"	3:28
5.	"Misanthropic Drunken Loner"	3:32
6.	"Blue Jays"	2:47
7.	"Remnants of What People Used to Be"	2:55
8.	"Day Gaunts"	3:23
9.	"Fate of a Coward" (featuring Jessica Flynn)	2:55
10.	"Dazed From the Dazzle of Decadence and Constantly Reminded of Death" (instrumental)	2:25
11.	"1984"	2:11
12.	"DBS Out"	2:07
13.	"Tarnished Ol' Photograph"	2:28
14.	"Goodbye Lulu"	2:30
15.	"Perfectly Dysfunctional"	3:27
16.	"Post Party Depression"	3:53

== Personnel ==
Days N' Daze

- Jesse Sendejas- Vocals, Guitar, Banjo, Washboard, Mandolin, Drums
- Whitney Flynn- Vocals, Trumpet, Ukulele
- Geoff Bell- Washtub Bass, Vocals

Featured musicians

- Jessica Flynn- Vocals (track 9)

Other Personnel

- Susie Schaeffer- Album cover design
