= The Static Age =

American post punk band

- Origin: Burlington, Vermont
- Genres: Post-punk; alternative rock; indie rock
- Years active: 2001–present
- Labels: ReIgnition; The Platform Group; Tarantulas; Highwires; Flix; Uncle M; SBAM
- Members: Andrew Paley; Adam Meilleur; Joe Sowinski; Nico Deportago-Cabrera
- Website: thestaticage.com

The Static Age is an American post-punk band originally from Burlington, Vermont and now based in Chicago, IL. The band's style blends elements of post-punk, alternative, shoegaze, synth pop and indie rock and they have released five albums and a handful of EPs and singles as well as toured extensively across both North America and Europe.

== History ==
The Static Age began playing shows in their hometown in 2002 with original members Andrew Paley, Adam Meilleur, Bobby Hackney (now of Rough Francis), and Marie Whiteford.

The band's first major release was 2005's Neon Nights Electric Lives (produced by Matt Squire) released on Tarantulas Records/Platform Group/Fontana in March 2005. That album also featured remixes from AFI’s Jade Puget and Dave Walsh of The Explosion. The Blank Screens album followed in 2006 (produced by Birnbaum and Bittner) via ReIgnition Records. Other prior releases include 2004's "Amphibian" single, 2003's "The Past and Now" single (produced by Kurt Ballou of Converge), and 2003's "The Cost of Living," a 'full-length demo,' released by the band's own imprint Primary Records and the now defunct Boston-based label Red Dawn Records.

The band began playing shows in their hometown in 2002 with the likes of Hot Hot Heat, Interpol, Drowningman, and others, and then toured North America multiple times from 2003 through 2008, at various times on tour with AFI (who “hand picked” the band to join them on their Canadian tour and then again in the northeast US), The Explosion, Tiger Army, Street Dogs, Theo and the Skyscrapers (a tour which included a show at the Knitting Factory in New York with a then-unknown Lady Gaga), Silent Drive, Drowningman, and others.

During the 2005 tours, Hackney left the band and was temporarily replaced by Coby Linder of Say Anything before Tim Alek Mulley joined on drums. In 2007, Mulley was replaced by Dave Joyal also of Silent Drive and Drowningman.

In 2009, the band released the “i/o” EP on Germany-based Flix Records, and then toured Europe for the first time. Paley then relocated to Chicago in late 2009, bringing the studio equipment to a new space there and working on a new album with Chicago-based drummer, Joe Sowinski, while sending tapes to Meilleur for collaboration. That album, "In the City of Wandering Lights", was released on vinyl and digitally in April 2011 via Flix Records in Europe and Highwires in North America. The album was followed up by the addition of Rebekka Takamizu on guitar and keyboards and another tour across Europe, including shows in Eastern Europe.

The five-song EP "Mercies" was then released in 2012 on Uncle M in Europe and Highwires in North America, accompanied by a video for the song "Lady Now" directed by Paley’s brother Nick Paley. The band then returned to Europe and the UK for a tour with Slingshot Dakota. A split single with Germany's Featuring Yourself was released on April 19, 2013 in advance of their 2013 European tour together.

In 2016, the band toured across Europe again, including playing the Faine Misto Festival in Ukraine and dates in Russia. Tourmates at various points included Pears, Such Gold, and No Fun.

In 2020, the band released two new songs (“Recover” and a cover of The Chameleon UK’s “Fan and the Bellows”) for a split 7” with Love Equals Death on SBAM in Europe and Say-10 Records in the US. They then announced signing to SBAM for their next album and released another single “Traffic Dreams” in early 2022. They toured Denmark, Germany and Austria in October 2022 with new labelmates Snuff.

== Band members ==
- Andrew Paley - Voice, Guitars, Sequencing, Keyboards, Drums (founding member)
- Adam Meilleur - Bass (founding member)
- Joe Sowinski - Drums
- Nico Deportago-Cabrera - Guitar and Keyboards

== Past/Touring members ==
- Marie Whiteford - Keyboards (original member, 2002–2004)
- Sarah-Rose Cameron - Keyboards (2004–2006)
- Bobby Hackney - Drums (founding member, 2002–2005)
- Tim Alek Mulley - Drums (2006–2007)

Touring-Only Members

- Coby Linder of Say Anything - drums (touring member during 2005 tours)
- Eric Joseph Carlson - Guitar (touring member during 2007)
- Dave Joyal - Drums (touring member 2007–2009)

== Discography ==
=== Albums ===
- 2003: The Cost of Living (self-produced) - Primary Records / Red Dawn Records
- 2005: Neon Nights Electric Lives (produced by Matt Squire) - Tarantulas Records / The Platform Group
- 2006: Blank Screens (produced by Birnbaum and Bittner) - Reignition Records
- 2009: I/O (produced by Richard Palishesky) - Primary Records / Highwires (Digital), Flix Records (CD Version)
- 2011: In the City of Wandering Lights (produced by Richard Palishesky) - LP/Digital release - Highwires (US), Flix Records (Europe)
- 2012: Mercies - LP/Digital - Uncle M / Highwires

=== Demos ===
- 2002: The Blackout Demos - Self Released

=== Singles ===
- 2003: "The Past and Now" (produced by Kurt Ballou) - Primary Records / Red Dawn Records
- 2004: "Amphibian" (produced by Matt Squire) - Tarantulas Records
- 2020: "Recover" (split with Love Equals Death)
- 2022: "Traffic Dreams"

=== Remixes ===
- 2005: Airplanes - "Vertigo" remixed by Jade Puget (appears on "Neon Nights Electric Lives")
- 2005: Pakistan - "Amphibian" remixed by Daz (appears on "Neon Nights Electric Lives")
- 2005: Red Lips - "Amphibian" remixed by Christian Cambas (internet release)
- 2006: Head Over Heels - "Armory" remixed by DJ Bot (Purevolume release) 6
- 2006: Trauma - "Trauma" remixed by Ocelot Mthrfckrs (iTunes exclusive for "Blank Screens" release)
- 2008: Sirens - "Lights in the Attic" remixed by Christian Cambas (Devilock Records + "B-side" remix by Squash 84)
- 2010: Already Dead - "Already Dead" from I/O remixed by Christian Cambas (appears on Cambas' album "Beyond Suspicion")
