= Holding This Moment =

Compilation album by Bane
- Released: August 25, 1998
- Recorded: 1996–1998
- Genre: Hardcore punk
- Length: 27:33
- Label: Equal Vision Records
- Producer: Brian McTernan

Bane chronology
Holding This Moment (1998)	It All Comes Down to This (1999)

Holding This Moment is a collection of Bane's early 7" releases with songs about straight edge and the hardcore scene.

== Track listing ==
1. "In Pieces" – 2:19
2. "Count Me Out" – 2:30
3. "Both Guns Blazing" – 5:36
4. "Superhero" – 3:08
5. "At Best" – 2:09
6. "Scared" – 2:38
7. "Forked Tongue" – 4:12
8. "Every Effort Made/Lay The Blame" – 5:01

=== Original sources ===
This album is a compilation of songs released on previous 7" E.P.'s by Bane. Tracks 1–3 are from the Holding This Moment 7" (1998), tracks 4–6 are from the Free to Think, Free to Be 7" (1997), and tracks 7–8 are from the Bane 7" (1996), an album often referred to as the XXX 7".

"Both Guns Blazing" contains samples from the films The Good, the Bad, and the Ugly, Se7en and Unforgiven.

== Members ==
- Aaron Bedard – vocals
- Aaron Dalbec – guitar
- Zach Jordan – guitar
- Pete Chilton – bass
- Ben Chused – drums (tracks 1–3)
- Damon Bellorado – drums (tracks 4–8)
