= It All Comes Down to This (album) =

Studio album by Bane
- Released: November 2, 1999
- Recorded: June 6 – July 6, 1999; Austin Enterprises, Clinton, Massachusetts, U.S.
- Genre: Hardcore punk, melodic hardcore
- Length: 33:33
- Label: Equal Vision Records
- Producer: Steve Austin

Bane chronology
Holding This Moment (1998)	It All Comes Down to This (1999)	Give Blood (2001)

It All Comes Down to This is the first full-length album by hardcore punk band Bane, which focuses lyrically on loss and unity within the hardcore scene.

The album artwork tackled the subject of loss by reproducing photographs taken by journalists who had died in the Vietnam and Indochina wars. The photos have been called both graphically poignant and emotionally and visually thought-provoking.

To reinforce this imagery, the band placed mellow musical interludes at certain parts of the album – tracks 3 and 10 – to cause of a sudden mood of reflection before and after the savagery of the hardcore songs which dominate this recording.

The record release show for this album coincided with the Back to School Jam 3 on October 30, 1999 in Worcester, Massachusetts at the Palladium. The lineup for the show included Right Brigade, Dillinger Escape Plan, Boy Sets Fire, Bane, and Converge. Patrons attending this show were also able to purchase copies of Saves the Day's just released album Through Being Cool.

"Can We Start Again" was covered in 2013 by the electronicore band I See Stars.

== Track listing ==
All songs written by Bane.

1. "Fuck What You Heard" – 2:26
2. "Struck Down by Me" – 4:27
3. "Untitled" – 0:39
4. "The Paint Chips Away" – 1:50
5. "My Cross to Bear" – 4:45
6. "What Makes Us Strong" – 0:45
7. "Can We Start Again" – 3:19
8. "I Once Was Blind" – 4:19
9. "Untitled" – 0:39
10. "Place in the Sun" – 2:44
11. "Her Lucky Pretty Eyes" – 3:22
12. "A Bridge Too Far" – 4:16

== Credits ==
Bane

- Aaron Bedard – vocals
- Aaron Dalbec – guitar
- Zachary Jordan – guitar
- Pete Chilton – bass
- Nick Branigan – drums

Other musicians

- Steve Austin – oboe on track 12, vocals on track 8
- Kate O Eight – vocals on track 7

Production

- Recorded June 6 – July 6, 1999 at Austin Enterprises, Clinton, Massachusetts, U.S. by Steve Austin
- Mastered by Dave Merullo and Steve Austin at M Works, Cambridge, Massachusetts, U.S.
- Artwork layout by Jacob Bannon
- Inset photography courtesy Requiem: By the photographers who died in Vietnam and Indochina - Random House, New York
