= Granville, Massachusetts =

- Town
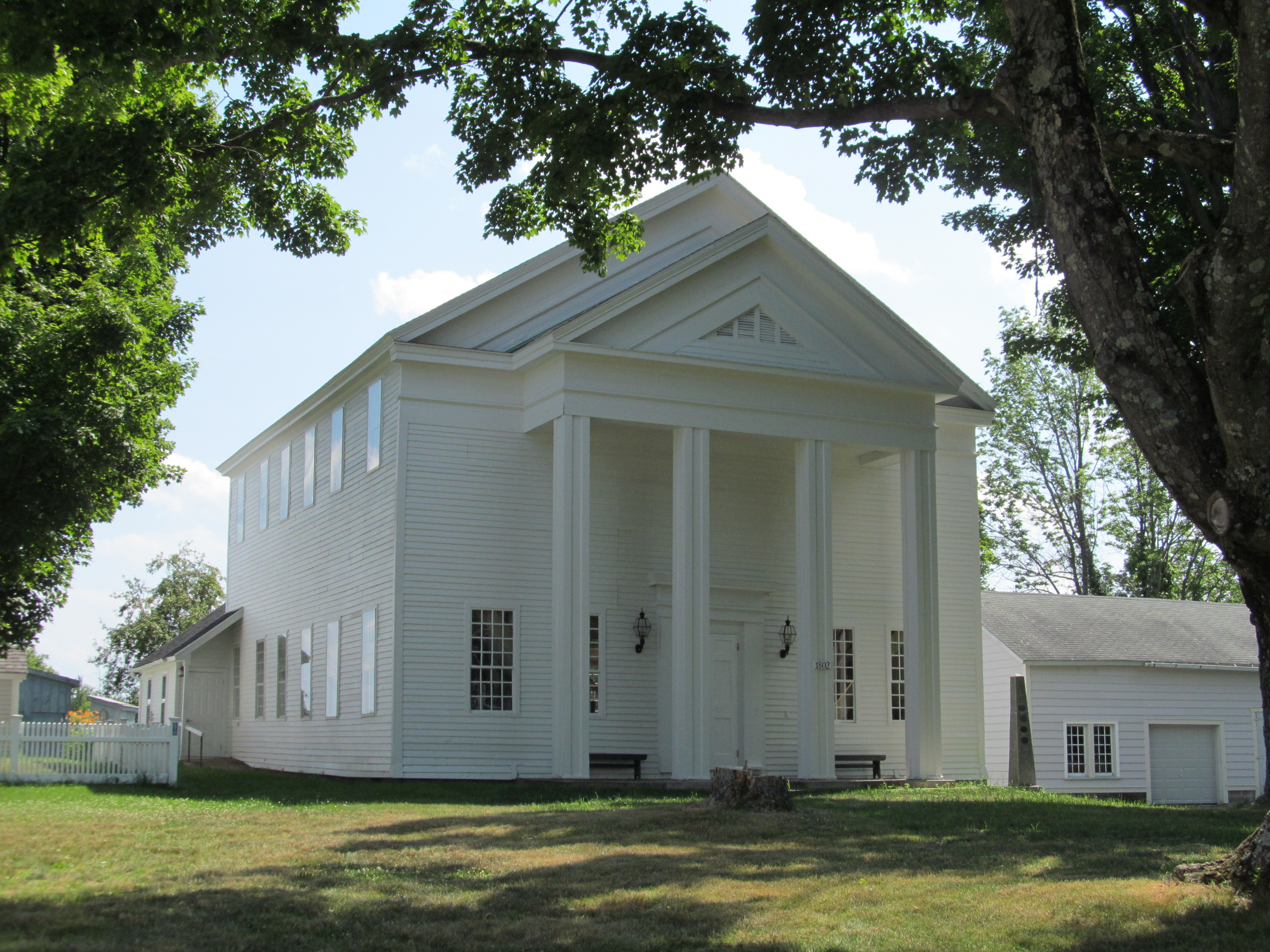
- Old Meeting House

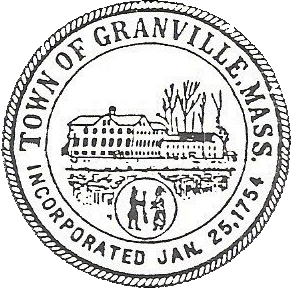
- Seal

- Location in Hampden County in Massachusetts
- Coordinates: 42°04′00″N 72°51′43″W
- Country: United States
- State: Massachusetts
- County: Hampden
- Settled: 1736
- Incorporated: 1754

Government
  - Type: Open town meeting

Area
  - Total: 43.0 sq mi (111.4 km^{2})
  - Land: 42.2 sq mi (109.3 km^{2})
  - Water: 0.81 sq mi (2.1 km^{2})
- Elevation: 686 ft (209 m)

Population (2020)
  - Total: 1,538
  - Density: 36.44/sq mi (14.07/km^{2})
- Time zone: UTC−5 (Eastern)
  - Summer (DST): UTC−4 (Eastern)
- ZIP Codes: 01034 (Granville); 01008 (Blandford)
- Area code: 413
- FIPS code: 25-26675
- GNIS feature ID: 0618183
- Website: www.townofgranville.net

Granville is a town in Hampden County, Massachusetts, United States. The population was 1,538 at the 2020 census. It is part of the Springfield, Massachusetts Metropolitan Statistical Area. The town is named for John Carteret, 2nd Earl Granville.

== History and description ==
Granville was first settled by English colonists in 1736 and was officially incorporated in 1754, after the end of the Indian wars in 1750. Early settlers could get a 100-acre (0.40 km^{2}) lot for free, providing they built a house and "put four acres in English hay". Perhaps the most famous resident of that era was Oliver Phelps, whose purchase of 6 million acres (24,000 km^{2}) in western New York (the Phelps and Gorham Purchase) following the American Revolutionary War remains the largest real estate purchase in US history. The population in Granville expanded quickly, peaking at 2,100 in 1810, when it rivaled Springfield. However, likely due to the rocky soil in New England, many settlers eventually migrated west, some establishing the town of Granville, Ohio.

Many historic homes dot Route 57, the main road through town. The village center, the old center, and West Granville center are all designated as historic districts listed on the National Register of Historic Places. Historic buildings include Granville's Old Meeting House (superb acoustics), the Stevenson house to its west, the West Granville Academy, and the West Granville Church. The village center features an old-fashioned country store, known for its cellar-aged cheese.

In addition to period architecture, Granville is the watershed for three reservoirs: Barkhamsted, the main source for the Hartford metropolitan district; Cobble Mountain, the main source for the city of Springfield; and Westfield, the main source for the city of Westfield, Massachusetts. Much of the land in town is owned by the various water districts. Granville also has a number of active apple orchards.

== Geography ==
Granville is in southwestern Hampden County, 18 miles (29 km) west of Springfield, 9 miles (14 km) southwest of Westfield, and 32 miles (51 km) east of Great Barrington. Massachusetts Route 57 is the main east–west route through the town, and Massachusetts Route 189 leads south from the town center to the Connecticut border. Hartford, Connecticut, is 25 miles (40 km) to the south via Route 189.

According to the United States Census Bureau, the town of Granville has a total area of 43.0 square miles (111.4 km^{2}), of which 42.2 square miles (109.3 km^{2}) are land and 0.81 square miles (2.1 km^{2}), or 1.87%, are water.

Granville is bordered on the north by Blandford and Russell, on the northeast by Westfield, on the east by Southwick, on the south by Granby, Connecticut, and Hartland, Connecticut, and on the west by Tolland.

== Demographics ==
Historical population
Year	Pop.	±%
1790	1,979	—
1850	1,305	−34.1%
1860	1,385	+6.1%
1870	1,293	−6.6%
1880	1,205	−6.8%
1890	1,061	−12.0%
1900	1,050	−1.0%
1910	781	−25.6%
1920	655	−16.1%
1930	674	+2.9%
1940	668	−0.9%
1950	740	+10.8%
1960	874	+18.1%
1970	1,008	+15.3%
1980	1,204	+19.4%
1990	1,403	+16.5%
2000	1,521	+8.4%
2010	1,566	+3.0%
2020	1,538	−1.8%
2022	1,528	−0.7%
Source: United States census records and Population Estimates Program data.

As of the census of 2000, there were 1,521 people, 556 households, and 409 families residing in the town. The population density was 36.0 inhabitants per square mile (13.9/km^{2}). There were 595 housing units at an average density of 14.1 per square mile (5.4/km^{2}). The racial makeup of the town was 98.69% White, 0.26% African American, 0.20% Asian, 0.39% from other races, and 0.46% from two or more races. Hispanic or Latino of any race were 0.66% of the population.

There were 556 households, out of which 36.9% had children under the age of 18 living with them, 63.7% were married couples living together, 6.8% had a female householder with no husband present, and 26.3% were non-families. Of all households 20.9% were made up of individuals, and 8.8% had someone living alone who was 65 years of age or older. The average household size was 2.73 and the average family size was 3.19.

In the town, the population was spread out, with 27.6% under the age of 18, 4.9% from 18 to 24, 31.1% from 25 to 44, 25.4% from 45 to 64, and 10.9% who were 65 years of age or older. The median age was 39 years. For every 100 females, there were 106.9 males. For every 100 females age 18 and over, there were 100.9 males.

The median income for a household in the town was $53,148, and the median income for a family was $59,219. Males had a median income of $42,273 versus $30,380 for females. The per capita income for the town was $22,315. About 1.8% of families and 3.4% of the population were below the poverty line, including 1.0% of those under age 18 and 9.8% of those age 65 or over.

== Library ==
The Granville public library was founded in 1894. In fiscal year 2008, the town of Granville spent 0.68% ($31,979) of its budget on its public library—some $18 per person.

== Education ==
Granville is part of the Southwick-Tolland-Granville Regional School District. Students attend Woodland School from grades K to 2, and Powder Mill School from grades 3 to 6. High school students attend Southwick Regional School from grades 7 to 12.

== Points of interest ==
- Granville State Forest
- Granville Center Historic District
- Granville Village Historic District
- Nobel & Cooley Drum Factory
- West Granville Historic District
- Wild Cat Aqueduct
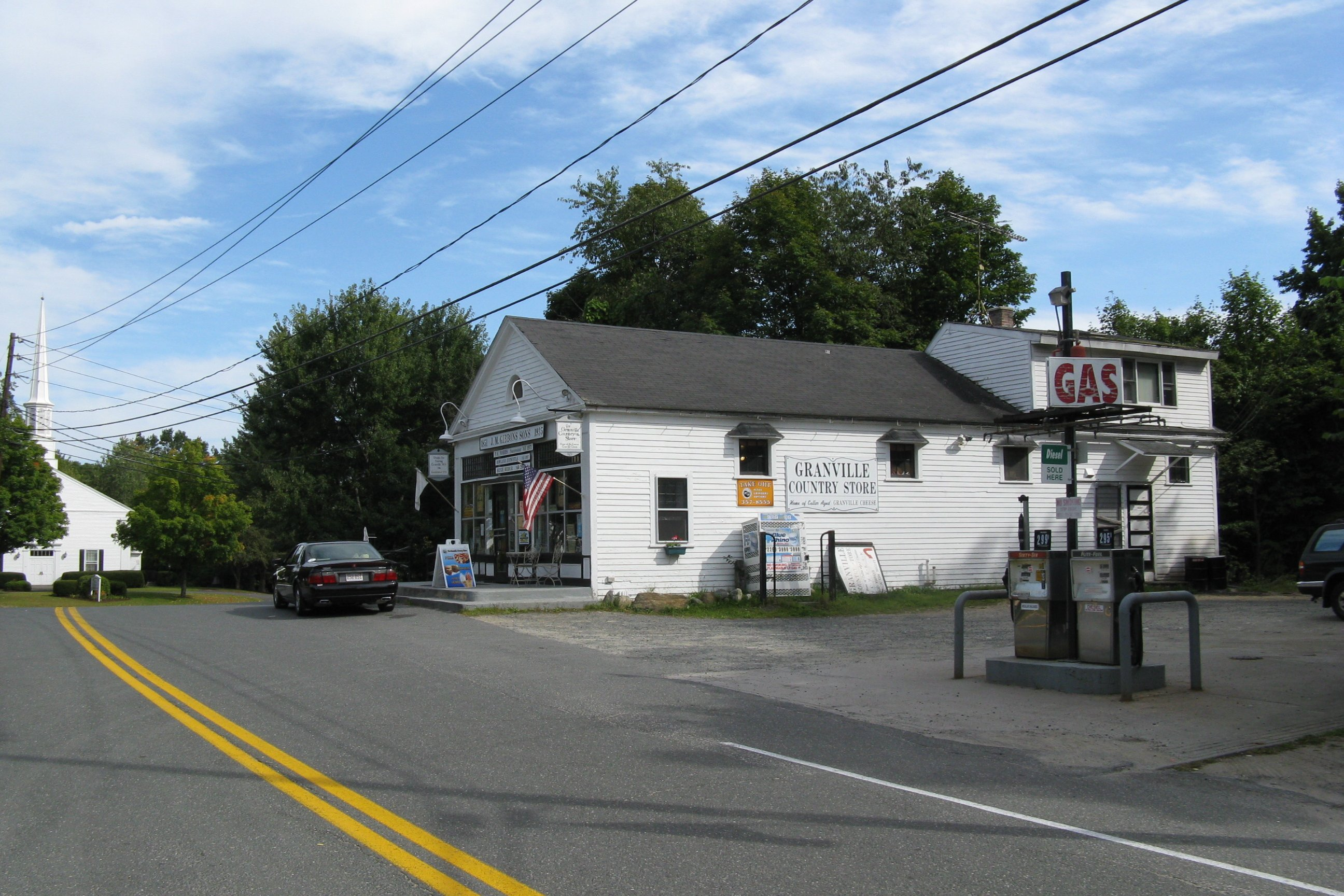
Granville Country Store

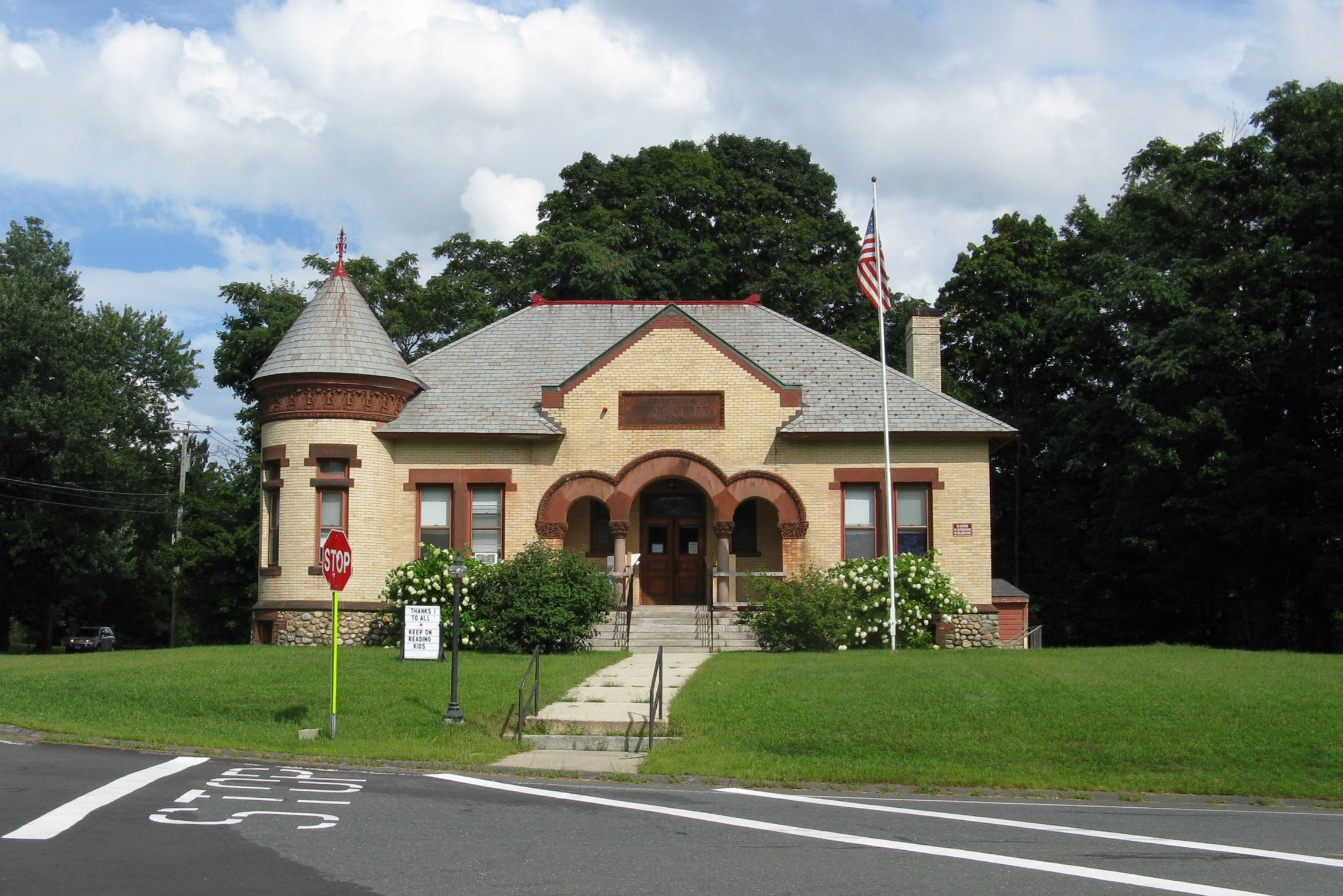
Granville Public Library

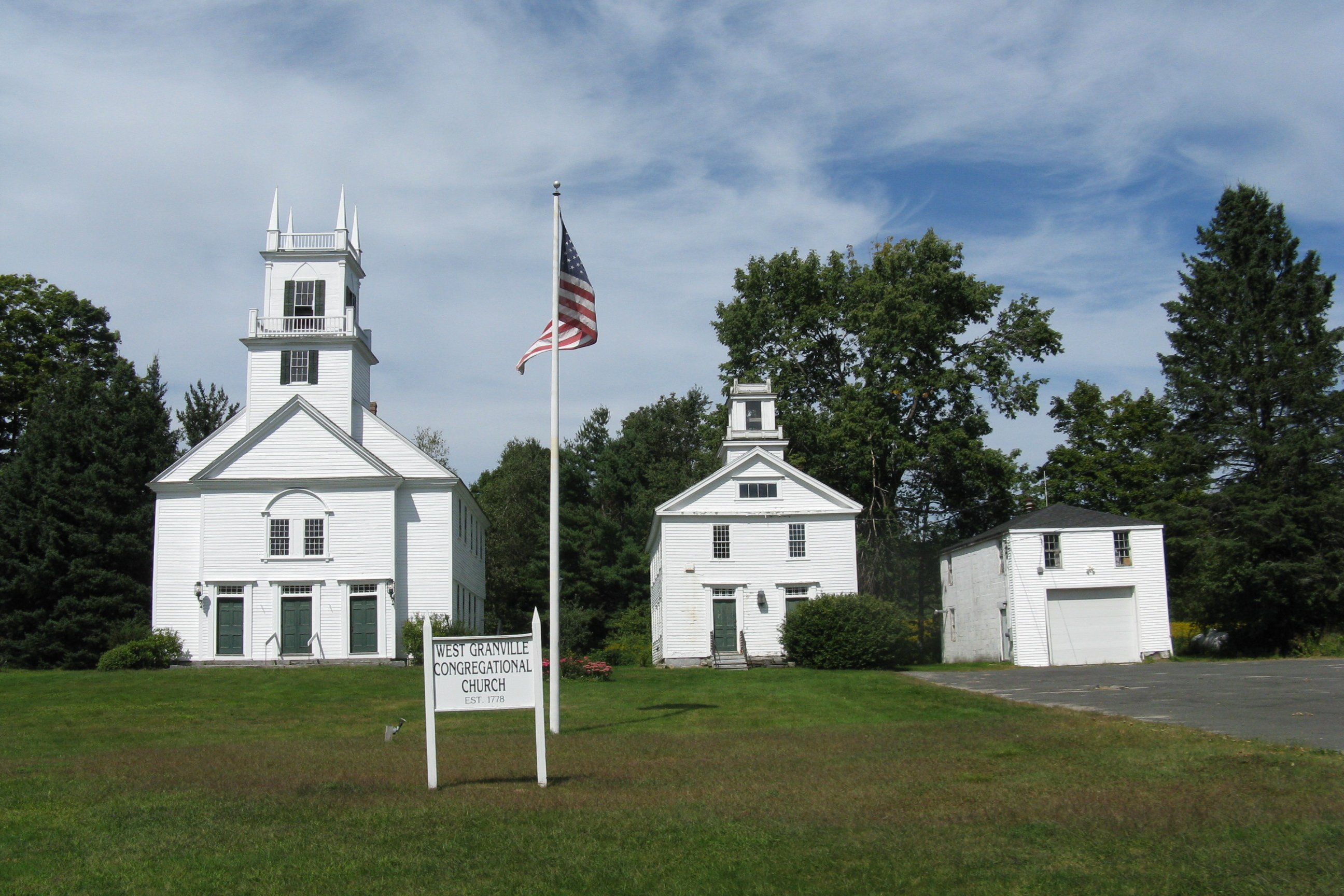
Congregational Church, West Granville

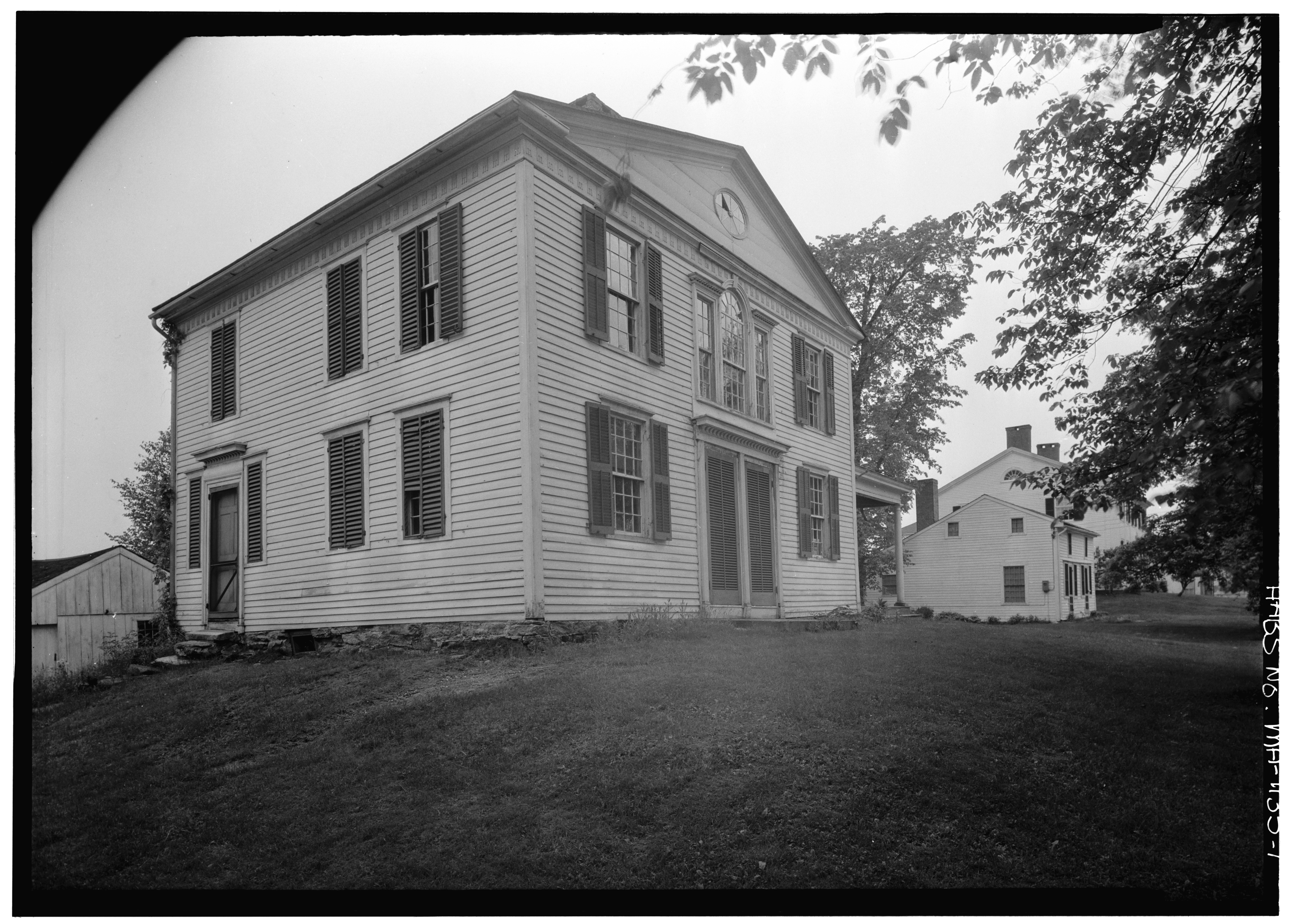
Historic Scott House

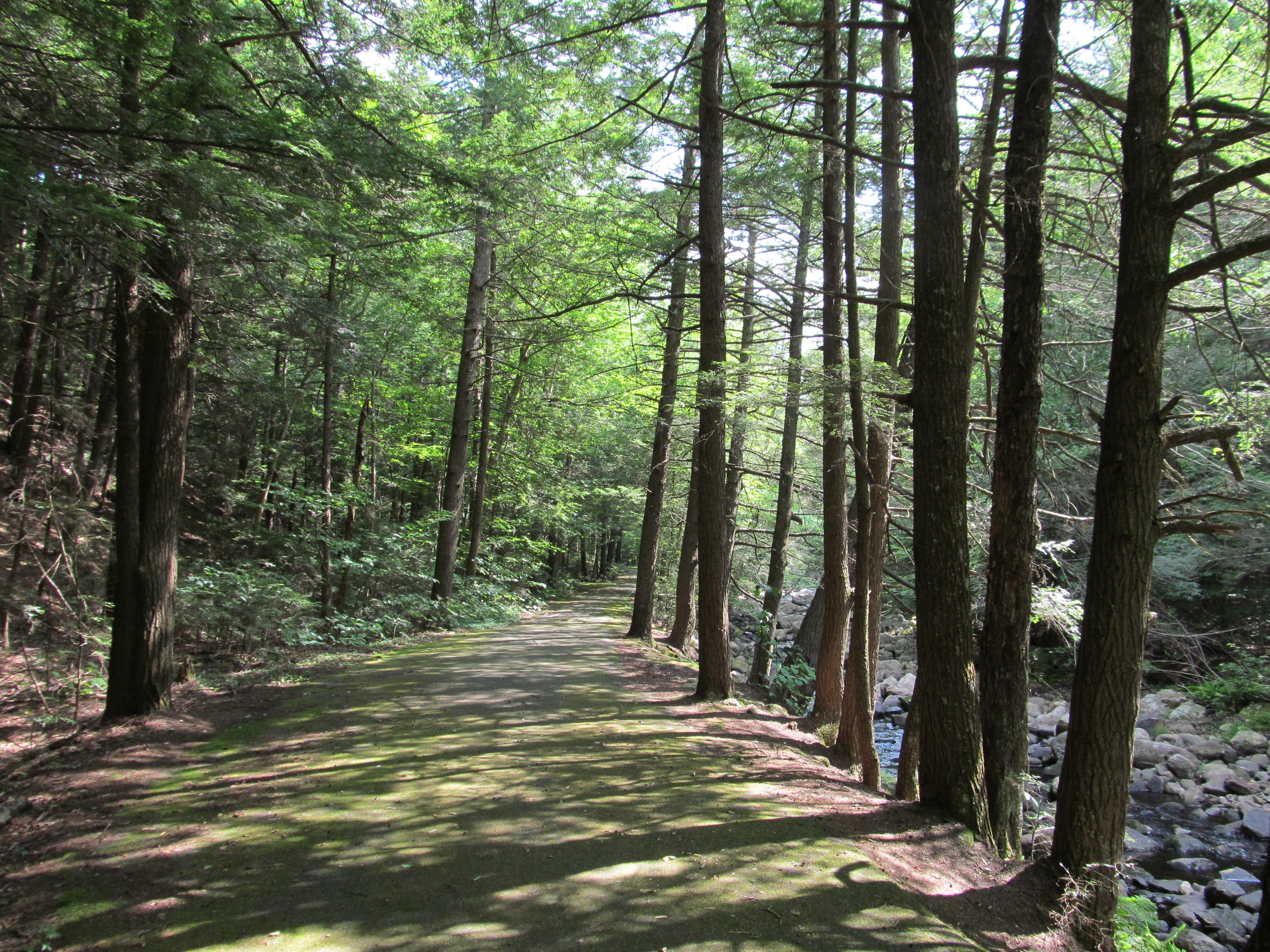
Granville State Forest

== Notable people ==
- Timothy Mather Cooley (1772 – 1859) Congregationalist pastor
- Israel Barlow (1806–1883), Latter-day Saint pioneer, co-founder of Nauvoo, Illinois
- Samuel L. M. Barlow, Sr. (1826–1889), politician
- Isaac Chapman Bates (1779–1845), politician
- Lemuel Haynes (1753–1833), African American religious leader
- Daniel Penfield (1759–1840), merchant, soldier, town founder
- Oliver Phelps (1749–1809), merchant and politician
- Austin Scott (1848–1922), historian and college president
- Seward Smith (1830–1886?), lawyer, politician, and judge
- Sabrina Tavernise (born 1971), journalist

== Politics ==
Granville, Massachusetts is a reliably Republican town. It has voted for the Republican presidential candidate in all 26 presidential elections since 1920. In 1924, Massachusetts native Calvin Coolidge received over 90% of the vote. From 1928 to 1972, even as the state of Massachusetts turned strongly Democratic, Granville remained strongly Republican, providing over 70% of the vote to the GOP in each election except one.

In 1964, Republican nominee Barry Goldwater won Granville by a 20-point margin despite losing Hampden County by a margin of almost 50 points. In 1996, Granville was the only town in Berkshire, Hampshire, Franklin, Worcester, or Hampden county in which Bob Dole received more votes than Bill Clinton.

Presidential election results

Granville city vote by party in presidential elections
Year	Democratic	Republican	Third Parties
2024	36.6% 357	60.9% 594	2.6% 25
2020	40.6% 635	57.1% 894	2.3% 36
2016	39.1% 335	54.2% 548	7.6% 75
2012	42.2% 377	56.2% 502	2.3% 21
2008	43.7% 381	53.0% 462	3.3% 29
2004	44.8% 374	53.8% 449	1.4% 12
2000	35.7% 275	55.1% 425	9.21% 71
1996	37.6% 263	44.9% 314	17.6% 123
1992	25.9% 196	41.1% 311	32.9% 249
1988	30.4% 199	69.2% 453	0.5% 3
1984	21.7% 132	78.1% 474	0.2% 1
1980	19.5% 121	63.7% 396	16.9% 105
1976	34.4% 208	62.3% 377	3.3% 20
1972	21.1% 114	77.4% 418	1.5% 8
1968	22.9% 102	70.0% 312	7.2% 32
1964	39.8% 175	60.0% 264	0.2% 1
1960	22.6% 109	76.3% 368	1.0% 5
1956	12.1% 55	85.2% 386	2.7% 12
1952	15.4% 73	82.5% 392	2.1% 10
1948	23.4% 90	75.3% 290	1.3% 5
1944	21.11% 68	76.70% 247	2.17% 7
1940	20.66% 69	78.44% 262	0.90% 3
1936	21.97% 69	72.29% 227	5.73% 18
1932	15.10% 50	76.13% 252	8.76% 29
1928	11.26% 33	88.40% 259	0.34% 1
1924	8.59% 17	90.40% 179	1.01% 2
1920	18.68% 34	81.32% 148	0.00% 0
1916	53.21% 58	44.95% 49	1.83% 2
1912	36.36% 44	47.11% 57	16.53% 20
1908	26.23% 32	68.85% 84	4.92% 6
1904	34.65% 44	63.78% 81	1.57% 2
1900	36.81% 53	61.81% 89	1.38% 2
1896	14.38% 23	79.38% 127	6.24% 10
1892	40.00% 82	55.61% 114	4.39% 9
1888	43.72% 94	54.42% 117	1.86% 4
1884	49.38% 120	49.79% 121	0.83% 2
1880	44.86% 109	55.14% 134	0.00% 0
1876	46.72% 121	53.28% 138	0.00% 0
1872	35.40% 57	64.60% 104	0.00% 0
1868	40.68% 107	59.32% 156	0.00% 0
1864	39.78% 107	60.22% 162	0.00% 0
1860	23.01% 55	60.67% 145	16.32% 39
1856	43.42% 122	54.80% 154	1.78% 5
