= Show Me the Blueprints =

Show Me The Blueprints

Studio album by Days N' Daze
- Released: May 1, 2020
- Genre: Folk punk
- Length: 37:21
- Label: Fat Wreck Cords

Days N' Daze chronology
| Songs We Recorded For Splits (2019) | Show Me The Blueprints (2020) | Show Me the Blueprints Demos (2024) |

Professional ratings
Review scores
| Source | Rating |
|---|---|
| Scene Point Blank | 1/5 stars |
| Punknews | 4.5/5 stars |

Show Me The Blueprints is the eighth studio album released by Houston, Texas folk punk band Days N' Daze. The album was released by the record label Fat Wreck Cords in 2020, sold at their shows and online. This album was the first album the band produced under a record label and it was also the first album recorded by the band in a professional studio.

== Track listing ==
| No. | Title | Length |
|---|---|---|
| 1. | "Flurry Rush" | 2:49 |
| 2. | "Ditches" | 2:42 |
| 3. | "Libriyum" | 3:24 |
| 4. | "Saboteurs" | 3:41 |
| 5. | "My Darling Dopamine" | 3:22 |
| 6. | "Rewind" | 2:15 |
| 7. | "Addvice" (Originally Crackpipe by Escape From The Zoo) | 3:21 |
| 8. | "None Exempt" | 3:50 |
| 9. | "Fast Track" | 2:24 |
| 10. | "Show Me the Blueprints" | 3:07 |
| 11. | "Goodbye Lulu Pt.2" | 6:21 |

== Personnel ==
Days N' Daze

- Jesse Sendejas – guitar, banjo, ukulele, acoustic bass, mandolin, washboard, vocals
- Whitney Flynn – vocals, trumpet, ukulele
- Geoff Bell – washtub bass
- Meagan Melancon – washboard

Other personnel

- Eliot Lozier – artwork
- John Carey – bass (track 4), chimes, organ, accordion (track 8), slide guitar (track 9), harmony vocals, recording engineer
- Fat Mike – electric bass, additional vocals, additional recordings
- Scott Sturgeon – vocals (track 11), hand claps (track 7)
- Gonzales – lacquer cut
- Veronica Sendejas – mandolin (tracks 4 and 5)
- Baz the Frenchman – piano (track 11), additional recordings
- D-Composers – producer
- El Hefe – trumpet (track 7)
