= Give Blood (Bane album) =

Studio album by Bane
- Released: October 31, 2001
- Recorded: August 2001
- Genre: Hardcore punk
- Length: 25:40
- Label: Equal Vision
- Producer: Brian McTernan

Bane chronology
It All Comes Down to This (1999)	Give Blood (2001)	The Note (2005)

Professional ratings
Review scores
Source	Rating
AllMusic	4/5 stars
Lambgoat	9/10

Give Blood is the second studio album by American hardcore punk band Bane, released in 2001. Lyrically, it focuses on the hardcore scene, as well as themes of dreams and loss.

== Track listing ==
1. "Speechless" – 1:24
2. "Some Came Running" – 2:37
3. "Snakes Among Us" – 3:58
4. "Release the Hounds" – 2:39
5. "What Holds Us Down" – 1:17
6. "Ante Up" – 2:37
7. "Bang the Drum Slowly" – 2:18
8. "Sunflowers and Sunsets" – 3:17
9. "The Big Gun Down" – 2:44
10. "Ali v. Frazier I" – 2:45

== Personnel ==
- Aaron Bedard – vocals
- Aaron Dalbec – guitar
- Zach Jordan – guitar
- Pete Chilton – bass
- Nick Branigan – drums
