= Bane (band) =

American hardcore punk band

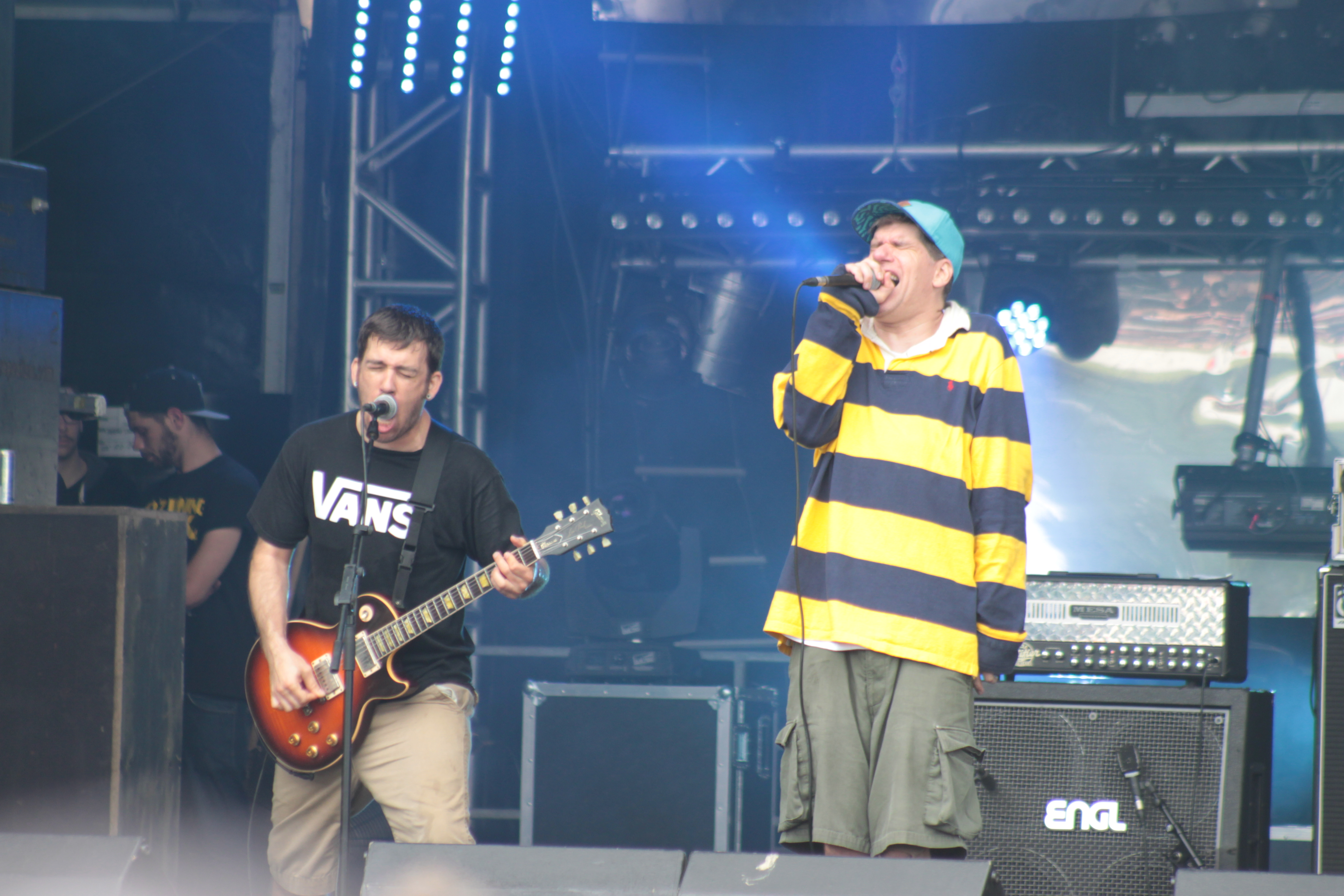
- Aaron Dalbec and Aaron Bedard live at Hellfest 2013

Background information
- Also known as: Gateway (1994)
- Origin: Worcester, Massachusetts, U.S.
- Genres: Hardcore punk, melodic hardcore
- Years active: 1994–2016; 2021; 2023–present
- Label: Equal Vision
- Spinoffs: Only Crime, Silent Drive
- Spinoff of: Converge
- Members: Aaron Bedard; Aaron Dalbec; Zach Jordan; Brendan Maguire; Bob Mahoney

Bane is an American hardcore punk band that began in 1995 as a side project between Aaron Dalbec (then of Converge) and Damon Bellorado. Dalbec approached Matt Firestone to sing and they played under the moniker of Gateway for a few shows, before Firestone parted ways to focus on other projects. Dalbec then approached Aaron Bedard (who had previously sung for the Worcester, Massachusetts hardcore band Backbone) about singing for Bane. They went into the studio in December 1995 with a few friends and released a five-song demo. The next year saw the release of their first EP, and many shows throughout central Massachusetts. In early 1997, Bane released Free to Think, Free to Be EP, and in 1998 the band released the Holding This Moment 7" and CD collection, and embarked upon their first US tour. Like many other hardcore bands, Bane are known for their promotion of tolerance and unity within the scene.

In 2014, Bane released their final album, Don't Wait Up, with the band stating that they still plan to tour.

== History ==
The band was founded in 1994 under the name Gateway. It was originally intended to be only a side project to Aaron Dalbec's main band Converge. In 1995 singer Aaron Bedard was asked to take over frontman duties. They quickly recorded a first demo, which contained five songs. Pete Chilton was added as bassist while Zach Jordan joined the band as second guitarist. Damon Bellorado, also a member of Converge, took over drumming duties.

In May 1996, Bane released the EP Forked Tongue and in 1997, Free to Think, Free to Be followed. Both EPs appeared on Life Records. It was around this time that drummer Bellorado left the band in order to concentrate fully on Converge. Bellorado was briefly replaced by Ten Yard Fight drummer Ben Chused, before he was replaced in mid-1998 by the 19-year-old Nick Branigan (Close Call). A tour followed the release of Holding This Moment, which was actually a compilation of previously released EPs. In addition, the band held a US tour starting with Saves the Day.

The album It All Comes Down to This was recorded in June 1999 in Austin Enterprises in Clinton, Massachusetts. The album was released on Equal Vision Records. In 2000, a tour followed by North America with Death by Stereo and Adamantium, as well as performances in Europe. In early September 2000, the band went into the studio again, where Converge Member Kurt Ballou worked as a producer to record two songs for a split release with Adamantium, which appeared on Indecision Records. Their second album Give Blood, which was released in 2001 was recorded and produced by Brian McTernan in Beltsville, Maryland. The release was followed with a tour of the USA along with Agnostic. In 2003, drummer Branigan left the band and was replaced by Bob Mahoney. Bane followed with another tour of the USA, as well as a two-week tour of Japan in April 2004.

In 2005 the band then went into the Salad Days Studios to record their next album titled The Note with producer McTernan, which appeared on Equal Vision Records. In March 2005, the band held a US tour with Comeback Kid and With Honor. In 2014, Bane released their final album, Don't Wait Up, with the band stating that they still plan to tour. They played their last show on June 18, 2016, at the Worcester Palladium.

Bane reunited for a surprise appearance at a benefit show on July 2, 2021, in tribute to former band member Brendan "Stu" Maguire, who died due to pancreatic cancer on June 27, 2021. The band played beside fellow bands The Bouncing Souls, Sick of It All, H_{2}O, and Rebuilder. In early February of 2023 Bane began a "countdown" on their social media with each day posting a single letter of the band's name. Speculation from fans expected various outcomes such as a full reunion, a repressing of their discography and an appearance at that year's Furnace Fest. In the early hours of February 7, 2023 Bane announced a reunion for a two night event held at Roadrunner in Boston.

== Influences ==
They have cited influences including Unbroken, YDI, Chain of Strength, Void, Hatebreed, Burn, Underdog, Youth of Today, Rites of Spring, Minor Threat, the Cro-Mags, Embrace, Walter Schreifels's work in Quicksand and Dave Smalley's work in Dag Nasty, All and Down by Law.

== Straight edge ==
In an early album Bane claimed straight edge, however it was never their main lyrical focus. The current original members are straight edge; Bob Mahoney and Stu are not. They still perform early songs with straight edge references, such as "Count Me Out" which includes the lyric "Just like this X on the back of my hand, I'm not going nowhere". However the lyrics to the song "Wasted On The Young", on Bane's album The Note can be interpreted as criticism of people who ignorantly claim straight edge too early in their life.

== Members ==
=== Current ===
- Aaron Bedard – vocals (1995–2016, 2021, 2023–present), rhythm guitar (1994–1995)
- Aaron Dalbec – lead guitar (1994–2016, 2021, 2023–present)
- Zach Jordan – rhythm guitar (1995–2016, 2021, 2023–present)
- James Siboni – bass (2014–2016, 2021, 2023–present)
- Bob Mahoney – drums (2003–2016, 2021, 2023–present)

=== Former ===
- Pete Chilton – bass (1994–2007, 2015)
- Brendan "Stu" Maguire – bass (2008–2012; died 2021)
- Chris Linkovich – bass (2012–2014)
- Damon Bellorado – drums (1995–1997)
- Matt Firestone – vocals (1995–1996)
- Ben Chused – drums (1997–1998)
- Nick Branigan – drums (1998–2003)

=== Guest musicians ===
- Kurt Ballou – guitar

== Discography ==
=== Studio albums ===
- It All Comes Down to This (1999, Equal Vision)
- Give Blood (2001, Equal Vision)
- The Note (2005, Equal Vision)
- Don't Wait Up (2014, Equal Vision)

=== Compilation albums ===
- Holding This Moment (1998, Equal Vision)

=== Extended plays ===
- Bane/Adamantium Split 7" (2001, Indecision)
- Ten Years Plus E.P. (2006, Equal Vision)
- Tokyo 7:58am (2009, Alliance) (Note: Tokyo 7:58am was also released as Perth 7:58am and Curitiba 7:58pm, and compiles the tracks found on Boston 6:58pm and Los Angeles 3:58pm.)
- Boston 6:58pm (2009, Triple-B) (Note: Boston 6:58pm was released internationally as Dublin 11:58pm.)
- Los Angeles 3:58pm (2009, 6131) (Note: Los Angeles 3:58pm was released internationally as Rome 12:58am.)

=== Compilation contributions ===
- They Came From Massachusetts (1996, Big Wheel Recreation) – Both Guns Blazing
- All Systems Go! (2000, Opened Handed Records/UnderEstimated Records) – Just How Much (Chain of Strength cover)
- Atticus: Dragging the Lake II (2003) – Some Came Running
- Our Impact Will Be Felt: A Tribute to Sick of It All (2007, Abacus Recordings) – We Stand Alone
- At Both Ends (2009, At Both Ends Hardcore Magazine) – 1. Non-Negotiated 2. Struck Down By Me (re-recording)
- America's Hardcore Volume 2 (2012, Triple-B Records) – Satan's Son
