= The Chuck Dukowski Sextet =

American avant garde band

Chuck Dukowski Sextet
- Genres: Avant-garde • psychedelic rock • alternative rock • post-hardcore • punk rock
- Years active: 2002–present
- Labels: Org Music, Nice & Friendly Records
- Members: Chuck Dukowski; Lora Norton; Milo Gonzalez; Ashton Slater
- Past members: Lynn Johnston; Bill Stinson; Tony Tornay

The Chuck Dukowski Sextet (or CD6) was a band featuring former Black Flag bassist Chuck Dukowski. The band was called a sextet even though they only had four members.

== History ==
Dukowski wanted to start playing again so he began playing with a drummer in December 2012. He invited his wife, Lora Norton, to contribute vocals and after a few years his step-son Milo Gonzalez joined as guitarist at the age of sixteen.

Dukowski has said that CD6 is the most collaborative band he has been in since Würm with each member having a say in songwriting although Lora handles the lyric writing.

The band's first album, Eat My Life, was released on Dukowski's own label Nice & Friendly Records. A second album, Reverse the Polarity, was also released on Nice & Friendly Records.

Org Music approached Dukowski about collaborating with the musician on his current projects in late 2010. In 2012, the label released the Chuck Dukowski Sextet's third album, Haunted, as well as the split 7-inch single “Sweet Honey Pie” b/w “My War,” pairing the Sextet with Mike Watt + The Missingmen.

== Members ==
Current

- Chuck Dukowski – bass, guitars
- Lora Norton – vocals
- Milo Gonzalez – guitars
- Ashton Slater – drums

Former

- Lynn Johnston – saxophone, clarinet
- Bill Stinson – drums
- Tony Tornay – drums

== Discography ==
- Eat My Life (2006)
- Reverse the Polarity (2007)
- Haunted (2012)
