= Don't Wait Up (album) =

Studio album by Bane
- Released: May 13, 2014
- Recorded: 2013–2014
- Genre: Melodic hardcore
- Length: 31:05
- Label: Equal Vision

Bane chronology
Los Angeles 3:58pm (2009)	Don't Wait Up (2014)

Don't Wait Up is the fourth and final studio album by American hardcore punk band Bane. It is their first studio album in 9 years.

== Track listing ==
1. "Non-Negotiable" – 2:36
2. "All the Way Through" – 3:16
3. "Calling Hours" (featuring Patrick Flynn of Have Heart, Walter Delgado of Rotting Out, David Wood of Down to Nothing and Reba Meyers of Code Orange) – 5:00
4. "Park St." – 2:20
5. "What Awaits Us Now" – 1:27
6. "Hard to Find" – 3:04
7. "Lost at Sea" – 2:18
8. "Post Hoc" – 2:29
9. "Wrong Planet" – 4:18
10. "Final Backwards Glance" – 4:22

== Band members ==
- Aaron Bedard – vocals
- Aaron Dalbec – guitar, vocals
- Zach Jordan – guitar, vocals
- Pete Chilton – bass, vocals
- Bob Mahoney – drums, vocals
