= Neon Nights Electric Lives =

Neon Lights Electric Lives

Studio album by The Static Age
- Released: March 23, 2005
- Genre: Post-punk, indie rock
- Length: 42:16
- Label: Tarantulas Records/The Platform Group (US)
- Producer: Matt Squire

The Static Age chronology
The Cost of Living (2002)	Neon Lights Electric Lives (2005)	Blank Screens (2006)

Neon Nights Electric Lives is the first proper full-length release from Vermont's The Static Age. Though The Cost of Living recordings predated it, those are considered the band's demos. A limited version of Neon Nights Electric Lives was released on October 19, 2004 and sold only on tours, but a full release came on March 23, 2005, via Tarantulas Records. The extended album also includes remixes from Jade Puget of AFI and Dave Walsh of The Explosion/The Loved Ones, and a vinyl reissue of the album was released in March 2014 on Highwires.

== Track listing ==
No.	Title	Length
1.	"Vertigo"	6:08
2.	"Amphibian"	4:00
3.	"Armory"	4:35
4.	"Ghosts"	4:33
5.	"Saltsick"	4:35
6.	"It Never Seems to Last"	4:14
7.	"Canopy"	6:25
8.	"Airplanes ("Vertigo" remix by Jade Puget of AFI)"	3:29
9.	"Pakistan ("Amphibian" remix by Daz Walsh of The XPLSN)"	4:18
Total length:		42:16

== Personnel ==
- Andrew Paley - Voice, Guitars
- Adam Meilleur - Bass
- Bobby Hackney - Drums
- Marie Whiteford - Keyboards
- Produced, Engineered and Mixed by Matt Squire
- Mastered by UE Nastasi at Sterling Sound/NYC
- Art & Design by Ryan Johnson, with Andrew Paley and Tim Presley
- Released on Tarantulas Records in March, 2005
