= Tarantulas Records =

Punk rock record label

- Founded: 2002
- Country of origin: United States

Tarantulas Records was a punk rock record label established in 2002. It was generally owned by the band The Explosion and run by their manager Rama Mayo (also of the label Big Wheel Recreation) as well as other members of bands involved in the label, and some releases were distributed by The Platform Group/Fontana. The most prominent and active bands amongst the Tarantulas (besides the Explosion) were The Distillers, The Bronx, The Static Age, and Darker My Love. The label/collective ceased to be in 2005/2006 due to disagreements with distributor The Platform Group and other tensions.

== Artists ==
- The Explosion
- The Lot Six
- The Bronx
- The Faux
- The Tonsils
- The Static Age
- Spitzz
- Darker My Love
- The Distillers

== Releases ==
- TR-001: The Tonsils - s/t (2002)
- TR-002: The Explosion / The Tonsils - split 7-inch (2003)
- TR-003: The Explosion - "Sick of Modern Art" EP (2003)
- TR-004: The Bronx - "Bats!" EP (2003)
- TR-005: The Faux - s/t EP (2003)
- TR-006: The Lot Six - "Major Fables" CD/LP (2003)
- TR-007: The Bronx - s/t LP (2004)
- TR-008: The Distillers - "Coral Fang" LP (2004)
- TR-009: Spitzz - "Sick, Savage, And Sensual" CD (2004)
- TR-010: The Explosion - "Red Tape" EP (2004)
- TR-011: Darker My Love - "EP" (2004)
- TR-012: The Static Age - "Neon Nights Electric Lives" (2005)
- TR-014: The Static Age - "Amphibian" CD Single (2004)
- TR-015: The Explosion - "Black Tape" LP (2004)
- TR-016: Darker My Love - "Summer is Here" CD Single (2005)

== See also ==
- List of record labels
