= The Note (album) =

Studio album by Bane
- Released: May 17, 2005
- Recorded: January 2005
- Genre: Hardcore punk
- Length: 28:05
- Label: Equal Vision Records
- Producer: Brian McTernan

Bane chronology
Give Blood (2001)	The Note (2005)	Boston 6:58pm (2009)

Professional ratings
Review scores
Source	Rating
Punk News	4/5 stars

The Note is an album released in the Spring of 2005 by hardcore band Bane. The album consists of a deeper, more mature sound than that of previous albums.

== Track listing ==
1. "Woulda, Coulda, Shoulda" – 2:49
2. "Pot Committed" – 3:28
3. "One for the Boys" – 2:07
4. "Hoods Up" – 2:01
5. "End with an Ellipsis" – 3:29
6. "My Therapy" – 2:24
7. "Don't Go" – 2:37
8. "Wasted on the Young" – 3:41
9. "What Keeps Us Here" – 1:42
10. "Swan Song" – 3:48

== Band members ==
- Aaron Bedard - Vocals
- Aaron Dalbec - Guitar
- Zach Jordan - Guitar (also contributed to production)
- Pete Chilton - Bass (also contributed to album art)
- Bob Mahoney - Drums

== Other contributors ==
- Brian McTernan - Production and engineering
- Oliver Chapoy - Additional engineering
- David Manganaro - Illustrations
