= Silent Drive =

- Origin: Worcester, Massachusetts, United States
- Genres: Post-hardcore
- Years active: 2003–present
- Label: Equal Vision
- Spinoff of: Bane, Ink Cartridge Funeral
- Members: Zach Jordan; Nick Van Someren; Pete Chilton; Dave Joyal

Silent Drive is an American post-hardcore band from Worcester, Massachusetts, United States. The band was formed from members of Ink Cartridge Funeral, Bane, Dasai, and Drowningman. The band was signed to Equal Vision Records, and toured Internationally in the US, UK, Japan, Europe, and Canada both before and after the release of their 2004 album, Love is Worth It.

The song "4/16" appeared on the soundtrack of the game Burnout 3 by EA Games.

In November 2021, the band announced via Facebook their new album, Fairhaven, which was released on Equal Vision in June 2022.

== Members ==
Current

- Zach Jordan – vocals (2003–present)
- Nick Van Someren – guitar (2003–present)
- Pete Chilton – bass (2003–present)
- Dave Joyal – drums (2003–present)

Former

- Andy Kyte – guitar (2003)
- Nick Branigan – drums (2003)

== Discography ==
=== Studio Albums ===
- Love Is Worth It (2004)
- Fairhaven (2022)

=== EPs ===
- Rock H Design (2003)
