= USRC Ashuelot =

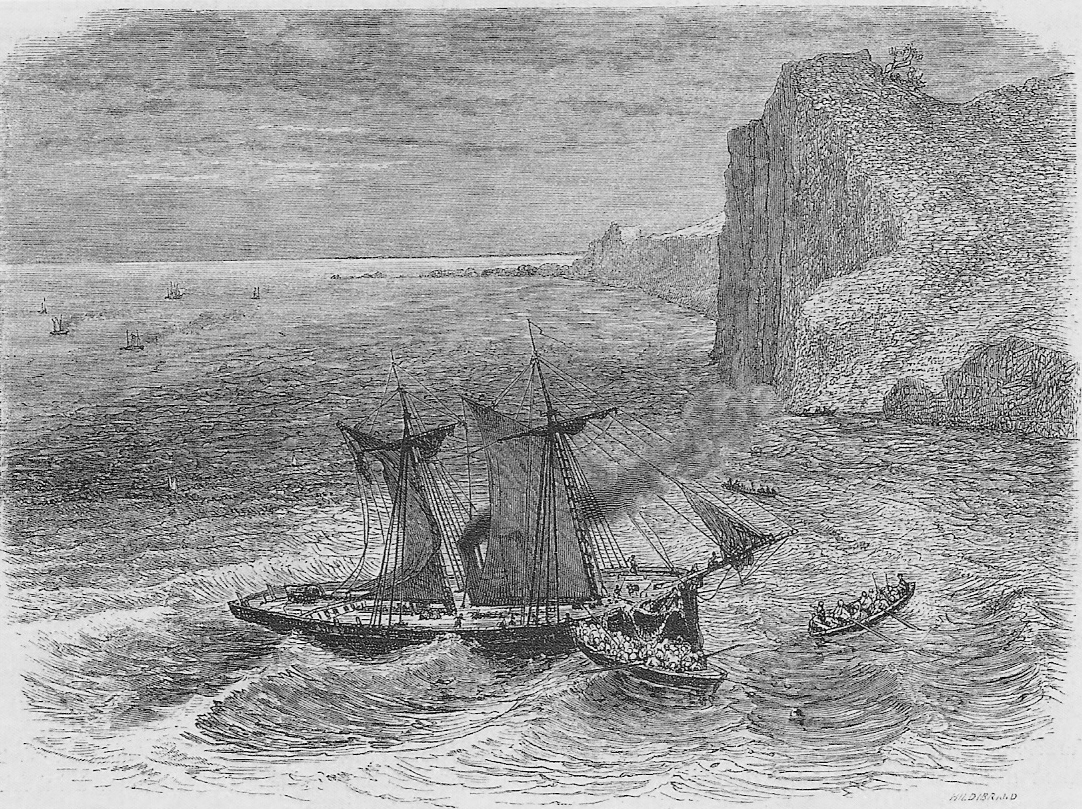
- Takao, formerly Ashuelot, in the process of being abandoned during the Battle of Miyako Bay, 1869

History
- Name: USRC Ashuelot
- Namesake: A river and town in New Hampshire
- Operator: United States Revenue Cutter Service
- Builder: John Englis
- Cost: $103,000
- Launched: 8 Jul 1863
- Commissioned: 1864
- Decommissioned: 30 Apr 1867
- In service: Revenue Service: 1863–30 Apr 1867; Merchant: 1867–69
- Fate: Scuttled (by burning) during Battle of Miyako Bay, Japan, 1869

General characteristics
- Class & type: Pawtuxet-class cutter
- Displacement: 350 tons
- Length: 130 ft (40 m)
- Beam: 26 ft 6 in (8.08 m)
- Draft: 11 ft (3.4 m)
- Depth of hold: 11 ft (3.4 m)
- Propulsion: 1 × two-cylinder oscillating steam engine; single 8 ft (2.4 m) screw
- Speed: About 12 knots
- Complement: 7 officers, 34 enlisted
- Armament: 1 × 30-pound Parrott rifle; 5 × 24-pound howitzers

USRC Ashuelot was a Pawtuxet-class screw steam revenue cutter built for the United States Revenue Marine during the American Civil War.

Ashuelot was homeported in Maine and later in Charleston, South Carolina during her brief career with the Revenue Marine. In 1866, she played an important role in the prevention of an armed raid on Canada by the Fenian Brotherhood.

Sold into merchant service in 1867 due to dissatisfaction with her machinery, Ashuelot later voyaged to Japan, operating under the names Takao and Kaiten No.2. She was destroyed in the Battle of Miyako Bay in 1869.

== Construction and design ==
Ashuelot was one of six Pawtuxet-class screw schooners ordered by the Treasury Department in 1863 for the United States Revenue Marine. She was built in New York City by John Englis, from whose yard she was launched on 8 July 1863. Englis was later awarded a bronze medal by the American Institute for a model of the vessel, "a trophy valued because of the great competition then existing in that department of American ship-building".

Ashuelot was 130 feet (40 m) long, with a beam of 26 feet 6 inches (8.08 m) and both hold depth and draft of around 11 feet (3.4 m). Like the other ships of her class, her contract called for a hull of oak, locust and white oak, strengthened with diagonal iron bracing. Her two-cylinder oscillating engine, built by New York's Novelty Iron Works, drove a single 8-foot (2.4 m) diameter screw propeller. Ashuelot's speed is unrecorded but was probably similar to the 12 knots achieved by her sister ship USRC Kankakee. She was topsail schooner-rigged for auxiliary sail power.

Ashuelot's armament consisted of a single 30-pounder Parrott rifle pivot gun, and five 24-pounder howitzers, one mounted in a pivot aft. She was crewed by a complement of seven officers and 34 enlisted men.

== Service history ==
The exact date on which Ashuelot entered service is not known, but The New York Times reports the vessel departing New York on a cruise on 28 November 1864. On 21 December 1864 she was ordered to her first homeport of Eastport, Maine.

In April 1866, Ashuelot played a role in the thwarting of an armed raid on Campobello Island, New Brunswick, by a group of about 700 members of the Fenian Brotherhood who had gathered in Maine for the purpose. The raiders were "sorely discouraged" after Ashuelot intercepted the brig Prey, which was loaded with ammunition and a large quantity of weapons "of the finest and deadliest description" intended for use in the raid.

In September 1866, Ashuelot underwent repairs at Portland, Maine. On the 7th, she was transferred to her new homeport of Charleston, South Carolina, reportedly arriving there on the 27th, as a replacement for her sister ship Kewanee. On 15 November, Ashuelot towed the lightship for Frying Pan Shoals, North Carolina, back to its station after the latter vessel had undergone repairs at Charleston.

Not long after, the Revenue Marine decided to divest itself of a number of the Pawtuxet-class cutters as their engines were deemed "too complicated". Departing Charleston on 27 April 1867, Ashuelot was decommissioned at New York on 30 April and laid up at Staten Island on 7 May. On 20 June, she was sold to J. C. Fuller of New York for the sum of $28,300.

Ashuelot was subsequently sent to Japan, where she was renamed Takao and later, reportedly, Kaiten No.2. She was destroyed by her own crew to prevent capture during the Battle of Miyako Bay in 1869.
