= USRC Pawtuxet =

History
- Name: USRC Pawtuxet
- Namesake: A river and village in Rhode Island
- Operator: United States Revenue Cutter Service
- Builder: Thomas Stack (New York)
- Cost: $103,000
- Launched: 7 Jul 1863
- Commissioned: 1864–May? 1867

General characteristics
- Class & type: Pawtuxet-class cutter
- Displacement: 350 tons
- Length: 130 ft (40 m)
- Beam: 26 ft 6 in (8.08 m)
- Draft: 11 ft (3.4 m)
- Depth of hold: 11 ft (3.4 m)
- Propulsion: 1 × two-cylinder oscillating steam engine; single 8 ft (2.4 m) screw
- Sail plan: Topsail schooner
- Speed: About 12 knots
- Complement: 7 × officers, 34 enlisted
- Armament: 1 × 30-pound Parrott rifle; 5 × 24-pound howitzers

USRC Pawtuxet was a Pawtuxet-class screw steam revenue cutter built for the United States Revenue Marine during the American Civil War.

Pawtuxet appears to have spent her brief career with the Revenue Marine working in and around Massachusetts and Rhode Island. After less than three years as a revenue cutter, she was sold in 1867 due to dissatisfaction with her machinery, and earmarked for merchant service in China. Nothing further is known of her career.

== Construction and design ==
Pawtuxet was one of six Pawtuxet-class screw schooners ordered by the Treasury Department in 1863 for the United States Revenue Marine. The lead ship in her class, she was built in New York by Thomas Stack for the sum of $103,000, and launched on 7 July 1863.

Pawtuxet was 130 feet (40 m) long, with a beam of 26 feet 6 inches (8.08 m) and both draft and hold depth of 11 feet (3.4 m). Like the other ships of her class, her contract called for a hull of oak, locust and white oak, strengthened with diagonal iron bracing. Her two-cylinder oscillating engine, built by New York's Novelty Iron Works, drove a single 8-foot (2.4 m) diameter screw propeller. Pawtuxet's speed is unrecorded but was probably similar to the 12 knots achieved by her sister ship USRC Kankakee. She was topsail schooner-rigged for auxiliary sail power.

Pawtuxet's armament consisted of a single 30-pounder Parrott rifle pivot gun, and five 24-pounder howitzers, one mounted in a pivot aft. She was crewed by a complement of seven officers and 34 enlisted men.

== Service history ==
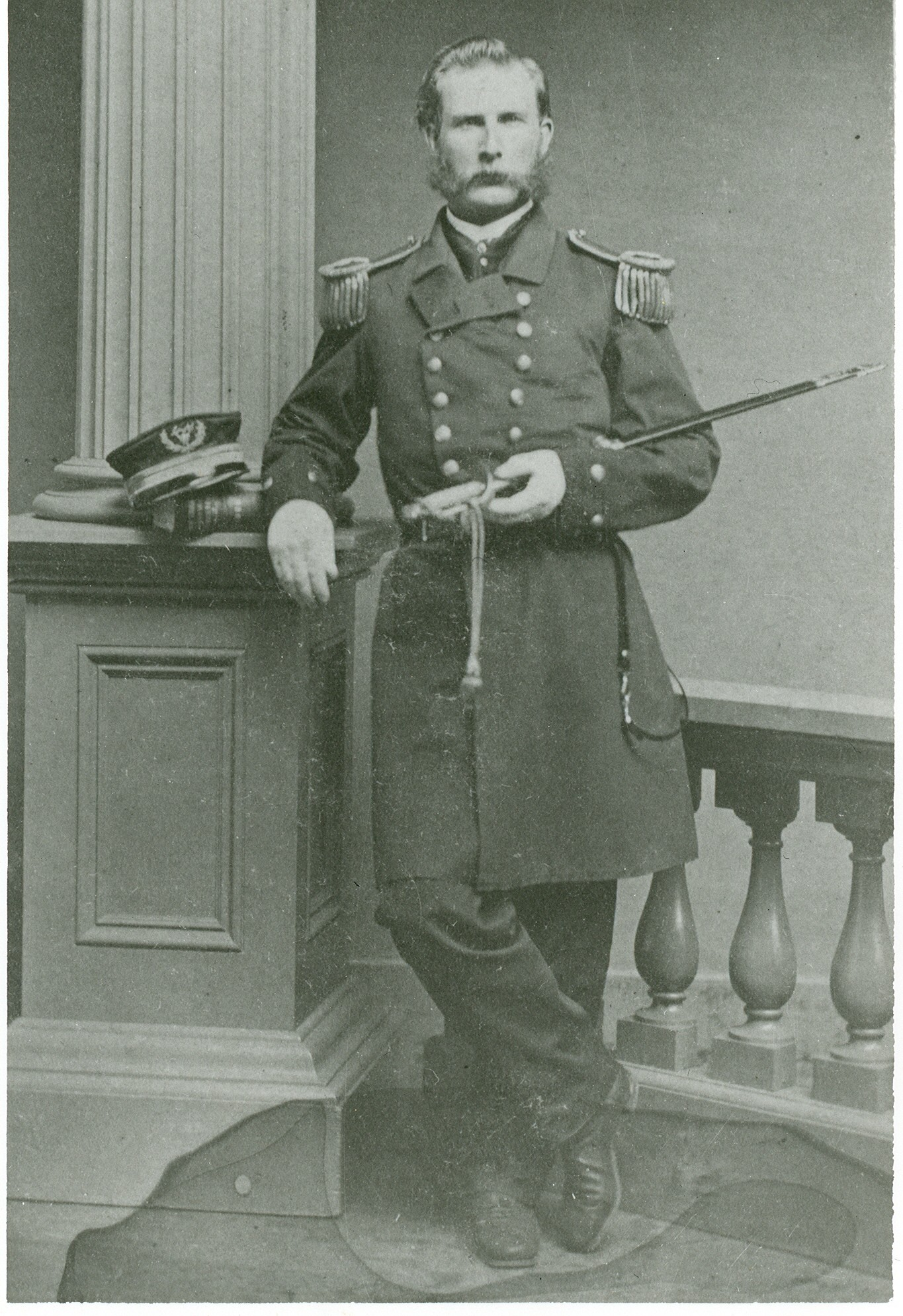
Captain Alvan A. Fengar, first commander of Pawtuxet

Soon after completion, Pawtuxet was despatched to Boston, Massachusetts, arriving 29 September 1864, the same day as her sister ship USRC Mahoning, against whom it was reported she would be tested in trials. Almost a year later, on 18 September 1865, Pawtuxet ran into the schooner Neptune's Bride, which was at anchor below Boston. The collision turned the schooner on her beam ends, but with a cargo of cotton, the vessel did not sink and was prepared for towing to the city.

In May 1866, the American Medical Association held its 16th Annual Convention in Boston. On the 8th, the Association organized a harbor excursion for its members on the steamers Rose Standish and Russia, which was attended by the Mayor, the Chief of Police, and other Boston dignitaries. As the steamers passed down the harbor, Pawtuxet fired a salute and hoisted its flag, to which the steamers responded by blowing their whistles, while passengers and spectators alike "lustily cheered" the spectacle.

By October, Pawtuxet appears to have been homeported at Newport, Rhode Island. Pawtuxet at this time was engaged in assisting the Western Union Telegraph Company lay a submarine cable between Holmes Hole, Martha's Vineyard, and the mainland at Wood's Hole, Falmouth. A few months later, in January 1867, Pawtuxet towed to safety the schooner Convoy, which had lost her sails off Cape Cod.

Around this time, the Revenue Marine decided to rid itself of a number of its Pawtuxet-class cutters, on the basis that their engines were too complicated. Accordingly, Pawtuxet was laid up on 31 May 1867 and "dismantled". On 7 August, Pawtuxet was sold at Boston to P. L. Everett for $25,600, who planned to dispatch the vessel for merchant service to China. She subsequently disappears from shipping registers.
