= Schmieder Bank =

Rocky bank west of Point Sur, California, south of Monterey

Coordinates: 36.2973°N 121.9500°W

Schmieder Bank is a rocky undersea bank west of Point Sur, California, roughly 25 nautical miles (46 km) south of Monterey, supporting an extraordinarily lush biological community, including very large individual colonies of the California hydrocoral, Stylaster californicus.

The bank lies about 3 nautical miles (6 km) west-southwest offshore from Point Sur. Within the 75-meter contour, the bank is roughly elliptical, with its major axis running northwest–southeast, enclosing an area of about 1 square mile (3 km^{2}). The surface of the bank is a surf-erosional plateau, punctuated by a series of narrow ridges (running approximately parallel to the major axis), and several extremely sharp isolated pinnacles. Minimum depths are 36 metres (118 ft) at one location and 40 metres (131 ft) at four or more other locations. During significant ice ages the bank emerged as an offshore island.

The bank was first explored during 1988–1991 by divers in visits organized and led by Dr. Robert Schmieder of Cordell Expeditions. That work generated a general description of the bank that was summarized in a privately published report. Because of the exceptionally rich biological community, the boundary of the Monterey Bay National Marine Sanctuary was extended to include the Point Sur area. The bank is similar in many respects to Cordell Bank, lying 121 nautical miles (224 km) to the northwest. The bank has become a desirable, but difficult, goal for scuba divers. Schmieder has characterized both this bank and Cordell Bank as examples of "underwater islands".

During 1986, NOAA carried out a high-resolution multibeam survey of the area as part of the Exclusive Economic Zone program. In 1998, the Monterey Bay Aquarium Research Institute was contracted to carry out a high-resolution (5-meter horizontal) survey of the area.

Schmieder Bank was named on October 15, 1990 by the United States Board on Geographic Names.

== Sources ==
- Guimarães, Marcos Perreau (January 16, 2005). "Sur Platform Exploration". Archived from the original on February 10, 2005.
- Lee, Robert (August 2009). "BAUE's August 2009 Trip to Schmieder Bank". Global Underwater Explorers.
- Lockwood, Millington; McGregor, Bonnie A., eds. (1989), Proceedings of the 1989 Exclusive Economic Zone Symposium on Mapping and Research: Federal-State Partners in EEZ Mapping (PDF), USGS
- Patterson, Jim. "California hydrocoral covered reef off Point Sur in Bug Sur".
- Navigational Chart 18686, NOAA, 1983
- EEZ Bathymetric Survey, Project No. OPR-M539-DA-86, Description Report, Field No. DA-20-3-86, Register B-94., NOAA, 1986
- "Monterey Bay National Marine Sanctuary".
- Schmieder, Robert W. (1989). The 1988 Expeditions to Pt. Sur. Summary of Results. Cordell Expeditions.
- Schmieder, Robert W. (1991). Ecology of an Underwater Island. Walnut Creek, CA: Cordell Expeditions.
- "Schmieder Bank, Undersea Features". geographic.org. November 16, 1993.
