= USRC Levi Woodbury =

Pawtuxet-class screw steam revenue cutter

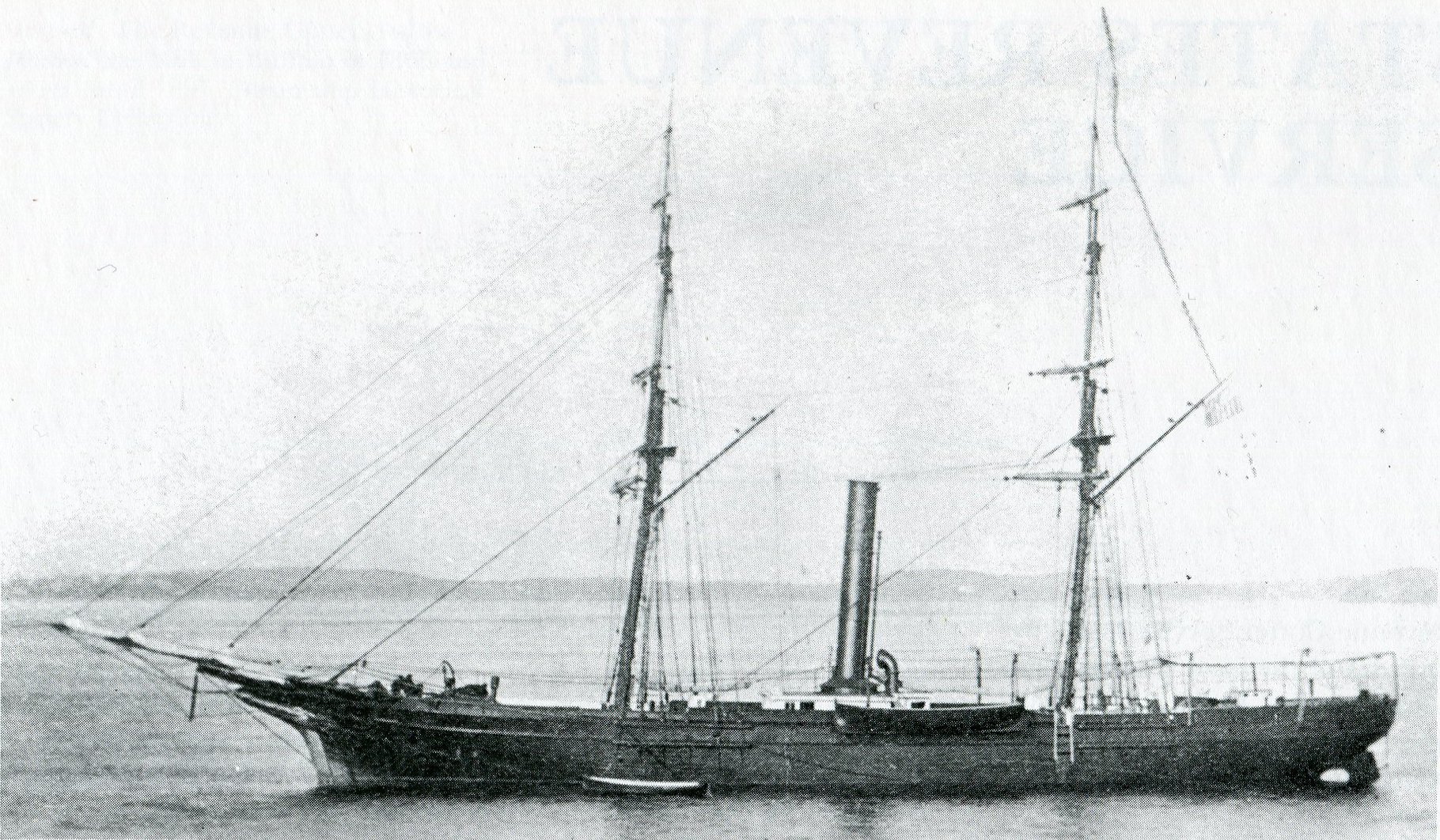
- USRC Levi Woodbury

History
- Name: USRC Levi Woodbury
- Namesake: Associate Justice Levi Woodbury
- Operator: United States Revenue Cutter Service; United States Coast Guard
- Builder: J. W. Lynn (Philadelphia, Pennsylvania)
- Launched: 29 Jul 1863
- Christened: Mahoning
- Commissioned: 18 Jul 1864–18 Jul 1915
- Renamed: USRC Levi Woodbury, 5 Jun 73; USS Woodbury, 1898; USRC Levi Woodbury, 1898; Laksco
- Home port: Portland, Maine; Eastport, Maine
- Fate: Unknown; dropped from shipping registers, 1932

General characteristics
- Class & type: Pawtuxet-class cutter
- Displacement: 350 tons
- Length: 130 ft (40 m)
- Beam: 26 ft 6 in (8.08 m)
- Draft: 11 ft (3.4 m)
- Depth of hold: 11 ft (3.4 m)
- Propulsion: 1 × two-cylinder oscillating steam engine; single 8 ft (2.4 m) screw
- Sail plan: Topsail schooner
- Speed: About 12 knots
- Complement: 7 officers, 34 enlisted
- Armament: Civil War: 1 × 30-pound Parrott rifle; 5 × 24-pound howitzers; 1912: 1 × rapid-fire 3-pounder

USRC Levi Woodbury was a Pawtuxet-class screw steam revenue cutter built for the United States Revenue Cutter Service during the American Civil War. Built in 1863–64, she became one of the longest-serving revenue cutters in the Service's history, and was the oldest active-duty ship in U.S. government service by the end of her 51-year career.

Originally named Mahoning, the ship spent almost her entire career operating off the coasts of Maine and Massachusetts, where through the course of several decades she accumulated an outstanding record for aiding ships in distress. Other highlights of her career included the foiling of a filibuster raid on Cuba in 1869, and participation in the funeral pageant of renowned philanthropist George Peabody. She also briefly served as USS Woodbury in the Spanish–American War.

After her final decommission in 1915, Levi Woodbury was placed into service as the merchant Laksco. She disappears from shipping records in 1932.

== Construction and design ==
Levi Woodbury—originally named Mahoning after a creek and a valley in Pennsylvania—was one of six Pawtuxet-class screw schooners ordered by the Treasury Department in 1863 for the United States Revenue Marine. Mahoning was built in Philadelphia by J. W. Lynn. Among those aboard for the launch, on the afternoon of Wednesday, 29 July 1863, were "a number of ladies, many officers of the Philadelphia Navy Yard, and other invited guests." Mahoning was christened by Miss Rebecca B. Thomas, daughter of Philadelphia's Collector of Ports, Colonel W. B. Thomas.

Mahoning was 130 feet (40 m) long, with a beam of 26 feet 6 inches (8.08 m) and both draft and hold depth of 11 feet (3.4 m). Like the other ships of her class, her contract called for a hull of oak, locust and white oak, strengthened with diagonal iron bracing. Her two-cylinder oscillating engine drove a single 8-foot (2.4 m) diameter screw propeller. Mahoning's speed is unrecorded but was probably similar to the 12 knots achieved by her sister ship USRC Kankakee. She was topsail schooner-rigged for auxiliary sail power.

Mahoning's armament consisted of a single 30-pounder Parrott rifle and five 24-pounder howitzers. She was crewed by a complement of seven officers and 34 enlisted men.

== Service history ==
=== Civil War service, 1864–65 ===
Mahoning was commissioned into the Revenue Marine on 18 July 1864. Among her first duties was the transport of a Congressional Committee in mid-August to Wiscasset, Fort Popham and Bath, Maine. On 29 September, Mahoning arrived in Boston, Massachusetts from Portland, Maine, on the same day as her sister ship Pawtuxet from New York City, and a comparative trial between the two vessels announced.

On 16 November, while attempting to enter the port of Castine, Maine during a gale, Mahoning was mistakenly fired upon by Battery White, which apparently mistook her for a Confederate privateer. Mahoning's Captain Webster reported that the Battery fired three rounds in total, at a range of 2.5 miles (4.0 km): "one blank cartridge and two excellent line shots [that] fell short". This reception persuaded the vessel to make for Seal Harbor instead.

=== Awards, 1866–67 ===
A year later, at Portland in November 1866, the British Government presented Captain Webster, commander of Mahoning, with "a fine gold chronometer and chain, in token of his services to British seamen in distress during last Winter." In May 1867, the United States Congress passed a resolution authorizing Captain Webster to receive a gold medal from Sir Frederick Bruck for aiding British vessels in distress.

=== Foiled filibuster raid, 1869 ===
In July 1869, Mahoning participated in the foiling of a planned filibuster raid on Cuba by "a motley collection of ex-officers and fanatics" known as the Cuban Liberators, who had gathered on Gardiners Island, New York, in preparation for their attack. Mahoning, still under the command of Captain Webster, initially approached the island with a force of 12 marines, but it was quickly realized this force was inadequate, and an additional party of 38 marines sent for, which arrived aboard the tugboat Rocket. After locating the filibusters' camp and firing a few warning shots, the marines were able to capture most of them without incident. The captives, in a "dirty and disorganized condition" and numbering 125 in total, were then transported aboard the revenue cutter to Fort Lafayette, where they were held pending further orders from Washington.

=== Peabody funeral pageant and other events, 1870–73 ===
On Saturday 29 January 1870, Mahoning participated in ceremonies occasioned by the return from the United Kingdom of the remains of noted philanthropist George Peabody at Portland Harbor, Maine. The ceremonies began at 10:15 am when Mahoning conveyed members of the U.S. Legislature to HMS Monarch, where they conducted an inspection of the ship and viewed Peabody's casket. The legislators then returned to Mahoning to be given a sightseeing tour of the assembled fleet from Mahoning's deck. Mahoning later joined the fleet as it formed a procession to escort Peabody's casket to shore.

Mahoning participated in a second ceremonial passage on Tuesday, 5 August 1872, when she escorted out of the harbor a Japanese diplomatic mission departing Boston on the Olympus. On 5 June 1873, Mahoning was renamed Levi Woodbury in honor of the Supreme Court Justice of the same name.

=== Cable ship welcome, 1874 ===
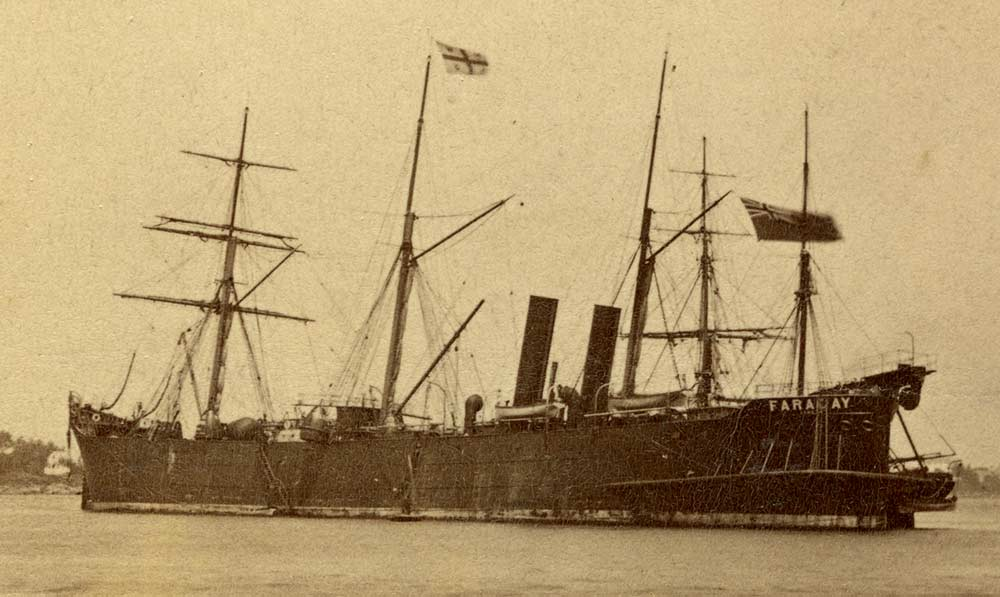
The cable ship Faraday. Levi Woodbury welcomed the vessel to the United States in 1874

In early June 1874, Levi Woodbury was despatched from Boston to try to locate the SS Faraday, a cable-laying ship from Britain whose appearance at Boston was behind schedule. Levi Woodbury departed Boston with a large party of about 150, including the mayor, several ex-mayors and other dignitaries. Thick fog however frustrated the expedition, and Levi Woodbury was obliged to return in the afternoon.

On 8 June Faraday was finally located off White Island, where she had anchored due to thick fog, and Levi Woodbury despatched to greet the vessel. The party from Levi Woodbury were warmly greeted aboard Faraday and treated to a "sumptuous lunch", after which various toasts were made celebrating the prospect of a new cable link between the two countries. A formal reception at Portland was organized the following day for Faraday's officers and electricians, to which the officers of Levi Woodbury were also invited.

In December, Levi Woodbury was transferred to Eastport, Maine, to take the place of revenue cutter Mosswood, which had been ordered to New York.

=== Winter patrols, 1870s–1890s ===
Over her many years of operation from New England ports, Levi Woodbury was regularly selected for the arduous duty of winter patrolling. The purpose of these patrols, which were carried out from 1 December to 1 April each year, was to cruise off "dangerous points" of the coastline in search of ships in distress and render them appropriate assistance:

Many a poor mariner, with his sails blown away, ground tackle gone, leaking badly, heavily iced up, food lockers empty, or perhaps out of his reckoning, sights the revenue cutter in the distance bearing down upon him, and experiences feelings which a landsman cannot understand.

These patrols, authorized directly by the U.S. President, were made "as close to the land as the safety of the vessel will permit", and were as extended as possible, weather, supplies and emergencies allowing.

Preparation for the patrols began in November, with all the ship's equipment, including masts, sails, rigging, boats, tackle, steering gear, pumps etc. being carefully inspected and repaired or renewed where necessary. New towing hawsers and heaving lines would also be procured. The ship would additionally be fitted over the cutwater with an iron, V-shaped icebreaker 3/8 of an inch thick and extending 18 inches above and below the waterline, secured by a number of heavy chains. Officers would discard their normal uniforms in preference for reefer jackets, fur cap and gloves.

The extent of Levi Woodbury's contribution to maritime safety over this period can be gauged by the fact that she was one of only two cutters assigned to patrol the Maine coastline, and that these waters, with their "immense number of shoals, rocks, reefs and islands", combined with the "very strong tides, high winds, fog, vapor and ice" typically accounted for about four fifths of the total number of ships aided by the Revenue Cutter Service each year. For example, in 1888, of the 526 ships in distress aided by the Service during the year, 400 were assisted by the two Maine cutters. Levi Woodbury had already accumulated a "remarkable" record of assistance by 1883; by 1892, it was being said of her that she had "battled with more ice"—and by extension, assisted more ships in distress—than any other steamer on the Eastern seaboard.

=== Spanish–American War, 1898 ===
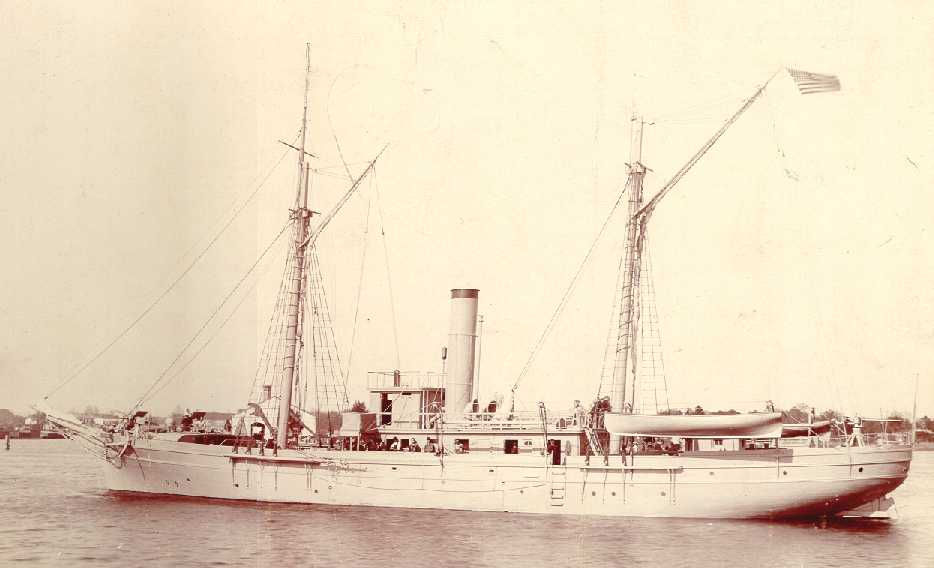
Woodbury at the Norfolk Navy Yard, shortly before her deployment to Havana during the Spanish–American War

With the Spanish–American War on the horizon, Levi Woodbury was ordered to join the U.S. Navy's North Atlantic Fleet on 24 March. Two days later, she received orders to report to Norfolk, Virginia, arriving there 2 April. She subsequently participated in operations with the North Atlantic Fleet from 8 May to the end of hostilities in August, during which time she was referred to simply as Woodbury in naval records.

Though Woodbury may have participated in troop convoys to Cuba, her primary duty in this period consisted of blockading the port of Havana. She took no prizes during her brief naval career and appears to have been involved in no engagements. Control of the cutter was returned to the Treasury Department on 17 August 1898. She seems to have retained the name Woodbury in Revenue Service records following the transfer.

=== Later service ===
After the war, Woodbury returned to her former base at Portland, Maine, on 16 November to resume patrols of the New England coast. That routine occupied her for the next 17 years. On 18 July 1904 she was involved in a minor collision with SS Sebascodegan in the harbor at Portland, Maine due to excessive speed in dense fog by the cutter resulting in US$1,200 in damage to the steamer. By 1912, her armament had been upgraded to a single rapid-fire 3-pounder. She also carried a 250 watt radio.

By 1913, Woodbury was not only the Coast Guard's oldest cutter, she was the oldest active-duty vessel in U.S. government service, as well as being the only ship to have seen active service in both the American Civil War and the Spanish–American War. Despite her age, she was still able to perform useful service. On 10 January 1913, for example, the crew of Woodbury were able to effect temporary repairs to their ship's broken rudder to go to the aid of the steamer Monhegan, which, after breaking down on the Maine coast, was being driven to destruction by a gale. Woodbury was able to get a line to the stricken vessel and tow it to safety, albeit at the stately pace of 3 knots.

In spite of such admirable efforts, however, Woodbury was clearly an obsolete ship, and in barely serviceable condition due to rotting timbers and worn out boilers. In 1913, the Revenue Cutter Service succeeded in its request to Congress for a replacement vessel, which was slated to enter service in 1915.

Woodbury achieved one of her last triumphs when on 7 August 1914, "in one of the most important ... [rescue] incidents of the year", she towed to safety the steamer Bay State, which, with 250 passengers and a crew of 104, had run aground "in a very exposed position" at Portland Head. A little under a year later, on 19 July 1915, Woodbury was placed out of commission, a few months after the creation of the United States Coast Guard, and a few days before the commission of her $225,000 replacement Ossipee. Woodbury's decommission ended a remarkable 51 years with the Revenue Cutter Service, making her one of the longest serving cutters in the organization's history.

Levi Woodbury was sold on 10 August to Thomas Butler & Co., of Boston, Massachusetts, and later entered service as the merchant Laksco. She disappears from shipping records in 1932.

== See also ==
Media related to USRC Mahoning/Levi Woodbury at Wikimedia Commons

== Bibliography ==
- U.S. Coast Guard Historian's Office. "Mahoning 1863".
- Silverstone, Paul H. (1989): Warships of the Civil War Navies, p. 188, Naval Institute Press, Annapolis, Maryland, ISBN 0-87021-783-6.
- United States Government (1913): Annual Report of the United States Revenue-Cutter Service for the Fiscal Year ended June 30, 1912, p. 70, Government Printing Office, Washington, D.C.
- United States Government (1913): Annual Report of the United States Revenue-Cutter Service for the Fiscal Year ended June 30, 1913, pp. 42, 62, 80; Government Printing Office, Washington, D.C.
- United States Government (1915): Annual Report of the United States Revenue-Cutter Service for the Fiscal Year ended June 30, 1915, pp. 7, 34; Government Printing Office, Washington, D.C.
