= Japanese steam warship Takao =

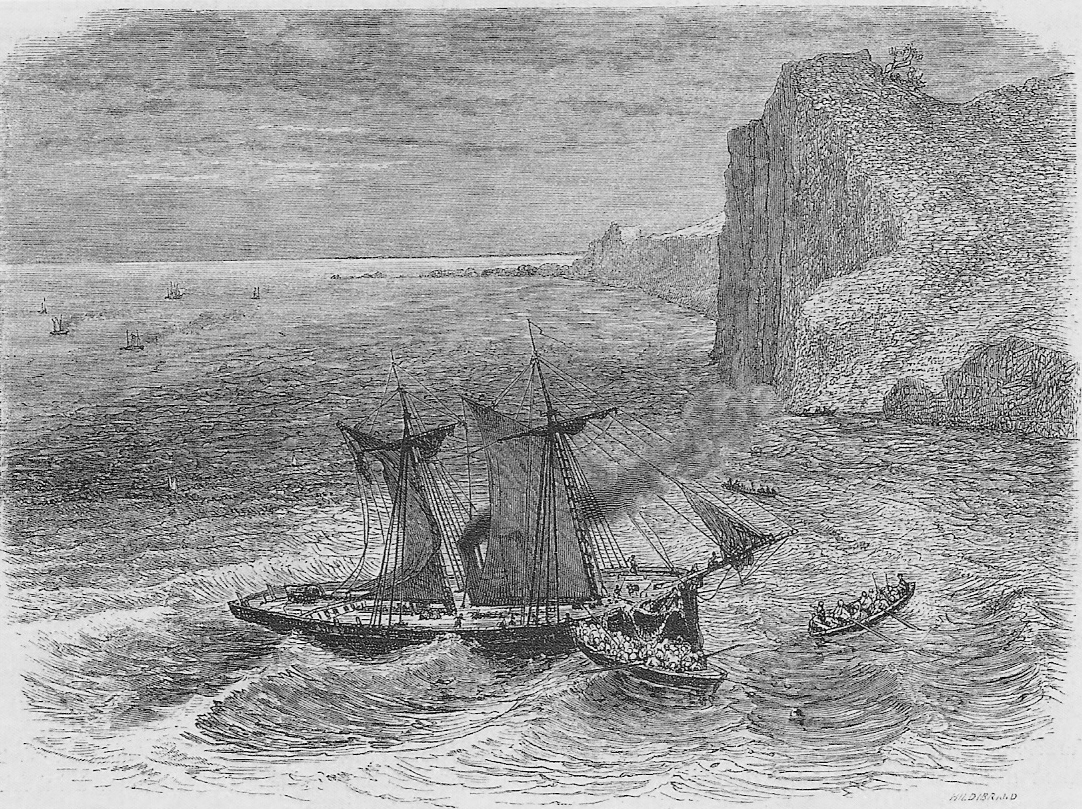
- The Takao, pursued by steamships of the Imperial Navy

History

Republic of Ezo
- Name: Takao Maru, Kaiten No.2
- Builder: John Englis, New York City
- Launched: 8 July 1863
- Acquired: 1867
- Fate: Destroyed, 25 March 1869

General characteristics
- Class & type: Pawtuxet-class cutter
- Displacement: 350 long tons (356 t)
- Length: 130 ft (40 m)
- Beam: 26 ft 6 in (8.08 m)
- Draft: 11 ft (3.4 m)
- Propulsion: 1 × two-cylinder oscillating steam engine; single 8 ft (2.4 m) screw
- Speed: 12 knots (22 km/h; 14 mph)
- Armament: 4 × smoothbore cannon; 1 × Armstrong cannon

Takao Maru (高雄丸), later renamed Kaiten No.2 (第二回天, Daini Kaiten), was a steam warship of the former navy of the Tokugawa shogunate during the Boshin War of 1868-1869.

She was originally built in New York as USRC Ashuelot, a Pawtuxet-class screw steam revenue cutter built for the United States Revenue Marine during the American Civil War. She was later purchased by as a private warship by Akita Domain, one of the feudal domains of the Tokugawa shogunate of Japan, and named Takao Maru. Following the collapse of the Tokugawa Shogunate, she was transferred to the Republic of Ezo (蝦夷共和国, Ezo Kyōwakoku), a short-lived state established by Tokugawa loyalists, and renamed Kaiten No.2. She was armed with four smoothbore cannon on the side, and a powerful Armstrong cannon with explosive shells, installed on a rotating base.

She participated in the Battle of Miyako Bay, when three Tokugawa Navy warships were dispatched for a surprise attack against Imperial forces. For the battle, Eugene Collache, a French navy officer, was put in command of the Kaiten No.2, on which were sailing 40 seamen and 30 samurai. The two other ships were the Kaiten No.1 (Kaiten Maru) and the Banryū.

The ships encountered bad weather, in which the Kaiten No.2 suffered engine trouble, and the Banryu was separated. The Banryu eventually returned to Hokkaido, without joining the battle. To create surprise, the Kaiten No.1 planned to enter Miyako harbour under an American flag as a ruse de guerre. Unable to achieve more than 3 knots due to engine trouble, the Kaiten No.2 trailed behind, and the Kaiten No.1 first joined battle. The Kaiten No.1 approached the enemy ships and raised the Tokugawa banner seconds before boarding the French-built Kōtetsu, of the opposing Imperial navy (the first Japanese ironclad). The Kōtetsu managed to repel the attack with a Gatling gun, with huge loss on the attacking side. The Kaiten No.1, pursued by the Imperial fleet, steamed out of Miyako Bay just as the Kaiten No.2 was entering it. The Kaiten No.1 eventually escaped to Hokkaido, but the Kaiten No.2 was unable to escape. She was set on fire by her escaping crew and exploded.

Collache was imprisoned by the Japanese, judged and condemned to death, but he was finally pardoned. At the end of the conflict, he was sent to Tokyo, where he rejoined Jules Brunet, and later left for France.
