= Pawtuxet-class cutter =

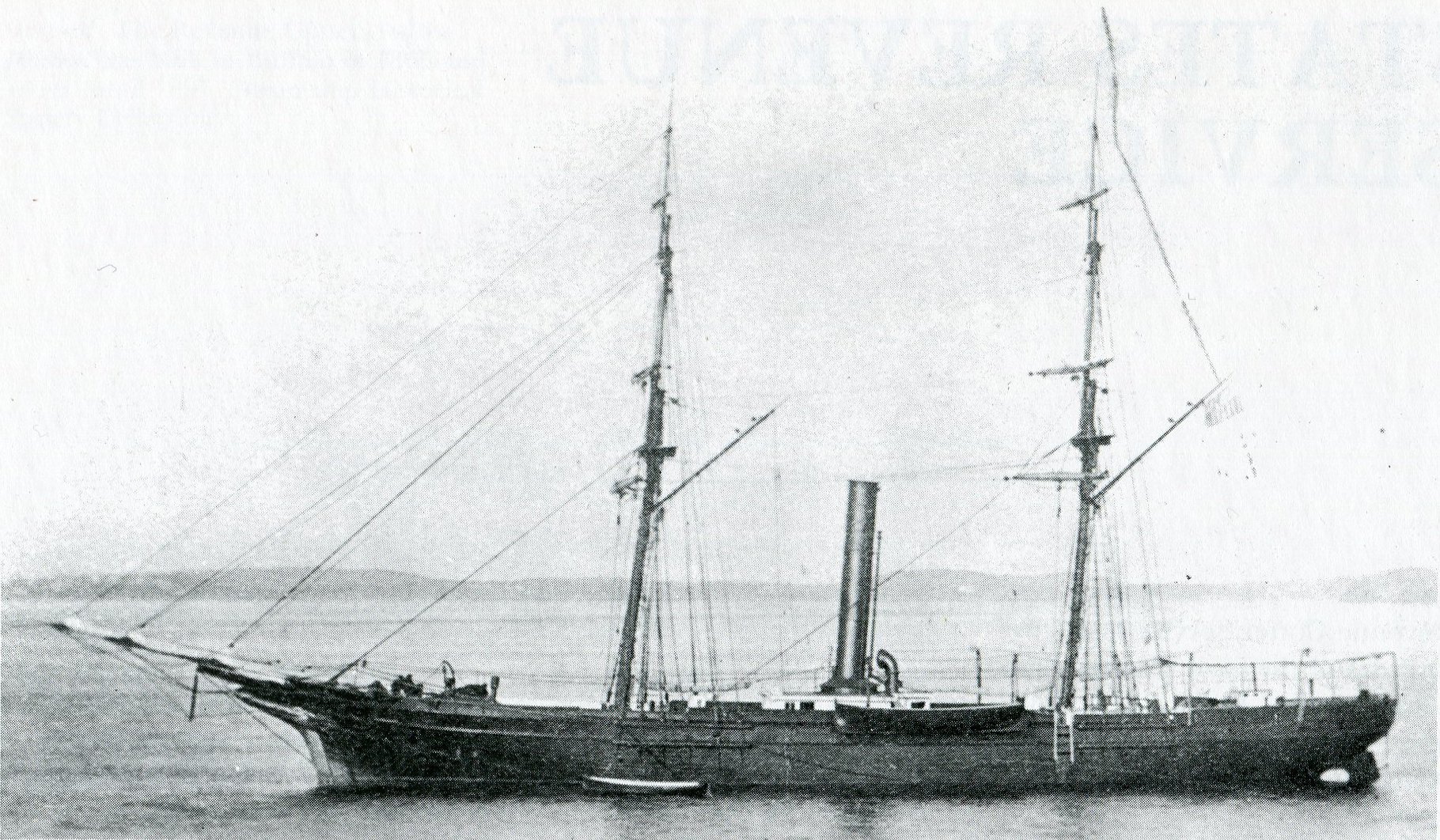
- USRC Levi Woodbury, the longest-serving ship of the Pawtuxet class

Class overview
- Name: Pawtuxet-class cutter
- Builders: John Englis—New York, NY; Thomas Stack—Williamsburg, NY; Westervelt & Son—New York, NY; J. T. Fardy & Co—Baltimore, MD; J. A. Robb & Co—Baltimore, MD; J. W. Lynn—Philadelphia, PA
- Operators: United States Revenue Cutter Service; United States Navy; United States Coast Guard; Various merchant
- Cost: $103,000 each
- In service: 1864–1932?
- In commission: 1864–1915
- Completed: 6
- Active: None

General characteristics
- Displacement: 350 tons
- Length: 130 ft (40 m)
- Beam: 26 ft 6 in (8.08 m)
- Draft: 5 ft 4 in (1.63 m) (aft)
- Depth of hold: 11 ft (3.4 m)
- Propulsion: 1 × two-cylinder oscillating steam engine; single 8 ft (2.4 m) screw
- Sail plan: Topsail schooner
- Speed: About 12 knots
- Complement: USRM: 7 × officers, 34 enlisted
- Armament: 1 × 30-pound Parrott rifle; 5 × 24-pound howitzers

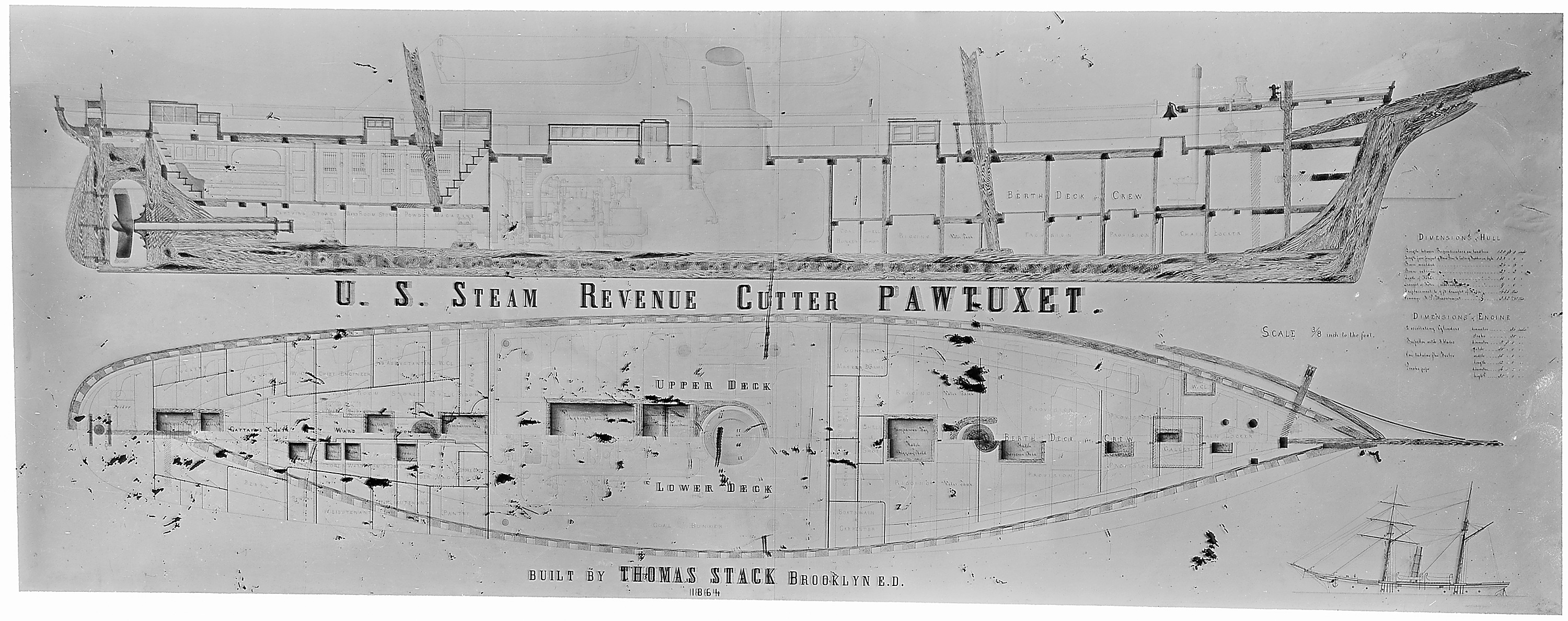
Thomas Stack plans

The Pawtuxet-class cutters were a class of six screw steam revenue cutters built for the United States Revenue Cutter Service during the American Civil War.

The cutters served mostly on patrol and convoy escort duty during the war. In the postwar period, some were used as transports for government officials in addition to their normal duties. Two of them played a role in the foiling of filibuster raids on Canada and Cuba in the late 1860s.

In 1867, four of the cutters were disposed of after only some 2½ years of service, on the grounds that their engines were overcomplicated. These four vessels—Ashuelot, Pawtuxet, Kankakee and Kewanee—went into merchant service in Asia and either had short careers or disappeared from shipping registers.

Of the remaining two cutters, Wayanda went to the West Coast, where she conducted an important survey of the Alaskan coastline before being sold in 1873, when she became the merchant steamer Los Angeles. Los Angeles was wrecked off Point Sur in 1894. Mahoning, meanwhile, renamed Levi Woodbury, went on to a remarkable 51-year career with the Cutter Service, accumulating an outstanding record for aiding ships in distress from her homeports in Maine, and also serving in the Spanish–American War, before being sold in 1915.

== Development, design and construction ==
At the outbreak of the American Civil War in 1861, the United States Revenue Cutter Service was in a dilapidated state, with only one steamer in its entire fleet, and only 28 ships in total. The Pawtuxet class cutters were the first new steam-powered vessels to be ordered for the Service since the 1840s, and as such, represented a major element in the Service's wartime rejuvenation.

In common with the usual government practice during the war, construction contracts for the Pawtuxets were distributed through several states, with three of them built in New York, two in Baltimore, Maryland, and one in Philadelphia, Pennsylvania. For the New York-built ships, the engines for two of them, Ashuelot and Pawtuxet, were supplied by the Novelty Iron Works, while the engines for the third, Kankakee, were supplied by J. & R. I. Grey's Phoenix Iron Works. The engine builders for the other three ships are not known.

The Pawtuxet contracts called for hulls of oak, locust and white oak, strengthened with diagonal iron bracing. The ships were 130 feet (40 m) long, with a beam of 26 feet 6 inches (8.08 m) and both draft and hold depth of 11 feet (3.4 m).

Depending on the source, the vessels of the Pawtuxet class were each powered by either one double- or two single-cylinder oscillating engines; the distinction is probably semantic. The engine (or engines) operated a single 8-foot diameter screw propeller. The only available machinery specifications are for the cutter Kankakee, but specifications for the others were probably similar if not identical. The oscillating cylinders for Kankakee had a 36 inch bore, 30-inch stroke and 10-inch steam cut-off. Steam, at a pressure of about 22 psi, was supplied by a single tubular boiler. The engine drove a single 8-foot diameter, 12-foot pitch screw propeller geared upward at a ratio of 3:1, delivering a speed of about 12 knots.

Most if not all ships in the class were topsail schooner rigged for auxiliary sail power, although Kankakee may have been brig rigged. Armament for each of the ships consisted of one 30-pounder Parrott rifle and five 24-pound howitzers. In at least some of the ships, two of the guns were pivot mounted, one fore and one aft. The vessels each had a complement of 41—seven officers and 34 enlisted.

The six ships of the class were launched between July and September 1863, and completed about a year later, entering service between July and November 1864.

== Service history ==
=== Early service, 1864 to late 1860s ===
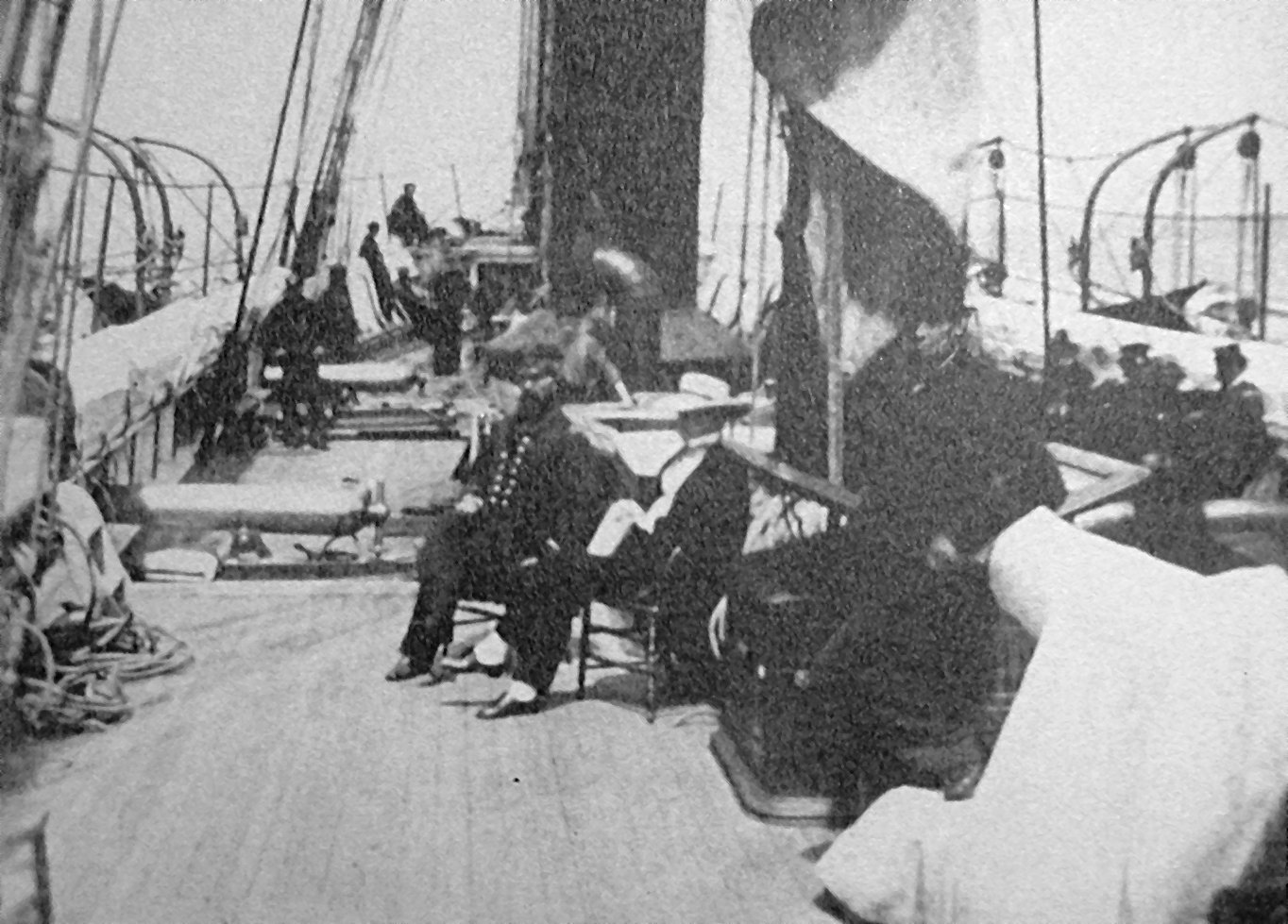
Deck of Wayanda, ca. 1864. The shadowy image of beneath the sail, center right, is Abraham Lincoln. In the original, Lincoln’s face Is blurred by movement. His face was unnecessarily added at a later date. Sources: 1) Photograph is found on the page between pages 230 and 231 in Frederick W. Seward’s 1891 biography of his father entitled, “Seward at Washington as Senator and Secretary of State: A Memoir of His Life ...”. 2) Personal knowledge also contributes to the veracity of this comment. A copy of the photo was given to Captain J. W. White by Frank Pulsiver, Engineer in the USRC and the photographer and neighbor of Secretary Seward. It remains with one of the Captain’s descendants.

Commissioned in the closing months of the Civil War, few if any ships of the class had an opportunity for significant participation in the conflict. Kewanee and Wayanda are known to have done some convoy escort before the end of hostilities, while Kewanee also did some cruising for privateers. The only exchange of gunfire known to have involved any of the ships during the war occurred in November 1864, when a shore battery at Castine, Maine opened fire on Mahoning, but this was a case of mistaken identity.

In the postwar period, the class settled into the normal peacetime duties of the Revenue Cutter Service. These included the prevention of smuggling; enforcing neutrality, quarantine, and other customs and navigation laws; protecting ships, shipwrecks and U.S. timber reserves; and in the words of one contemporary source, "saving the imperilled, feeding the hungry, and guiding the lost". In the immediate postwar period, two ships of the class, Kankakee and Wayanda, were also engaged in extended transport missions, with Kankakee transporting customs agents to ports of the recently vanquished Confederacy to restore customs offices, and Wayanda placed at the disposal of Chief Justice Salmon P. Chase for a two-month factfinding mission to the South. On the basis of his tour, Chase later recommended the extension of suffrage to Southern blacks, but his recommendations were ignored by the Johnson administration.

In the late 1860s, two cutters of the class, Ashuelot and Mahoning, assisted in the thwarting of filibuster raids, the former in a planned 1866 raid on Canada by members of the Fenian Brotherhood, and the latter in a later planned invasion of Cuba by a group of "ex officers and fanatics" known as the "Cuban Liberators". In the same period, Wayanda and Kankakee were used for testing safety apparatus, mostly for the quick and effective launch of lifeboats.

By 1867, after barely 2½ years of service from the class, the Revenue Cutter Service decided to divest itself of most of the Pawtuxets as their engines were deemed too complicated. Four of the vessels, Ashuelot, Kankakee, Kewanee and Pawtuxet, were consequently laid up in May 1867, and sold between June and August of the same year. The first three of the above-named vessels all subsequently sailed to Japan, apparently in merchant service. Kewanee, renamed Musashi, became involved in the war between the Japanese Emperor Kōmei and the Tokugawa Shogunate, and exploded off Yokohama in 1869. Ashuelot, as Takao, was destroyed the same year, while Kankakee, renamed Kawachi, was broken up after 1868. Pawtuxet, meanwhile, was sent to China and her later service history unknown.

=== Later service, late 1860s to 1915 ===
The two remaining cutters of the class, Wayanda and Mahoning, retained as the best of the Pawtuxets, both went on to make significant contributions with the Revenue Service. Wayanda was lengthened by 40 feet and sent via Cape Horn to the West Coast, where in 1868 she conducted an important survey of the coast of the newly acquired U.S. territory of Alaska. The recommendation of her captain, John W. White, to establish a federal reserve in the Pribilof Islands to protect both the Northern fur seals and the native Aleut people, was quickly acted upon by the U.S. government. His report on the misuse of alcohol as payment to the Aleuts by fur trading companies may also have influenced the government's decision to ban the importation of alcohol into the territory. Wayanda was sold in 1873, renamed Los Angeles, and employed as a freight and passenger steamer on the West Coast for another 20 years, before being wrecked off Point Sur in 1894.

The last ship of the class to operate as a revenue cutter, Mahoning, later named Levi Woodbury, went on to an extraordinary 51-year career with the Revenue Service. Operating from various homeports in Maine, Levi Woodbury accumulated an outstanding record of aiding ships in distress in her regular winter patrols. She also served briefly as USS Woodbury during the Spanish–American War. After her final decommission in 1915, she too was sold into merchant service, disappearing from shipping registers in 1932.

== List of ships ==
This is a list of ships of the Pawtuxet class. The list is sorted by launch date; however the table includes sort buttons so the list can be sorted by any column.

Pawtuxet-class cutters
Name	Builder	Built	Engine	Launched	In service by^{[a]}	Sold	Notes
Pawtuxet	Thomas Stack	Williamsburg, NY	Novelty	1863/07/07	1864/09	1867/08/07	Sent to China; disappears from shipping registers
Ashuelot	John Englis	Brooklyn, NY	Novelty	1863/07/08	1864/11	1867/04/30	Renamed Takao, then Kaiten No.2. Destroyed in Japan, 1869
Levi Woodbury	J. W. Lynn	Philadelphia, PA	n/a	1863/07/29	1864/07/18	1915/07/18	Originally Mahoning; renamed Levi Woodbury, 1873. Disappears from shipping registers, 1932
Wayanda	J. T. Fardy & Co	Baltimore, MD	n/a	1863/08/31	1864/05	1873/10/18	Renamed Los Angeles after 1873. Wrecked off Point Sur, 1894
Kankakee	Westervelt & Son	New York, NY	Phoenix	1863/09/15	1864/09	1867/05/28	Renamed Kawachi; broken up after Feb 1869
Kewanee	J. A. Robb & Co	Baltimore, MD	n/a	1863/09/23	1864/08/15	1867/07/10	Renamed Musashi. Exploded off Yokohama, 1869

== Notes ==
- ^{a} The date on which the ship is first known to have been in service. These dates may not necessarily correspond with the date the ship actually entered service.

== Bibliography ==
- Chase, Salmon P.; Niven, John (1993): The Salmon P. Chase Papers: Journals, 1829–1872, pp. xliii-xliv, Kent State University Press, ISBN 978-0-87338-472-8.
- King, Irving H. (1996): The Coast Guard Expands 1865–1915: New Roles, New Frontiers, pp. 6, 23, 25-28, US Naval Institute Press, ISBN 978-1-55750-458-6.
- Silverstone, Paul H. (1989): Warships of the Civil War Navies, p. 188, Naval Institute Press, Maryland, ISBN 0-87021-783-6.
