= Point Sur State Historic Park =

State park in Monterey County, California

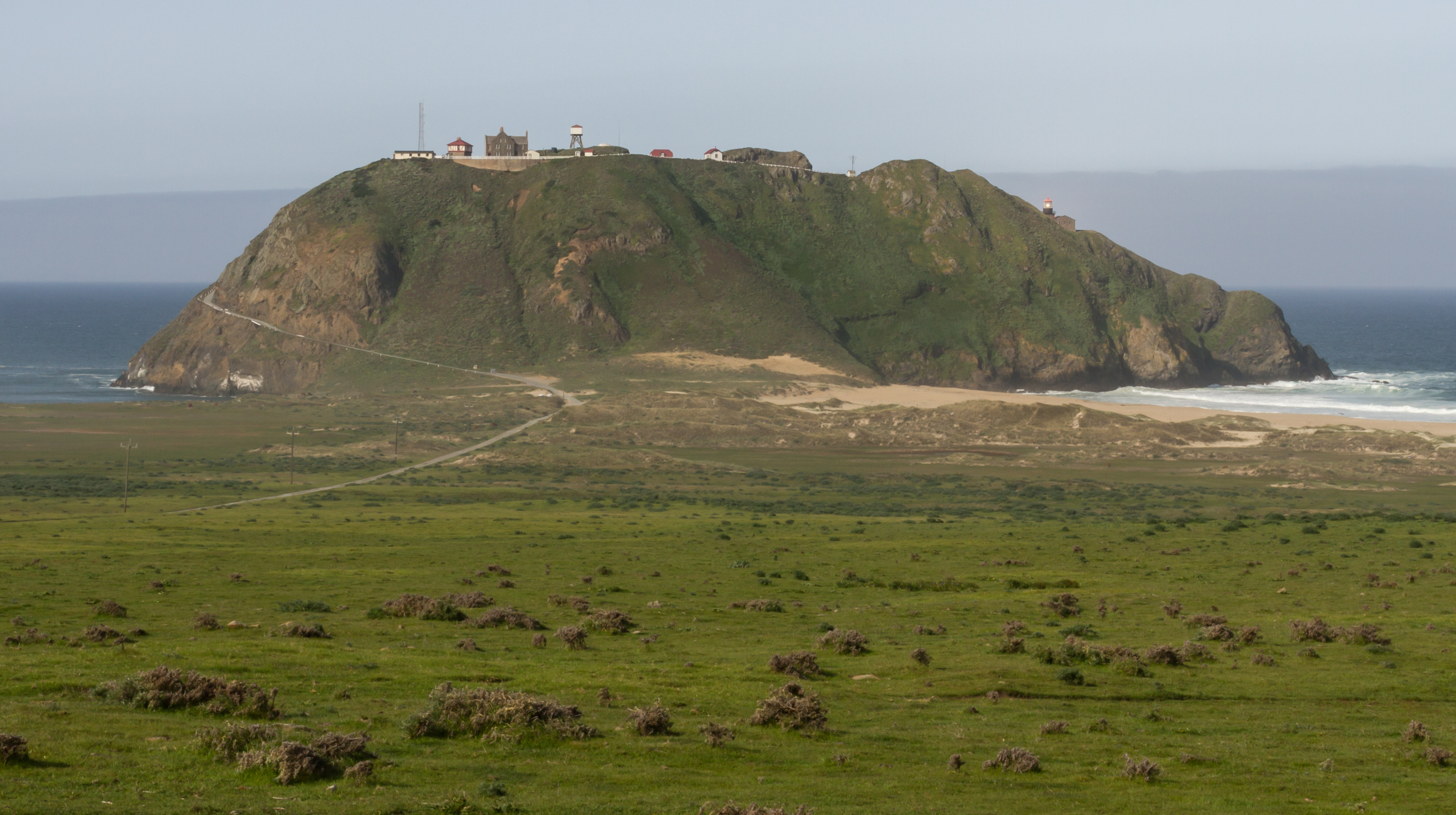
- Point Sur from California State Route 1

- Location within California Location within the United States
- Location: Monterey County, California, United States
- Nearest city: Carmel, California
- Coordinates: 36°18′23″N 121°54′6″W
- Area: 92 acres (37 ha)
- Established: 1986
- Governing body: California Department of Parks and Recreation

Point Sur State Historic Park is a California State Park on the Big Sur coastline of Monterey County, California, United States, 19 miles (31 km) south of Rio Road in Carmel. The 1889 Point Sur Lighthouse is on the National Register of Historic Places.

== History ==
The point was granted as a part of Rancho El Sur in 1834 by Governor José Figueroa to Juan Bautista Alvarado.

Point Sur was a notorious hazard to navigation. The 725-ton steamer USS Ventura was the fastest ship in Goodall, Nelson & Perkins’ fleet; she could do thirteen knots. On Tuesday, April 20, 1875, she set sail from San Francisco with 225 passengers and 500 tons of freight. In dense fog the ship ran onto rocks just north of Point Sur. The ship's commander, Captain George John Fake, was a veteran mariner. He had navigated the route between Monterey and San Francisco for several years. But this was his first trip from Monterey to Southern California. While he was drunk that night, the absence of a light contributed to the tragedy. The sinking of the Ventura became the impetus for building a lightstation in the remote area.

Other ships lost in the area include the 493 tons (447 t) S.S. Los Angeles (originally USRC Wayanda), which ran aground in 1894, the Majestic in 1909, the Shna-Yak in 1916, the Thomas L. Wand in 1922, the Babinda in 1923, the Rhine Maru, the Panama and the S. Catania in 1930, and the Howard Olson in 1956.

John Bautista Henry Cooper, who owned the portion of Rancho El Sur surrounding Point Sur, sold to the United States .5 acres (0.20 ha) of land on the rocky summit of Point Sur for $5 and the right-of-way for $1,495 (or about $54,000 today) as recorded on November 9, 1889.

In 1888, Joseph Post won a government contract to build the road from the coastal road his father W.B. Post had built to Point Sur, where the lighthouse would be built.

=== Lighthouse construction ===
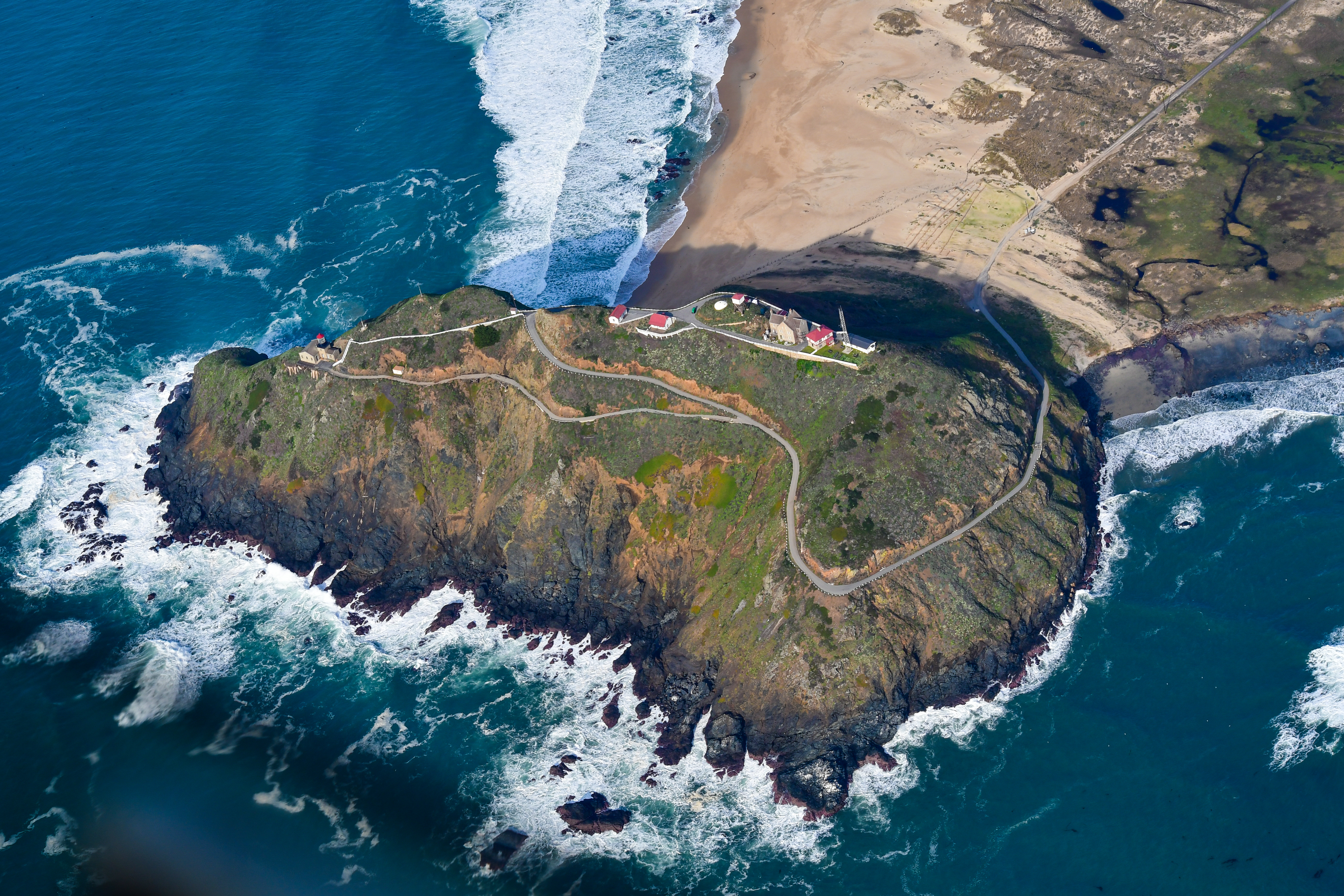
Aerial view of Point Sur Lighthouse.

Point Sur Lighthouse opened on August 1, 1889. The station was very remote and was necessarily self-sufficient, as most supplies had to be brought in by ship. Lighthouse employees and their families had their own vegetable gardens. Children stayed with local ranchers during the week to attend school, returning home on weekends, or stayed with distant relatives. In 1927, a schoolteacher was assigned to the lightstation to teach the six children who resided there. When the two-lane road from Monterey to the Big Sur Village was completed in 1927, children could attend school at a school house on Highway 1. In the 1940s, children from the lightstation were assimilated into Big Sur's larger school.

The coast off Point Sur Lighthouse was the location of the sinking of the United States Navy airship USS Macon (ZRS-5) in 1935. The Lighthouse Service was absorbed into the Coast Guard in 1939, and Point Sur Lighthouse became the property of the Coast Guard. The lightstation was automated in the late 1960s, and in 1974 ceased to have a light keeper. Point Sur State Historic Park was established in 1986.

=== Naval Facility Point Sur added ===
In 2000, the nearby Naval Facility Point Sur, except for one building retained by the U.S. Navy, was transferred to the California State Park system. It became part of the Point Sur State Historic Park. The state park used some of the facility's housing for a period. The facility is open for guided tours on weekends.

On February 3, 2017, the California Historical Resources Commission nominated Naval Facility Point Sur for the National Register of Historic Places. It was chosen in part because Point Sur NAVFAC is one of the last remaining Sound Surveillance System (SOSUS) facilities, and the only one remaining on the West Coast.

== Etymology ==
The land formation later known as Point Sur is visible at sea for 10 miles (16 km) and was first mentioned in the logs of Juan Rodríguez Cabrillo in 1552. Sebastian Viscaino visited the area in the early 1600s, and his 1603 map names the promontory "Punta que Parece Isla" (meaning "Point that looks like an island"). In 1769, explorer Miguel Costansó, a member of the Portolá expedition, named the point "Morro de la Trompa" because it looked like a rock in the shape of a trumpet.

The name "El Sur" (meaning "The South") was first applied to a land grant named Rancho El Sur given by Governor José Figueroa to Juan Bautista Alvarado on July 30, 1834. The name of the rock was shortened to Moro Rock, until the U.S. Coast Survey renamed it Point Sur in 1851.

== Marine Protected Areas ==
Point Sur State Marine Reserve and Marine Conservation Area are marine protected areas offshore from Point Sur Lighthouse. Like underwater parks, these marine protected areas help conserve ocean wildlife and marine ecosystems.

== See also ==
- List of beaches in California
- List of California state parks
