= USS Resaca (1865) =

U.S. Navy screw steamer

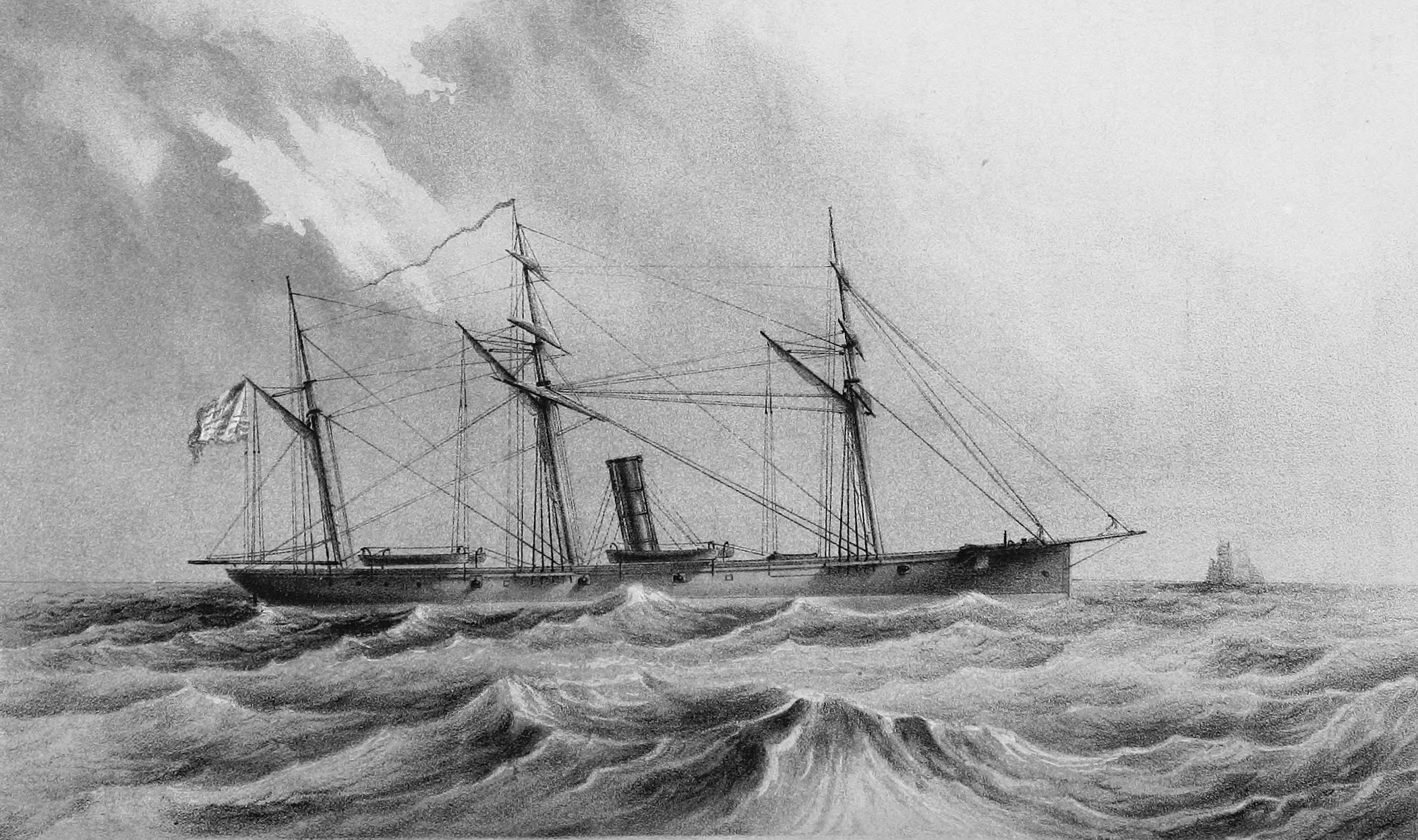
- Resaca (drawing by M. B. Woolsey, c. 1867)

History

United States
- Name: USS Resaca
- Builder: Portsmouth Navy Yard, Maine
- Cost: $201,229.19
- Launched: 18 November 1865
- Commissioned: 1866
- Decommissioned: 1872
- Fate: Sold, 18 February 1873

General characteristics
- Class & type: Third-class screw steamer
- Displacement: 1,129 long tons (1,147 t)
- Length: 216 ft (66 m) p/p
- Beam: 31 ft (9.4 m)
- Draft: 12 ft (3.7 m)
- Speed: 11 knots (20 km/h; 13 mph)
- Complement: 213
- Armament: 1 × 150-pounder rifle; 6 × 32-pounder guns; 2 × 24-pounder howitzers
- Notes: Total cost of naval repairs while in service was $110,048.70.

USS Resaca was a third-class screw steamer of the United States Navy. Built at Portsmouth Navy Yard, Maine at a cost of $201,229.19, the ship was launched on 18 November 1865, and commissioned in 1866, Comdr. J. M. Bradford in command.

== Service history ==
=== 1866–1869 ===
Assigned to the Pacific Station, Resaca was initially ordered to relieve the sloop Jamestown cruising off the Mexican and Central American coast in protection of U.S. citizens and property against threats of war and an uncertain political situation. An outbreak of yellow fever among the crew of Jamestown, however, spread to the Resaca and caused both ships to be sent to cruise in Alaskan waters—in effect a quarantine station. On the Resaca, of 77 affected crewmen, 19 died. Both ships arrived at Sitka in August 1867, and Resaca remained in northern latitudes off the new U.S. Alaska Territory until returning in 1869 to San Francisco.

=== 1869–1872 ===
Proceeding to Panama on 23 November 1869, Resaca continued south to Callao, Peru, before commencing a long Pacific cruise on 16 May. Sailing westward, she passed through the Marquesas, Society Friendly, and Fiji Islands before reaching New Zealand. On the return voyage she called at Tahiti on 15 June 1870 before arriving at Valparaiso, Chile, on 24 November. Soon afterward she proceeded to Callao for a refit and change of command before being detached from squadron duties in January 1871 to help survey the Isthmus of Darien. Returning to Panama on 4 June she departed for duty as a supply ship at Callao on 16 July, calling briefly at Guayaquil en route. In 1872 she returned north and was placed out of commission at Mare Island Navy Yard, California.

=== Sale and wreck ===
Resaca was sold on 18 February 1873 at Mare Island to Messrs. Christopher Nelson, Charles Goodall, and George C. Perkins, for $41,000. Rebuilt by Dickie Bros. at San Francisco for service as a steamer capable of carrying 145 passengers, Resaca was renamed Ventura. Subsequently, on 16 February 1875, she became the property of the Goodall, Nelson, and Perkins Steam Ship Co. engaged in coastwise California service. While serving in this capacity, Ventura was wrecked off Point Sur on 20 April 1875 and lost. Reports accused the captain of being drunk and the ship hit a cluster of rocks just north of Point Sur. Everyone aboard reached shore safely, leaving the ship to break up on the rocks and slowly sink.
