= Point Sur Lighthouse =

Lighthouse in California, United States

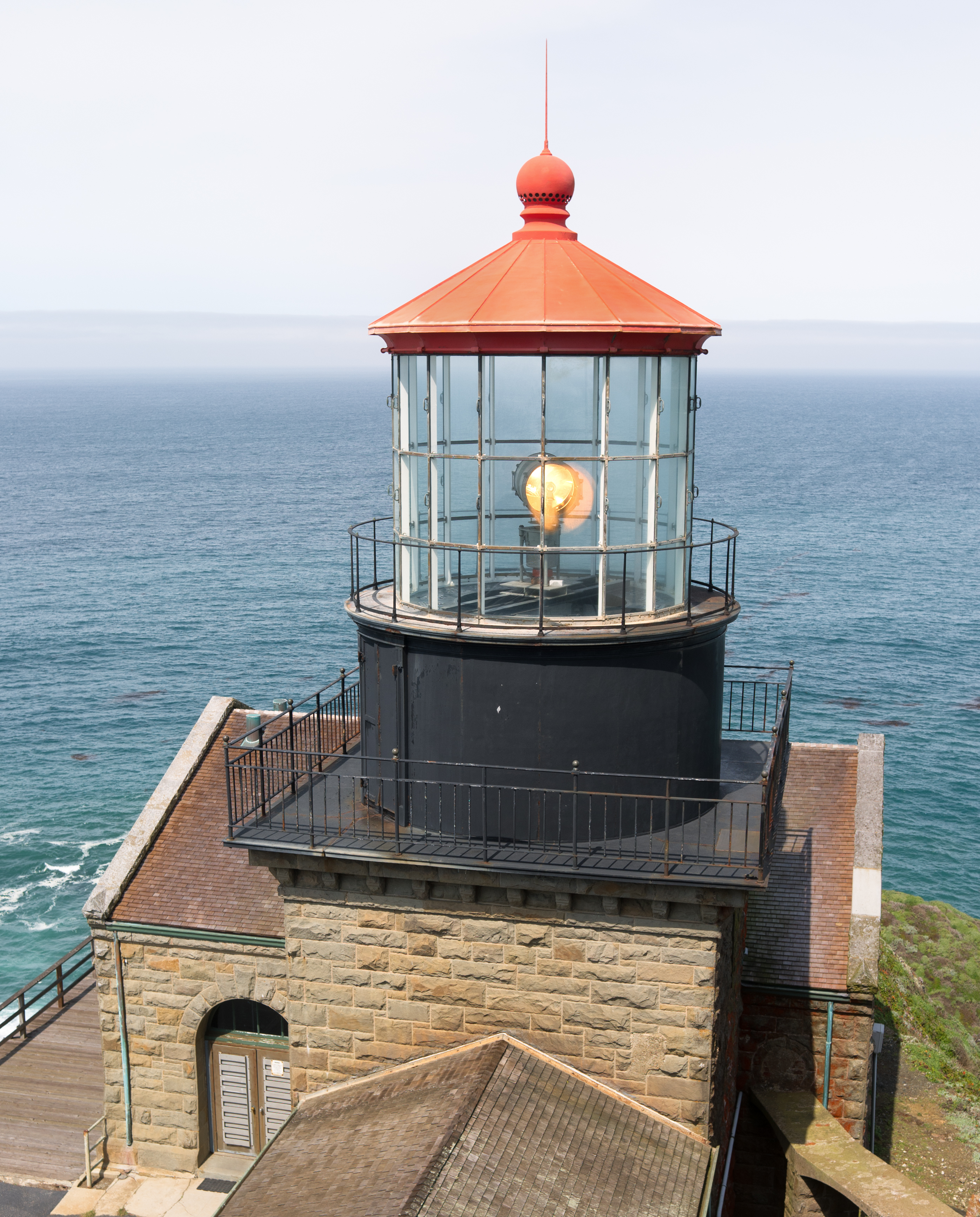
- Point Sur Light in 2013
- Location: Point Sur State Historic Park; California; United States
- Coordinates: 36°18′22.79″N 121°54′05.36″W

Tower
- Constructed: 1889
- Construction: sandstone tower
- Automated: 1972
- Height: 48 ft (15 m)
- Shape: square tower with balcony and lantern attached to fog signal building
- Markings: unpainted tower, black lantern
- Operator: Point Sur State Historic Park
- Heritage: National Register of Historic Places listed place
- Fog signal: 2 blasts every 60

Light
- Focal height: 270 ft (82 m)
- Lens: First order Fresnel lens (original), DCB-224 (current)
- Characteristic: Fl W 15s.
- Point Sur Light Station
- U.S. National Register of Historic Places
- U.S. Historic district
- California Historical Landmark
- Nearest city: Carmel, California
- Area: 37 acres (15 ha)
- Architectural style: Renaissance, Romanesque, Lighthouse
- MPS: Light Stations of California MPS
- NRHP reference No.: 91001097
- CHISL No.: 951
- Added to NRHP: September 3, 1991

Point Sur Lighthouse is a lightstation at Point Sur 24.6 miles (39.6 km) south of Monterey, California at the peak of the 361-foot (110 m) rock at the head of the point. It was established in 1889 and is part of Point Sur State Historic Park. The light house is 40 feet (12 m) tall and 270 feet (82 m) above sea level. As of 2016, and for the foreseeable future, the light is still in operation as an essential aid to navigation.

== Light sources ==
The lighthouse has had four different light sources during its history. First, it had an oil wick lamp, and then an oil vapor lamp. Three different fuels were used: whale oil, lard oil, and kerosene. Electricity wasn't introduced to the surrounding area and light house until the 1950s.

Since Point Sur was a major point used for navigation, it was equipped with first-order Fresnel lens, the largest made at the time. The lens was more than 6 feet (2 m) in diameter and 9 feet (3 m) tall. It weighed 4,330 pounds and included 16 panels of prisms, each with a bulls-eye in the center surrounded by concentric rings of prismatic glass. Its light beam could be seen to the horizon, which for the Point Sur light, at 270 feet (82 m) feet high, is 23 miles (37 km).

The entire structure, including the pedestal and clockworks was 18 feet (5 m) tall and weighed 9,570 pounds (4,341 kg). Each ring projects the light beyond the previous one.

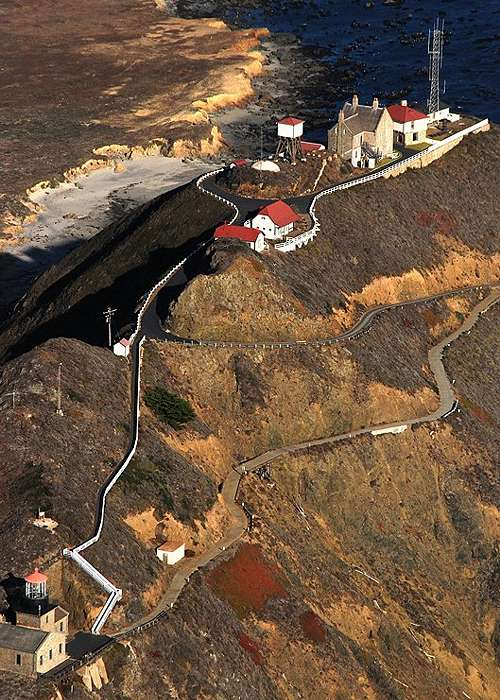
Lighthouse and related buildings in 2008.

=== Foghorns ===
In dense fog, the light beam might not be visible, so the lighthouse had a foghorn to alert ships. A coal-powered foghorn was installed when the light was used, but this labor-intensive system was replaced as soon as better technology was available. A steam-driven fog signal was installed by the turn of the century. It was fired by wood harvested from the redwoods of Big Sur. The steam boiler used about 100 cords of wood per year.

Diaphone horns were placed on top of the fog-signal room from 1935 to 1960. The two horns produced a two-tone "bee-oh" sound. In 1972, the "Super Tyfon Double Fog Signal," named after the giant Typhon from Greek mythology, was put into use. This system consisted of two compressed air horns sounding simultaneously, and could be heard up to 3 nautical miles (6 km) away. The modern electric tone fog signal was a 12 volt high frequency fog signal with a sound range of half a nautical mile. The high frequency was very effective in fog.

=== Structures ===
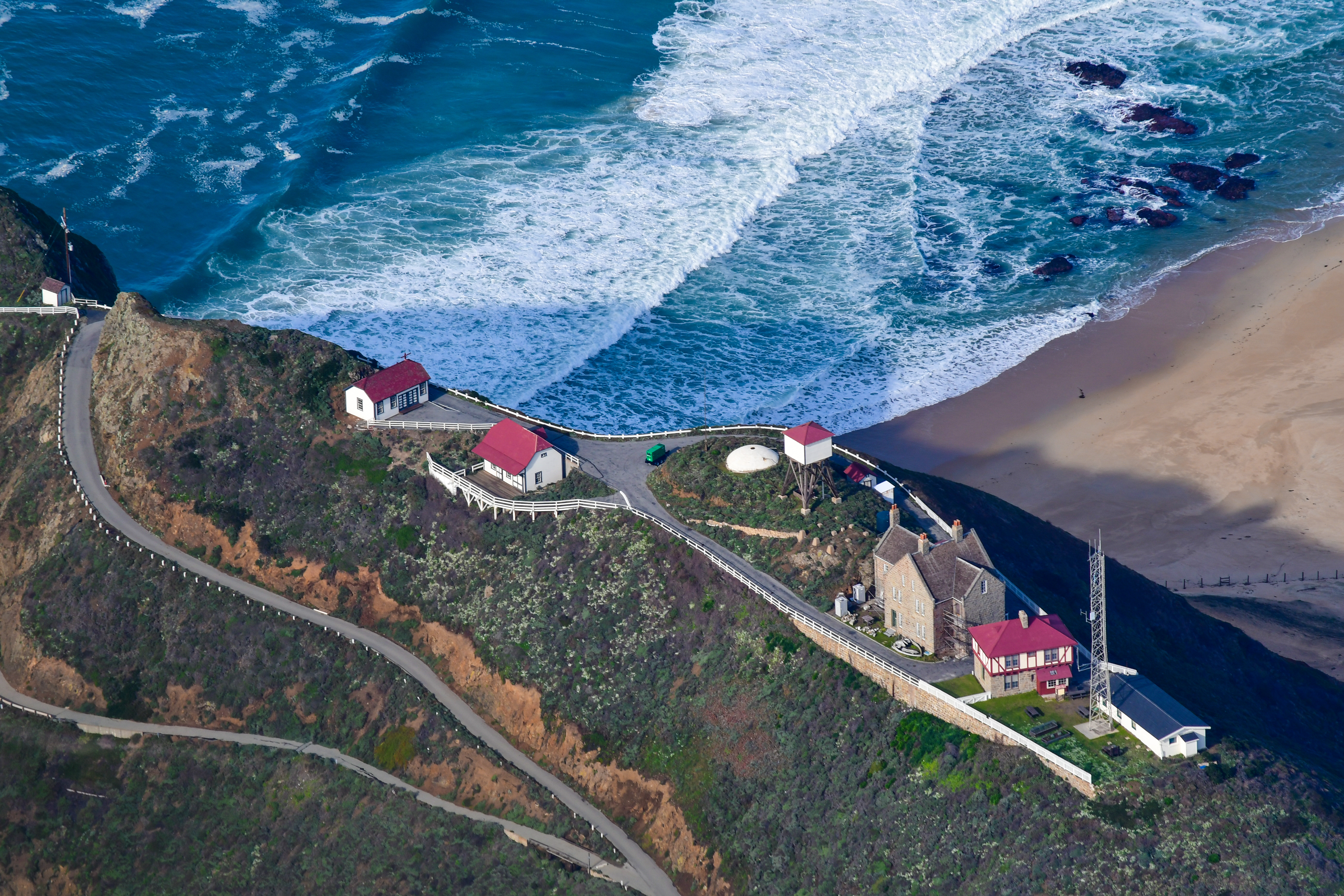
Aerial photo of Point Sur State Historic Park.

The station's staff was a head keeper and three assistant keepers. The families of the keepers lived at the station. The station had separate residences for the head keeper and the assistant keepers.

The lighthouse keepers and their families were relatively isolated at Point Sur. The station included all facilities needed for them to be self-sustaining. There was a well in the sand flats at the base of the rocks and a pump that filled a 53,000 US gallons (200,627 L) cistern (later replaced by a water tower) at the station. A barn and a blacksmith shop was built. A carpenter shop held supplies for the keepers to do their own maintenance. The lamp tower, oil room, and fog signal room were all combined into one building because of limited space. The Old Coast Road connected the station to Monterey, but it was a nearly a full day's trip via wagon until the northern portion of the macadam Cabrillo-San Simeon Highway was completed in 1924.

== History ==
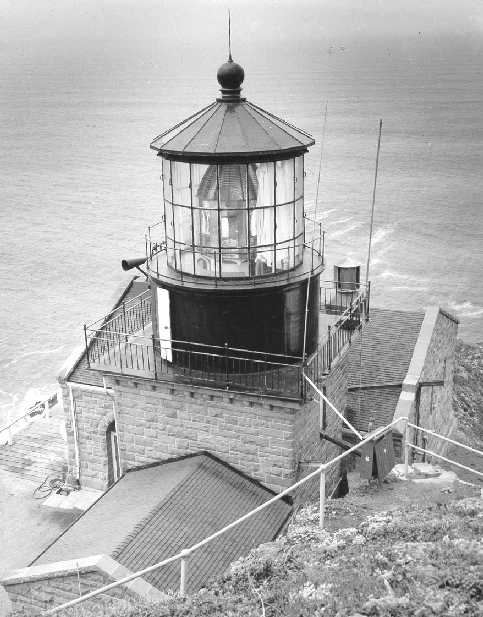
The original Fresnel lens structure, now in storage, is much larger than the modern electric light installed in 1978.

In 1793, British explorer George Vancouver described the "small, high, rocky lump of land nearly half a mile from the shore." Point Sur has been a hazard to ships since California was first settled, and increased shipping traffic during the California Gold Rush beginning in 1849 caused many wrecks. In 1874, the United States Lighthouse Service (USLS) board stated,

Vessels leaving San Francisco for the south having proceeded as far as Pigeon Point Light, take their departure for Point Sur, some sixty miles distant, the great indentation of Monterey Bay intervening. Vessels to the southward bound to San Francisco having arrived at Piedras Blancas, take their departure for Point Sur again about the sixty miles distance. Hence, Point Sur is a most important point and should be the sight of a light house. In considering the various points on the California coast where lighthouses are still required Point Sur claims the place of greatest importance."

=== Funding ===
In 1886, Congress finally appropriated $50,000 (equivalent to $1.79 million in 2025) for construction of a lighthouse at Point Sur. Funding ran out and construction was stopped for several months until Congress appropriated another $50,000 in 1887.

=== Construction ===
In 1888, Joseph Post won the government contract to construct the road from the coastal road to the base of Point Sur.

The point was originally over 360 feet (110 m) above sea level, and was only 10 to 12 feet (3.0 to 3.7 m) wide at the top. Twenty-five men were hired to build the road, lighthouse, and adjacent buildings.

The workers leveled the top to create room for the necessary buildings. They quarried sandstone and granite. To transport the rock and building materials to the base of the point, they built 500 feet (150 m) of railway track and a corduroy road (made from wooden planks) across the narrow, sandy neck of land that connected the point to the mainland. They built a 395-step staircase from the base to the peak. They also built a tramway to carry supplies from the base of the rock to the peak.

By the end of the first year, all the rock had been quarried and construction of many buildings was well underway. The Lighthouse Board hoped the construction would be completed by the end of 1888, but an additional $10,000 was needed. In 1887–88, Congress paid $69,100.69 to three individuals to finish the station. The light station was completed and the lantern lit on August 1, 1889.

=== Isolated facility ===
Life on Point Sur was very isolated. The Old Coast Road that connected the Big Sur coast to Monterey was often impassable during bad weather.

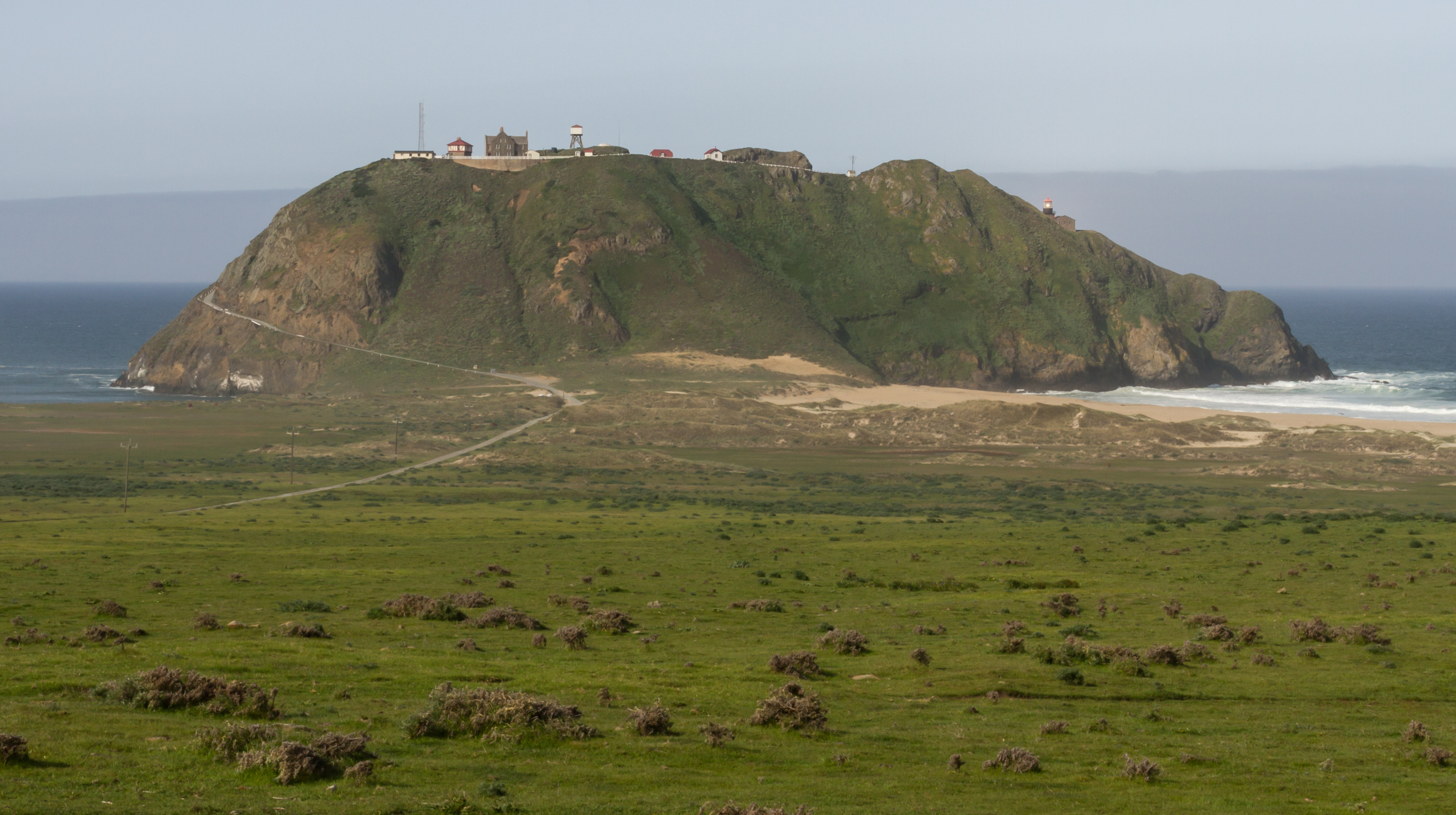
Point Sur, as seen from Highway 1

The U.S. Lighthouse Service provided a horse and wagon to get mail and supplies from Pfeiffer's Resort (now part of Pfeiffer Big Sur State Park). Each family was allotted a garden area for fresh vegetables.

=== Point Sur landing ===
Bulk supplies such as coal, firewood, animal feed, and some food came on a lighthouse tender about every four months. One function of these long, broad ships was to service remote lightstations inaccessible by land. The tender would anchor in a dog-hole ports south of the lightstation and send in a 20-foot whaler towing a skiff, both loaded with supplies. The sacks and barrels were hoisted in cargo nets to a platform at the base of the rock. They were then secured to a flat railcar and winched up to the dwelling area using a steam-driven donkey engine.

Like most remote lightstations, Point Sur was very self-sufficient. As the years passed, life became increasingly less isolated at Point Sur after the completion of the northern portion of Highway 1 in 1924, connecting Big Sur with Monterey to the north. Prior to the construction of Highway 1, the California coast south of Carmel and north of San Simeon was one of the most remote regions in the state, rivaling nearly any other region in the United States for its difficult access.

=== Coast Guard ownership ===
In 1926, the U.S. Coast Guard assumed responsibility for all aids-to-navigation. Lighthouse Service employees were absorbed into the new program, and allowed to become either members of the U.S. Coast Guard or remain civil service employees.

=== Historical landmark status ===
The site is now registered as California Historical Landmark #951. In 1991, the old lighthouse and a 37-acre (15 ha) area was listed on the U.S. National Register of Historic Places as Point Sur Light Station. In 2004, the Coast Guard transferred the building and land to California Department of Parks and Recreation.

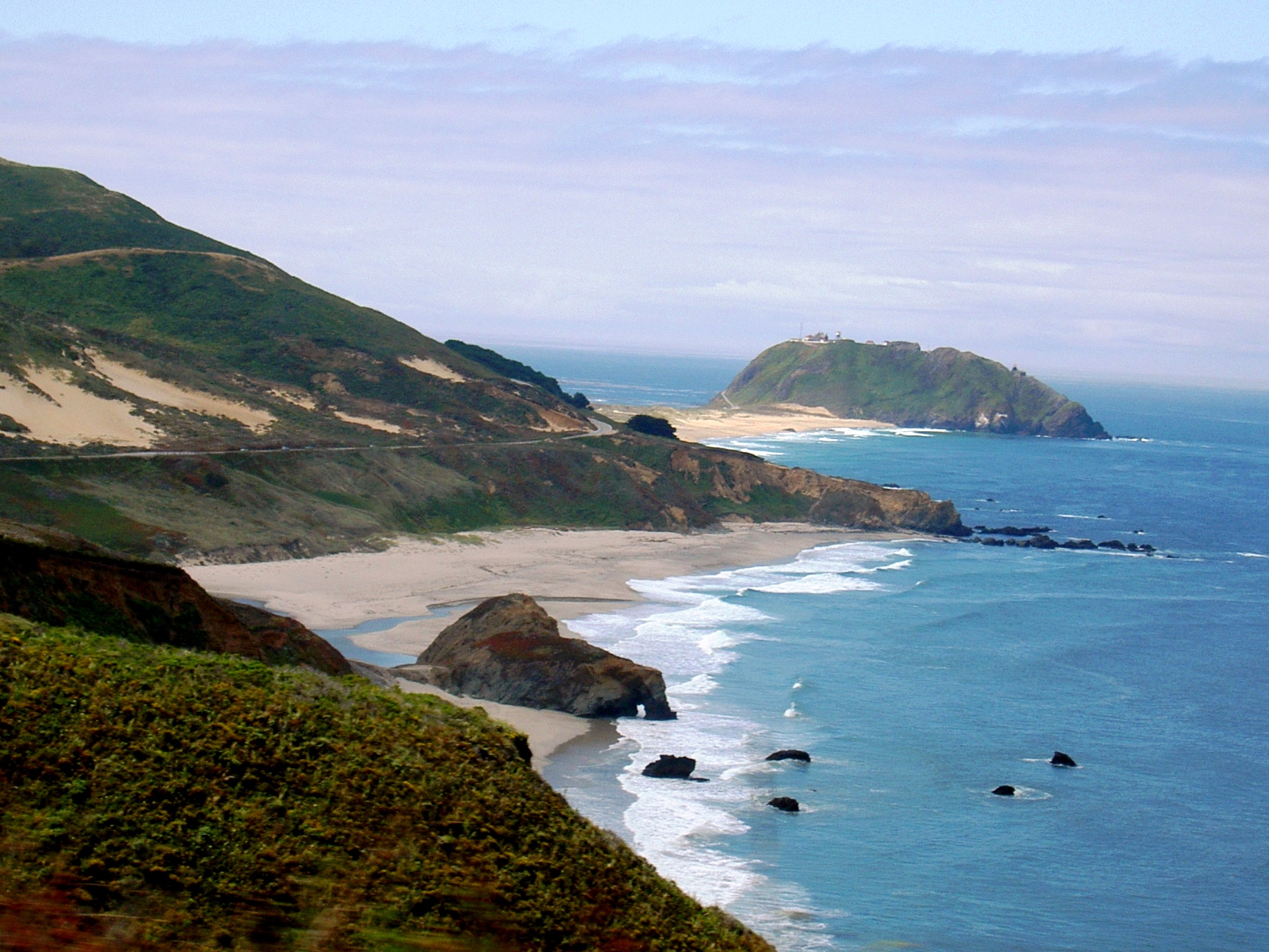
Point Sur, seen from the north on Highway 1

=== Fresnel lens ===
The original Fresnel lens was moved in 1978 to the Allen Knight Maritime Museum of Monterey, where it was an exhibit. The Maritime Museum ceased operation and was renamed the Museum of Monterey. The museum no longer wanted to retain the Fresnel lens as part of its collection. Interested individuals and groups began efforts to return the lens to the Point Sur Light Station. The lens is still owned by the United States Coast Guard who had to approve returning the lens. The nonprofit Central Coast Light Keepers collected more than $100,000 in donations to pay to return the lens. The project was approved in late 2017. The lens was disassembled, restored, and placed in storage until it can be moved to the lighthouse and reassembled in the lighthouse tower.

=== Shipwrecks ===
Notable shipwrecks occurring near Point Sur:

- April 20, 1875 – Ventura
- April 22, 1894 – SS Los Angeles. The only witnesses were the survivors. The captain of the ferry Eureka met survivors at the Pacific Coast Steamship company's wharf in Los Angeles and discouraged them from talking to reporters.
- December 5, 1909 -Majestic
- October 3, 1915 – Catania
- July 21, 1916 – Shna-Yak
- September 23, 1921 – G.C. Lindquer
- September 16, 1922 – Thomas Wand
- March 4, 1923 – Babinda
- April 4, 1930 Panama
- March 30, 1930 – Rhine Maru
- November 25, 1933 – Lupine
- February 13, 1935 – USS Macon (ZRS-5)
- May 24, 1946 – Frank Lawrence
- October 24, 1947 – Sparrows Point
- May 14, 1956 Howard Olsen

=== Head lightkeepers ===
- James Nightwine (1889–1890)
- John F. Ingersoll (1890–1901)
- Ora O. Newhall (1901–1908)
- John W. Astrom (1908–1927)
- William Mollering (1927–1931)
- Thomas Henderson (1932–1938)
- Charles R. Coursey (1938–1944)

== In popular culture ==
In 1967, the lighthouse (including the lantern room) and its surrounding buildings, were used as a filming location for an episode of the WWII-themed TV series, The Rat Patrol, entitled "The Two If By Sea Raid" (airdate: 12/18/67), standing in for a Nazi-held lighthouse on the Mediterranean coast of North Africa.

The lighthouse was rumored to be haunted and the location was investigated by the Travel Channel Ghost Adventures paranormal reality TV show.

== See also ==
- List of lighthouses in the United States
