= USS Flag =

Gunboat of the United States Navy

History

United States
- Name: USS Flag
- Builder: Birely & Lynn
- Launched: 1857
- Acquired: 26 April 1861
- Commissioned: 28 May 1861
- Decommissioned: 25 February 1865
- Fate: Sold 12 July 1865

General characteristics
- Type: Steamship
- Displacement: 938 long tons (953 t)
- Length: 193 ft (59 m)
- Beam: 30 ft 10 in (9.40 m)
- Draft: 15 ft (4.6 m)
- Propulsion: 400 hp (300 kW) Merrick & Sons Steam engine; screw-propelled
- Speed: 12 knots (22 km/h; 14 mph)
- Complement: 116
- Armament: 6 × 8 in (203 mm) Parrott rifles

USS Flag was a screw steamship in the Union Navy during the American Civil War. She is listed as "3rd rate".

== Service history ==
Flag was purchased on 26 April 1861 at Philadelphia as Phineas Sprague, converted as a warship at the Washington Navy Yard, and renamed and commissioned on 28 May 1861, Lieutenant Commander L. C. Sartori in command. When first armed, the ship had six 200-pounder (8 in (203 mm)) Parrott rifles. In 1863 she was re-armed with one 300-pounder (8 in (203 mm)), four 200-pounder, and two 30-pounder (4.2 in (107 mm)) Parrott rifles. Flag reported for duty in the South Atlantic Blockading Squadron at Charleston, South Carolina on 6 June 1861. Aside from periods in the North for repairs, she patrolled the coastal waters of the Carolinas until early 1865. Flag captured or shared in the capture of many blockade runners.

On 24 November, she joined Seneca and Pocahontas in taking possession of Tybee Island, evacuated previously by the Confederates, and two days later drove several southern ships back into Fort Pulaski, from which they were attempting to sail. She participated in the capture of Fernandina, Florida in March 1862, and in the general engagement of the fleet with the forts in Charleston Harbor on 7 April 1863. She returned to New York on 16 February 1865, was decommissioned there on 25 February, and sold on 12 July.

== See also ==
- Union Navy
- Battle of Fort Pulaski
