= Novelty Iron Works =

Former ironworking firm in New York City

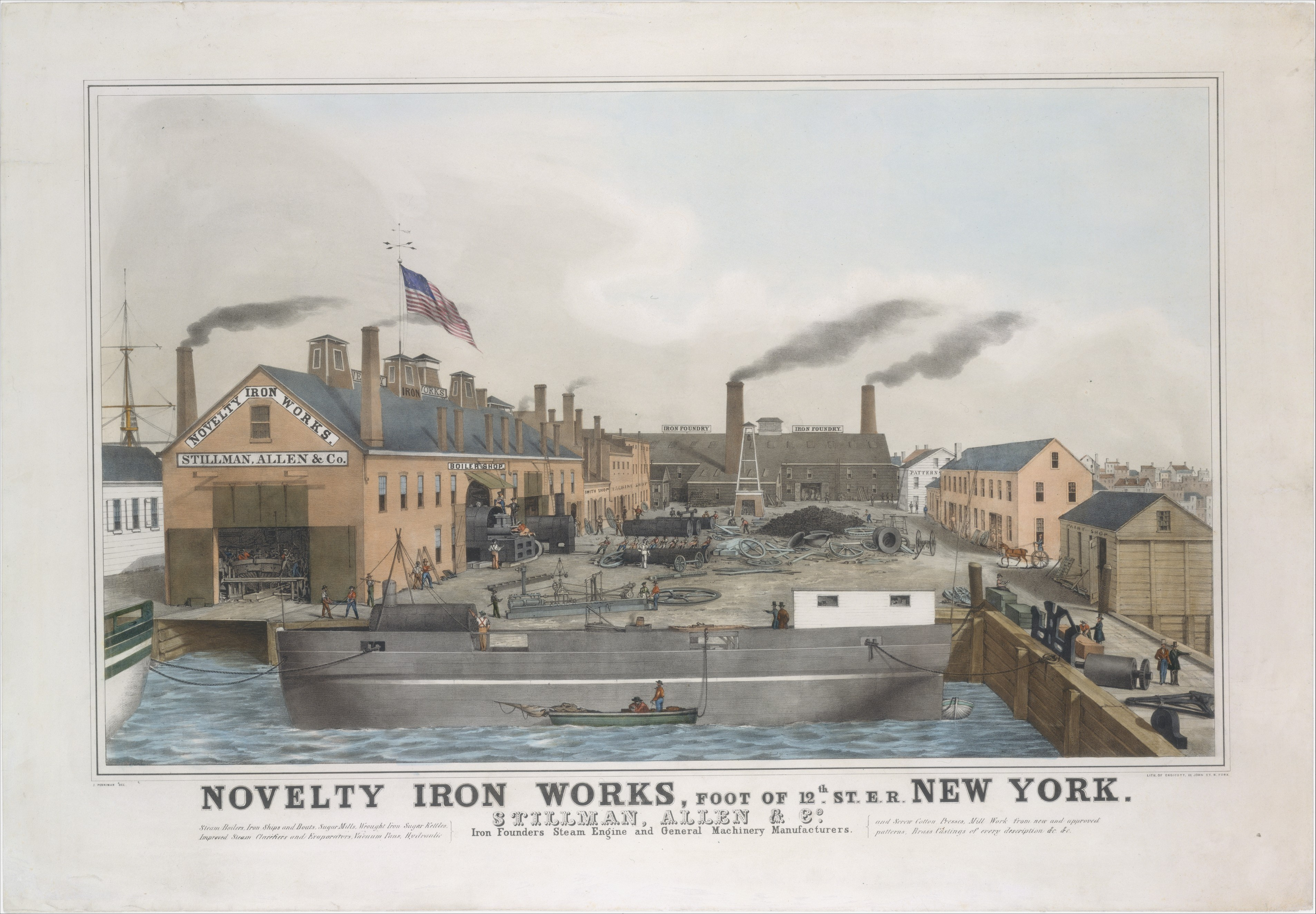
Novelty Iron Works at foot of 12th Street on the East River of Manhattan (1841-44)

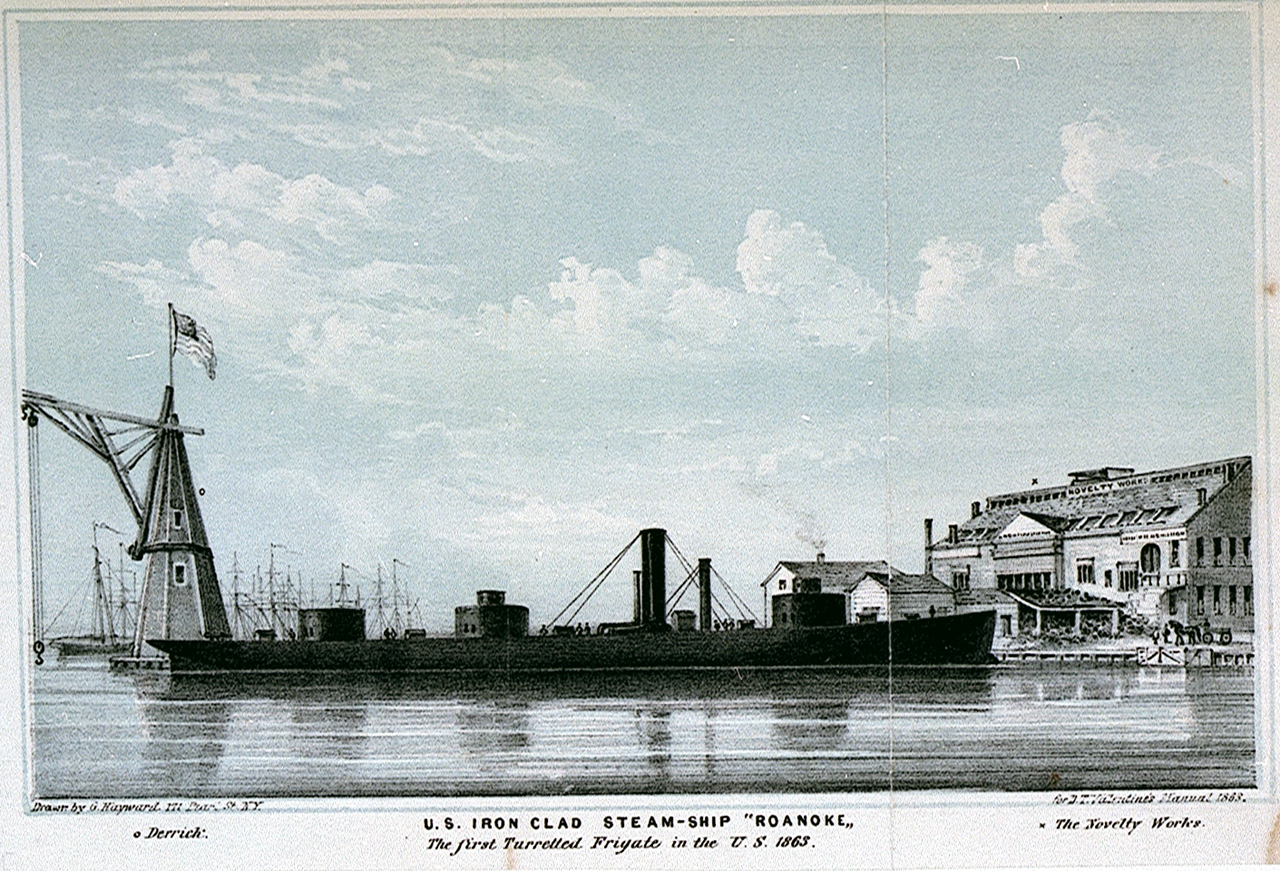
Iron clad steam-ship Roanoke The first turretted frigate in the US in 1863, sitting here to the right of the Novelty Works

The Novelty Iron Works was an ironworking firm founded to make boilers in New York City, located on East 12th street in Manhattan. The founder was the Rev. Eliphalet Nott President of Union College of Schenectady, New York. Eliphalet Nott had invented a boiler and established the works to commercialize his invention. Among the first boilers was used to provide steam for his pleasure boat named the Novelty. This was used to demonstrate the boiler and so the community referred to it as the Novelty Iron Works. It was however registered as the firm of H. Knott & Company. The works was reorganized first as the firm of Ward Stillman & Co. then Stillman, Allen & Co. from 1842 until 1855 with the recruitment of Horatio Allen. In 1855 it was incorporated under its common name and continued operating until 1870. Although they were not the largest principals, the family of Eliphalet Nott long continued involvement in the ironworks as ownership changed through different firms.

As the only New York City firm capable of producing large scale bent iron plates in the 1860s, Novelty Iron Works was contracted to produce the turret for the ironclad U.S.S. Monitor, which was constructed and launched at nearby Continental Iron Works in Greenpoint, Brooklyn.
