= USRC Kankakee =

Pawtuxet-class cutter of the U.S. Revenue Cutter Service

History
- Name: USRC Kankakee
- Namesake: Kankakee River
- Operator: United States Revenue Cutter Service
- Builder: Westervelt & Son
- Cost: $103,000
- Launched: 15 Sep 1863
- Completed: Nov? 1864
- Decommissioned: 1867, prior to 28 May
- Renamed: Kawachi (merchant service)
- Fate: Broken up after February 1869

General characteristics
- Class & type: Pawtuxet-class cutter
- Displacement: 350 tons
- Length: 130 ft (40 m)
- Beam: 26 ft 6 in (8.08 m)
- Draft: 5 ft 4 in (1.63 m) (aft)
- Depth of hold: 11 ft (3.4 m)
- Propulsion: 1 × two-cylinder oscillating steam engine; single 8 ft (2.4 m) screw
- Sail plan: Topsail schooner
- Speed: About 12 knots
- Complement: 7 × officers, 34 enlisted
- Armament: 1 × 30-pound Parrott rifle; 5 × 24-pound howitzers

USRC Kankakee was a Pawtuxet-class screw steam revenue cutter built for the United States Revenue Marine during the American Civil War.

Kankakee spent most of her brief career with the Revenue Marine operating in and around Charleston, South Carolina; Norfolk, Virginia; and Philadelphia, Pennsylvania. In addition to her regular revenue cutter duties, she was used to transport customs officials and was later assigned to test safety equipment.

After less than three years in service, Kankakee was sold in 1867 due to dissatisfaction with her machinery. She later sailed to Japan, where she was renamed Kawachi, she was broken up in or after 1869.

== Construction and design ==
Kankakee was one of six Pawtuxet-class screw schooners ordered by the Treasury Department in 1863 for the United States Revenue Marine. She was built in New York City by J. A. Westervelt for the sum of $103,000 and launched on 15 September 1863.

Kankakee was 130 feet (40 m) long, with a beam of 26 feet 6 inches (8.08 m) and hold depth of 11 feet (3.4 m). Draft is uncertain but was probably around 6 feet (1.8 m).^{[a]} Like the other ships of her class, her contract called for a hull of oak, locust and white oak, strengthened with diagonal iron bracing.

Kankakee was powered by a two-cylinder, geared screw, oscillating engine with 36 inch bore, 30-inch stroke and 10-inch steam cut-off, built by J. & R. I. Gray at their New York facility, the Phoenix Iron Works. Steam, at a pressure of about 22 psi, was supplied by a single tubular boiler. The engine drove a single 8-foot diameter, 12-foot pitch screw propeller geared upward at a ratio of 3:1, delivering a speed of about 12 knots.

A fatal accident involving Kankakee occurred while her engines were being installed at the foot of Horatio Street, North River on June 1, 1864. While Kankakee's smokestack was being hoisted in, the steamboat Mary Powell passed by, the wash from which caused the smokestack's supporting guys to slip and send it crashing to the deck of an adjacent schooner. Two men were killed by the falling smokestack, and several other persons injured. A coroner's inquest held a few days later concluded that no fault could be attributed, but recommended that in future installations of the type, six guys be used instead of the usual four.

Kankakee was either brig or topsail schooner-rigged for auxiliary sail power. Her armament consisted of a single 30-pounder Parrott rifle, and five 24-pounder Dahlgren guns, including two pivot guns. She had a crew complement of 41 officers and enlisted men.

== Service history ==
=== Trial trip ===
Kankakee conducted her trial trip on 1 November 1864, leaving port at 10 Am with a number of officials aboard, including the Superintendent of Repairs and Supplies, Thomas B. Stillman, and several officers of the Revenue Marine. During the trial, Kankakee attained a speed of 12 knots, with the engine operating at 36 rpm and the propeller at 108, reportedly making her the fastest vessel of the Pawtuxet class. A New York Times correspondent despatched for the occasion observed that the ship "makes a very fine appearance on the water. She steers beautifully, turning around in a very short space".

After returning to dock at 4 pm, the vessel was met by Collector of Ports Simeon Draper, and a second trip made for his benefit. Draper declared himself "very much pleased" with Kankakee's performance, while the other officials "pronounced unqualifiedly" in favor of the ship.

=== Revenue Marine service, 1864–67 ===
Soon thereafter, Kankakee received her commission, but scarcely had she entered service than tragedy struck again. On December 26, 1864, Kankakee's commander, Captain Richard A. Morsell of Washington D.C., fell overboard from the wharf at Hoboken, N.J., while attempting to signal another vessel. He clung to a "pile" wharf support until he was rescued twenty minutes later and taken to a hotel. All attempts to revive him failed. One of his officers was with him when he slipped into the water. A coroner's inquest was held in Hoboken on December 27, and rendered a verdict that he came to his death from "psychrophobia". Captain Morsell was one of the youngest naval captains.

In 1865, Kankakee, now under the command of a Captain Baker, voyaged to the Southern States with two agents of the Treasury Department tasked with setting up a system of customs for the ports of the recently vanquished Confederacy. After calling at Mobile, Alabama and Havana, Cuba, Kankakee arrived at Charleston, South Carolina on 27 July for coaling before returning to New York. The Customs office at Charleston, meanwhile, was said to be "rapidly assuming a prosperous aspect".

By September, Kankakee was homeported in Norfolk, Virginia. The following month, Kankakee arrived at Fort Monroe with the schooner Hannah Matilda under tow, which had lost her sails. On February 9, 1866, Kankakee spoke the ship Grey Eagle, laden with coffee from Rio Janeiro, and supplied her with provisions. On the 24th, Kankakee, now under the command of Captain George Slicer, was reportedly preparing to transfer to Philadelphia, while the revenue cutter Mocassin was set to take over Kankakee's duties in Virginia waters.

In February 1867, the crew of Kankakee suffered another misfortune when one of the ship's firemen was knocked down by a tender in Grand Street, Manhattan, reportedly suffering serious injuries. In April, Kankakee was utilized by the Commission on Life-Saving Apparatus to test a number of different designs for detaching and lowering lifeboats. "The merits of a fog-horn" were also tested. Captain Slicer of Kankakee was later thanked for his assistance to the Commission.

=== Later service ===
By this time, the Revenue Marine had decided to rid itself of a number of the Pawtuxet-class cutters on the basis that their engines were too complicated. Kankakee was consequently laid up, and sold on 28 May 1867. She later voyaged to Japan, whereby February 1869 she had been renamed Kawachi. Kawachi was eventually broken up.

== Notes ==
^{a} See note a in the Pawtuxet-class cutter article.
