= Merrimack Valley =

Region in the U.S. states of New Hampshire and Massachusetts

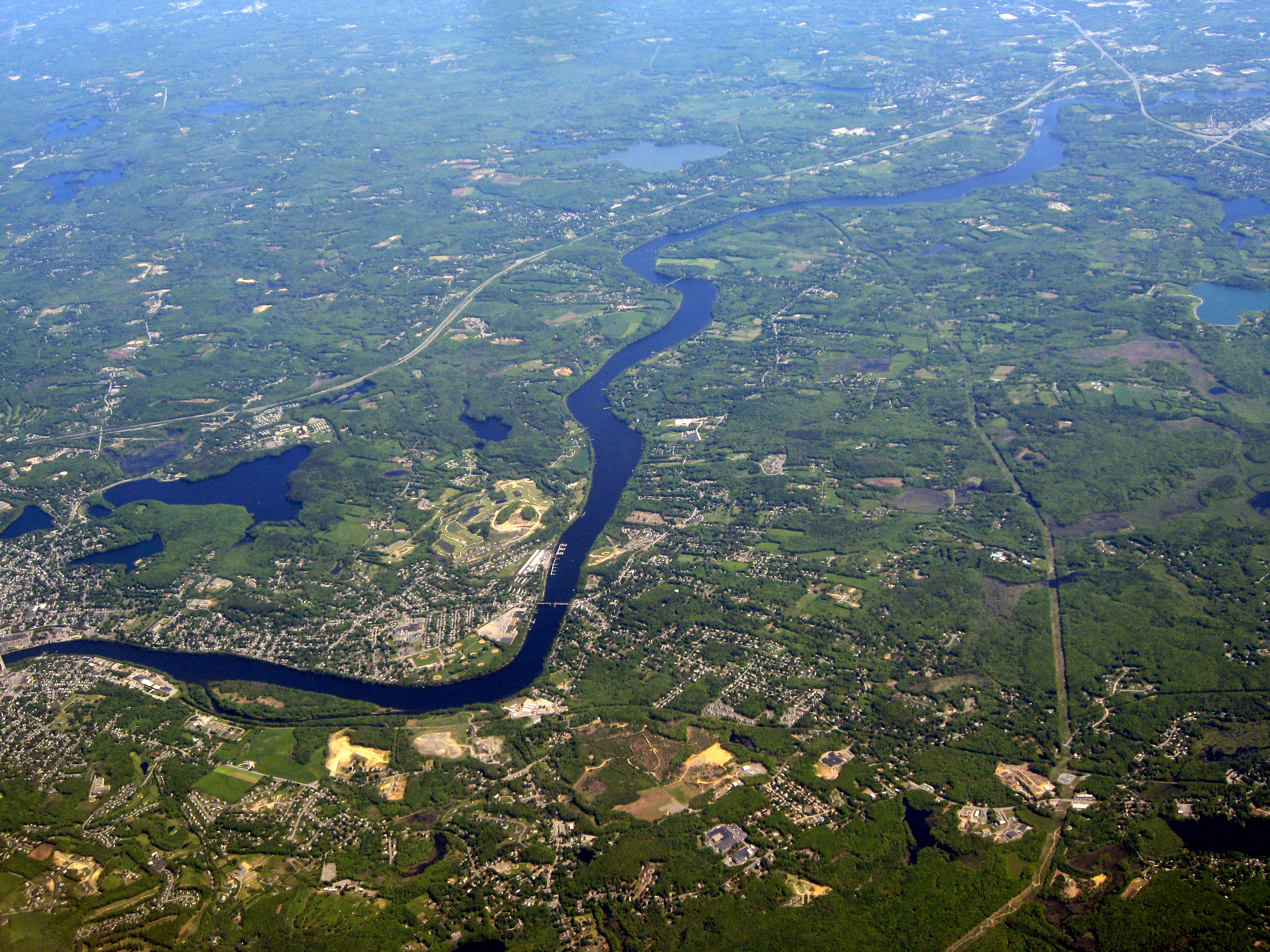
- The Merrimack River in Haverhill flowing to its mouth in Newburyport, Massachusetts
- Long-axis direction: Northwest–southeast

Geology
- Type: River

Geography
- Location: Massachusetts; New Hampshire
- Population centers: In New Hampshire: Concord; Manchester; Nashua; In Massachusetts: Lowell; Lawrence; Haverhill
- Borders on: White Mountains; Plum Island, Massachusetts; Atlantic Ocean
- Traversed by: Interstate 93, Interstate 495, Haverhill Line (MBTA)
- Rivers: Merrimack River

The Merrimack Valley is a bi-state region along the Merrimack River in the U.S. states of New Hampshire and Massachusetts. The Merrimack is one of the larger waterways in New England and has helped to define the livelihood and culture of those living along it for millennia.

Major cities in the Merrimack Valley include Concord, Manchester, and Nashua in New Hampshire, and Lowell, Lawrence, and Haverhill in Massachusetts. The Valley was a major center of the textile industry in the 19th century.

== Geography and demographics ==
=== Massachusetts ===
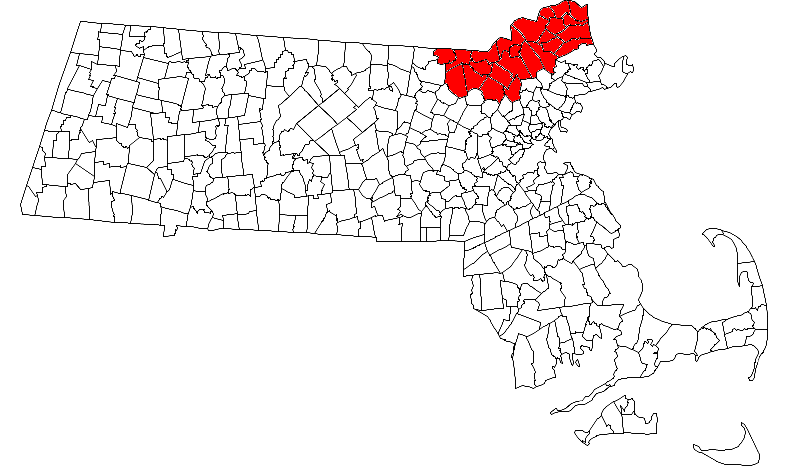
Towns in the Merrimack Valley of Massachusetts

The Merrimack Valley area in Massachusetts is a community of towns and cities flanking the Merrimack River along the New Hampshire border, a portion of which is defined by a line approximately 3 miles (5 km) north and west of the Merrimack. The cities (marked with italics) and towns in this area are:

- Amesbury
- Andover
- Billerica
- Boxford
- Chelmsford
- Dracut
- Dunstable
- Georgetown
- Groveland
- Haverhill
- Lawrence
- Littleton
- Lowell
- Merrimac
- Methuen
- Newbury
- Newburyport
- North Andover
- Rowley
- Salisbury
- Tewksbury
- Tyngsborough
- West Newbury
- Westford
- Wilmington

The population of the region in 2010 was 631,477, slightly more than that of Boston, and about one tenth of the state's.

The Merrimack Valley contains a mixture of 19th-century industrial cities and mill complexes built to take advantage of the river's waterpower, modern suburbs (many built over towns dating from the 17th century), and some relatively rural areas. The western part, including Greater Lowell and Haverhill–Lawrence–Methuen, is generally more urban than the eastern part. The entire Merrimack Valley region in Massachusetts is part of Greater Boston. Broader definitions for the region include other areas of Middlesex County, including the Route 2 corridor from Devens east to Lexington.

Automobile travel through the Massachusetts section of the Merrimack Valley is served primarily by Interstate 495. From Lowell and Lawrence, U.S. Route 3 and Interstate 93, respectively, head north along the valley, joining in Manchester, New Hampshire.

=== New Hampshire ===
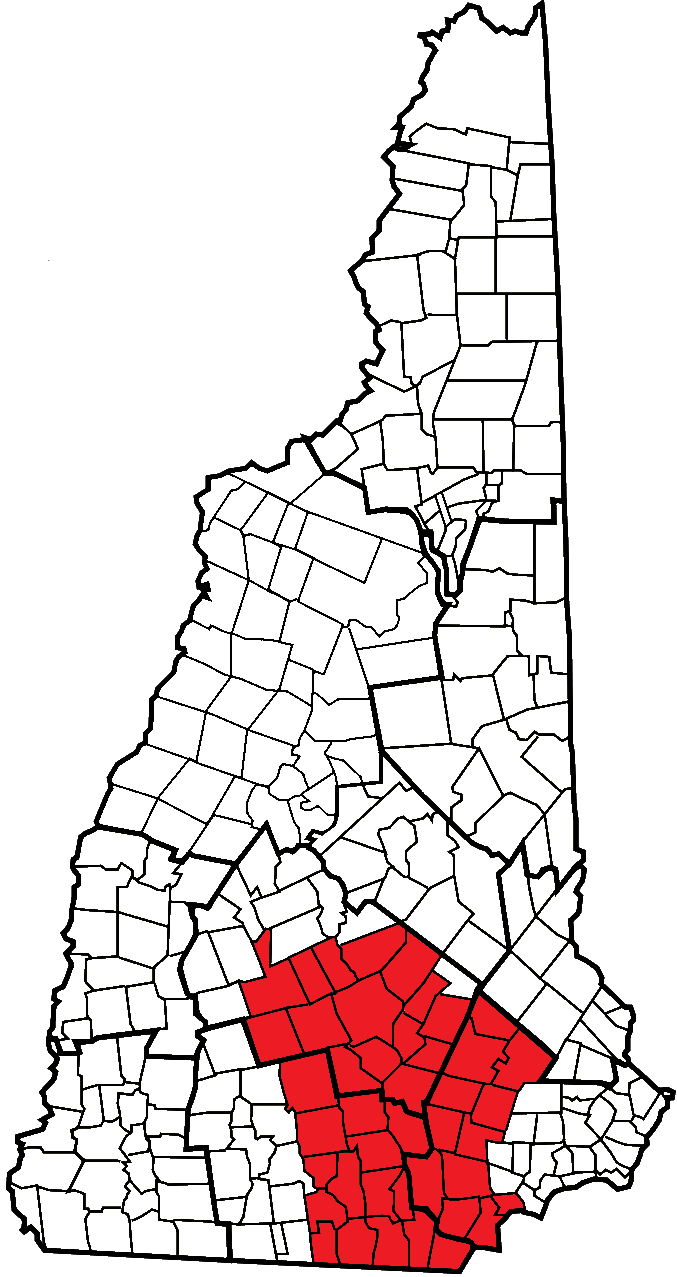
Towns in the Merrimack Valley of New Hampshire

In New Hampshire, the Merrimack Valley Region is an area of the south-central part of the state, about 35 miles (56 km) wide, centered on the Merrimack River, and running from Canterbury south to the Massachusetts border. Henniker marks the western extent, and Nottingham the eastern. It includes parts of Hillsborough, Rockingham and Merrimack counties, namely the following towns and cities (in italics):

- Allenstown
- Amherst
- Atkinson
- Auburn
- Bedford
- Boscawen
- Bow
- Brookline
- Candia
- Canterbury
- Chester
- Chichester
- Concord
- Deerfield
- Derry
- Dunbarton
- Epsom
- Goffstown
- Hampstead
- Henniker
- Hollis
- Hooksett
- Hopkinton
- Hudson
- Litchfield
- Londonderry
- Loudon
- Manchester
- Merrimack
- Milford
- Mont Vernon
- Nashua
- New Boston
- Northwood
- Nottingham
- Pelham
- Pembroke
- Plaistow
- Raymond
- Salem
- Sandown
- Weare
- Webster
- Windham

The state capital, Concord, and the state's two largest cities, Manchester and Nashua, are in the valley. Manchester has a large regional airport, with scheduled commercial services.

To the east is the Seacoast Region, to the west is the Monadnock Region, and to the north is the Lakes Region.

Interstate 93 bisects the region, which is also served by Interstate 293, U.S. Route 3, and many New Hampshire state highways.

== History and culture ==
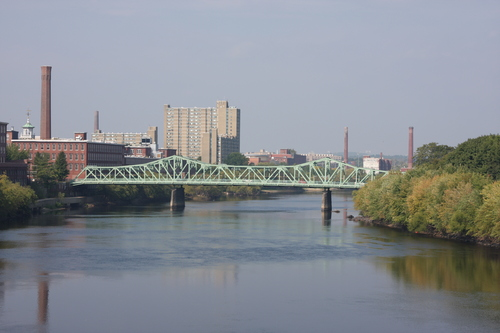
The second largest city on the Merrimack River, Lowell, owes its existence to the waterpower the river provided to run its mills.

=== Pre-contact ===
The original settlers of the Merrimack Valley were various tribes of the Pennacook Indians. The river provided an easy means of transportation, an exceptional source of salmon as well as other fish, and the land along the river banks was suitable for hunting and sometimes farming.

=== Colonization and the early federal period ===
The earliest European records of the river date to a French expedition under Pierre du Guast, Sieur de Monts, in 1605. By 1629, the British were moving into the area, and a land grant delineated by the river was made to a Jonathan Wheelwright in 1629.

The city of Newburyport, first settled in 1635, at the river's mouth, became an important shipbuilding center during the colonial era, using lumber floated downriver from the White Mountains. Its prominence was diminished when the Middlesex Canal was completed in the first quarter of the 19th century, allowing lumber to be shipped directly downriver from the White Mountains to Charlestown, Massachusetts, and improving connections between Boston and the Merrimack Valley. Prior to this time, other small canals had been built around falls and rapids to make the Merrimack navigable, such as the Pawtucket Canal at East Chelmsford, which became Lowell.

=== Industrial revolution ===
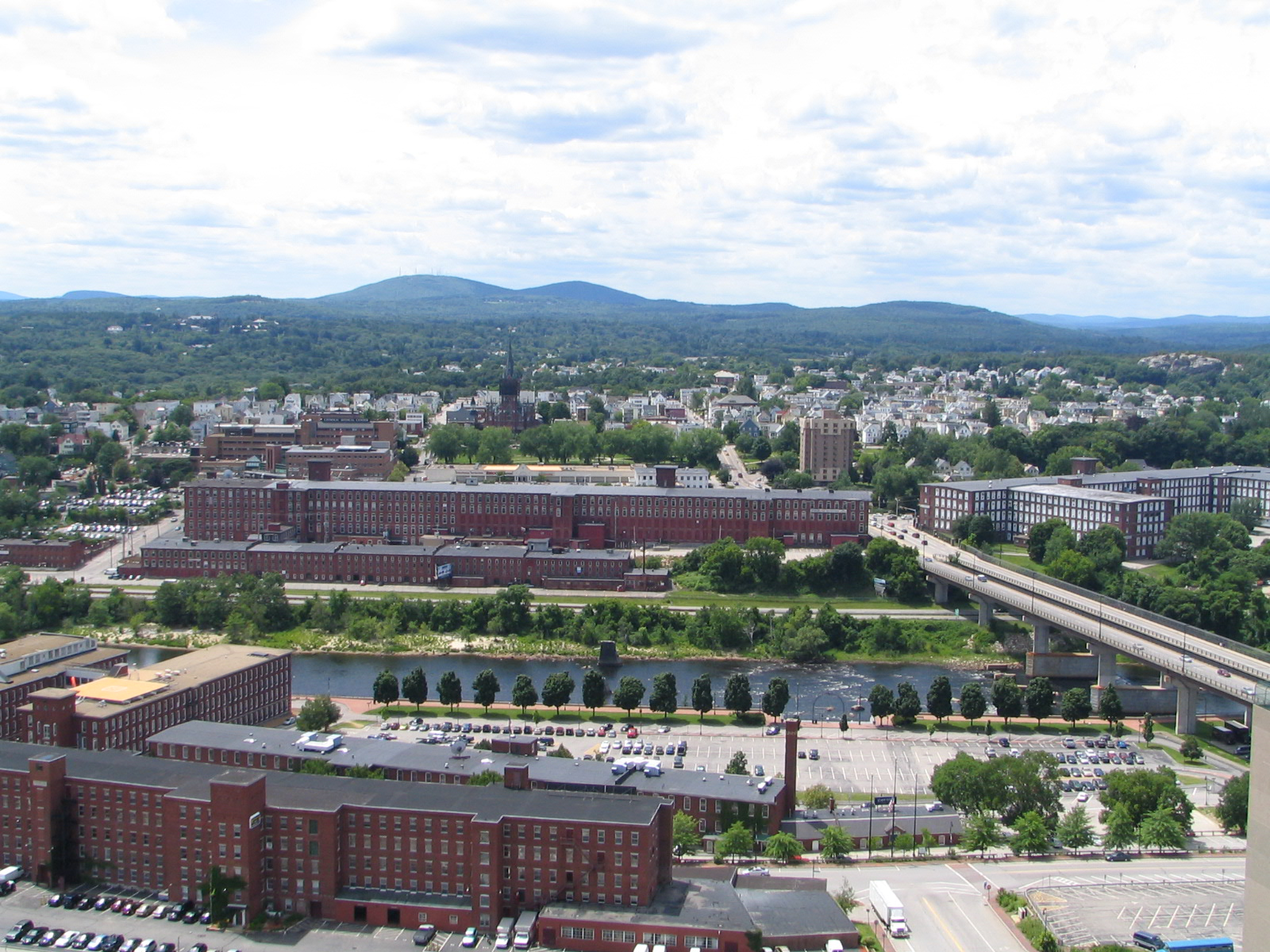
The Amoskeag Mills in West Manchester, New Hampshire, circa 2006. The massive structure once housed the largest cotton textile manufacturing plant in the world. Since the late 20th century, it has been rehabilitated for mixed use development.

While the Merrimack had been used for small manufacturing concerns for decades, in the early 1820s, a group of investors from Boston founded the city of Lowell, to take advantage of the 32-foot (9.8 m) drop of the Merrimack over the Pawtucket Falls. Lowell, the first large-scale planned textile center in America, remained the nation's largest into the 1850s. Textile production spread up and down the Merrimack Valley in both states for the next century, but eventually was eclipsed after the Second World War.

Manchester's Amoskeag Mills was once the largest cotton textile plant in the world. Other major textile companies based in the Merrimack Valley included the Merrimack Manufacturing Company in Lowell, the American Woolen Company in Lawrence (headquarters moved to Andover in 1919), Pemberton Mill in Lawrence, and the Nashua Manufacturing Company in its namesake city. Lawrence was the site of the Bread and Roses strike, a landmark event in the history of labor relations in the United States.

=== Modern era ===
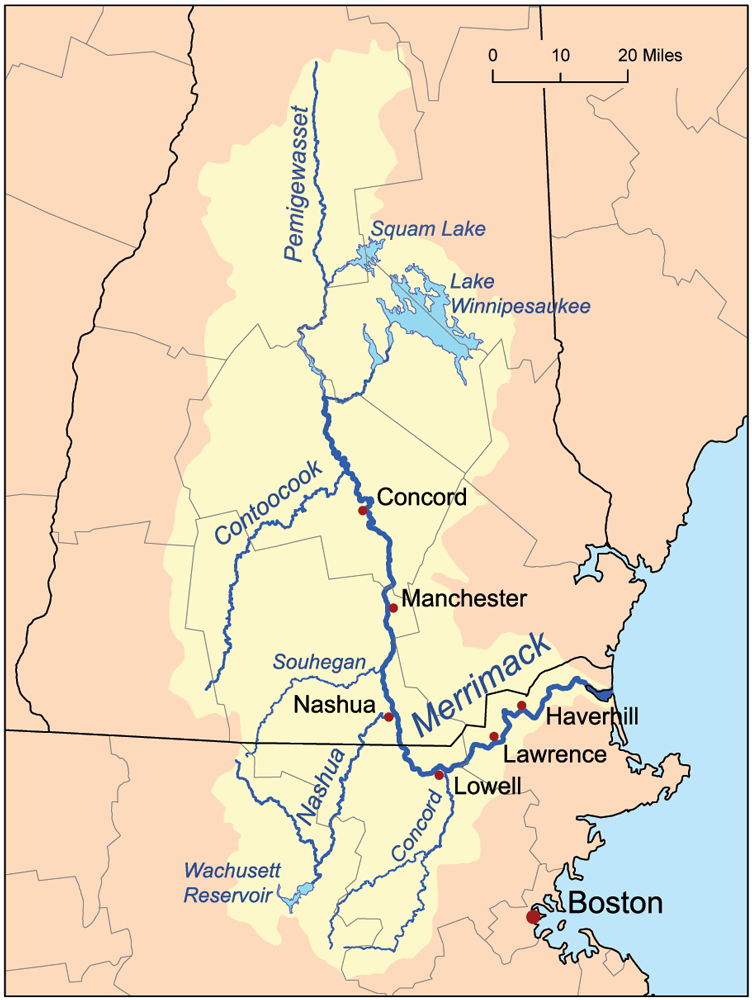
Merrimack River watershed

After World War II, the textile industry collapsed rapidly. After a few decades of stagnation, the "Massachusetts Miracle" came to the valley, bringing the headquarters of Wang Laboratories to Tewksbury, then Lowell. Apollo Computer located in Chelmsford and Nashua Corporation in Nashua moved beyond printing to computer products. The defense industry, for example, Raytheon in various sites and Sanders Associates in Nashua, became a major local employer. Increased development pressure from Greater Boston and the proliferation of the automobile pushed development outside of Massachusetts Route 128 to Interstate 495 and up Routes 3 and 93 into southern New Hampshire, greatly increasing the populations of these communities over the postwar years.

On September 13, 2018, several gas lines suffered leakage due to high pressure in the tubes of Columbia Gas of Massachusetts, causing several fires and explosions, and homes were evacuated.

=== Culture ===
The Merrimack River Valley is considered the "Valley of the Poets" by some local artists and poets.

Anne Bradstreet was a founding mother of three towns in the Massachusetts Bay Colony: Boston, Cambridge (then Newtowne), and the original Andover Parish, known now as North Andover, where she lived and wrote for the last half of her life. The first published poet of the New World, she died in North Andover in 1672.

In Haverhill and Amesbury, the family of John Greenleaf Whittier settled. Mr. Whittier was so well thought of during his lifetime, his birthday was celebrated as a national holiday.

Lawrence is the birthplace of actress Thelma Todd, composer/conductor Leonard Bernstein and actor/singer Robert Goulet. Robert Frost spent his teenage years there, as did his future wife, Elinor Miriam White. They were co-valedictorians (1892) at Lawrence High School. Actress Bette Davis and the writer Jack Kerouac were born in Lowell.

West Newbury is the birthplace of John Cena, a WWE professional wrestler, actor, former rapper, and television personality.

The Merrimack Valley is one of the few places in the United States where the card game Forty-fives is popular.

The Merrimack Valley was once home to numerous apple and fruit orchards, of which several still remain. Some of the larger remaining orchards include Apple Hill, Cider Hill, Long Hill Orchard, Mann Orchards, and Smolak Farms. Apple picking is a popular pastime in the Merrimack Valley during the late summer and fall months.

The Merrimack Valley's leading boarding schools, such as Brooks School in North Andover, Massachusetts; Phillips Academy in Andover, Massachusetts; St. Paul's School in Concord, New Hampshire; and The Governor's Academy in Newbury, Massachusetts, provide cultural institutions to the public, including the Addison Gallery of American Art and the Robert S. Peabody Museum of Archaeology in Andover.

== Economy ==
=== Massachusetts ===
The Merrimack Valley in Massachusetts is divided into three New England city and town areas (NECTAs) by the U.S. Office of Management and Budget: Lowell–Billerica–Chelmsford, MA–NH; Lawrence–Methuen Town–North Andover, MA–NH; and Haverhill–Newburyport–Amesbury Town, MA–NH. The M3 Coalition serves several towns that expand the definition. Most large employers are in the sectors of health care and higher education. Institutes of higher learning include Hockey East rivals UMass Lowell and Merrimack College. The region was once a technology hub, reaching its peak during the 1970s and 1980s with corporations such as Wang Laboratories in Lowell among the largest technology employers, though it has since gone defunct. Software company UKG is one of the largest private employers in the region, as is Philips, whose medical division is based in Andover. The defense industry also has had a major presence in the Merrimack Valley, Massachusetts-based Raytheon has several large plants and offices in the Merrimack Valley, and BAE Systems Inc. also employs many people. Due to its proximity to Boston, the region also serves as a bedroom community for employers in Boston. Many major highways (including I-93, I-95, and US 3) and several heavily used lines of the MBTA Commuter Rail system provide easy access to the city from the Merrimack Valley.

Attractions include:

- Chain Bridge (Massachusetts), an historic bridge spanning Amesbury and Newburyport
- Deer Island (Amesbury, Massachusetts), an island in the Merrimack in Amesbury
- Haverhill Historical Society Historic District
- John Greenleaf Whittier Homestead, birthplace of the famous poet
- Lawrence Heritage State Park
- Lowell's Boat Shop, the birthplace of the fishing dory
- Lowell National Historic Park
- Machine Shop Village District, North Andover
- Maudslay State Park, a sprawling park in Newburyport along the banks of the Merrimack
- Museum of Printing, Haverhill
- Newburyport Historic District
- Newburyport Harbor Rear Range Light
- Pawtucket Falls (Massachusetts), famous waterfall in Lowell
- Plum Island (Massachusetts), a barrier island at the mouth of the River
- Rocks Village Historic District, an early ferry crossing point between East Haverhill and West Newbury
- United States Customhouse (Newburyport, Massachusetts), a former custom house-turned-museum

Institutions of higher education include:

- Massachusetts School of Law, Andover
- Merrimack College, North Andover
- Northern Essex Community College, Haverhill
- University of Massachusetts Lowell, Lowell
- Middlesex Community College, Lowell/Bedford

Merrimack Street is a neighborhood of Merrimack Valley located in the city of Methuen, Massachusetts. It is centered directly alongside the Merrimack River and located off I-495 (Massachusetts) and bordering the neighboring Lawrence, Massachusetts

Merrimack Street has long been home to Methuen's Italian community, and it remains so today. On Merrimack Street, Numerous Italian restaurants and specialty shops, e.g. Dolce Freddo Gelato, Piro's Bakery & Pizzeria, Borrelli's, and Romano's Pizzeria, among many others, along with numerous Spanish and Puerto Rican Establishments.

Towards the end of Summer and Early September, Italian and Non-Italian Americans alike come to the nearby Three Saints Feast, which is located in the neighboring city of Lawrence, MA. The Feast features vendors and amusements found all across Massachusetts, It also honors the "Three Saints" Alphius, Philadelphus and Cyrinus

=== New Hampshire ===
While the textile industry that served as the underpinning of the Merrimack Valley has disappeared, the region has since transferred to other economic activities. Sanders Associates, a major defense contractor based in Nashua has, through several mergers and acquisitions, become a division of BAE Systems Inc. and is one of the regions largest employers. Technology companies also have a large presence in the region, including mobile phone company Verizon, which is the largest private employer in Manchester. The financial industry is also a major employer, with Lincoln Financial in Concord and Fidelity Investments in Merrimack among the largest private employers.

The area between Manchester, Nashua, and Salem was once described as the "Golden Triangle" of New Hampshire. The name was due to job growth that fueled a housing boom and led to the creation of several major new retail centers, including the Mall of New Hampshire in Manchester, the Mall at Rockingham Park in Salem, and the Pheasant Lane Mall in Nashua. This area contains roughly 30% of the population of New Hampshire.

Attractions include:

- Bear Brook State Park
- Canobie Lake Park, an amusement park
- McAuliffe-Shepard Discovery Center, a planetarium/air and space museum
- New Hampshire Historical Society Museum
- New Hampshire State House
- Pawtuckaway State Park
- Robert Frost Farm, a state historic park
- Silver Lake State Park

Institutions of higher education include:

- New England College, Henniker
- New Hampshire Institute of Art, Manchester
- Rivier University, Nashua
- Saint Anselm College, Goffstown
- Southern New Hampshire University, Manchester/Hooksett
- University of New Hampshire at Manchester
- University of New Hampshire School of Law, Concord

== See also ==
- Merrimack Valley Conference, a high school athletic conference in Massachusetts
- Merrimack Valley High School, a high school in New Hampshire
