= Pawtucket (disambiguation) =

Pawtucket is a city in Rhode Island, United States.

Pawtucket may also refer to:

- Pawtucket Falls (Massachusetts), Lowell, Massachusetts
- Pawtucket Gatehouse
- Pawtucket Canal
- Pawtucket tribe
- USS Pawtucket

== See also ==
- Pawtuxet (disambiguation)
