= Proprietors of Locks and Canals =

American corporation

The Proprietors of Locks and Canals on Merrimack River is a limited liability corporation founded on June 27, 1792, making it one of the oldest corporations in the United States. Its named incorporators were Dudley Atkins Tyng, William Coombs, Joseph Tyler, Nicholas Johnson, and Joshua Carter.

The company was founded to construct the Pawtucket Canal around the Pawtucket Falls on the Merrimack River, in East Chelmsford, Massachusetts. Over a mile long with four lock chambers, the Pawtucket Canal was finished in 1796. Although the canal allowed for lumber and other goods to be transmitted from New Hampshire to the shipyards of Newburyport, the competing Middlesex Canal, a direct route to Boston, opened just ten years later, ruining the Pawtucket's business.

In 1821, The Boston Manufacturing Company of Waltham, Massachusetts, purchased the charter of the Proprietors of Locks and Canals, incorporating it into the new Merrimack Manufacturing Company. In the early 1820s, the Pawtucket Canal became a major component of the Lowell power canal system with the founding of the textile industry at what became Lowell. In 1822 Patrick Tracy Jackson appointed himself as agent of Proprietors of Locks and Canals, gaining the ability to determine "who could start what mill and where in Lowell, and for how much".

In 1825, the corporation was reorganized again and separated from the Merrimack Manufacturing Company under the leadership of Kirk Boott. This allowed the city of Lowell to grow quickly, as many other manufacturing corporations were founded in Lowell to take advantage of the waterpower sold by the Proprietors of Locks and Canals. Paul Moody was one of their first chief engineers. In the mid-19th century, the company was under the leadership of James B. Francis, inventor of the Francis Turbine, who took over when George Washington Whistler left to work on Russia's railway system.

Noah R. Harlow served as chief engineer and paymaster from 1856 until his death in 1892.

In 1857, the Middlesex Mechanic Association recognized the work done by the Proprietors of Locks and Canals to explore the effects of burnettizing on preventing rapid decay of timbers, an effort essential for long-lasting waterway structures. The corporation still exists today, housed in the same building as Boott Hydropower, LLC, which has a small power plant on the Northern Canal in Lowell.

== Archives and records ==
- Proprietors of Locks and Canals on Merrimack River records at Baker Library Special Collections, Harvard Business School.
