= Merrimack Canal =

Canal in Lowell, Massachusetts

Coordinates: 42°38′40.1″N 71°18′49.1″W

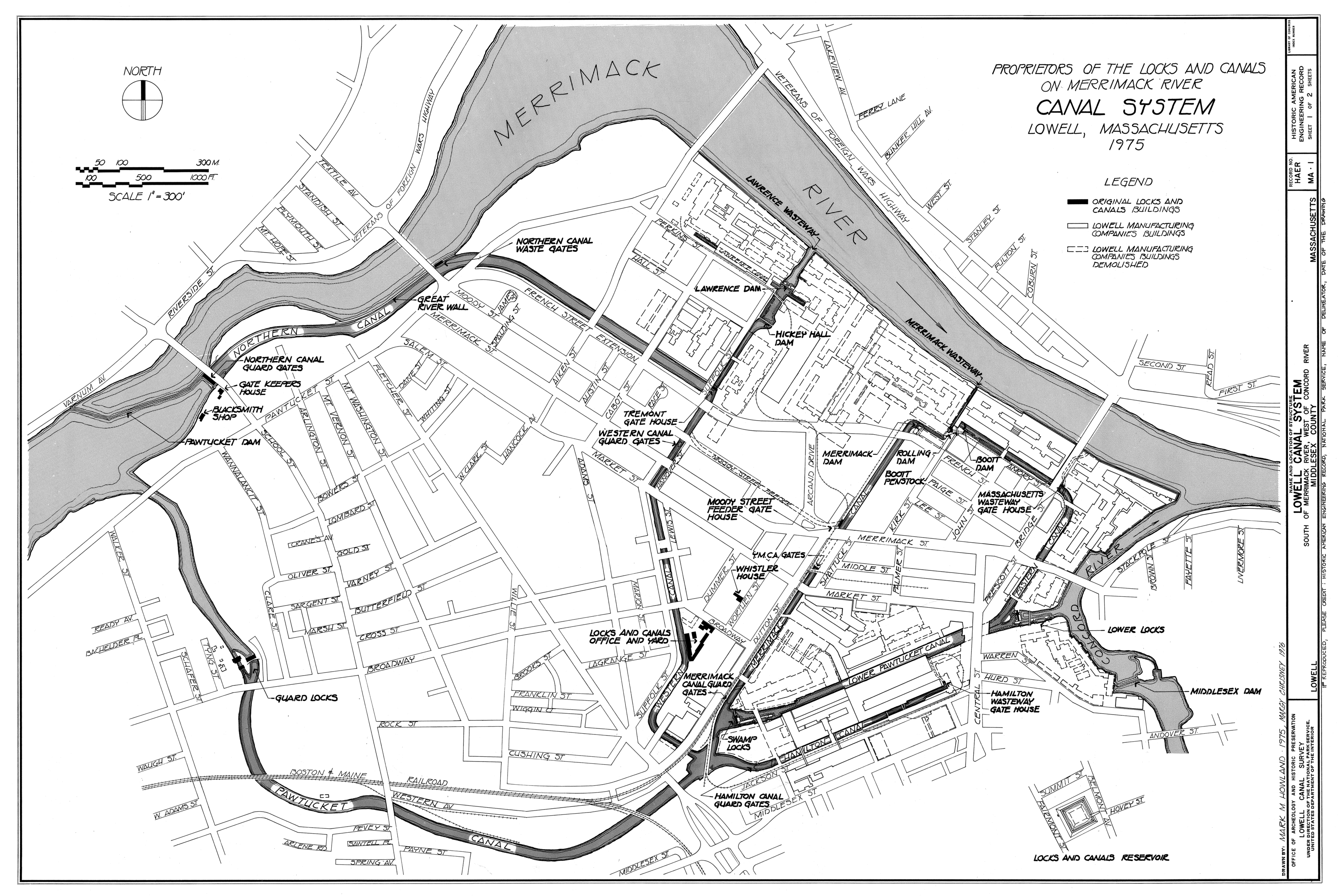
Lowell's canal system today - showing the location of the Merrimack Canal.

The Merrimack Canal is a power canal in Lowell, Massachusetts. The canal, dug in the 1820s, begins at the Pawtucket Canal just above Swamp Locks, and empties into the Merrimack River near the Boott Cotton Mills. The Merrimack Canal was the first major canal to be dug at Lowell exclusively for power purposes, and delivered 32 feet (9.8 m) of hydraulic head to the mills of the Merrimack Manufacturing Company. The Merrimack Manufacturing Company was the first of the major textile mills constructed in Lowell. It was demolished around 1960.

The canal, which runs along the southeast side of Dutton Street and then between the two halves of Lowell High School, is unique in the Lowell Canal System as it delivers the full 32-foot (9.8 m) drop of the Merrimack at once, instead of operating on a 13-foot (4.0 m) and a 17-foot (5.2 m) two-level system.

== See also ==
- Lowell Power Canal System and Pawtucket Gatehouse
