= Lowell Power Canal System and Pawtucket Gatehouse =

Historic district in Massachusetts, United States

- Lowell Locks and Canals Historic District
- U.S. National Register of Historic Places
- U.S. National Historic Landmark District
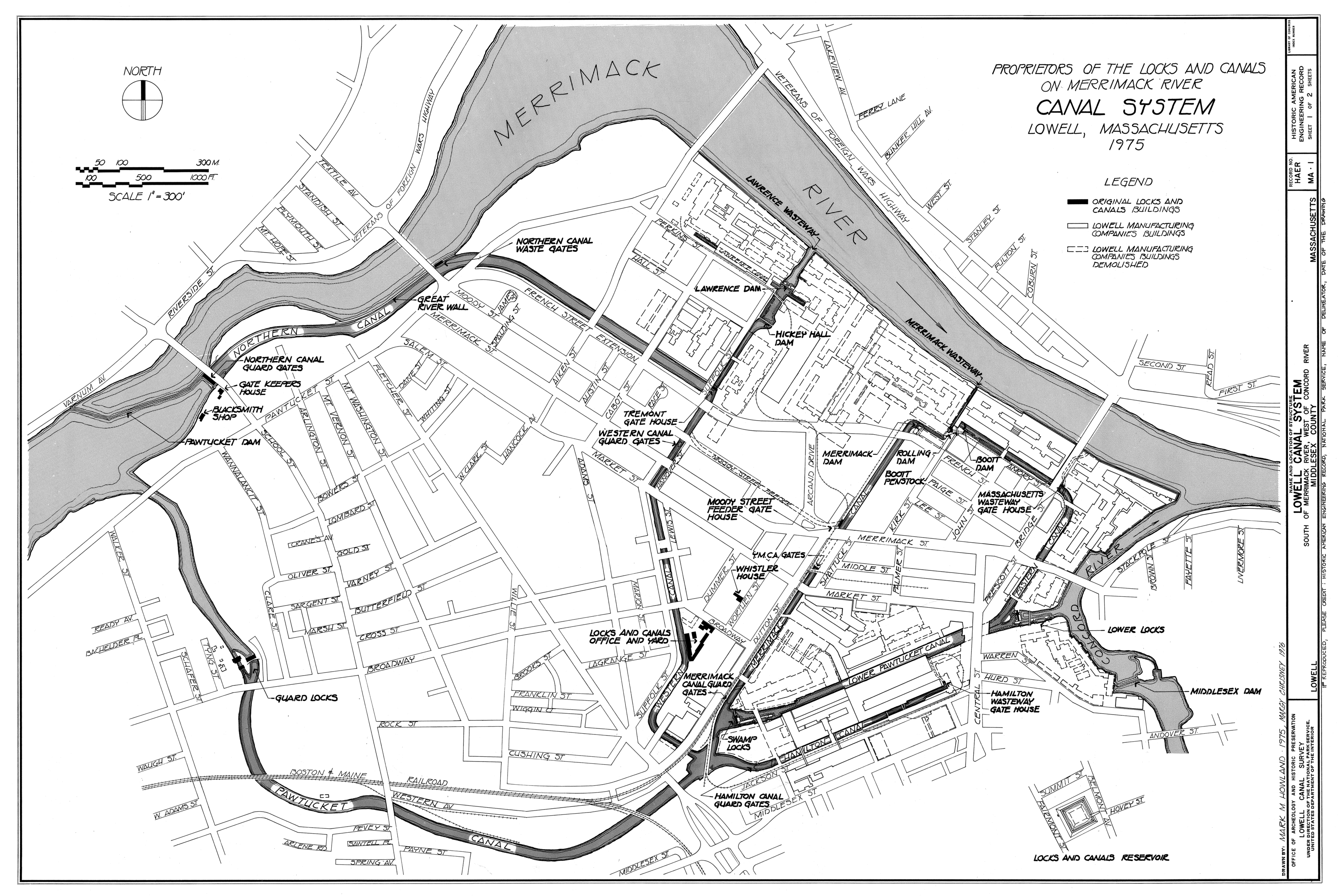
- A 1975 map showing the canal system

- Location within Massachusetts Location within the United States
- Location: Lowell, Massachusetts
- Coordinates: 42°38′44″N 71°19′12″W
- Built: 1821
- Architect: Nathan Appleton, Kirk Boott
- NRHP reference No.: 76001972

Significant dates
- Added to NRHP: August 13, 1976
- Designated NHLD: December 22, 1977

The Lowell Power Canal System is the largest power canal system in the United States, at 5.6 miles in length. It is operating through six major canals on two levels, controlled by numerous gates. The system was begun in the 1790s, beginning its life as a transportation canal called the Pawtucket Canal, which was constructed to get logs from New Hampshire down the Merrimack River to shipbuilding centers at Newburyport, Massachusetts, bypassing the 30-plus-foot drop of the Pawtucket Falls.

In the early 1820s, Associates of the recently deceased Francis Cabot Lowell bought up the old Pawtucket Canal in what was then East Chelmsford, Massachusetts. Within a few years, the new industrial center that became Lowell was using canals feeding off a widened and deepened Pawtucket Canal as a direct power source for their textile mills. The first of these canals was the Merrimack Canal, which powered the Merrimack Manufacturing Company. The repurposing of the Proprietors of Locks and Canals allowed the Associates to sell water power to other companies, starting with the Hamilton Canal, leading to the explosive growth of the town, and then shortly thereafter, city, of Lowell.

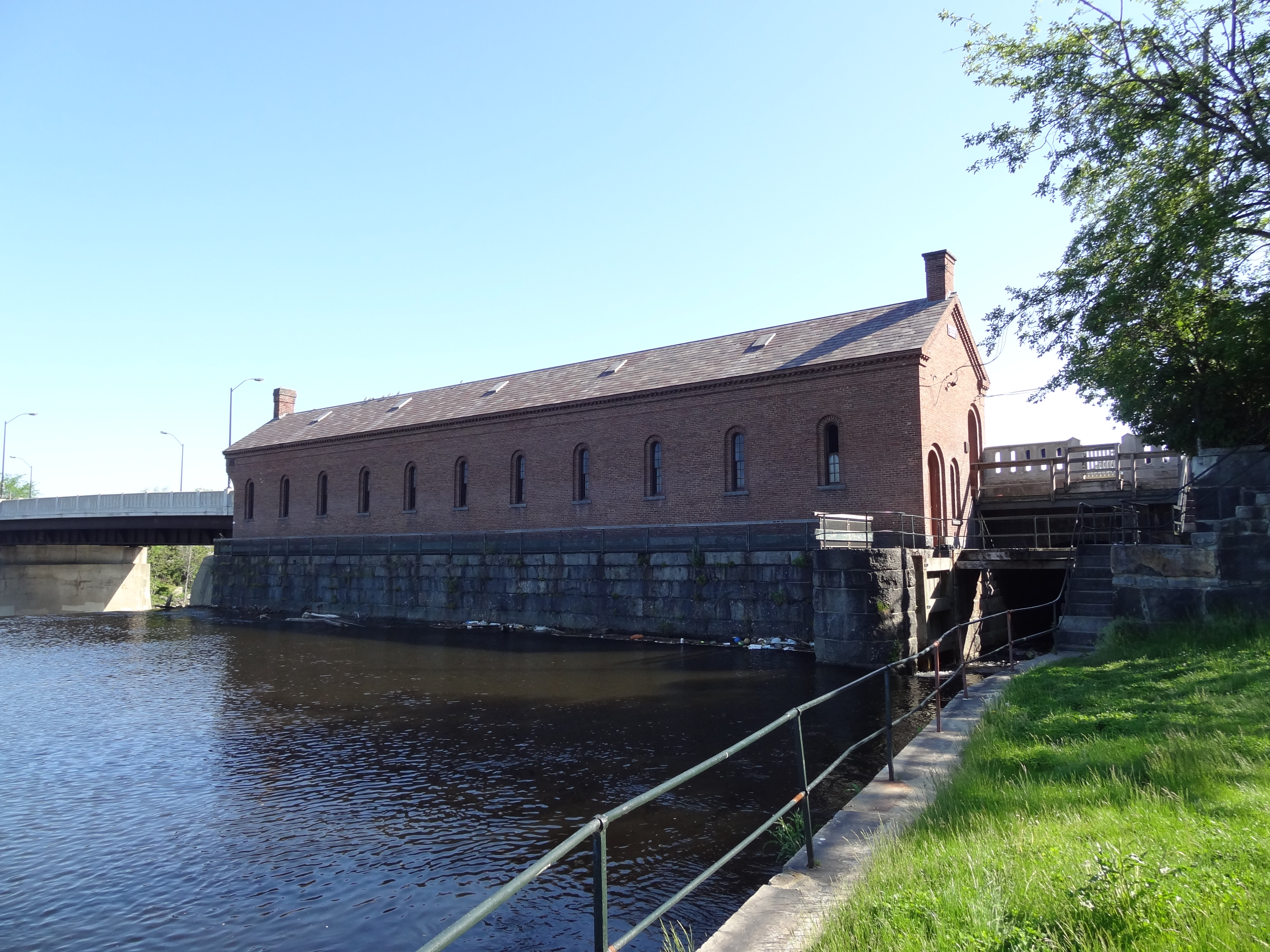
Pawtucket Gatehouse, from the above the falls side. Barge lock chamber to the right of the gatehouse.

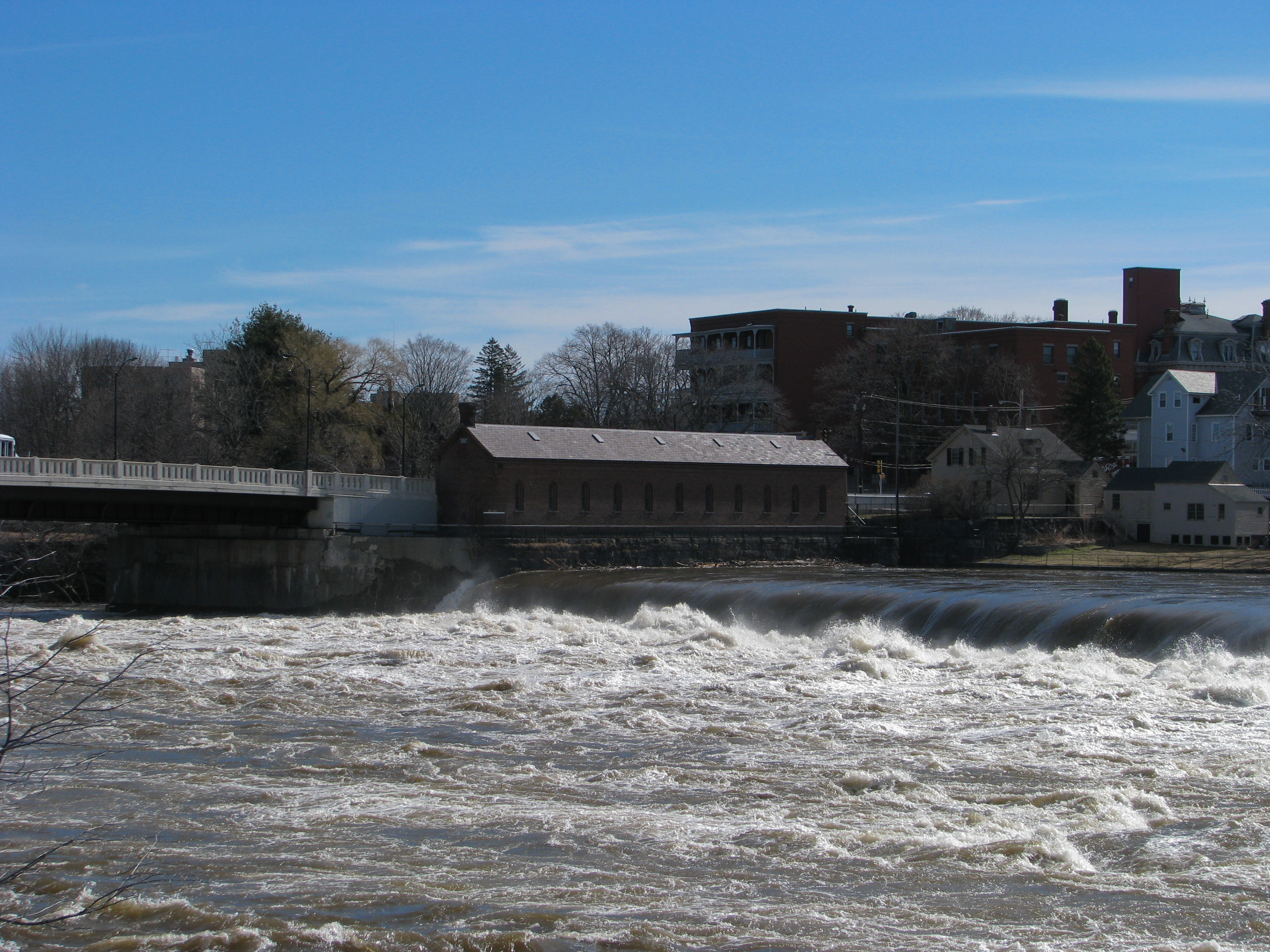
Pawtucket Gatehouse, from across the river, during a minor spring flood

By the late 1840s, Lowell's canal system was producing as much power as possible. However, the Chief Engineer of Locks and Canals, an Englishman by the name of James B. Francis devised the Northern Canal and the Moody Street Feeder, to increase the capacity of, and availability of water to various parts of, the whole system. The Pawtucket Gatehouse was constructed to control flow from behind the Pawtucket Dam into the Northern Canal.

The dam itself, which was built twenty years earlier, was lengthened at that time, diverting the entire Merrimack (during periods of lower flow) into the two canal system entrances above it. It is a stone dam topped with wooden flashboards – a system still used on this dam today. The level of the water is regulated by the flashboards and the metal pins that hold them back. When there is too much water going over the top of the dam, the pins bend backwards, releasing the boards, and the outflow of the dam is increased.

The Gatehouse contains ten wooden gates that control the flow of the Merrimack into the canal. Originally, they were opened by a Francis Turbine, also an invention of James B. Francis. Today, the Gatehouse is controlled electrically and remotely by Boott Hydroelectric, who is partially a continuation of the Proprietors of Locks and Canals, and who operates a 24-megawatt hydroplant on the Northern Canal.

The Canal System and the Gatehouse were designated a Historic Civil Engineering Landmark by the ASCE in 1984 and a Historic Mechanical Engineering Landmark by the ASME in 1985 and are part of Lowell National Historical Park. It was added to the National Register of Historic Places in 1976, and declared a National Historic Landmark the next year.

== Timeline of canals ==
- 1796: Pawtucket Canal
- 1822: Merrimack Canal
- 1825: Hamilton Canal
- 1828: Lowell Canal
- 1831: Lawrence Canal, Western Canal
- 1835: Eastern Canal
- 1847: Northern Canal, Moody Street Feeder, and Pawtucket Gatehouse

== See also ==
- List of National Historic Landmarks in Massachusetts
- National Register of Historic Places listings in Lowell, Massachusetts
