= Merrimack Manufacturing Company =

Textile manufacturer

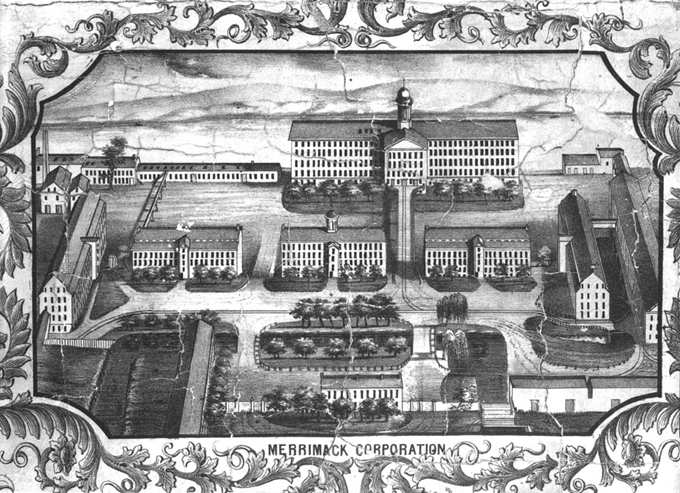
An 1850 drawing of the Merrimack Manufacturing Company

The Merrimack Manufacturing Company (also known as Merrimack Mills) was the first of the major textile manufacturing concerns to open in Lowell, Massachusetts, beginning operations in 1823.

== History ==
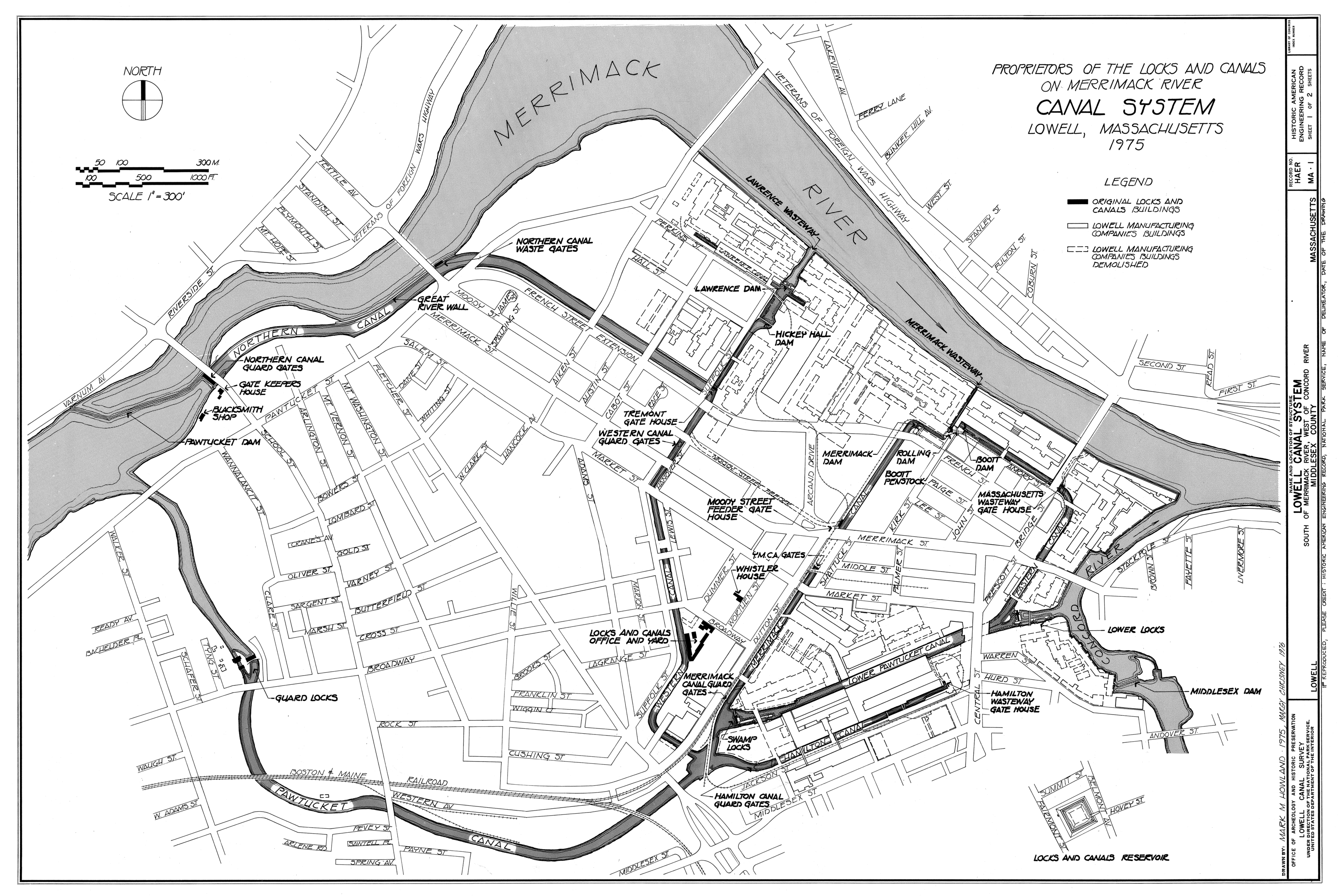
The Merrimack Manufacturing Company is shown as dotted lines (demolished) at the Merrimack River end of the Merrimack Canal

After the death of Francis Cabot Lowell of the Boston Manufacturing Company, his associates (commonly referred to as the Boston Associates) began planning a larger operation in East Chelmsford, Massachusetts, along the Merrimack River. The Merrimack Manufacturing Company, modeled after the second Boston Manufacturing Company mill, was built concurrently with the necessary canals, machine shop, dyehouse, and boardinghouses for the operatives. The system of operation the company employed became known as the Lowell System. Initially capitalized with $600,000, its typical product was calico cloth. Situated at the foot of the Merrimack Canal, the original mills received the full 32' drop of the river. Closely associated with the Proprietors of Locks and Canals and at one point, merged with the company under the same agents (such as Kirk Boott), the Merrimack Company was the "parent" company of the later Lowell firms - although they were technically competitors. The Merrimack Company also was very powerful in the politics of the settlement, later town, and later city, of Lowell.

However, as textile production in the United States shifted away from New England, the Merrimack Manufacturing Company's fortunes reversed. The company was able to survive the Great Depression due to military contracts and awards which revamped the surrounding economy; it was among the last of Lowell's textile giants to close. Shortly after it ceased operations in the late 1950s, nearly the entire complex was demolished for urban renewal in 1960. A few years later, many of the boardinghouses were destroyed as well. Today, the site is occupied by new arterial roads, parking lots, a few low-rise office buildings, and a high-rise housing tower, as well as the newer buildings of Lowell High School.

From 1900 until 1946, the Merrimack Manufacturing Company ran a plant in Huntsville, Alabama as well.

== Archives and records ==
- Merrimack Manufacturing Company records at Baker Library Special Collections, Harvard Business School.
