= James B. Francis =

British-American civil engineer (1815–1892)

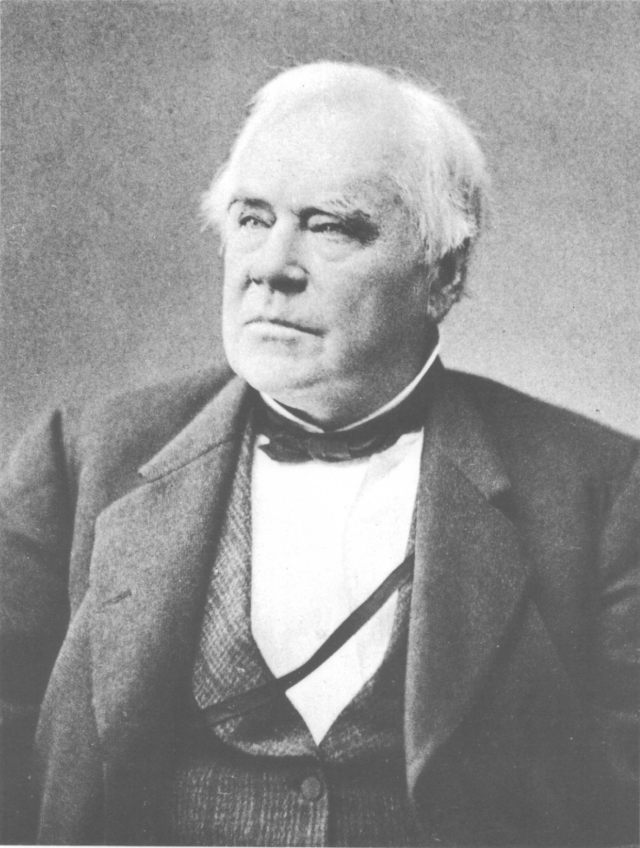
- James Francis, around 1887
- Born: May 18, 1815; South Leigh, Oxfordshire, England, United Kingdom
- Died: September 18, 1892 (aged 77)
- Scientific career
- Fields: Engineer

James Bicheno Francis (May 18, 1815 – September 18, 1892) was a British-American civil engineer, who invented the Francis turbine.

== Early years ==
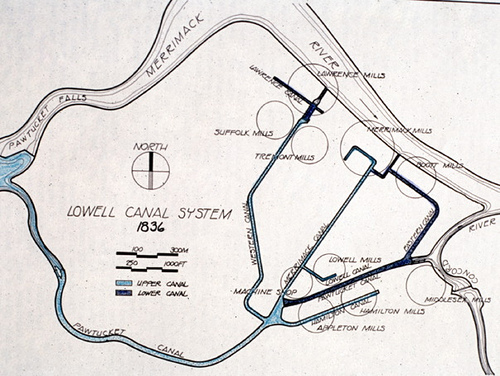
The Lowell canal system as it appeared when Francis joined the Proprietors of Locks and Canals on the Merrimack River in 1836

James Francis was born in South Leigh, near Witney, Oxfordshire, in England, United Kingdom. He started his engineering career at the early age of seven as he worked as his father's apprentice at the Porth Cawl Railway and Harbor Works in South Wales. When he turned 18, he decided to emigrate to the United States, in 1833. His first job was in Stonington, Connecticut, as an assistant to the railway engineer George Washington Whistler Jr., working on the New York and New Haven Railroad. A year later, James and his boss, Whistler, travelled north to Lowell, Massachusetts, where at the age of 19, he got a draftsman job with the Locks and Canal Company, and Whistler became chief engineer.

A few years later, in 1837, Whistler resigned, and went to work on Russia's major railroads. Before departing, he appointed Francis chief engineer, and sold him his house on Worthen Street. In same year, James married Sarah W. Brownell in Lowell on July 12. Their first son, James Jr., was born March 30, 1840, and then they had five more children.

In 1841 came his first major project for the company. Francis was to analyse how much water each mill factory was using from the company's channel system. Impressed by his abilities, the company named him "Manager of Locks and Canals" in 1845.

As manager and chief engineer, Francis was responsible for the construction of the Northern Canal and Moody Street Feeder. These two canals, built in the late 1840s and early 1850s, completed the 5.6 mile long Lowell canal system, and greatly increased the industrial power of the thriving industrial city's mill complexes.

During his work on the Lowell systems, Francis was also consulted on many other water projects nationwide. When New York needed to increase their water supply, he consulted on the construction of the Quaker Bridge Dam on the Croton River in New York. He also consulted on the dam at Saint Anthony Falls on the Mississippi River.

Their son James fought in the American Civil War as a second lieutenant in 1861. He was wounded in the hand at the Battle of Antietam as a captain, and finished the war in July 1865 as lieutenant colonel.

Francis was elected as a member of the American Philosophical Society in 1865.

== Fire sprinkler system ==
In 1845, Francis developed the first sprinkler systems ever devised in the United States. However, any use of the system would flood the entire structure and its contents. It was not until 1875 that Henry S. Parmelee invented a sprinkler head that activated only one head at a time.

== Turbines ==
Francis became fascinated with and tinkered with turbine designs, after Uriah A. Boyden first demonstrated his Boyden turbine in Lowell. The two engineers worked on improving the turbine. And in 1848, Francis and Boyden successfully improved the turbine with what is now known as the Francis turbine. Francis's turbine eclipsed the Boyden turbine in power by 90%. In 1855, Francis published these findings in the "Lowell Hydraulic Experiments".

== Flood control ==
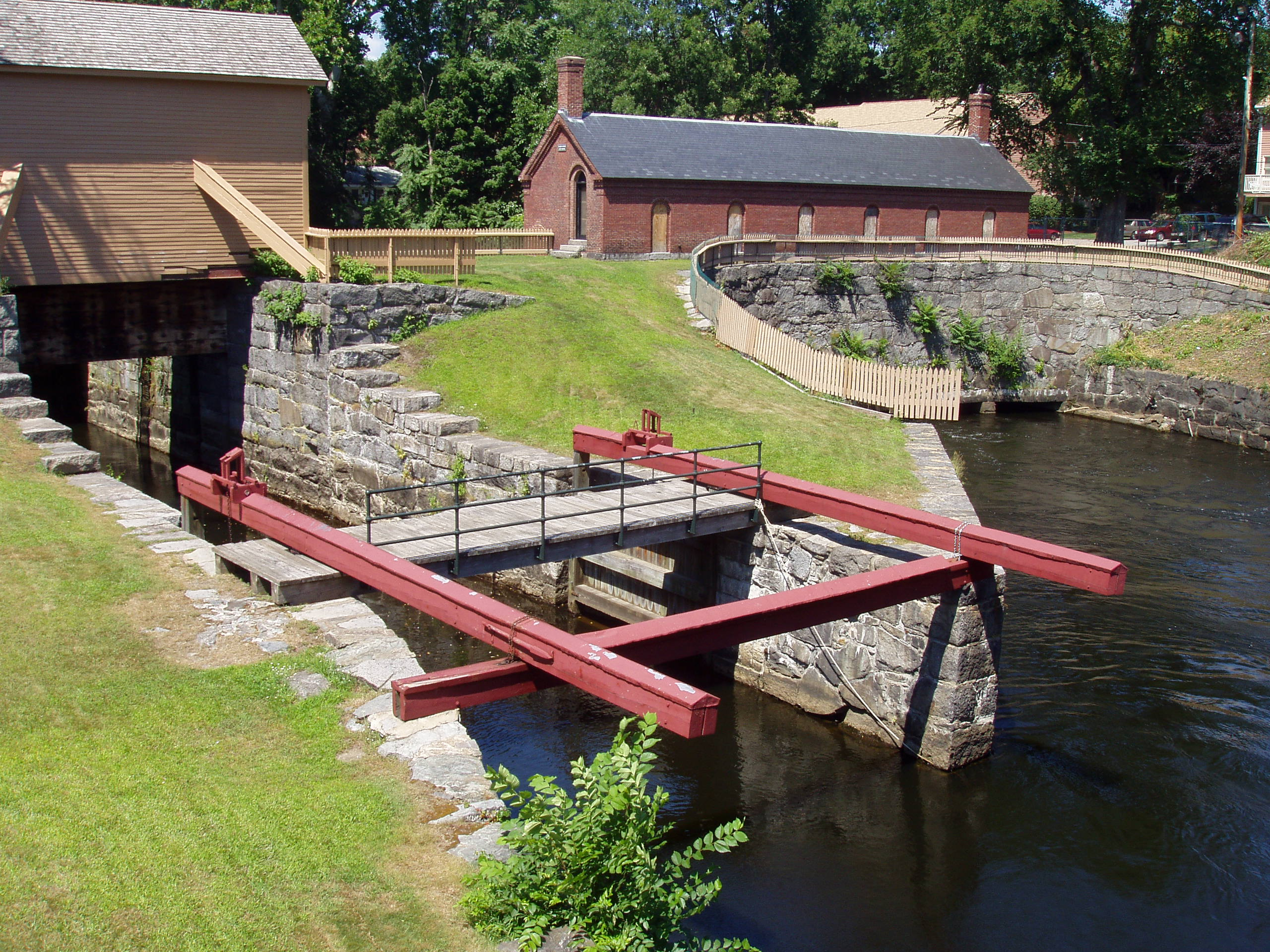
The Great Gate, also known as Francis' Folly

In 1850, Francis ordered the construction of the Great Gate over the Pawtucket Canal to protect the downtown mills from any devastating floods. This project quickly became known as "Francis's Folly", given that no one believed it would work, let alone ever be needed. But less than two years later, in 1852, the gates saved the city of Lowell from the devastating floods of 1852, and again in 1936, 1938, 2006, and 2007 by preventing the Merrimack River from entering the canal system. However, arson damage to the wooden gate in the 1970s, and the difficult method of dropping it (by breaking a large chain link) prompted the city to use a more modern steel-beam bulkhead in its place in 2006. For his efforts in saving the city from great disaster Francis was awarded a massive silver pitcher and a salver by the City of Lowell.

Francis Gate

In 1886, Francis teamed up with two other civil engineers; Eliot C. Clarke and Clemens Herschel to study and publish their findings in the "Prevention of Floods in the Valley of Stony Brook" which laid out a flood prevention system for the city of Boston. The detailed study reviewed the Forest Hills, Hyde Park, Franklin park and Roslindale sections of the city that were subject to flooding.

== Later years ==
Francis stayed active on all levels of involvement in the city of Lowell, and served as an alderman from 1862 to 1864.

In 1865, Francis researched and published his findings on cast iron, and its use in structural columns in "The Strength of Cast-Iron Columns".

In 1874, Francis served on the American Society of Civil Engineers committee to investigate the cause of the breach of the Mill River dam in Massachusetts. Also on the committee were engineers Theodore Ellis and William Worthen. The investigation proceeded quickly and its report was published within a month of the disaster. It concluded that no engineer was responsible for the design and that it was the “work of non-professional persons”. “The remains of the dam indicate defects of workmanship of the grossest character.”

Francis originated scientific methods of testing hydraulic machinery, and was a founding member of the American Society of Civil Engineers and its president in 1880.

=== Francis formula ===
In 1883, Francis completed his calculation standards for water flow rates, now known as the Francis equation or Francis formula, usually used in fluid dynamics in conjunction with calculating weirs. The equation is

$Q = 3.33 h_1^{3 /2} (L-0.2h_1)$

where:

Q is the discharge in cubic feet per second over the weir,

L is the length of the weir in feet, and

h_{1} is the height of the water above the top of the weir.

He remained at the Locks and Canal Company for his entire career, until retirement in 1884 at the age of 69, and remained on as a consultant right up until his death. His son James took over as chief engineer. The rest of his life he spent with his wife Sarah, and their six children in their home on Worthen Street, which was Whistler's old home and now is the Whistler House Museum of Art.

Francis was called to duty in 1889 as a member of an ASCE committee to examine the cause of the Johnstown Flood disaster when the South Fork Dam in Johnstown, Pennsylvania, broke, killing over 2,200 people. Although the report was completed by January 1890, it was immediately suppressed and not released to other ASCE members or the public until mid-1891, two years after the 1889 flood. Francis himself presented the results of the investigation at the ASCE convention in Chattanooga, Tennessee. The other three committee members did not attend. Although Francis’ name headed the report, the de facto chairman of the committee was Max Becker, a railroad engineer based in Pittsburgh with virtually no experience in dams or hydraulic engineering. According to Francis, it was Becker who delayed the release of the report. A detailed discussion of the South Fork investigation, the participating engineers, and the science behind the 1889 flood was published in 2018.

Francis died on September 18, 1892, at the age of 77, and is buried at Lowell Cemetery under a massive pillar of cut granite stones, symbolizing the stones used to make the canals.

== Honors ==
For all his contributions to the world of engineering and his personal generosity, the following are named in his honor:

- James B. Francis College of Engineering at the University of Massachusetts Lowell; Masters, Ph.D and D.Eng. Engineering degrees and research in over seven Engineering programs, including Plastics and Nuclear Engineering.
- Francis Gate, Lowell, Massachusetts
- Francis turbine
- Francis system: an early fire protection sprinkler system
- Francis formula: describes water as it goes over dams. It is used today in fluid mechanics as an equation for the calculation of water flow rate over a rectangular weir in terms of length and head.

== Notable uses of the Francis turbine ==
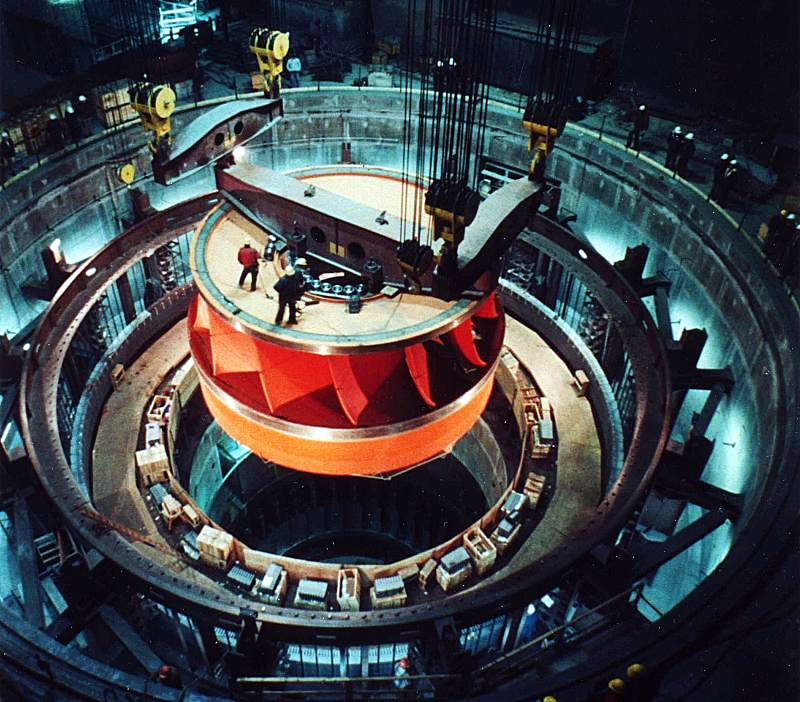
A Francis turbine runner, rated at nearly one million hp (750 MW), being installed at the Grand Coulee Dam, United States

Today, the Francis turbine is the most widely used water turbine in the world, including China's new Three Gorges Dam as the world's second largest hydroelectric power station in the world, with a future installed capacity of 22,500 MW. With the incorporation of the Francis turbine into almost every hydroelectric dam built since 1900, it is responsible for generating almost one fifth of all the world's electricity:

- Älvkarleby Hydroelectric Power Station 1911, in Sweden – early hydroelectric plant in country
- Hoover Dam 1936, Nevada/Arizona – 2,080 MW, world-renowned and once the largest hydroelectric power station in the world
- Grand Coulee Dam 1942, in Washington – 6,809 MW, largest power station in country
- Dez Dam 1963, in Iran – 520 MW, major project in country at time of construction
- Gordon Dam 1978, in Tasmania – 432 MW, tallest dam in country
- Dalešice Hydro Power Plant 1978, in Czech Republic – 480 MW, tallest dam in country
- Jinping-I Dam 2013, in China – 3,600 MW, tallest dam in the world
- Robert-Bourassa generating station 1981, in Canada – 5,616 MW, largest power station in country
- Itaipu Dam 1984, in Brazil/Paraguay –14,000 MW, largest power station in the Americas
- Victoria Dam 1985, in Sri Lanka – 210 MW, tallest dam in country

== See also ==
- 1868 Massachusetts legislature

== Bibliography ==
- Layton, Edwin T. "From Rule of Thumb to Scientific Engineering: James B. Francis and the Invention of the Francis Turbine," NLA Monograph Series. Stony Brook, NY: Research Foundation of the State University of New York, 1992.
- Francis Obituary in Engineering News, Volume XVII, January–June 1887, p. 14
