= Paul Moody (inventor) =

American textile machinery inventor (1779–1831)

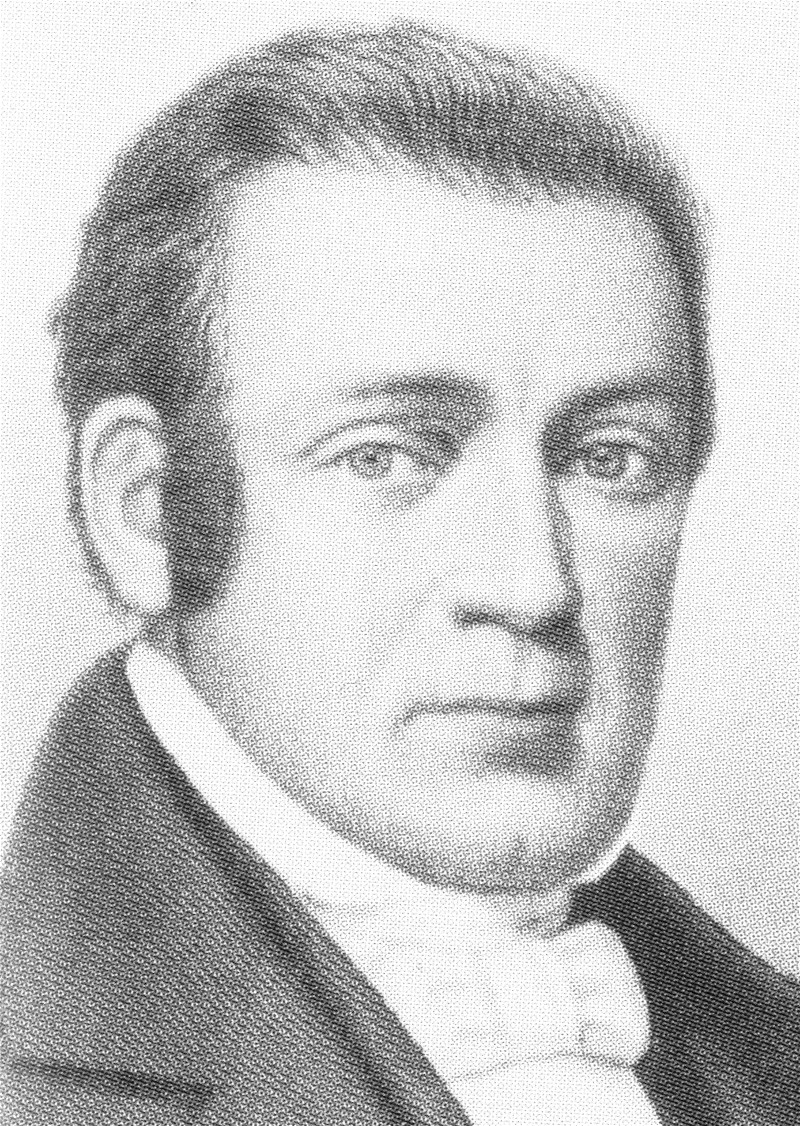
- Born: May 23, 1779; Byfield, Massachusetts
- Died: July 5, 1831 (aged 52); Lowell, Massachusetts
- Occupations: Master mechanic & inventor
- Employer(s): Boston Manufacturing Company, Waltham, MA and later Proprietors of Locks and Canals, Lowell, MA
- Known for: First power loom in U.S.

Paul Moody (May 23, 1779 – July 5, 1831) was a U.S. textile machinery inventor born in Byfield, Massachusetts (Town of Newbury). He is often credited with developing and perfecting the first power loom in America, which launched the first successful integrated cotton mill at Waltham, Massachusetts, in 1814, under the leadership of Francis Cabot Lowell and his associates.

== Early life ==
Paul Moody was born May 24, 1779, at Byfield, Massachusetts, the son of Paul Moody and one of nine children.

Although Moody's academic education was limited, at age sixteen he learned the weaver's craft, and soon became an expert. He later went to work at a nail factory of Jacob Perkins, first in Byfield and later in Amesbury, Massachusetts, when the company moved. In 1812 he worked for Kendrick and Worthen, makers of carding machinery.

On July 13, 1800 (one source says September 1798), he married Susan Morrill of Amesbury. The couple went on to have three sons.

Soon after his marriage, he partnered with Ezra Worthen, Thomas Boardman and Samuel Wigglesworth to form the Amesbury Wool and Cotton Manufacturing Company. It was incorporated on February 16, 1813.

== Waltham ==
In 1814 he arrived at Waltham, Massachusetts, to supervise the setting up of machinery for a new cotton mill under Francis Cabot Lowell and The Boston Associates. Moody created the first power loom that harnessed the city's streams, canals, and rivers. The patent for the loom went to Lowell and his partner.

During his time in Waltham, Moody was awarded other patents. This included one in 1816 for what would eventually become the filling frame (the invited item completed in 1819). He improved upon the double speeder, a device for roping cotton and got the patent on April 3, 1819. On January 17, 1818, he improved upon the soapstone rollers for Horrocks' dressing machine thereby doubling its efficacy.

Moody Street in downtown Waltham is named after Paul Moody.

== Lowell ==
With the success of Waltham, The Boston Associates established an entirely new city in 1821-1825 along the banks of the Merrimack River in East Chelmsford. The city became Lowell, named after Francis Cabott Lowell. There, in 1824, Moody built Lowell Machine Works, to supply the mills with their machines.

In 1824 Moody developed a system of leather belting and pulleys to power machinery, which was almost exclusively used in American mills from then on. The new mode of power transmission was more economical and required less maintenance than the shaft-and-gear system used in the British mills. See: Line shaft

From 1823 to 1825 Moody was the chief engineer for the Locks and Canals Company. During that time he lived in the house now known as the Moody-Whister-Francis House (currently housing the Whistler House Museum of Art).

Moody suddenly died in Lowell in 1831 after a 3-day illness. He was later honored by having streets in Waltham and Lowell, Massachusetts, named after him, although sections of the one in Lowell were later renamed University Avenue and Textile Avenue, as it continues into neighboring Dracut, Massachusetts.

== See also ==
- Francis Cabot Lowell
- Boston Manufacturing Company
- Lowell, Massachusetts
- Waltham, Massachusetts
- Paul Whitin
- David Wilkinson (machinist)
