= Haverhill Historical Society Historic District =

Historic district in Massachusetts, United States

- U.S. National Register of Historic Places
- U.S. Historic district
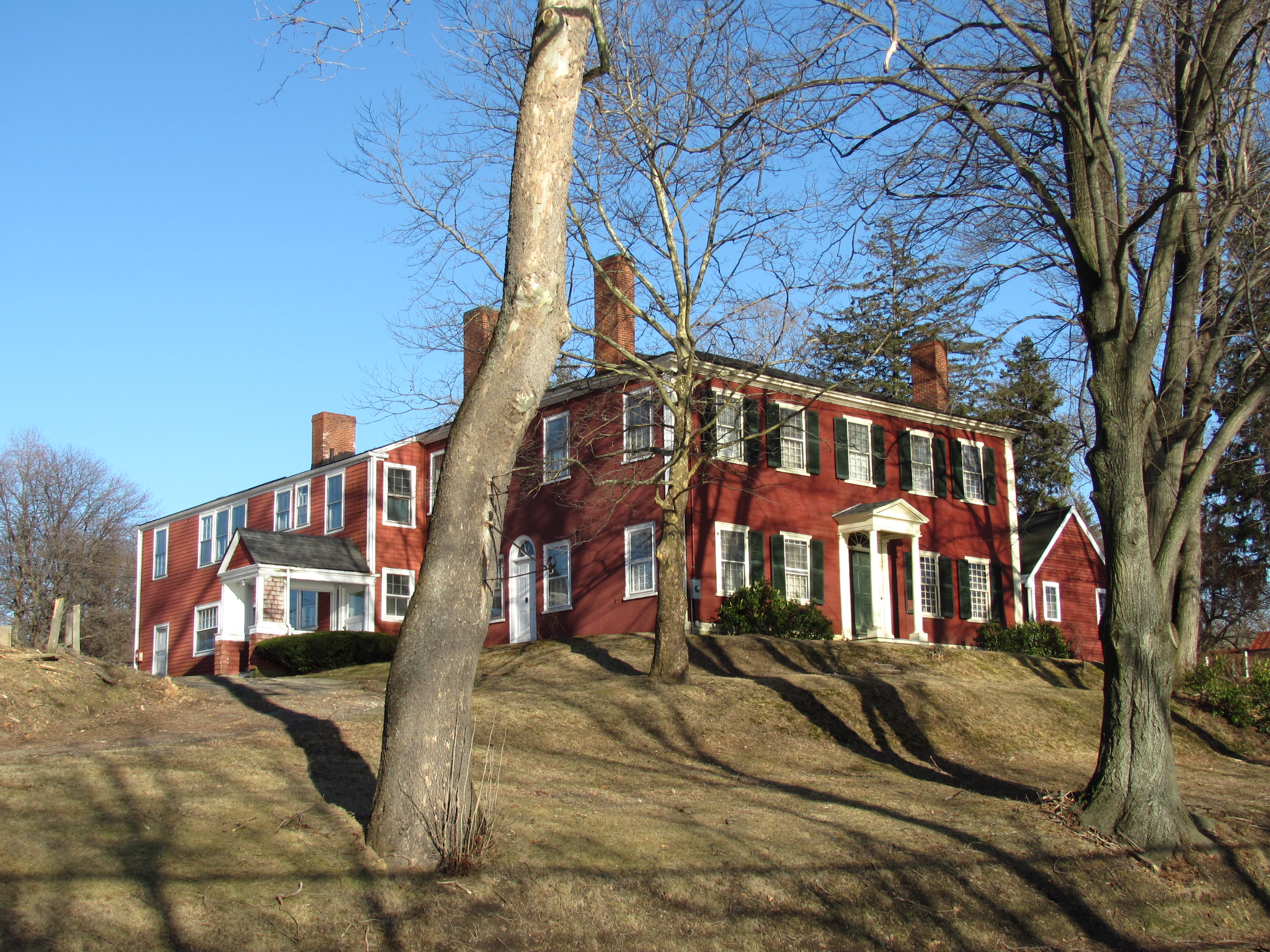
- Haverhill Historical Society

- Location within Massachusetts Location within the United States
- Location: Haverhill, Massachusetts
- Coordinates: 42°46′21″N 71°4′3″W
- Built: 1888
- Architect: Perkins, James H.
- Architectural style: Colonial, Georgian
- NRHP reference No.: 05000560
- Added to NRHP: June 8, 2005

The Haverhill Historical Society Historic District encompasses a collection of historic buildings that have been accumulated by the Haverhill Historical Society at 240 Water Street in Haverhill, Massachusetts. The district, which was listed on the National Register of Historic Places in 2005, has at its core a Federal style farmhouse that was donated (along with the surrounding parcel of land) to the society in 1903. It includes about 1.5 acres (0.61 ha) of land between John Ward Avenue and the Merrimack River, on which stand four buildings; there is also an archeological site, the remains of a late 17th-century homesite, on the property.

The colonial history of the property begins in the 1660s, when it was the home of Elizabeth Ward and Nathaniel Saltonstall, grandson of early Massachusetts settler Richard Saltonstall, and one of the judges of the Salem witch trials. The Saltonstall family held the property in the late 18th century, when a 30-acre (12 ha) parcel with the house on it was taken by mortgage foreclosure by George Watson, brother-in-law to Richard Saltonstall. The property was sold by Watson's heirs to James Duncan, Sr., and it either he or his son Samuel who built the brick Federal style house known as Buttonwoods that now stands on the property. The old Saltonstall house was demolished around this time.

Sometime in the early-to-mid 19th century a second house was built on the property, which was generally occupied by the farmer who managed the land. This house, known as the "Ward" house, was relocated to Eastern Avenue, sometime between 1880 and 1891. The main house and surrounding farmlands remained in the Duncan family until 1888, when heirs began subdividing and selling the farmland. The house remained in Elizabeth Duncan's ownership until she gave it to the Haverhill Historical Society in 1903.

The historical society acquired the property in part to house its growing collection of papers and artifacts, and the eastern two rooms of the house were adapted as a firesafe vault for those materials. The rest of the house was first occupied by the society's curator, who redecorated the house and used it to display his personal collection. In 1906 the "Ward" house was returned to the property, at a site believed to be near its original location. This is house is used by the historical society for interpretive displays.

In the 1920s the society acquired a chapel building on the north side of John Ward Avenue, which it renamed Tenney Hall. This building was to the main parcel in the 1980s, after the society sold the land it was on to Linwood Cemetery. The last main contribution to the property is a historic 1860s ten footer (a small shoe manufacturing building), added to the property in 1957.

== See also ==
- National Register of Historic Places listings in Essex County, Massachusetts
