= Pawtuxet =

Pawtuxet may refer to:

== Places ==
- Pawtuxet River, a river in Rhode Island, U.S.
- Cranston, Rhode Island, a city originally named Pawtuxet
- Pawtuxet Village, a village in the city of Cranston

== Ships ==
- USS Pawtuxet, a gunboat built during the American Civil War
- Pawtuxet-class cutter, a class of revenue cutters built during the American Civil War
  - USRC Pawtuxet, the lead ship of the class

== See also ==
- Pawtuxet Valley (disambiguation)
- Pawtucket (disambiguation)
