= Pawtucket Canal =

Canal in Massachusetts, US

Coordinates: 42°38′39″N 71°18′21″W

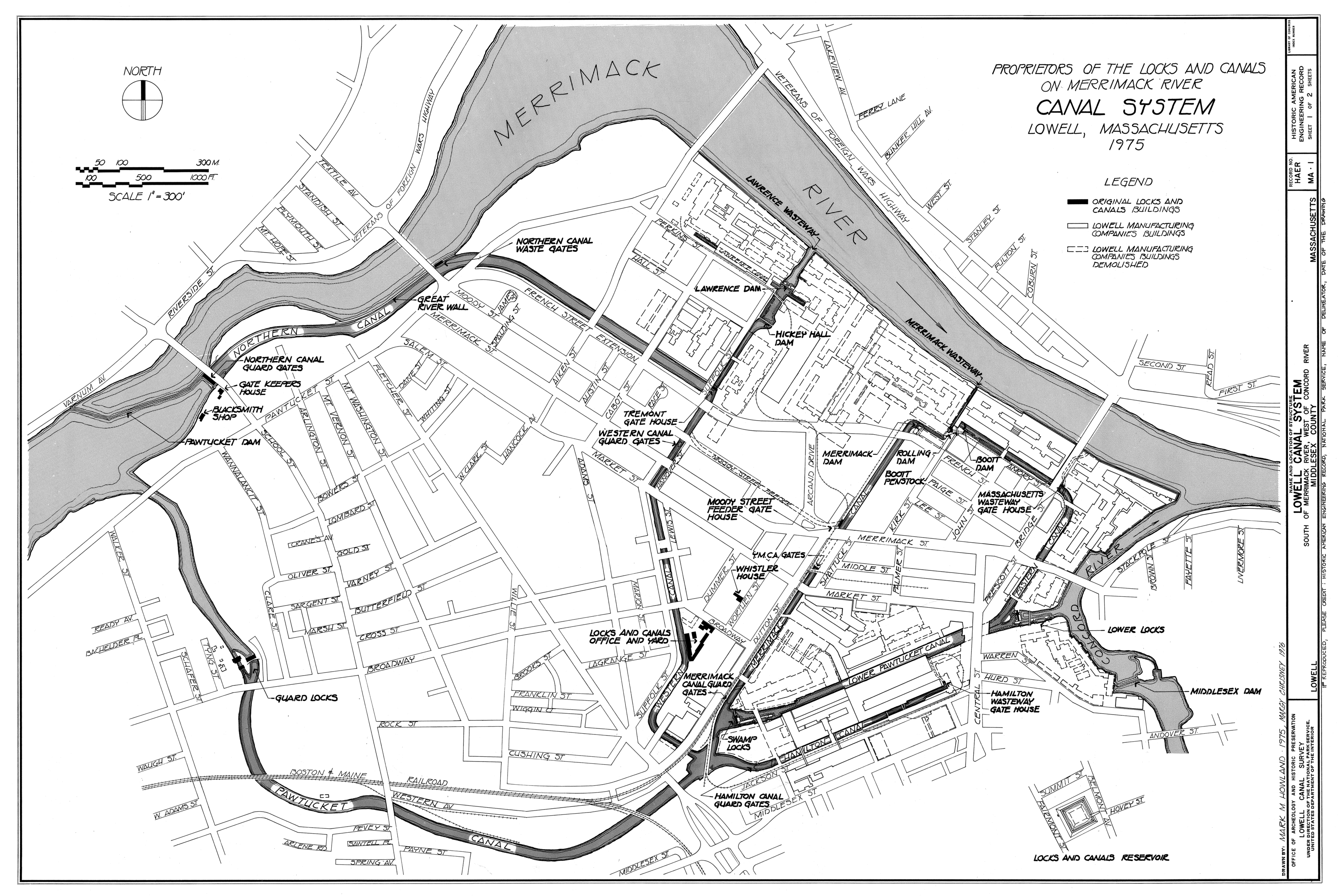
Pawtucket Canal in context

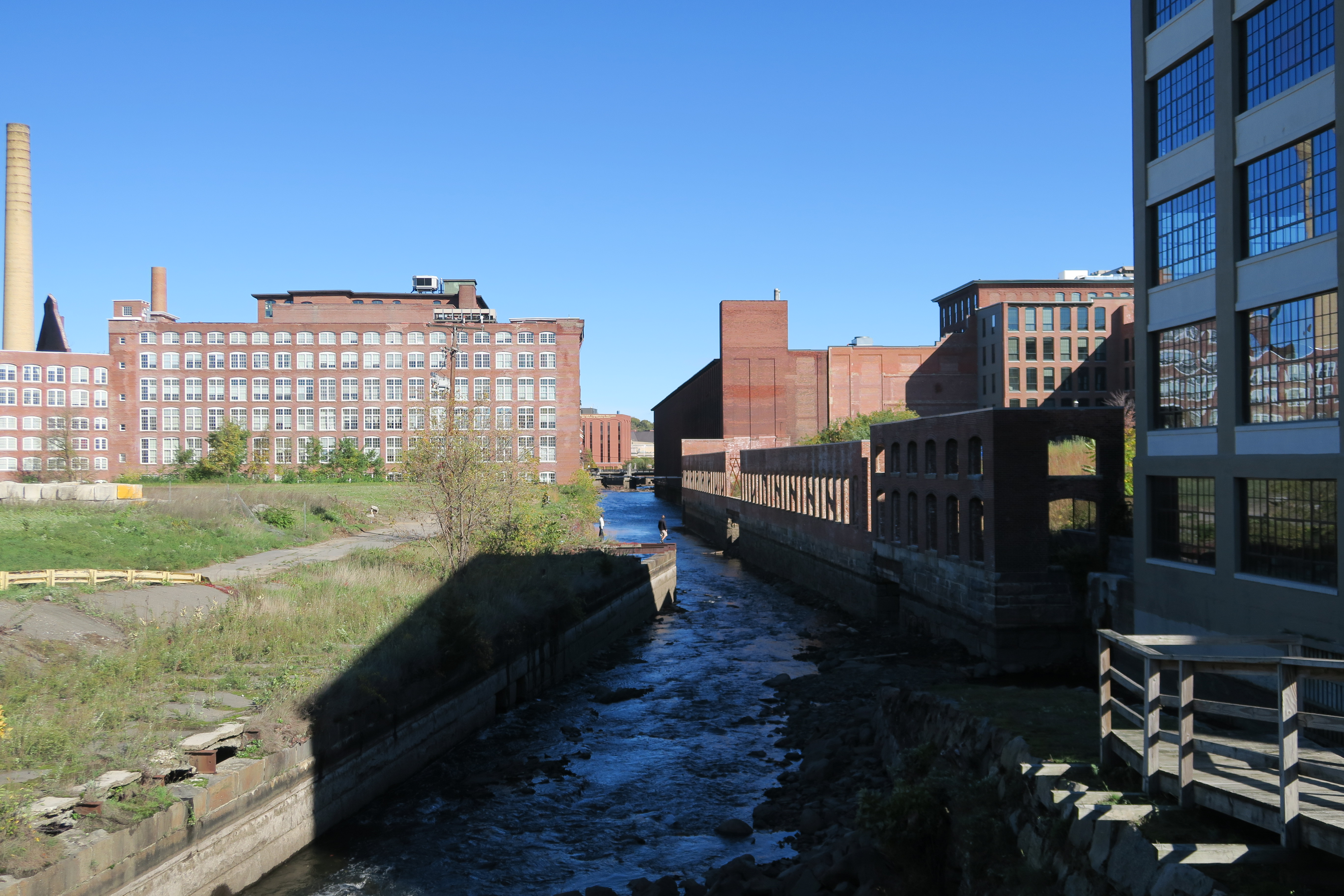
Pawtucket Canal

Completed in 1796, the Pawtucket Canal was originally built as a transportation canal to circumvent the Pawtucket Falls of the Merrimack River in East Chelmsford, Massachusetts. In the early 1820s it became a major component of the Lowell power canal system. with the founding of the textile industry at what became Lowell.

The Pawtucket Falls are a mile long series of falls and rapids over which the Merrimack River drops 32 feet. The falls hampered the shipment of inland goods, mostly lumber, to the mouth of the Merrimack and Newburyport, Massachusetts. Newburyport was then one of the largest shipbuilding centers in New England, and a steady supply of wood from New Hampshire was critical to its industry.

The original canal was built by wealthy Boston merchants who formed a limited liability corporation called the Proprietors of Locks and Canals, one of the first of its kind in the United States. However, within a decade of its construction the Middlesex Canal was completed, connecting the Merrimack directly with Boston, Massachusetts. Bringing goods directly to Boston was more advantageous for merchants, and the Pawtucket Canal fell out of favor for inland transport.

The investors in the Boston Manufacturing Company having successfully built upon Francis Cabot Lowell and Paul Moody's work in building a successfully integrated cotton mill at Waltham, Massachusetts on the Charles River were looking for a site that offered more waterpower and the Pawtucket Falls offered what they needed. In 1821 they bought the Proprietors of Locks and Canals and with it the water rights of the Merrimack River upstream from the Pawtucket Falls. The Pawtucket Canal was deepened to become a power canal, and the first of 5.6 miles of canals in the soon to be named City of Lowell, Massachusetts. The first canal built off the Pawtucket Canal was the Merrimack Canal, which powered the Merrimack Manufacturing Company, thus starting the Lowell experiment, and the first planned industrial city in the United States.

The canal is operated today by Boott Hydro, LLC.

== See also ==
- Lowell Power Canal System and Pawtucket Gatehouse
