= Northern boundary of Massachusetts =

Boundary between Massachusetts and the states to its north

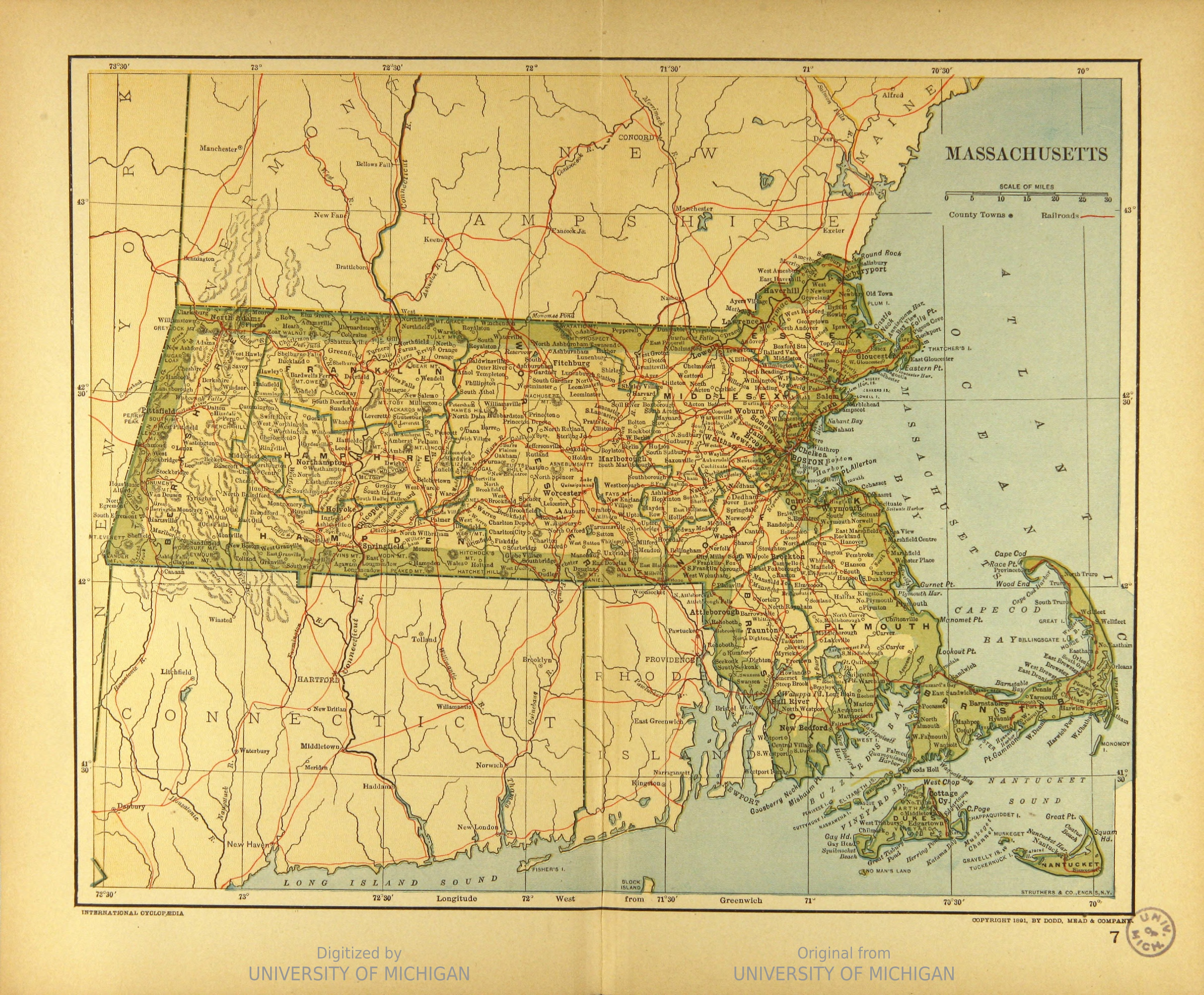
1894 map of Massachusetts

The northern boundary of Massachusetts adjoins two other states: Vermont and New Hampshire. The majority of the boundary is roughly a straight line from the northwest corner of the state (42°44′44.7″N 73°15′54.13″W NAD27) east to a point in Dracut, just north of Lowell. East of that point, the border is a series of line segments about 3 miles (5 km) north of the curving Merrimack River, ending in the Atlantic Ocean.

== History ==
The 1629 charter of the Massachusetts Bay Colony gave the colony the land between the Merrimack River and Charles River. Specifically, the southern border was to be the line of latitude either 3 miles (5 km) south of Massachusetts Bay or 3 miles south of the southernmost bend of the Charles River, whichever was farther south. It turned out that the southernmost bend of the Charles is south of the southern curve of Massachusetts Bay. The line of latitude three miles south of the river's southernmost bend, approximately 42°2′ north, forms the basis of the southern border of Massachusetts to the present day.

The northern border was to be 3 miles north of the northernmost bend of the Merrimack River. Between these lines of latitude the grant extended from the Atlantic to the Pacific. In 1629 the rivers had not been fully explored and the actual borders of the colony were uncertain. However, the Merrimack River turned out to originate farther north than expected, flowing south for most of its course and only turning eastward in its last several miles. In 1652, Massachusetts sent surveyors to discover the northernmost part, and they staked their claim at Endicott Rock at the outlet of Lake Winnipesaukee.

Thus the 1629 grant gave the colony most of what is today New Hampshire and all of the original 1629 grant that formed the basis of colonial New Hampshire. This was the legal basis the Boston government used to incorporate the New Hampshire settlements into Norfolk County, Massachusetts Colony.

A new charter was granted to the Province of Massachusetts Bay in 1691, which merged the colony with the Colony of New Plymouth, as well as present-day Maine and New Brunswick. The northern boundary of what was now the southern piece remained as defined in 1629.

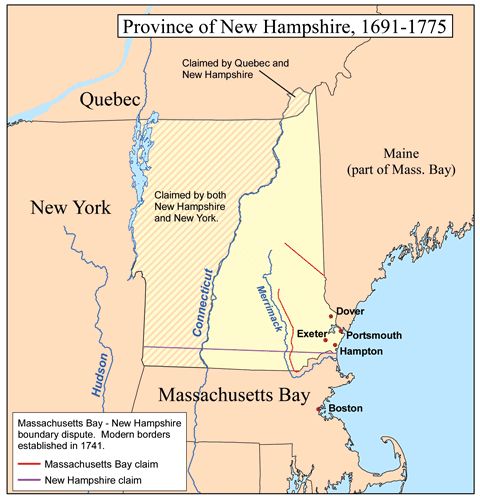
A map showing the rival claims of Massachusetts Bay and New Hampshire

The Province of New Hampshire and Province of Massachusetts Bay had disagreements over their mutual boundaries. With respect to the southern boundary of New Hampshire, the two provinces disagreed on the meaning of "three miles northward of the Merrimack River, or any part thereof". New Hampshire drew a line from three miles north of the mouth of the river, while Massachusetts claimed a line three miles north of the northernmost part of the river, taking its territory far north past what is now Concord, New Hampshire. New Hampshire appealed to King George II, who in 1740 decreed the boundary to run along a curved line three miles from the river between the ocean and a point three miles north of Pawtucket Falls (Lowell), where the river begins to turn north. From there a line was to be drawn due west to meet the western boundary of Massachusetts (fixed in 1773 with the Province of New York). The line actually runs slightly northwest to southeast, so it follows no line of latitude. This gave New Hampshire even more than it had claimed, as Pawtucket Falls was south of the mouth of the Merrimack. At this time, the present northern boundary of Massachusetts was established.

The location where these two surveyed lines met (the straight westward line and the curved line following the Merrimack River) was marked by a pine tree called the "Old Boundary Pine". The tree was marked by George Mitchell, one of the surveyors, on March 21, 1741, to indicate the location where the lines met. The pine tree is long gone, but the point (officially at 42°41′50.25″N 71°19′22.02″W) (Note: The official coordinates may not reflect the actual position of the marker, which is located on private property in the field of a farm off Marsh Road in Dracut.) is today marked by a granite monument known as the Boundary Pine Monument, the current form of which was placed in 1890. Elsewhere, the boundary is made by 50 large granite markers, along with several other markers, including a copper bolt set in granite at the tripoint between Vermont, Massachusetts, and New Hampshire. The Old Boundary Pine was located 57.8 miles (93.0 km) east of this point. The "curved" segments roughly following the course of the Merrimack at a distance 3 miles north of it are not true curves, but rather a series of line segments approximating the curved course of the river. Another granite marker, also placed in 1890, stands on the beach between Salisbury, Massachusetts, and Seabrook, New Hampshire, at 80 feet (24 m) from the high tide line, marking the end of the surveyed border, with the border taken to extend into the Atlantic Ocean to the "limit of State jurisdiction."

New Hampshire claimed all the land west to roughly the present western boundary of Vermont, while New York claimed east to the Connecticut River, Vermont's present eastern boundary; thus both states claimed all of Vermont. A ruling by King George III established the ordinary low-water line on the west bank of the Connecticut River to be the border, but the territory between the Connecticut River and Lake Champlain – which had been sold off by New Hampshire – declared independence in 1777 as the Vermont Republic. New Hampshire gave up its claim to Vermont with a boundary agreement in 1782, and New York gave up its claim to Vermont, contingent upon Vermont's admission to the Union, in 1790 (Vermont was admitted to the Union in 1791).

== See also ==
- Southwick Jog, colloquial name of a notch in Massachusetts' southern border with Connecticut
