= Pawtucket Falls (Massachusetts) =

Waterfall on the Merrimack River at Lowell, Massachusetts

Coordinates: 42°39′02.25″N 71°19′38.42″W

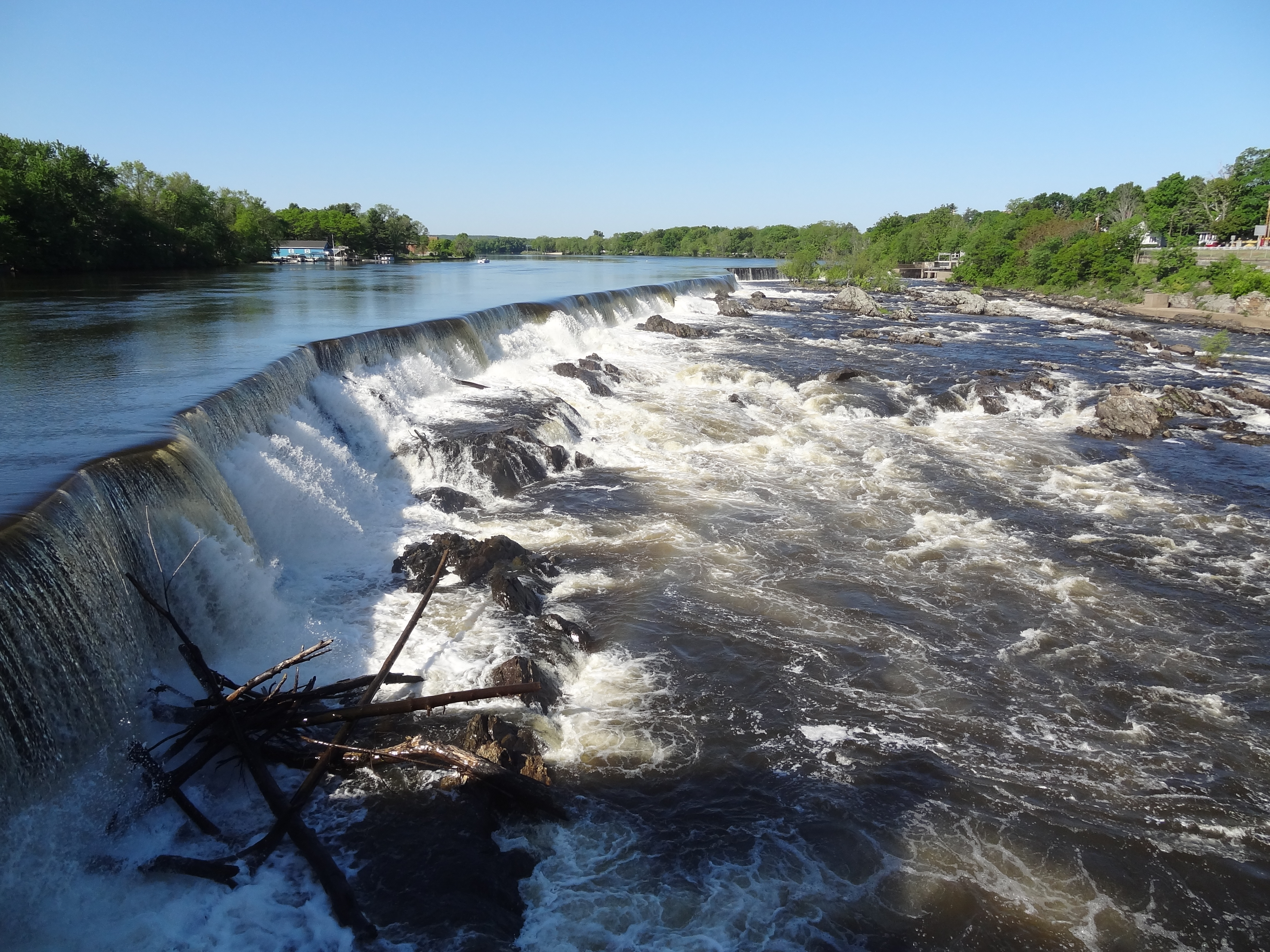
Pawtucket Falls and Pawtucket Dam viewed from Pawtucket Gatehouse in Lowell in May 2012

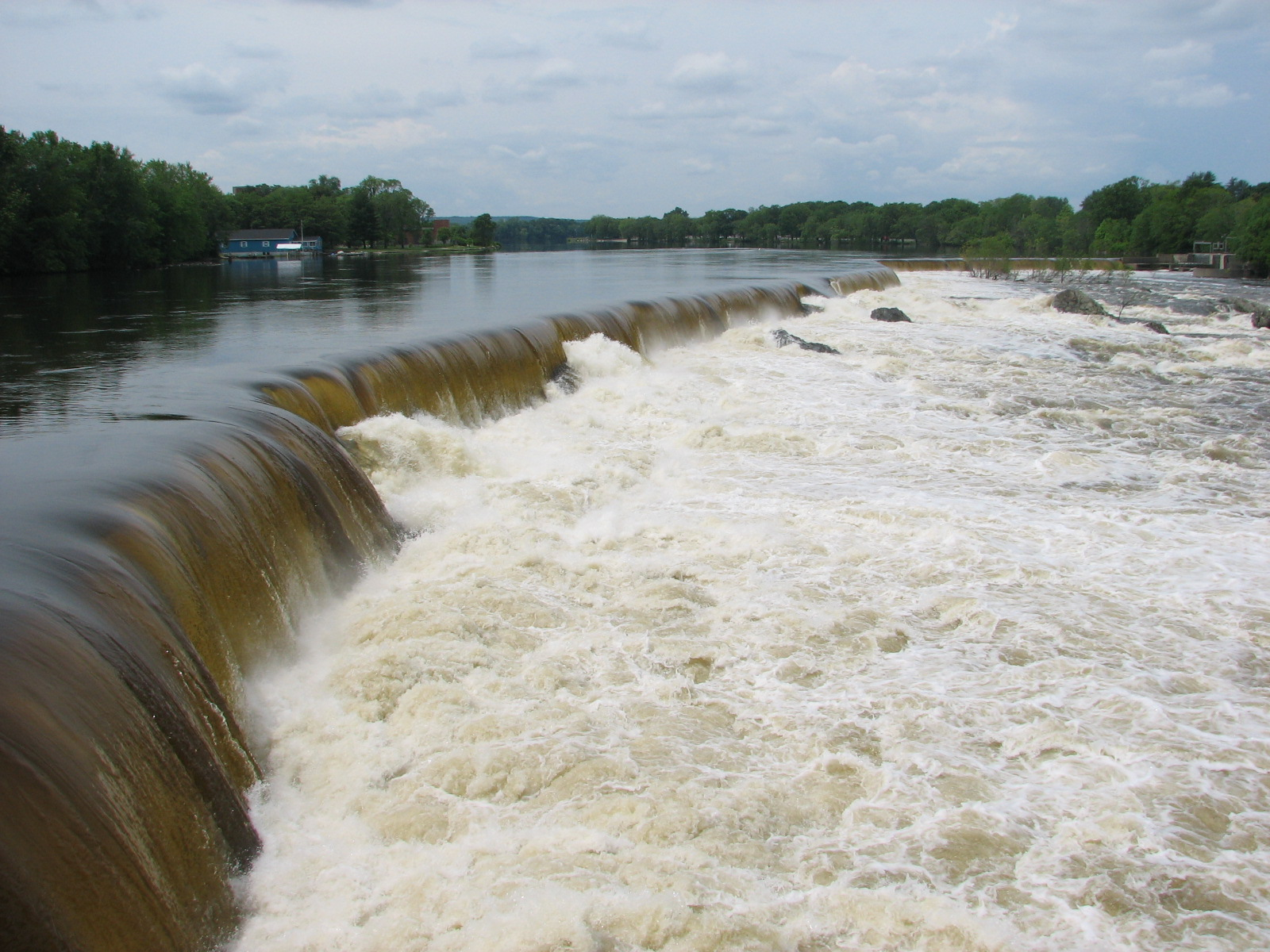
Pawtucket Falls viewed from the same location during the 2006 New England flood

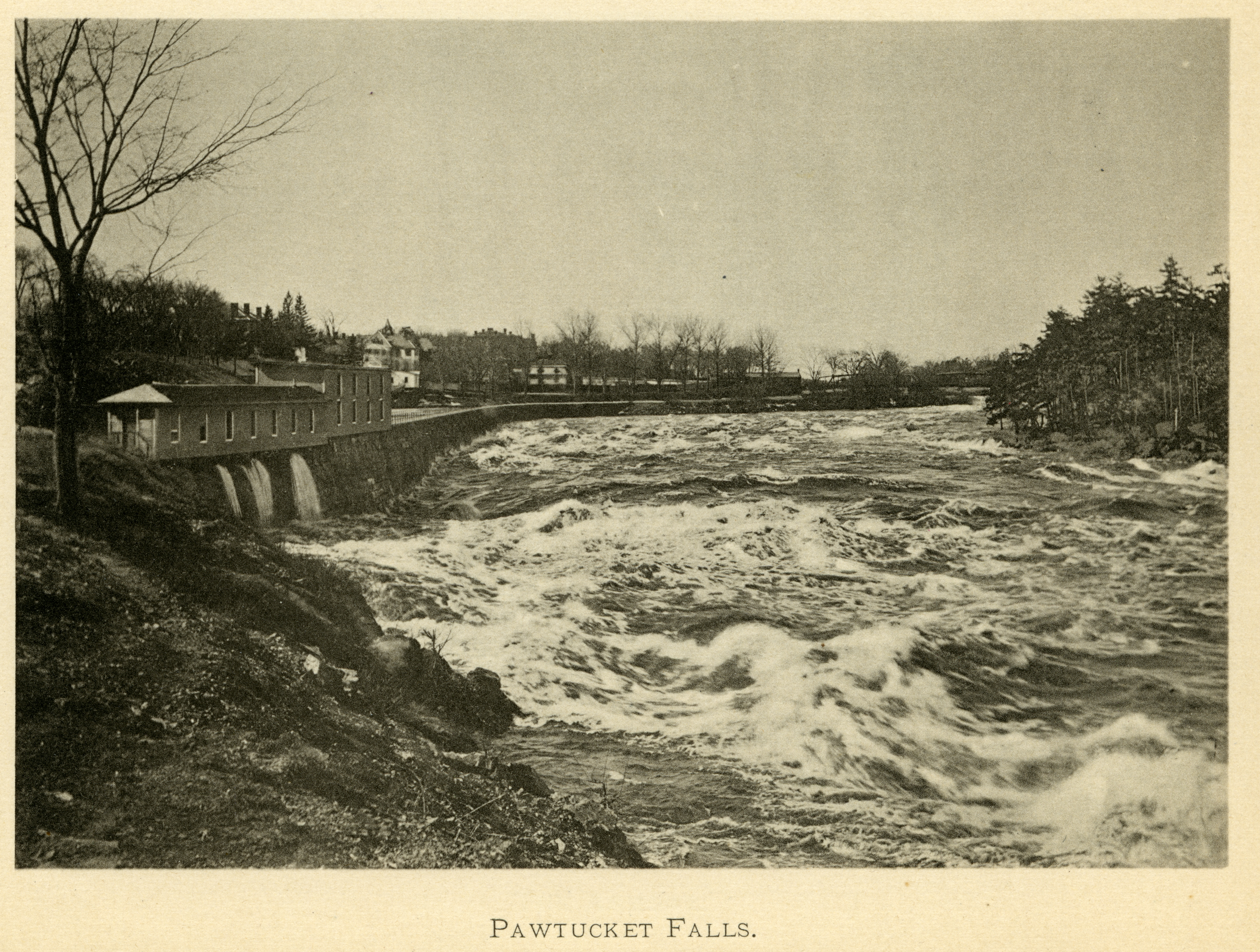
Pawtucket Falls around 1896

Pawtucket Falls is a waterfall on the Merrimack River at Lowell, Massachusetts. The waterfall and rapids below it drop a total of 32 feet in a little under a mile, and was an important fishing ground for the Pennacook Indians in pre-colonial times.

== Etymology ==
Pawtucket is an Algonkian word meaning "at the falls in the river (tidal stream)".

== Use as boundary ==
This location was used as a benchmark for delineating the northern boundary of Massachusetts, which was frequently disputed between the Province of Massachusetts Bay and the Province of New Hampshire. The issue was finally resolved in 1740, when it was decreed that the boundary run along a curved line three miles from the river between the ocean and a point three miles north of Pawtucket Falls, where the river begins to turn north. From there a line was to be drawn due west.

== Canal and dam ==
The existence of these falls as a barrier to travel along the river necessitated the construction of the Pawtucket Canal in the last decade of the 18th century. In the 1820s, the falls, the canal, and the hydropower they provided led to the choosing of this site as America's first planned factory town, Lowell. Over the next 30 years, hydropower from the falls exclusively ran Lowell's numerous textile factories via the city's canal system.

To maximize the head the canals provided, increase volume, and regulate flow, a dam was begun at the top of the falls in the 1820s and was enlarged into the 1840s. The final structure, which exists in the same form today, is a stone dam topped with five foot wooden flash-boards, capable during much of the year of channeling the entire Merrimack into the canal system. The effect is that the Pawtucket Falls are dry. When heavy flow tops the dam, the waterfall created, which is a fraction of the total loss in elevation of 32 feet, is referred to as the Pawtucket Falls.

== See also ==
- List of place names in New England of aboriginal origin
