= Merrimack River =

River in New Hampshire and Massachusetts, US

Merrimack River Merrimac River
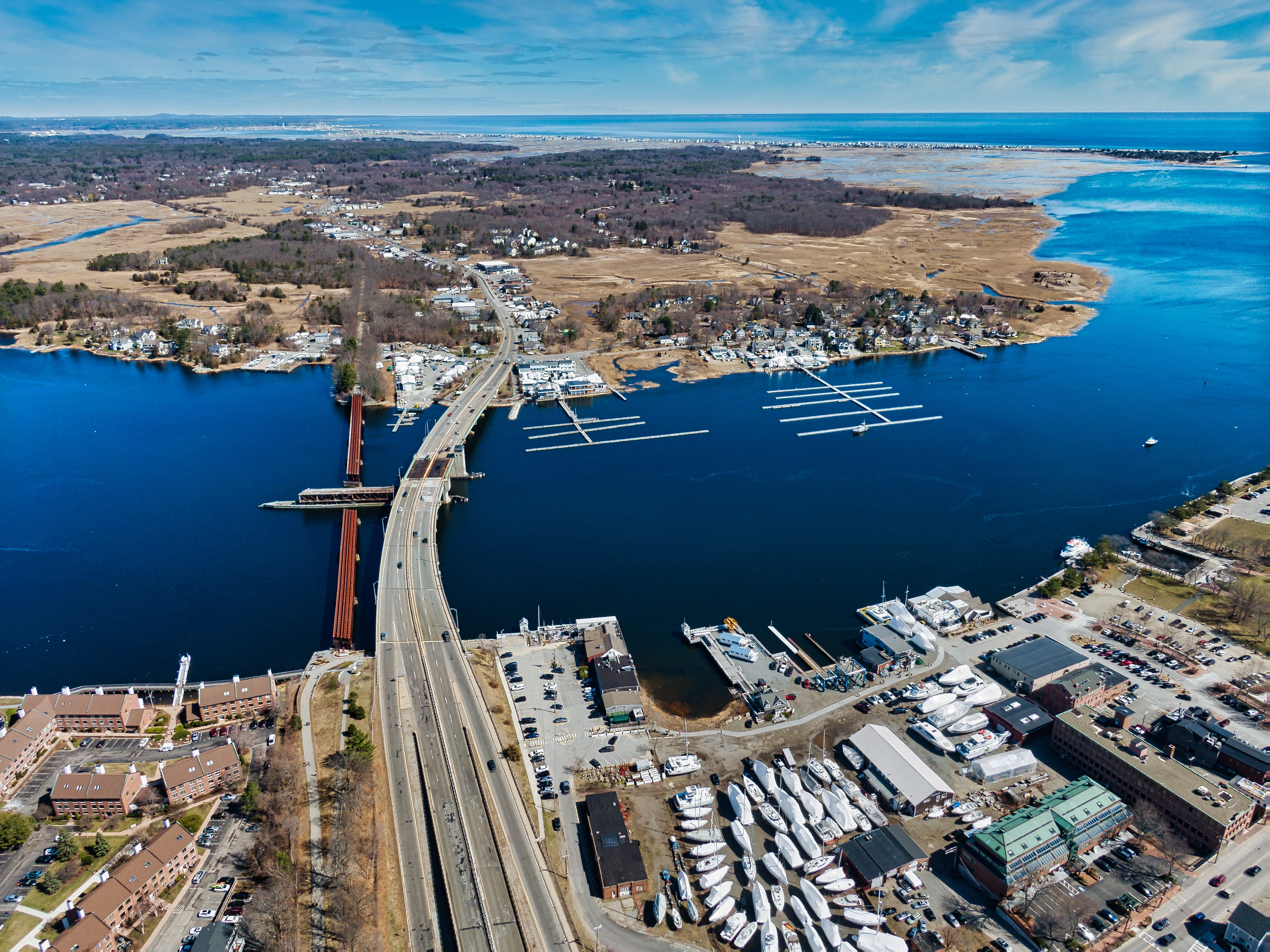
- Mouth of Merrimack River in Newburyport, Massachusetts, in 2021

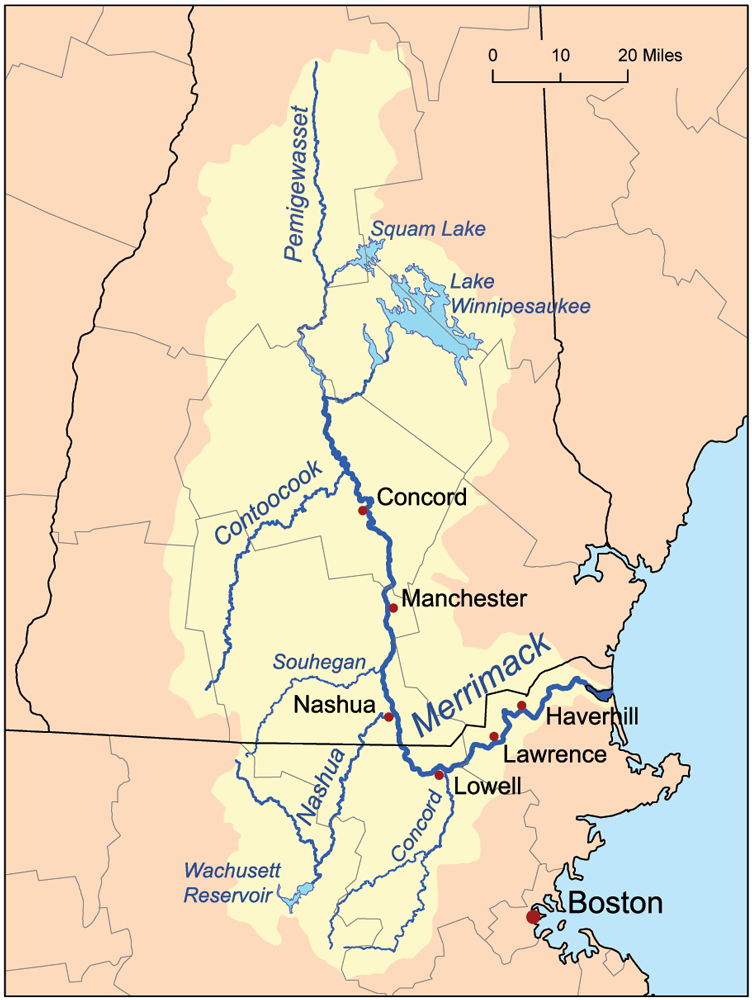
- The Merrimack River and its major tributaries

Location
- Country: United States
- State: New Hampshire; Massachusetts
- Region: New England
- Cities: Concord, NH, Manchester, NH, Nashua, NH, Lowell, MA, Lawrence, MA, Haverhill, MA, Newburyport, MA

Physical characteristics
- Source: Pemigewasset River-Winnipesaukee River juncture
  - location: Franklin, Merrimack County, New Hampshire
  - coordinates: 43°26′11″N 71°38′53″W
  - elevation: 280 ft (85 m)
- Mouth: Gulf of Maine
  - location: Newburyport, Essex County, Massachusetts
  - coordinates: 42°49′10″N 70°48′43″W
  - elevation: 0 ft (0 m)
- Length: 117 mi (188 km)
- Basin size: 5,010 sq mi (13,000 km^{2})
- Discharge
  - location: Newburyport, Massachusetts
  - average: 7,562 cu ft/s (214.1 m^{3}/s)

Basin features
- Tributaries
  - left: Soucook River, Suncook River, Cohas Brook, Beaver Brook, Powwow River
  - right: Contoocook River, Piscataquog River, Souhegan River, Nashua River, Concord River, Shawsheen River

The Merrimack River (or Merrimac River, an occasional earlier spelling) is a 117-mile-long (188 km) river in the northeastern United States. It rises at the confluence of the Pemigewasset and Winnipesaukee rivers in Franklin, New Hampshire, flows southward into Massachusetts, and then flows northeast until it empties into the Gulf of Maine at Newburyport. From Pawtucket Falls in Lowell, Massachusetts, onward, the Massachusetts–New Hampshire border is roughly calculated as the line three miles north of the river.

The Merrimack is an important regional focus in both New Hampshire and Massachusetts. The central-southern part of New Hampshire and most of northeast Massachusetts is known as the Merrimack Valley.

Several U.S. naval ships have been named USS Merrimack and USS Merrimac in honor of this river. The river is also known for the early American literary classic A Week on the Concord and Merrimack Rivers by Henry David Thoreau.

== Etymology and spelling ==
The etymology of the name of the Merrimack River, from which all subsequent uses derive, remains uncertain.

There is some evidence that it is Native American. In 1604 the natives of later New England told Pierre Dugua, Sieur de Monts, who was leading a colony of French language speakers to Acadia (later Nova Scotia), of a beautiful river to the south. The French promptly pronounced its native name as Merremack. In 1605 Samuel de Champlain followed this lead, found the river and renamed it Riviere du Gas.

The French and their name did not remain on the Merrimack. The natives dwelling along the river at the time of European exploration included the Agawam and Naumkeag on the lower reaches, the Pawtucket at Lowell, Massachusetts, the Nashua, Souhegan and Namoskeag around Manchester, New Hampshire, the Pennacook northward from Bow, New Hampshire, and the Winnepisseogee at the source, Lake Winnipesaukee.

According to Joseph B. Walker, relying on Chandler Eastman Potter's The History of Manchester (1856), Merremack contains the elements merruh ("strong") and auke ("place"—a recognizable locative ending), and means "the place of strong current,- a term not inappropriate, when we consider ... the river's rapids ...." Potter was an authority on Native American affairs in colonial New England. By contrast, in A Week on the Concord and Merrimack Rivers, Henry David Thoreau implies that "its name signifies the Sturgeon River."

Walker goes on to cite spellings of "Merimacke", "Merimack" and "Merrimacke" in "the colonial records of Massachusetts", as well as the "Merrimake" and "Merrymake" of a 1721 land grant at Penacook, New Hampshire. William Wood's New England's Prospect of 1634 calls the river the "Merrimacke" and locates it eight miles beyond Agowamme (Ipswich, Massachusetts). It hosts, he says, "Sturgeon, Sammon and Basse, and divers other kinds of fish."

Merrimac, Massachusetts, settled in 1638 and originally part of Amesbury, Massachusetts, was called West Amesbury until 1876, at which time it adopted its current name and spelling. Merrimack, New Hampshire, was incorporated in 1746, spelling its name "Marrymac" in the record of its first town meeting. It was referred to as "Merrimac" into the early 19th century: in the 1810 decennial census, it was spelled "Merrimac", but in the 1820 census and afterward, "Merrimack".

In 1914, US Congressman John Jacob Rogers (MA) petitioned that the official spelling be "Merrimack".

== History ==
Prior to glaciation, the Merrimack continued its southward course far beyond the present day New Hampshire-Massachusetts border to enter the Gulf of Maine near Boston. Upon the glacier's retreat around 14,000 years ago, debris deposited north of Boston filled the lower Merrimack Valley, redirecting the river into its current northeast bend at Lowell. The Neville archaeological site is located along the river's banks in New Hampshire.

On the Merrimack River's banks are a number of cities built to take advantage of water power in the 19th century, when textile mills dominated the New England economy: Concord, Manchester, and Nashua in New Hampshire, and Lowell, Lawrence, and Haverhill in Massachusetts. At the mouth of the river is the small city of Newburyport. Prior to the construction of the Middlesex Canal, Newburyport was an important shipbuilding city, in a location to receive New Hampshire timber that had been floated downriver.

== Geography ==
The Merrimack River watershed covers 5,010 square miles (12,980 km^{2}) in southern New Hampshire and northeastern Massachusetts. It is the fourth largest river basin in New England.

The river begins in the city of Franklin, New Hampshire, at the confluence of the Pemigewasset and Winnipesaukee rivers. From there, the river flows south through Concord, Manchester, and Nashua, entering Massachusetts at the town of Tyngsborough, where it turns northeast and winds past or through Chelmsford, Lowell, Dracut, Tewksbury, Andover, Methuen, Lawrence, North Andover, Haverhill, Groveland, West Newbury, Merrimac, and Amesbury, to its mouth at the Gulf of Maine between the city of Newburyport and the town of Salisbury.

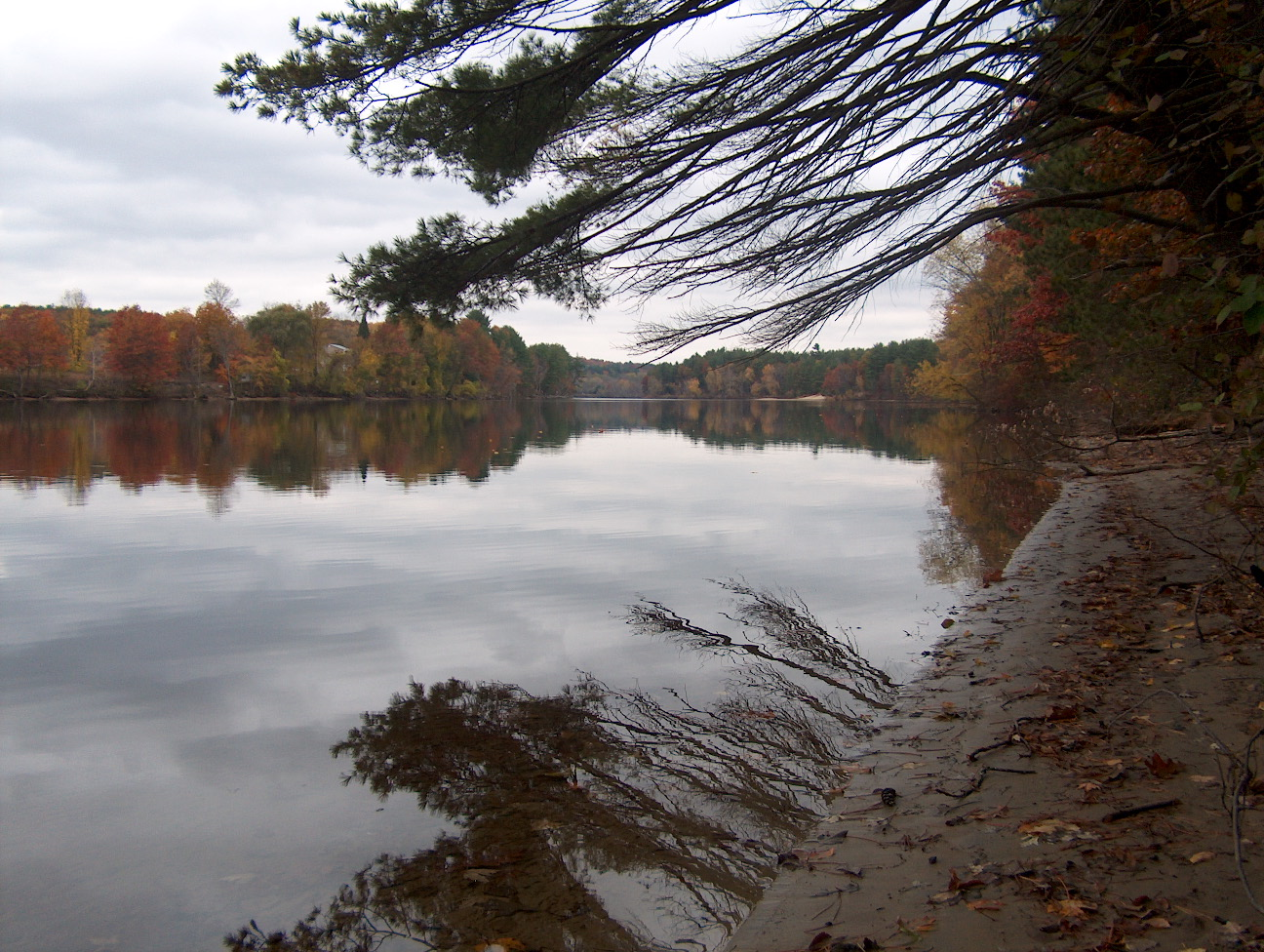
The Merrimack River in Pembroke, New Hampshire

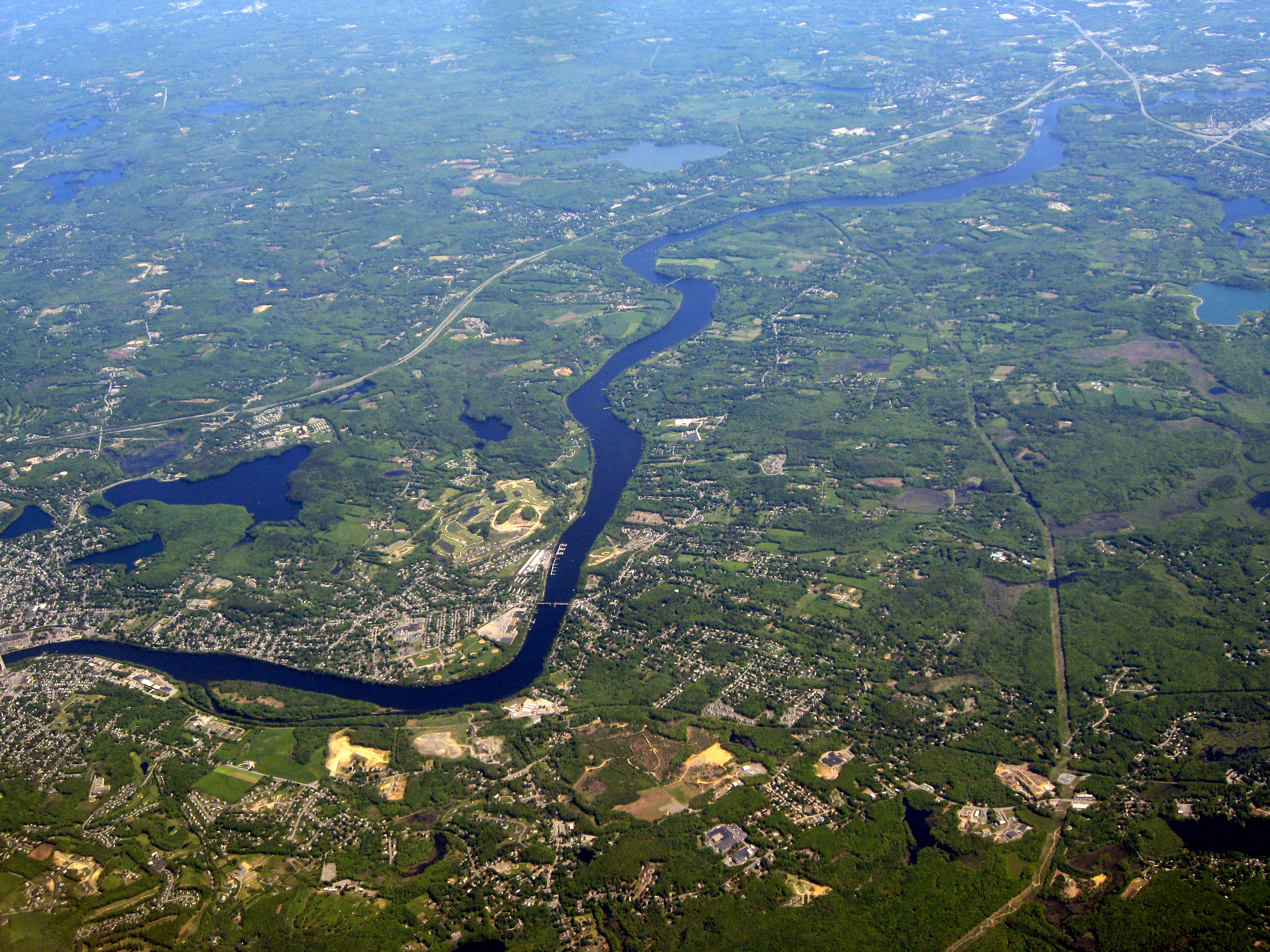
The Merrimack as it flows from Haverhill to its mouth in Newburyport, Massachusetts

=== Major sub-basins ===
In addition to the Merrimack River mainstem, there are dozens of sub-basins in New Hampshire and Massachusetts making up the watershed. The U.S. Geological Survey categorizes them into six fourth-level sub-basins using hydrological codes with the prefix 0107.

New Hampshire

- Pemigewasset River (HUC 01070001)
- Winnipesaukee River (HUC 01070002)
- Contoocook River (HUC 01070003)

New Hampshire and Massachusetts

- Nashua River (HUC 01070004)
- Merrimack River (HUC 01070006; smaller tributaries)

Massachusetts

- Sudbury/Assabet/Concord rivers (sometimes referred to simply as the Concord Sub-basin or the "SuAsCo" sub-basin) (HUC 01070005)

=== Other major rivers ===
The following are some of the other significant rivers found within the six major sub-basins in the watershed, listed moving downstream along the Merrimack:

- Soucook River
- Suncook River
- Piscataquog River (not to be confused with the Piscataqua River, part of the Piscataqua-Salmon Falls watershed)
- Cohas Brook
- Souhegan River
- Salmon Brook
- Stony Brook
- Beaver Brook
- Spicket River
- Shawsheen River
- Little River
- Powwow River

== River pollution and restoration ==
=== History of pollution ===
Since 1951, the Merrimack River has seen many alterations and pollutants. It was dammed and canalled, as well as used as a dumping spot for industrial waste. The Merrimack was essential for textile mill complexes, which used the river for discharge from their factories. Citizens recall that the river had unusual colors, smells, and vegetation as a result of the pollution from textile mills and other human-related waste. In the 1960s, the Merrimack River was one of the ten most polluted waterways in the United States due to years of unmediated dumping of raw sewage, paper and textile mill discharge, and tannery sludge. In 1966, environmentalist Donald Eaton Carr described the Merrimack as being "...haunted with the oldest and most hopeless pollution of any in the country."

Phthalates, a group of chemicals used in the manufacture of plastics and detrimental to human bodily systems, were identified in high concentrations within the river in 1973. A 1976 study of the chemical dynamics of the Merrimack River found that at that time, the biggest pollution source was road salt. Although the river underwent significant restoration efforts from the 1970s onwards, a 1997 study found that the river continued to suffer from the long-term effects of pollution. The study identified that the river had elevated bacteria counts, low dissolved oxygen, and high nutrient levels. A few years later, a 2002 statewide water assessment stated that elevated counts of E. coli and fecal coliform contributed to the river's largest cause of water quality violations. By the 2000s, the largest pollution concern was combined sewer overflow. Wildlife has been impacted through the contamination of shellfishing beds as well as habitat contamination, and aquatic life has been affected due to excess lead, zinc, and other metals in the river. In addition, human recreational activities such as swimming and boating have been restricted in certain areas of the river due to high contamination levels.

=== Restoration efforts ===
The Federal Clean Water Act of 1972 led to significant improvement for the Merrimack River. The law required sewage to be treated before being discharged into waterways. Federal funding allowed officials to create the river's infrastructure, specifically funding for wastewater treatment plants (U.S. Army Corps of Engineers 2006). Following these changes in the river's infrastructure, there was a noticeable change in wildlife and aquatic life. Birds, fish, and other animals returned to inhabit the river, with citizens noting specifically seeing much more American shad, striped bass, trout, and Atlantic salmon. The involvement of local volunteers in monitoring and maintaining the river has provided effective restoration efforts over the years.

=== Current concerns ===
The Merrimack River remains one of the most endangered rivers in the United States, as named by the American Rivers nonprofit in 2016. Current concerns include stormwater runoff, urban stormwater, high levels of bacteria, combined sewage runoff, phosphorus creating harmful algal blooms, reduced oxygen levels, illicit sewage discharges, and litter. Combined sewer overflows (CSO) are the largest contributors to waste discharge into the Merrimack River. Currently, there are six sanitary sewer systems from which untreated sewage flows directly into the Merrimack River due to infrastructure issues within the sewage system. Recent research has identified mercury contamination as a significant threat to fish and aquatic life in the Merrimack River. This research analyzes how biological mercury hotspots and watershed transport of mercury might contribute to the exposure of aquatic life to chemical pollution within the Merrimack River. Additionally, the use of road salt in the winter has remained a major pollutant since the 1970s, and chloride contamination in the Merrimack River continues to impact aquatic life.

United States politicians from New Hampshire and Massachusetts are calling for the United States Environmental Protection Agency (EPA) to reassess a permit allowing landfill water to be dumped into the Merrimack River. Politicians are also seeking increased federal funding to update water infrastructure for the Merrimack River, as the river's current sewer infrastructure has resulted in the dumping of over 100,000 gallons of untreated water into the river.

== Navigation ==
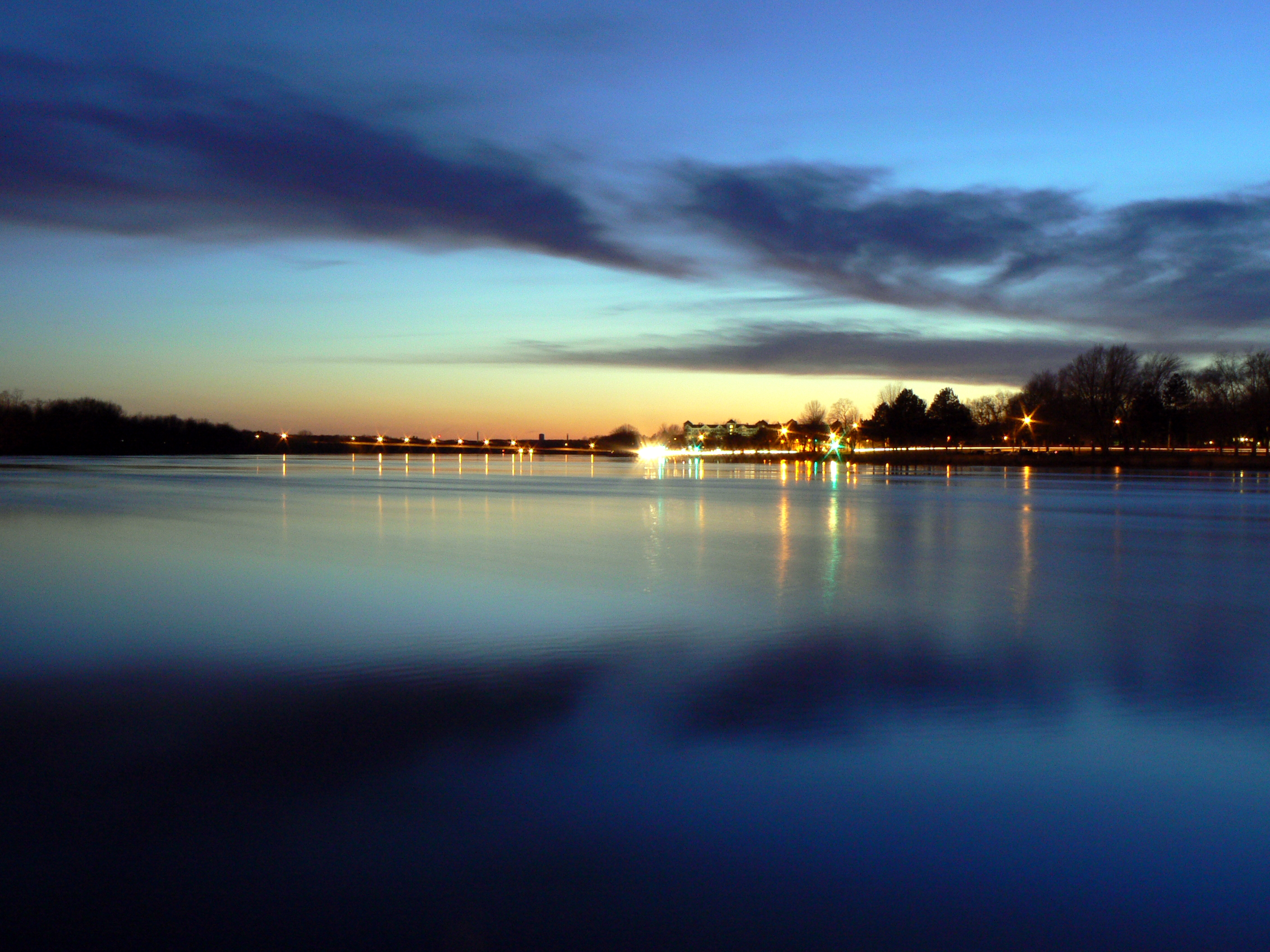
Merrimack River in Lowell, Mass.

The Merrimack is listed as one of the Navigable Waters of the United States, subject to Section 10, Rivers and Harbors Act Jurisdiction.

== May 2006 flooding ==
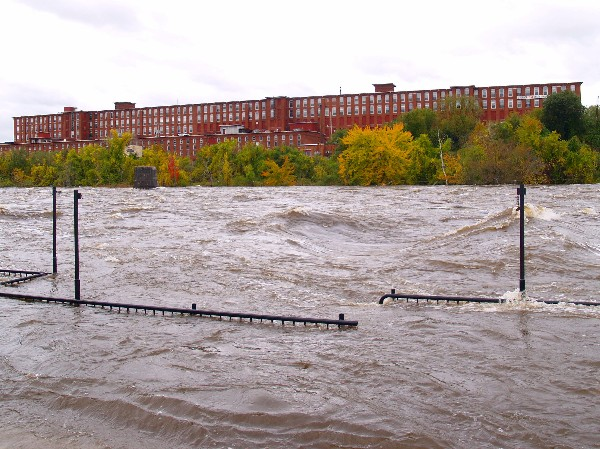
Merrimack River in flood, October 2005, Manchester, New Hampshire

While the Merrimack River is prone to minor flooding, on May 15, 2006, rainfall raised the river more than 8 feet (2.4 m) above flood stage, forcing evacuations, damaging property, and breaking the main sewage pipeline in the city of Haverhill, Massachusetts, dumping 35×10^{6} US gallons (1.3×10^{8} L) of raw sewage waste into the river per day. Reports of total rainfall vary, but most areas appear to have received around a foot of rain with some areas receiving as much as 17 inches (43 cm).

According to The Boston Globe, around 1,500 people evacuated their homes to escape the flood.

This flood also prompted the Massachusetts city of Lowell to install a modern (albeit temporary) flood control gate comprising square steel beams at the site of the historic Francis Gate, a 19th and 20th-century wooden flood gate. When lowered, the Francis gate seals the city's canal system off from its source on the Merrimack. The Great Gate, as it is also called, was built in 1850 under the direction of James B. Francis. Considered unnecessary when it was first constructed, "Francis' Folly" first saved the city in 1852 and subsequently in 1936.

== Other flooding events ==
The most significant flood in the recorded history of the Merrimack was in March 1936, when a double flood of rain and melting snow and ice swelled the Merrimack at Lowell to 68.4 feet (20.8 m), 10 feet (3 m) higher than the 2006 flood. Part of the Jack Kerouac book Doctor Sax is set during this event.

In addition to the 1936 flood, the 1852 flood, and the Mother's Day Flood of 2006, the New England Hurricane of 1938 and floods in October 1996 and April 2007 round out the river's most serious flood events, measured at Lowell. The Francis Gate had been left in place after being dropped in 1936, so it prevented flooding in 1938 as well. In 2007, the steel beam system was again assembled in place.

== In media ==
The song "Merrimack River" and its instrumental reprise are featured on the 2009 album Amanda Leigh by Nashua, New Hampshire, native Mandy Moore.

Anya Seton's historical novel Avalon includes a section depicting the fictional Pre-Columbian arrival of 9th century Irish and English travelers at the Merrimack River and their interactions with local Native Americans.

== See also ==
- List of rivers of Massachusetts
- List of rivers of New Hampshire
- List of crossings of the Merrimack River
- List of most-polluted rivers

== General and cited references ==
- Currier, John James (1902). History of Newbury, Mass. 1635–1902. Boston: Damrell & Upham. Downloadable from Google Books.
- Johnson, Linck C. (1986). Thoreau's Complex Weave: The Writing of A Week on the Concord and Merrimack Rivers with the Text of the First Draft. Charlottesville, VA: University of Virginia Press.
- Meade, J. W. (1869). The Merrimack River: its source and its tributaries. Boston: B. B. Russell.
- Walker, Joseph B. (1863) [June 13, 1860 (the date the speech was delivered)]. "The Valley of the Merrimack". Collections of the New Hampshire Historical Society. New Hampshire Historical Society: 414–432 – via Google Books.
