= Varnum =

Varnum may refer to:

- Varnum v. Brien (763 N.W.2d 862), 1 2009 Iowa Supreme Court case
- Varnum Building, a historic commercial and residential building in Lowell, Massachusetts
- Varnum School, a historic former school building in Lowell, Massachusetts
- Varnum's Continentals, a nickname for the 1st Rhode Island Regiment in the American Revolutionary War
- Camp Varnum, a Rhode Island Army National Guard training facility

== People with the surname ==
- Betty Lou Varnum (1931–2021), children's television program personality
- Charles Albert Varnum (1849–1936), US Army officer and Custer's Chief of Scouts at the time of Little Big Horn
- James Mitchell Varnum (1748–1789), Continental Army officer and US statesman
- James M. Varnum (born 1848) (1848–1907), American lawyer and politician
- John Varnum (1778–1836), US Representative from Massachusetts
- Joseph Bradley Varnum (c. 1750–1821), US Representative from Massachusetts and Speaker of the House
