= National Register of Historic Places listings in Lowell, Massachusetts =

These are the National Registered Historic Places listings in Lowell, Massachusetts.

This National Park Service list is complete through NPS recent listings posted October 30, 2026.

== Current listings ==
	Name on the Register	Image	Date listed	Location	Description
1	Allen House	Allen House	August 11, 1982 (#82001992)	2 Solomont Way; 42°38′33″N 71°20′12″W	Listed at 57 Rolfe Street, now on the campus of University of Massachusetts Lowell.
2	Andover Street Historic District	Andover Street Historic District	June 2, 2000 (#00000568)	245–834 Andover St., 569, 579 E. Merrimack St. 42°38′37″N 71°17′11″W	
3	Belvidere Hill Historic District	Belvidere Hill Historic District	May 26, 1995 (#95000656)	Fairview, Talbot and Summit Sts. and parts of Nesmith, Mansur and Fairmount Sts. and Belmont Ave. 42°38′17″N 71°17′34″W	
4	Jerathmell Bowers House	Jerathmell Bowers House	January 28, 1994 (#93001588)	150 Wood St. 42°37′50″N 71°21′19″W	
5	Jonathan Bowers House	Jonathan Bowers House	June 18, 1976 (#76000253)	58 Wannalancit St. 42°38′46″N 71°19′42″W	
6	Brown-Maynard House	Brown-Maynard House	July 2, 1986 (#86001460)	84 Tenth St. 42°39′16″N 71°17′58″W	
7	Butler School	Butler School	February 2, 1995 (#94001634)	812 Gorham St. 42°37′50″N 71°18′30″W	
8	Chelmsford Glass Works' Long House	Chelmsford Glass Works' Long House	January 25, 1973 (#73000302)	139–141 Baldwin St. 42°38′02″N 71°20′57″W	
9	City Hall Historic District	City Hall Historic District	April 21, 1975 (#75000156)	Roughly area between Broadway and French Sts., Colburn St. and both sides of Kirk St. 42°38′46″N 71°18′48″W	Boundary increase (added 1988-10-13): 165 Market St.
10	Colburn School	Colburn School	May 19, 1995 (#94001592)	136 Lawrence St. 42°38′23″N 71°18′16″W	
11	Flagg-Coburn House	Flagg-Coburn House	May 15, 1986 (#86001052)	722 E. Merrimack St. 42°38′45″N 71°17′14″W	
12	Warren Fox Building	Warren Fox Building	October 12, 1989 (#89001609)	190–196 Middlesex St. 42°38′26″N 71°18′45″W	
13	Grace Universalist Church	Grace Universalist Church	March 11, 2011 (#11000069)	44 Princeton Boulevard; 42°38′07″N 71°19′58″W	Now known as the St. George Hellenic Orthodox Church
14	Holy Trinity Greek Orthodox Church	Holy Trinity Greek Orthodox Church	April 13, 1977 (#77000181)	62 Lewis St. 42°38′44″N 71°19′02″W	
15	Howe Building	Howe Building	October 12, 1989 (#89001608)	208 Middlesex St. 42°38′26″N 71°18′46″W	
16	Hoyt-Shedd Estate	Hoyt-Shedd Estate	May 17, 1984 (#84002697)	386–396 Andover St., 569–579 E. Merrimack St. 42°38′35″N 71°17′28″W	
17	Lowell Cemetery	Lowell Cemetery	May 20, 1998 (#98000543)	984 Lawrence St. 42°37′40″N 71°17′42″W	
18	Lowell Historic Preservation District	Lowell Historic Preservation District	January 19, 2001 (#03000170)	Lowell area around Merrimack River; 42°38′48″N 71°18′29″W	
19	Lowell Locks and Canals Historic District	Lowell Locks and Canals Historic District	August 13, 1976 (#76001972)	Between Middlesex St. and the Merrimack River; 42°38′44″N 71°19′12″W	National Historic Landmark
20	Lowell National Historical Park	Lowell National Historical Park	June 5, 1978 (#78003149)	Merrimack St. 42°38′47″N 71°19′11″W	
21	Lowell Post Office	Lowell Post Office	October 4, 2002 (#02001084)	89 Appleton St. 42°38′28″N 71°18′34″W	
22	Merrimack-Middle Street Historic District	Merrimack-Middle Street Historic District	January 16, 1979 (#13000404)	Roughly bounded by Merrimack, Middle, Prescott, Central and Market Streets; 42°38′42″N 71°18′31″W	Market St. represents a boundary increase #88000971
23	Middlesex Canal	Middlesex Canal	August 21, 1972 (#72000117)	Running SE between towns of Lowell and Woburn; 42°38′16″N 71°21′02″W	
24	Middlesex Canal Historic and Archaeological District	Middlesex Canal Historic and Archaeological District	November 19, 2009 (#09000936)	Numerous locations along the historic route of the Middlesex Canal; 42°38′48″N 71°18′29″W	Extends into Suffolk County and other parts of Middlesex County; encompasses Middlesex Canal and other listings.
25	Monarch Diner	Monarch Diner	November 28, 2003 (#03001207)	246 Appleton St. 42°38′21″N 71°18′50″W	Now operating as The Owl Diner.
26	Musketaquid Mills	Musketaquid Mills	December 9, 1999 (#99001480)	131 Davidson St. 42°38′37″N 71°18′16″W	
27	Pawtucket Congregational Church	Pawtucket Congregational Church	March 21, 2007 (#07000167)	15 Mammoth Rd. 42°39′02″N 71°19′56″W	
28	Rogers Fort Hill Park Historic District	Rogers Fort Hill Park Historic District	May 27, 1999 (#99000635)	Roughly bounded by High St., Mansur St., Concord R., and Lowell Cemetery; 42°38′06″N 71°17′47″W	
29	St. George Antiochian Orthodox Church	St. George Antiochian Orthodox Church	June 10, 2008 (#08000507)	61 Bowers St. 42°38′53″N 71°19′26″W	
30	St. Joseph's Convent and School	St. Joseph's Convent and School	July 19, 2002 (#02000789)	517 Moody St. 42°39′02″N 71°19′20″W	
31	Saint Joseph's Roman Catholic College for Boys	Saint Joseph's Roman Catholic College for Boys	February 24, 2010 (#10000041)	760 Merrimack St. 42°38′56″N 71°19′14″W	
32	St. Patrick's Church	St. Patrick's Church	January 3, 1985 (#85000027)	284 Suffolk St. 42°38′43″N 71°19′03″W	
33	South Common Historic District	South Common Historic District	August 10, 1982 (#82001993)	Roughly bounded by Summer, Gorham, Thorndike, and Highland Sts. 42°38′13″N 71°18′41″W	
34	Tyler Park Historic District	Tyler Park Historic District	August 17, 1989 (#89001056)	Roughly bounded by Princeton, Foster, and Pine Sts. 42°37′52″N 71°20′27″W	
35	US Post Office	US Post Office	March 10, 1986 (#86000373)	50 Kearny Sq. 42°38′43″N 71°18′24″W	Renamed the F. Bradford Morse Federal Building in 2006.
36	Varnum Building	Varnum Building	December 19, 1988 (#88002752)	401–405 Bridge St. 42°39′01″N 71°18′14″W	Demolished after fire
37	Varnum School	Varnum School	January 24, 1995 (#94001591)	103 Sixth St. 42°39′04″N 71°17′58″W	
38	Wamesit Canal-Whipple Mill Industrial Complex	Wamesit Canal-Whipple Mill Industrial Complex	August 11, 1982 (#82001994)	576 Lawrence St. 42°37′57″N 71°18′03″W	
39	Wannalancit Street Historic District	Wannalancit Street Historic District	May 20, 1998 (#98000541)	14–71 Wannalancit St., and 390, 406 Pawtucket St. 42°38′48″N 71°19′46″W	
40	Washington Square Historic District	Washington Square Historic District	August 11, 1982 (#82001995)	Roughly bounded by Merrimack, Park, Andover, Oak, Harrison, and Willow Sts. 42°38′35″N 71°17′54″W	Boundary increase (added 1999-11-12): 140-160 Andover St.
41	Wilder Street Historic District	Wilder Street Historic District	May 26, 1995 (#95000662)	284–360 Wilder St. 42°38′11″N 71°19′56″W	
42	Worcester House	Worcester House	December 22, 1983 (#83004091)	658 Andover St. 42°38′42″N 71°16′50″W	
