= Hoyt-Shedd Estate =

Historic house in Massachusetts, United States

- U.S. National Register of Historic Places
- U.S. Historic district – Contributing property
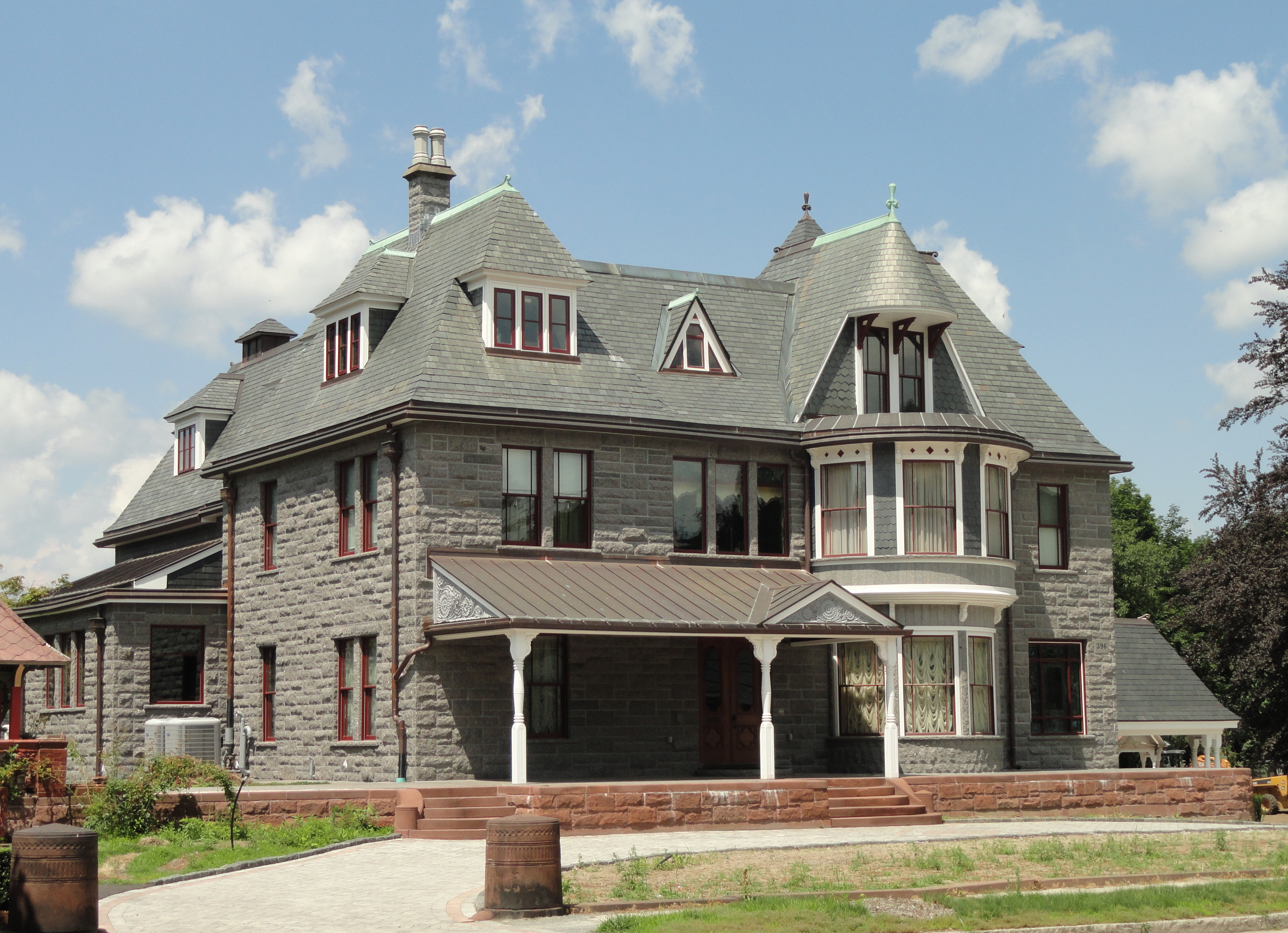

- Location within Massachusetts Location within the United States
- Location: Lowell, Massachusetts
- Coordinates: 42°38′35″N 71°17′28″W
- Built: 1873
- Architect: Wilkins, Mr.; Stickney, Frederick
- Architectural style: Stick/Eastlake, Queen Anne
- Part of: Andover Street Historic District (ID00000568)
- NRHP reference No.: 84002697

Significant dates
- Added to NRHP: May 17, 1984
- Designated CP: June 2, 2000

The Hoyt-Shedd Estate is a historic residential estate at 386-396 Andover Street and 569-579 East Merrimack Street in Lowell, Massachusetts. The houses at 386 and 396 Andover Street are large Stick style mansions, built about the same time (c. 1873) and designed by the same architect. They were built for the friends and business partners E. W. Hoyt and F. B. Shedd. Together they made a fortune selling perfume and related products.

The estate was listed on the National Register of Historic Places on May 17, 1984, and was included in the Andover Street Historic District on June 2, 2000.

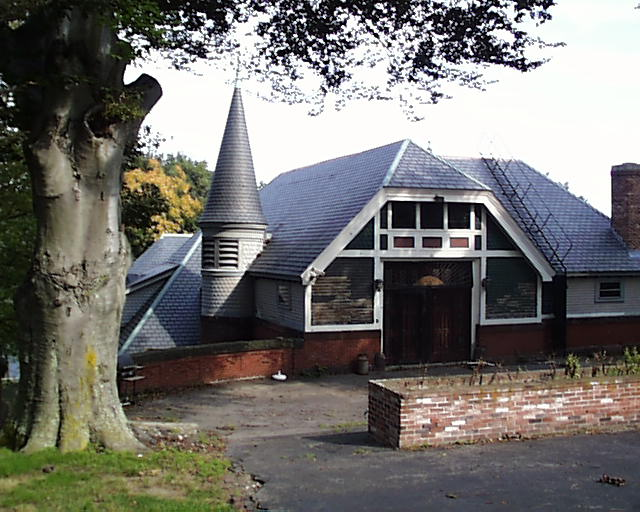
Carriage House

== See also ==
- National Register of Historic Places listings in Lowell, Massachusetts
