= Hells Angels MC criminal allegations and incidents in Massachusetts =

Numerous police and international intelligence agencies classify the Hells Angels Motorcycle Club (HAMC) as a motorcycle gang and contend that members carry out widespread violent crimes, including drug dealing, trafficking in stolen goods, gunrunning, extortion, and prostitution rings. Members of the organization have continuously asserted that they are only a group of motorcycle enthusiasts who have joined to ride motorcycles together, to organize social events such as group road trips, fundraisers, parties, and motorcycle rallies, and that any crimes are the responsibility of the individuals who carried them out and not the club as a whole.

In Massachusetts, the HAMC has established chapters in Lowell, Lawrence, Lynn, Haverhill, Salem, Cape Cod (headquartered in Buzzards Bay) and Berkshire County (headquartered in Lee). The "Bad Company" chapter in Lowell, founded in 1966, was the club's first branch on the East Coast. The Hells Angels are the most significant motorcycle gang involved in drug trafficking in Massachusetts, and have also collaborated with the Boston faction of the Patriarca crime family in loansharking and narcotics distribution.

== Violent incidents ==
Hells Angels members were among a group of twenty people – fifteen men and five women – charged with various offenses after a battle with police on Lowell's Andover Street on December 14, 1969. The violence erupted when police officers arrived at a house party in response to complaints from neighbors and were threatened with a rifle. Around forty-five officers, including reinforcements from neighboring towns, were required to arrest the group. Five police officers were injured and a patrol wagon was damaged in the incident. Several rifles and a sawed-off shotgun were seized along with clubs and daggers, as well as barbiturates. Three Hells Angels – Alan J. "Big Al" Hogan, Philip W. Jones and Michael Maguire – were charged with assault with intent to murder.

Hells Angels member Alan Hogan, along with Gilbert LaRocque and Joseph F. Quartarone Jr., abducted Linda Condon outside a bar in Beverly in the early hours of August 9, 1975 and forcefully took the keys to her Newburyport apartment, which she shared with her husband Theodore Condon, a member or former member of the Hells Angels. While LaRocque held Linda Condon captive in the back seat of Quartarone's Cadillac, Hogan and Quartarone – a police officer in the city of Beverly – entered the apartment and beat Theodore Condon with clubs, inflicting severe injuries including fractures of the femur and of both tibiae, a severe contusion of the left side of his face, a through-and-through laceration of his left ear, a perforated left ear-drum, and a fractured skull. Linda Condon was then taken to a motel room in Peabody, where she escaped through a window and called for the police after LaRocque fell asleep. The trio were convicted of kidnapping, assault and battery by means of a dangerous weapon, and mayhem. The Massachusetts Appeals Court reversed all convictions because, in its view, the trial judge improperly forbade cross-examination of the Condons designed to show bias because criminal charges stemming from a 1971 drug indictment were pending against them at the time.

In September 1984, Salem Hells Angels chapter member Billy Leary and another motorcyclist were arrested by the Massachusetts State Police (MSP) for operating under the influence after leaving a nightclub in Revere. Leary was subsequently charged with three counts of assault and battery, and three counts of making threats after an incident occurred when officers attempted to strip search him at a Peabody police station. He was ultimately acquitted.

Two Hells Angels were accused of raping a woman at the Lynn chapter's clubhouse during the 1997 funeral of former chapter president Alan Hogan.

Salem Hells Angels members James Costin and Thomas M. Duda were charged with assault and battery following an attack on off-duty police lieutenant Vernon "Skip" Coleman at a Lynn bar on November 24, 2004. Coleman suffered a severe facial laceration after being punched and kicked. Costin pleaded guilty on May 18, 2005, and was sentenced to two-to-four years in prison, with fifteen months to be served and the rest suspended for five years of probation.

During a traffic stop on Route 107 on January 6, 2005, Hells Angels member Christopher Ranieri fled into a marsh after state trooper Daniel Crespi observed what he believed to be a gun under his jacket. Police eventually coaxed Ranieri out of the swamp and arrested him on several charges. He was given a ninety-day suspended sentence for assault on a police officer.

Eric Franco, the sergeant-at-arms of the Lynn Hells Angels chapter, was found to be in possession of a firearm and ammunition on May 3, 2011, when police were called to the apartment he shared with his girlfriend and her child after receiving a report that Franco had assaulted his girlfriend. Franco's criminal record in Massachusetts includes three convictions for assault and battery by a dangerous weapon, as well as convictions for indecent assault and battery, failure to register as a sex offender, breaking and entering at night with intent to commit a felony, and conspiracy to violate the controlled substances act. Franco was also convicted in Arkansas for battery in the second degree in a case in which he and five other Hells Angels assaulted and stabbed four Bandidos members. He was convicted in September 2012 of possessing a firearm and ammunition after receiving a felony conviction, and was sentenced to twenty-one years in prison on March 12, 2013.

Two members of the Hells Angels' Salem chapter – Marc Eliason and Sean Barr, the chapter president – were arrested on charges of kidnapping, mayhem and extortion on March 13, 2013, along with Nikolis Avelis and Brian Weymouth – two members of the Byfield chapter of the Red Devils, a Hells Angels support club. Two others were also later apprehended. The charges related to the assault of a former Red Devils member, who was forced to resign from the club after failing to assault an expelled member of the Salem Hells Angels as ordered by superiors. The victim was lured to the Red Devils' Byfield clubhouse on October 15, 2012, where he was interrogated before being knocked unconscious and having his hand broken with a ball-peen hammer, causing permanent injury. His motorcycle was also stolen. After being threatened by Red Devils members into delivering the title to the stolen motorcycle, he went into hiding and eventually contacted the FBI. Barr, Eliason, Weymouth and another Hells Angel, Robert DeFronzo, pleaded guilty to conspiring to commit violent crimes, maiming, assault with a dangerous weapon, assault resulting serious bodily injury and racketeering in February 2015. Barr and Eliason were each sentenced to eight years' imprisonment, while DeFronzo and Weymouth were sentenced to four years'.

== Gang wars ==
=== Lucifer's Henchmen ===
David A. Urban, a Hells Angels member from Buffalo, New York, was fatally shot in the heart after an unidentified gunman fired four rounds from a pistol into a bar in Lynn on April 23, 1974. Mark W. Veherbon, a Menlo Park, California Hells Angel, was also wounded after being shot three times in the stomach and leg, while two other club members escaped unharmed. Although the murder has been unsolved, Lynn police have speculated that the shooting stemmed from a conflict with a fledgling rival club, Lucifer's Henchmen MC, and an incident at a local café on April 7, in which the son of the café proprietor, Thomas Abernathy Jr., was allegedly stabbed by two Hells Angels. The HAMC reportedly emerged victorious in the feud, seizing the "colors" of ten or eleven Lucifer's Henchmen members. Another three rival bikers fled the state. One of the Hells Angels charged with the non-fatal stabbing, "Whiskey" George Hartman Jr., was murdered in Florida on April 30 before he could face trial. A man sentenced in the café assault was released from prison days before Abernathy Jr. was seriously injured by a nail bomb left on the porch of his home on March 24, 1975. He was blinded, and lost his left arm and his right hand in the explosion.

=== Devils Desciples ===
During the early hours of September 20, 1981, James Rich was stabbed numerous times in the legs after being attacked outside a bar in Revere Beach by four unidentified men – believed to be Hells Angels members – who accused him of being a member of the Devils Desciples MC. The following evening, three friends of Rich – Robert L. Cobb, Arthur A. Corbett and Andrew J. Millyan – went to the bar seeking revenge on any Hells Angels present. Millyan shot bar patron Dana Hill in the head with a shotgun. Hill – who was not a member of any motorcycle gang, but had the appearance of a biker – died three days later. After discarding the murder weapon in a body of water, Cobb, Corbett and Millyan were arrested by police and indicted on first-degree murder charges on the theory of joint enterprise. On May 19, 1982, Corbett and Millyan were convicted of murder in the first degree; Cobb was convicted of murder in the second degree. The trio were sentenced to life in prison.

Two Hells Angels members were stabbed in Revere on November 8, 1991, allegedly by Devils Desciples members.

=== Trampers ===
After founding chapters in Lynn, Lowell and Pittsfield, the Hells Angels established a presence in Boston, beginning a feud with the Trampers motorcycle gang of East Boston. By 1986, the Trampers' membership had dwindled from 60 to around 15 or 20, allowing the Hells Angels to take over drug-dealing, extortion and protection rackets which the Trampers had operated under contract with the Boston faction of the Patriarca crime family.

=== Defiant Disciples ===
Hells Angels members Michael J. Blair and Jake Doherty were arrested on June 19, 2016, and charged with beating two members of the Defiant Disciples MC with a flashlight outside a pub in Worcester on May 8, 2016. Witnesses said a total of seven men were involved in the assault. Blair pleaded guilty on January 7, 2019, and was given a two-year suspended prison sentence.

=== Pagan's ===
Seven bikers suffered stab wounds during a brawl involving approximately 50 members of the Hells Angels and the Pagans in front of the Pagans' Fall River chapter clubhouse on May 14, 2022. Four of the wounded were treated at Rhode Island Hospital and three others were taken to Charlton Memorial Hospital.

== Murders ==
=== Susan DeQuina and Robert Garbino ===
Michele Gagnon, a member of the Quebec chapter of the Hells Angels, is believed to be a prime suspect in two unsolved murders that occurred in Lynn in 1979. Gagnon's girlfriend Susan Marie DeQuina, who reportedly wanted to break up with Gagnon because he and his friends were using her car to transport drugs, went missing on October 3, 1979. Shortly after her disappearance, DeQuina's car was found abandoned and burned in Saugus. Authorities believe she was murdered. On November 4, 1979, the dismembered torso of Robert "Bino" Garbino, Gagnon's roommate and a Hells Angels prospect, was discovered by children playing in a dump near where DeQuina's car was found. He had been shot in the head, back and shoulder, and his severed head and hands were later found buried in the yard of his Lynn residence. Police suspect Garbino was killed by the Hells Angels over a drug rip-off, and began searching for Gagnon in relation to the murder. He was found shot to death in an apartment in Bridgeport, Connecticut on November 25, 1979. His death was ruled a suicide, although some authorities believe he did not take his own life.

=== Vincent DeNino ===
Hells Angels members Alan J. Cutler and Edward R. Simard, and another man – John L. Burke – were arrested on February 4, 1986, in connection with the murder of Vincent DeNino, a drug dealer who was found shot dead in the trunk of his car in a supermarket parking lot in Revere on February 29, 1984. According to police, DeNino refused to pay Simard approximately $10,000 owed over a cocaine deal and, after learning that the Hells Angels had put a contract out on his life, sought protection from the rival Trampers MC. With approval from both clubs, he was allegedly lured to Cutler's home and shot in the shoulder with a shotgun before being taken to his car and shot four times in the head. A fourth suspect, Trampers associate and future Patriarca crime family soldier Darin F. "Nino" Bufalino, fled to Kingscourt, Ireland before being apprehended in Fuengirola, Spain, on June 11, 1987. Charges of first-degree murder against Bufalino, Burke and Simard were dismissed on December 10, 1990, when a judge ruled Federal Bureau of Investigation (FBI) wiretap evidence in the case to be inadmissible because there had been an eight-day delay in sealing the tapes.

=== Robert Chadwell, Edward Frampton and David Glasser ===
Berkshire County Hells Angels chapter sergeant-at-arms Adam Lee Hall, along with Caius Veiovis (born Roy Gutfinski Jr.) and Aryan Brotherhood member David Chalue, kidnapped Robert Chadwell, Edward Frampton and David Glasser – Chalue's roommate – from Frampton's home in Pittsfield during the early hours of August 28, 2011 before fatally shooting them. Their bodies, dismembered with an electric circular saw, were discovered in Becket ten days later. Glasser was killed to prevent him testifying against Hall in an unrelated assault case, and Chadwell and Frampton were killed to eliminate witnesses. Chalue, Hall and Veiovis were each convicted of three counts of murder, three of kidnapping, and three of intimidation of a witness during separate trials in 2014. They were each sentenced to three consecutive terms of life in prison.

== Drug trafficking ==
Alan Hogan and Robert Montgomery, both members of the Hells Angels' Lynn chapter, and Thomas Apostolos, a member of the New Hampshire chapter, were imprisoned after police discovered a trailer home converted into a methamphetamine lab in Middleton on January 11, 1980. Two non-club members turned state's evidence and entered the Federal Witness Protection Program following the trial. Three murders in Canada – of a Hells Angel, his wife and his mother – were directly linked to the case.

Five Hells Angels members, including the vice-president of the club's East Coast faction, were arrested in the Greater Boston area on charges of conspiracy to distribute cocaine on May 2, 1985, in connection to the FBI's Operation Roughrider. Three of those taken into custody surrendered peacefully in a raid on a home in Lynn, where federal agents also confiscated a home computer system used to handle the Hells Angels' administrative and financial matters. The three-year investigation, which involved undercover FBI agent Kevin P. Bonner infiltrating the club and making drug deals with numerous chapters across the country, culminated with a total of 133 Hells Angels members and associates being indicted on drug trafficking and racketeering charges after approximately fifty coordinated raids carried out in eleven states. Authorities seized $2 million in cocaine, marijuana, methamphetamine, hashish, PCP and LSD, as well as weapons including Uzi submachine guns and rocket launchers during the operation. Lynn chapter members Glenn "Hoppy" Main and Steve "Fee" Sullivan were sentenced to three years in prison after being convicted, and another – Linwood "Lee" Barrett III – was acquitted. Frank Briggs and Julio "Jules" Lucido of the Berkshire County chapter were sentenced to one year and four years in prison, respectively.

Thirteen members and former members of the Lowell Hells Angels were indicted in September 1991 on charges of conspiracy to distribute methamphetamine as part of a drug ring that operated in Massachusetts and New Hampshire between 1987 and 1991. A further five Hells Angels were arrested on drug charges in connection with the case on June 1, 1992. On January 12, 1993, chapter president Charles T. "Doc" Pasciuti and fourteen others were sentenced after earlier pleading guilty to possession with intent to distribute methamphetamine, and conspiracy. Sentences ranged from fifteen years' imprisonment for Pasciuti to three years' probation. Several government witnesses in the case – including Crazy Eights MC president Gaylen Blake, Crazy Eights associates David and Larry Machado, Die Hards MC president Gordon Tardiff and HAMC associate Robin Golden – entered the Federal Witness Protection Program.

In this episode from the Drug Enforcement Administration Museum and Visitors Center's “Stories from the Collection,” the museum showcases a 1993Harley Davidson motorcycle seized from Greg Domey, president of the Salem, MA chapter of the Hells Angels.

The Drug Enforcement Administration (DEA) began an investigation of the Salem Hells Angels chapter in February 1995. As part of an undercover operation, DEA agent Phil Muollo infiltrated the club for eighteen months and purchased kilograms of drugs from Gregory "Greg" Domey, the chapter president as well as the Hells Angels' leader on the East Coast, and other members. The investigation was also aided by the use of an informant. On July 1, 1995, John R. "Johnny Bart" Bartolomeo and another Hells Angel chased Girard Giorgio – a member of the Devils Desciples – down Route 3 as he rode his motorcycle and badly beat him and stripped him of his colors after catching up with him, leaving him in critical condition. Bartolomeo then killed another Devils Desciples member, William "Cat" Michaels, on July 29, 1995. Michaels was riding his motorcycle on Route 18 in Weymouth when Bartolomeo accelerated an automobile into him. The operation culminated with the arrests of sixteen Hells Angels members and associates during raids on ten locations, including the Salem chapter clubhouse, on September 5, 1996. Quantities of cocaine and methamphetamine were also seized. All sixteen people indicted were convicted. Domey was sentenced to twenty years' imprisonment in 1997 after pleading guilty to running a criminal enterprise that sold cocaine and methamphetamine. Bartolomeo pleaded guilty to possession with intent to distribute, and conspiracy to distribute, cocaine and methamphetamine on May 21, 1998. State and federal authorities agreed not to charge him with the attacks on two Devils Desciples members in conjunction with a plea agreement. He was sentenced to thirty-five years'.

== Arms trafficking ==
Two Hells Angels members, a club "prospect" and an associate were arrested on firearms charges in March 1986 as part of Operation One Percenter, a Bureau of Alcohol, Tobacco, Firearms and Explosives (ATF) investigation. "Full-patch" members George Harvey of Revere and Peter Lazarus Jr. of Lynn were convicted; Harvey was sentenced to serve a year in prison at the Federal Correctional Institution, Danbury, while Lazarus was sentenced to probation.

== Racketeering ==
The Hells Angels took over ancillary activities of the Patriarca crime family's Boston faction, such as loansharking and drug dealing, from the East Boston-based Trampers, who had previously overseen operations under contract with the Mafia, circa 1986. Hells Angels member Mark "Rebel" McKenna was one of eleven men indicted on charges of loansharking and racketeering on June 9, 1987, for operating the largest loansharking ring in United States history, which collected $3.5 million from approximately three-hundred-and-fifty victims. The indictments followed a two-year state and federal investigation of organized crime in Boston.

A joint investigation of the Hells Angels' Boston and Salem chapters by the ATF, DEA, MSP and Internal Revenue Service (IRS) that began in January 2007 resulted in the arrests of six club members on various charges during a series of raids on September 20, 2007. Christopher Sweeney pleaded guilty to possessing a firearm and a silencer, and was sentenced to two years and four months' imprisonment on December 4, 2008. Christopher Ranieri was sentenced to one year in prison and restitution to the U.S. Treasury in the amount of $33,438 on February 3, 2009, after pleading guilty to two counts of failure to file federal income tax returns.
