= St. Joseph's Convent and School =

- U.S. National Register of Historic Places
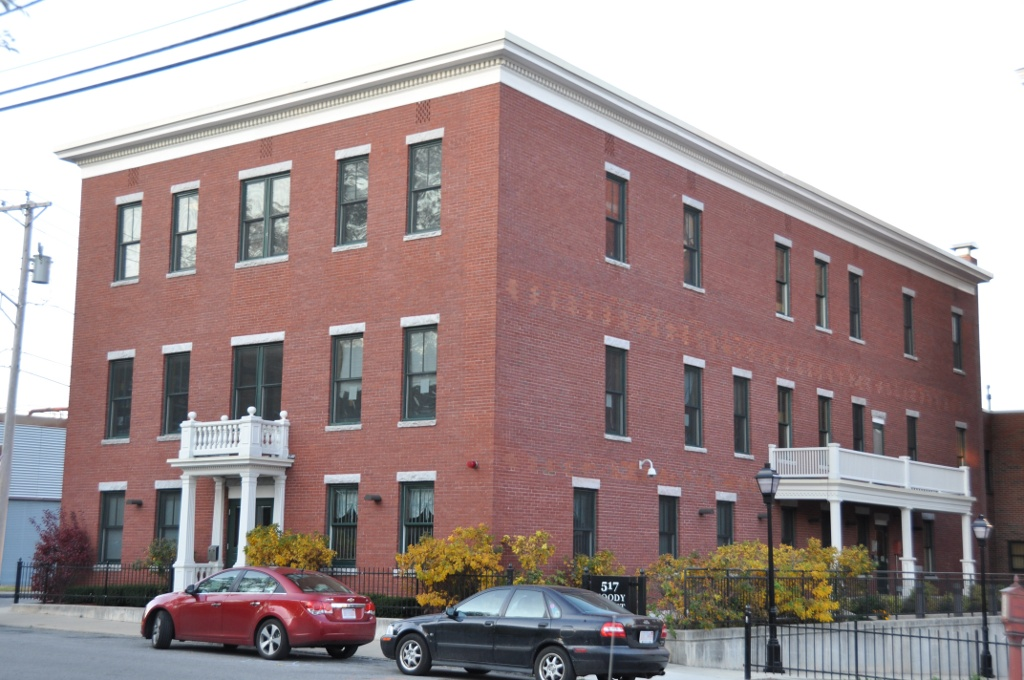
- The convent building; the school is immediately adjacent

- Location within Massachusetts Location within the United States
- Location: Lowell, Massachusetts
- Coordinates: 42°39′2″N 71°19′20″W
- Built: 1883
- Architect: Morin, F.X.,
- Architectural style: Colonial Revival, Italianate
- NRHP reference No.: 02000789
- Added to NRHP: July 19, 2002

St. Joseph's Convent and School is a historic convent and school at 517 Moody Street in Lowell, Massachusetts. The school is a three-story brick building built in 1883. Its Italianate styling includes an extended wooden cornice decorated with brackets. The convent, built in 1911, is a modestly ornmanented Colonial Revival three-story brick building. Most of the interiors of the buildings were significantly altered over the course of the 20th century, losing most of their historical integrity; however, a 2001 rehabilitation has reintroduced interior styling in keeping with the age and style of the buildings.

The parish of St. Joseph was established in 1868 by the Roman Catholic Archdiocese of Boston, to cater to the religious needs of the burgeoning French-Canadian Catholic population that was one of the significant demographic groups working in Lowell's mills. The school was established by the diocese in 1883 to provide French-language education to the children of these immigrants, with nuns of the Grey Nuns of the Cross as teachers. The nuns initially lived in a house on the property. By the 1890s enrollments had increased such that more space was needed, and the Saint Joseph's Roman Catholic College for Boys was built on Merrimack Street, and this school was devoted to girls. The convent was built in 1911 to provide increased space for housing of the nuns teaching at these facilities. The St. Joseph's school eventually spawned three other Catholic schools in Lowell. However, by the 1980s enrollments had declined, and the school was closed in 1993. The buildings have been rehabilitated by a local nonprofit organization.

The buildings were listed on the National Register of Historic Places in 2002.

== See also ==
- National Register of Historic Places listings in Lowell, Massachusetts
