= Tyler Park =

Tyler Park may refer to:

- Tyler Park, Louisville, a neighborhood in Kentucky
- Tyler Park Historic District, in Lowell, Massachusetts

== See also ==
- Tyler State Park (disambiguation)
