= GUC =

GUC may refer to:

== People ==
- Ezgi Güç (born 1992), Turkish volleyball player
- Volkan Güç (born 1980), Turkish volleyball player

== Other uses ==
- Gallant Unit Citation, of the United States Air Force
- Garissa University College, in Kenya
- Global Unichip Corporation, a Taiwanese ASIC designer
- German University in Cairo, in Egypt
- Godalming United Church, in England
- Grace Universalist Church, in Lowell, Massachusetts, United States
- Grand Union Canal, in England
- Growing Up Coy, a 2016 American documentary
- Growing Up Creepie, a Canadian-American animated television series
- Gunnison–Crested Butte Regional Airport, in Colorado, United States
- a codon for the amino acid valine
- Wayuu language, spoken in Colombia and Venezuela
