= Worcester House =

Worcester House may refer to:

- Worcester Park House, a now ruined building built in 1607 for or by the 4th Earl of Worcester in Worcester Park in Surrey in the United Kingdom
- Worcester House, London, a mansion that stood on the Strand until its demolition in the late 17th century, named for Edward Somerset, 2nd Marquess of Worcester
- Worcester House (Lowell), a registered historic place in Lowell, Massachusetts in the United States of America
