= South Common =

South Common may refer to:

- South Common Historic District, Lowell, Massachusetts, United States
- South Common Centre Bus Terminal, Mississauga, Ontario, Canada
- South Edmonton Common, Edmonton, Alberta, Canada
- South Commons, Chicago
