= Howe Building =

- U.S. National Register of Historic Places
- U.S. Historic district – Contributing property
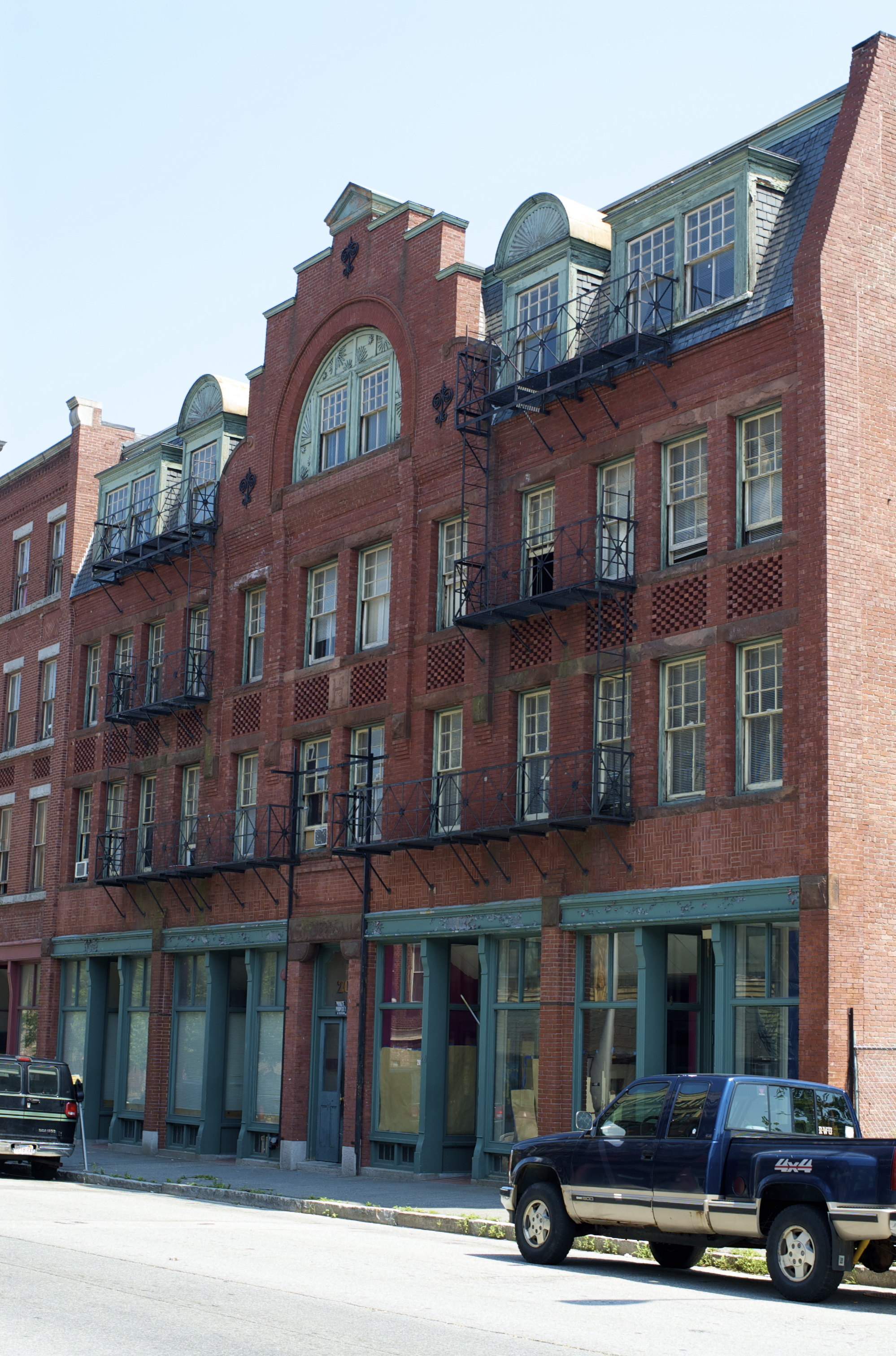

- Location within Massachusetts Location within the United States
- Location: Lowell, Massachusetts
- Coordinates: 42°38′26″N 71°18′46″W
- Built: 1883
- Architect: Howe Brothers
- Architectural style: Queen Anne, Romanesque
- Part of: Lowell National Historical Park (ID78003149)
- NRHP reference No.: 89001608

Significant dates
- Added to NRHP: October 12, 1989
- Designated CP: June 5, 1978

The Howe Building is a historic commercial building at 208 Middlesex Street in downtown Lowell, Massachusetts. The four story brick building was built in 1883, and is one of the city's finest Queen Anne commercial buildings. Its architecturally prominent features include a mansard roof (unusual for the style and period), and a large central stepped gable with an arched window at the center. It was built by John F. and Henry C. Howe, brothers who were heavily involved in the commercial development of downtown Lowell who also sat on the city council.

The building was listed on the National Register of Historic Places in 1989.

== See also ==
- National Register of Historic Places listings in Lowell, Massachusetts
