= Washington Square Historic District (Lowell, Massachusetts) =

Historic district in Massachusetts, United States

- U.S. National Register of Historic Places
- U.S. Historic district
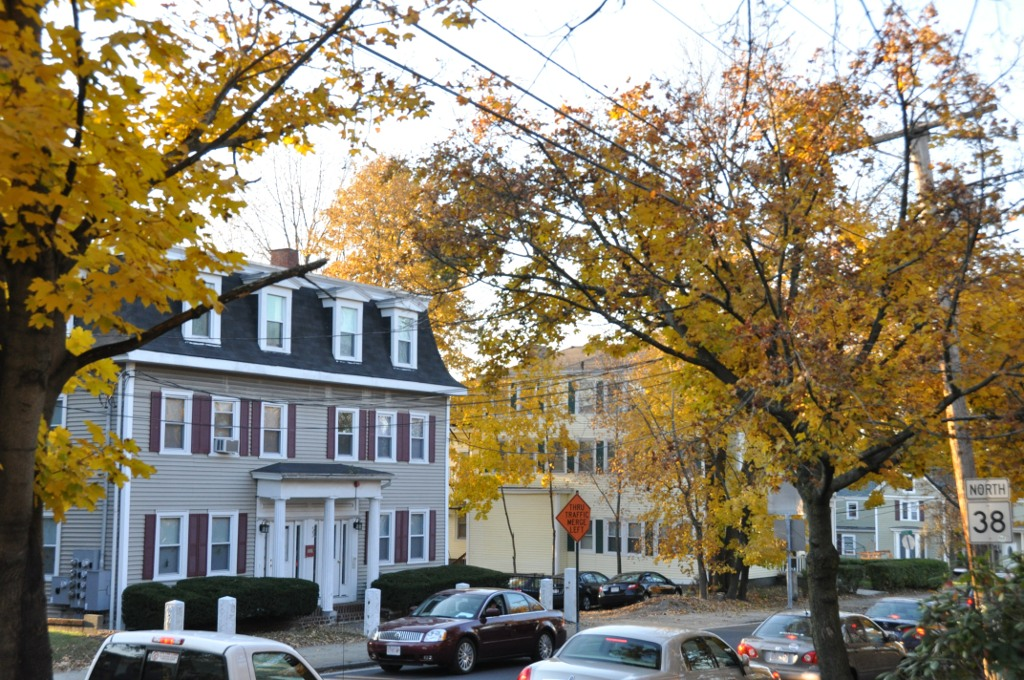
- Nesmith Street (Rt. 38) near Kittredge Park

- Location within Massachusetts Location within the United States
- Location: Lowell, Massachusetts
- Coordinates: 42°38′35″N 71°17′54″W
- Built: 1831
- Architect: Wadsworth, Alexander
- Architectural style: Greek Revival, Second Empire, Italianate
- NRHP reference No.: 82001995 (original); 99001307 (increase)

Significant dates
- Added to NRHP: August 11, 1982
- Boundary increase: November 12, 1999

The Washington Square Historic District of Lowell, Massachusetts encompasses a historic subdivision laid out in 1832. The focal point of the subdivision is Kittridge Park, which lies on the eastern side of the district and was an original part of the subdivision plan developed by the Nesmith Brothers. It was the first significant residential subdivision in the city aimed at a wealthier clientele, and was designed by landscape architect Alexander Wadsworth. The district was added to the National Register of Historic Places in 1982, and expanded slightly in 1999.

== Description and history ==
The Washington Square district is located east of Lowell's central business district, across the Concord River and a short way south of the Merrimack River. Its principal intersection is that of east-west Andover Street and north-south Nesmith Street, with Kittridge Park at the northeastern corner. The district extends north, west and south from the park for a little more than one block, and consists of modest-sized houses on small lots (c. 5,000 square feet (460 m^{2})).

The area was created as a residential subdivision in 1831 by the brothers John and Thomas Nesmith, with the purchase of 150 acres (61 ha). The brothers retained Alexander Wadsworth to lay out what is now called Kittridge Park and the surrounding road and lots. Early deeds for lots sold for development required the planting of trees along the street. The earliest houses built were in the Federal and Greek Revival styles, but most of the houses, built in the 1840s and 1850s, are Italianate in style. Buyers of houses in the area included supervisors and professional staff of Lowell's mills, as well as smaller-scale businessmen in the city. Two mill owners bought houses in the district: C. P. Talbot, owner of the Talbot Mills in North Billerica, and John Holt, who owned a flannel factory on Davidson Street. Some houses were built after 1860, and only a very few postdate 1900. The district largely mirrors the area of the original subdivision, with only modern intrusions excepted. It is roughly bounded on the north by East Merrimack Street, on the east by Park Street, on the south by Andover Street, except for the block of Nesmith Street immediately to its south, and on the west by High Street, whose addresses are excluded from the district.

== See also ==
- National Register of Historic Places listings in Lowell, Massachusetts
