= Jerathmell Bowers House =

Historic house in Massachusetts, United States

- U.S. National Register of Historic Places
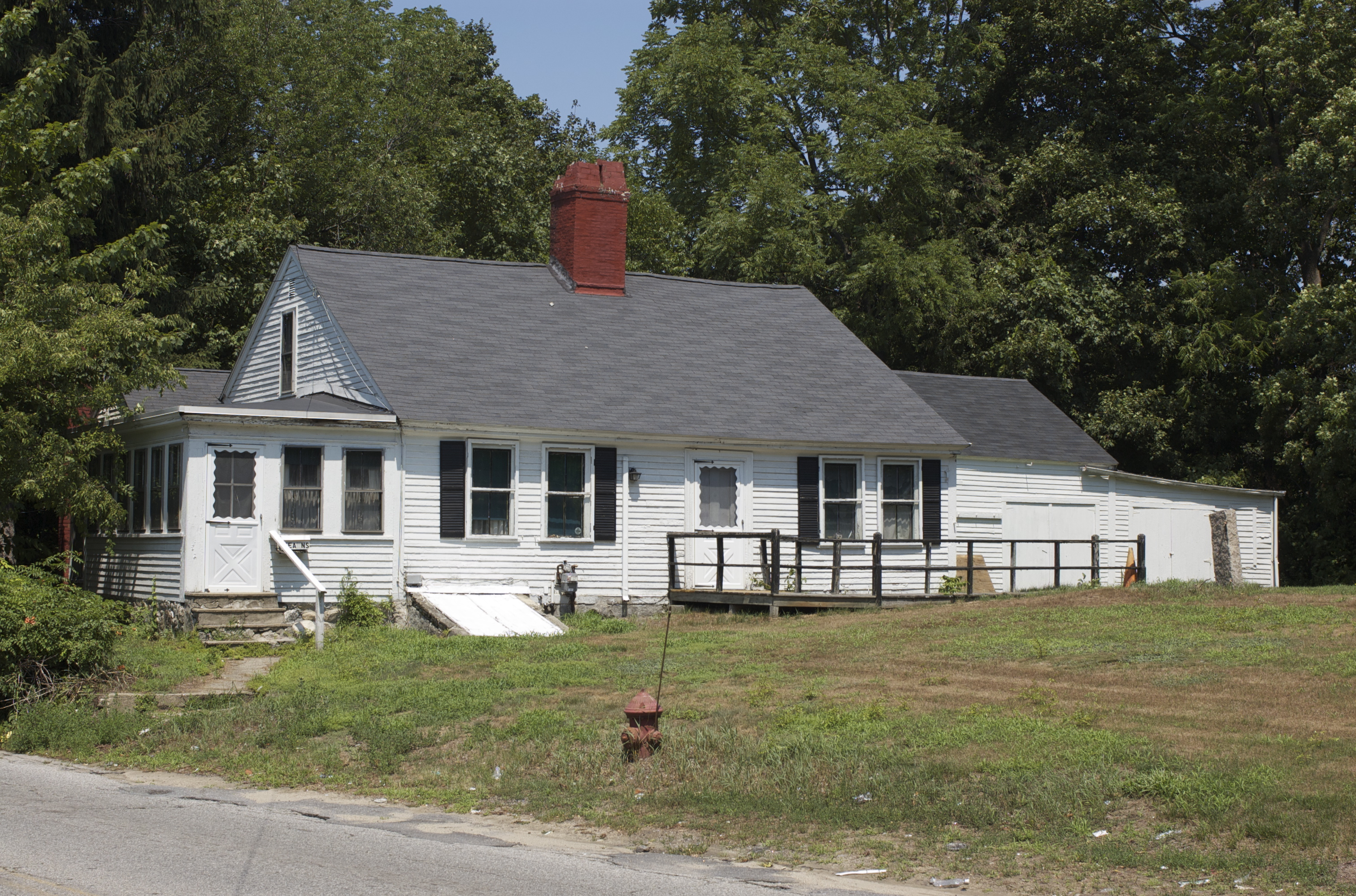

- Location within Massachusetts Location within the United States
- Location: 150 Wood St., Lowell, Massachusetts
- Coordinates: 42°37′50″N 71°21′19″W
- Area: 3 acres (1.2 ha) (since subdivided)
- Built: c.1671 (1981 survey) c.1673 (NRHP)
- Architectural style: Colonial
- NRHP reference No.: 93001588
- Added to NRHP: January 28, 1994

The Jerathmell Bowers House is believed to have built circa 1673, at 150 Wood Street in Lowell, Massachusetts. It is the oldest known home in Lowell. It was listed on the National Register of Historic Places in 1994.

== Description and history ==
The Jerathmell Bowers House in western Lowell, on the east side of Wood Street north of its junction with Westford Street. It is a 1 1/2-story Cape style house, with a gabled roof, central brick chimney, and clapboarded exterior. It is oriented with the gable end facing the street and the main facade facing south. The facade is five bays wide, with two windows on either side of a central entrance. All of these elements are placed asymmetrically, with the entrance slightly right of center. To the left of the main block is an early 19th-century three-season sunroom, and older ells (of 18th and 19th-century construction) extend to the right and back. The interior of the main block has a typical colonial-era four-room center-chimney layout, with the doorway leading into a narrow vestibule with a winding staircase providing access to the attic level.

Jerathmell Bowers, a native of Cambridge, Massachusetts, purchased land in what was then Chelmsford in 1670 or 1671. His son's birth was recorded in Chelmsford in 1673, suggesting that at least part of this house was standing then. The National Register of Historic Places form states that "It appears likely that its ca. 1673 date is correct, but the extensive interior changes that have concealed original fabric make it impossible to confirm this positively." By the 1800s, the farm covered about 150 acres (61 ha). Jerathmell Bowers was a prominent local citizen, serving as a selectman and militia leader. He also operated a distillery here. During the early colonial period of Chelmsford, it was one of 19 garrison houses used for refuge by citizens during attacks by Native American tribes.

The area where the house stands became part of Lowell in the late 1820s, following the early development of mills on the Merrimack River. The house remained in the hands of Bowers descendants at least until the property was listed on the National Register in 1994. In 2013 there was a proposal to tear down the house to make more room for a new commercial building. The entrance to the new building was proposed to be where this house is located. After advocating to keep the house, by the Lowell Heritage Partnership and Lowell Historical Society, the decision was made to save and stabilize the house. In November 2015 it was reported that the developers of the neighboring shopping center are going to start restoring the home in spring 2016.

== See also ==
- List of the oldest buildings in Massachusetts
- National Register of Historic Places listings in Lowell, Massachusetts
