= F. Bradford Morse Federal Building =

- US Post Office
- U.S. National Register of Historic Places
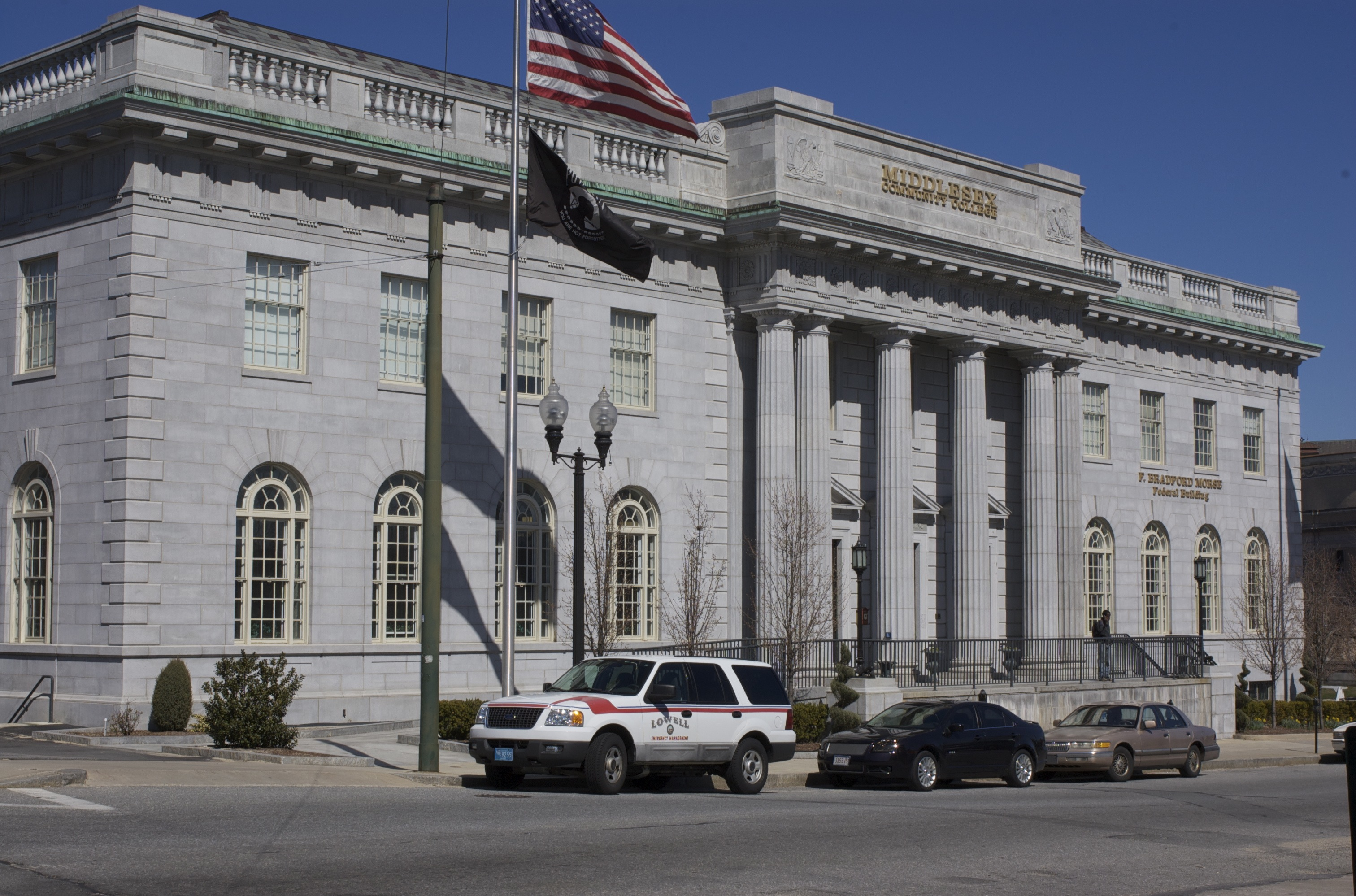

- Location within Massachusetts Location within the United States
- Location: Lowell, Massachusetts
- Coordinates: 42°38′43″N 71°18′24″W
- Built: 1930
- Architect: Daidy, George Augustine
- Architectural style: Classical Revival
- NRHP reference No.: 86000373
- Added to NRHP: March 10, 1986

The F. Bradford Morse Federal Building, formerly the United States Post Office is a historic post office at 50 Kearney Square in Lowell, Massachusetts.

The building was designed by George Augustine Daidy and was built in 1930. It was added to the National Register of Historic Places in 1986. The building was acquired in 1996 by Middlesex Community College, which renovated the facility for $11 million. It was renamed in honor of local Congressman and statesman F. Bradford Morse on December 8, 2006.

Today, the building houses the MCC Lowell campus library, the Honors Center, and art studio and classrooms.

It is distinct from 1895 Lowell Post Office, which is also listed on the National Register.

== See also ==
- National Register of Historic Places listings in Lowell, Massachusetts
