= Lowell Post Office =

- U.S. National Register of Historic Places
- U.S. Historic district – Contributing property
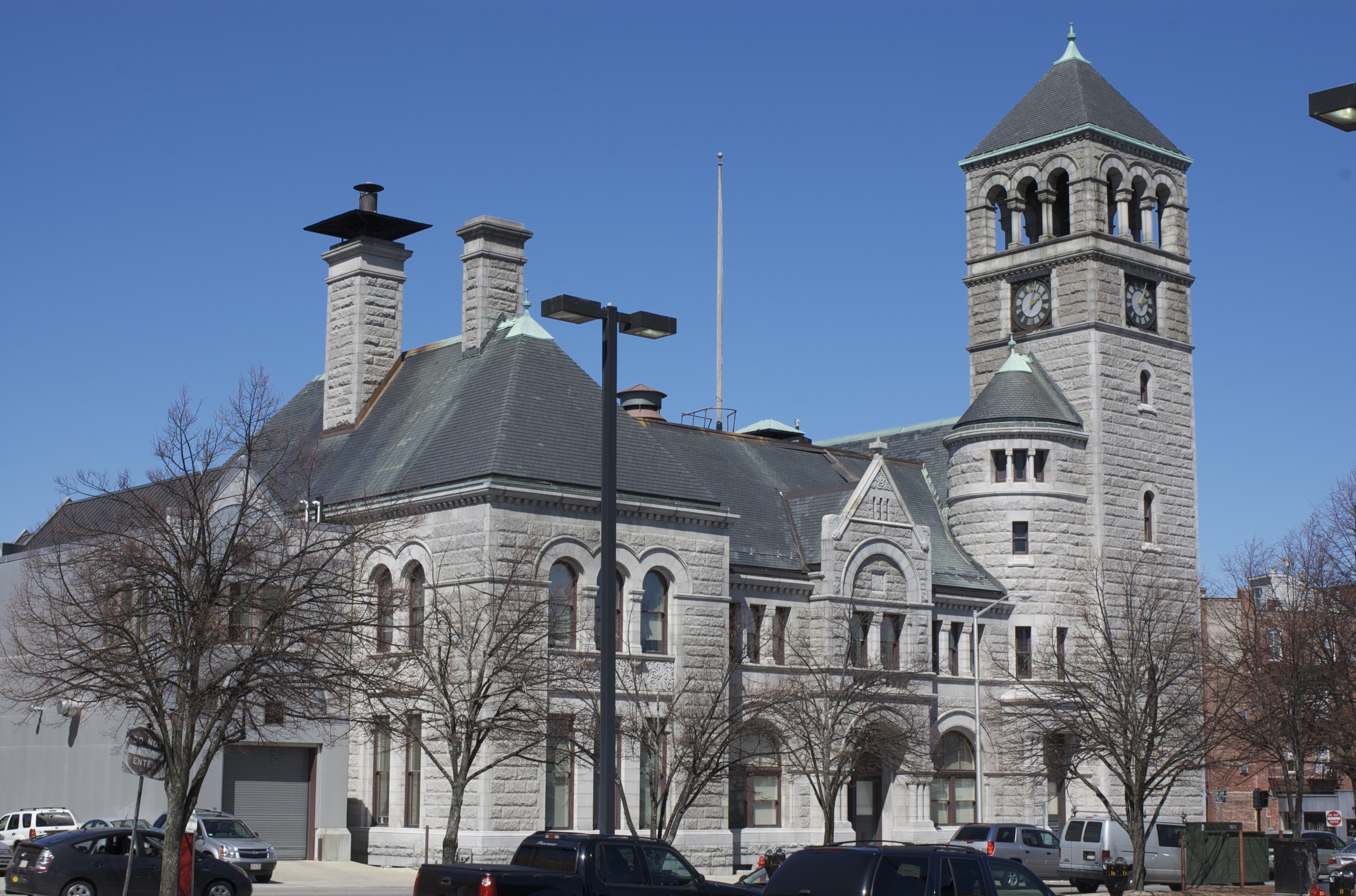

- Location within Massachusetts Location within the United States
- Location: Lowell, Massachusetts
- Coordinates: 42°38′28″N 71°18′34″W
- Built: 1893
- Architect: Edbrooke, W.J.
- Architectural style: Romanesque
- Part of: Lowell National Historical Park (ID78003149)
- NRHP reference No.: 02001084

Significant dates
- Added to NRHP: October 4, 2002
- Designated CP: June 5, 1978

The 1895 Lowell Post Office is an historic post office building at 89 Appleton Street in Lowell, Massachusetts. The imposing two-story granite building was completed in 1895 to a design by W. J. Edbrooke. The building has an H shape, and has a profusion of typical Richardsonian Romanesque features, included rounded arches over windows and a recessed entry. The focal point of the building is its five-story square clock tower, which is topped by a pyramidal roof supported by tripled round arches on each face.

The building was used as a post office until 1936, when a new building on Kearney Square (now the F. Bradford Morse Federal Building) was put in service. The building continued to house federal offices until the 1970s, by which time its ownership had been transferred to the city. The city then used it for offices until the 1990s.

The building was listed on the National Register of Historic Places in 2002. It now houses a division of the Middlesex County juvenile court system.

== See also ==
- National Register of Historic Places listings in Lowell, Massachusetts
- List of United States post offices
