= Tyler State Park =

Tyler State Park can refer to either of two state parks in the United States:

- Tyler State Park (Pennsylvania)
- Tyler State Park (Texas)

== See also ==
- Tyler Park (disambiguation)
