= Warren Fox Building =

- U.S. National Register of Historic Places
- U.S. Historic district – Contributing property
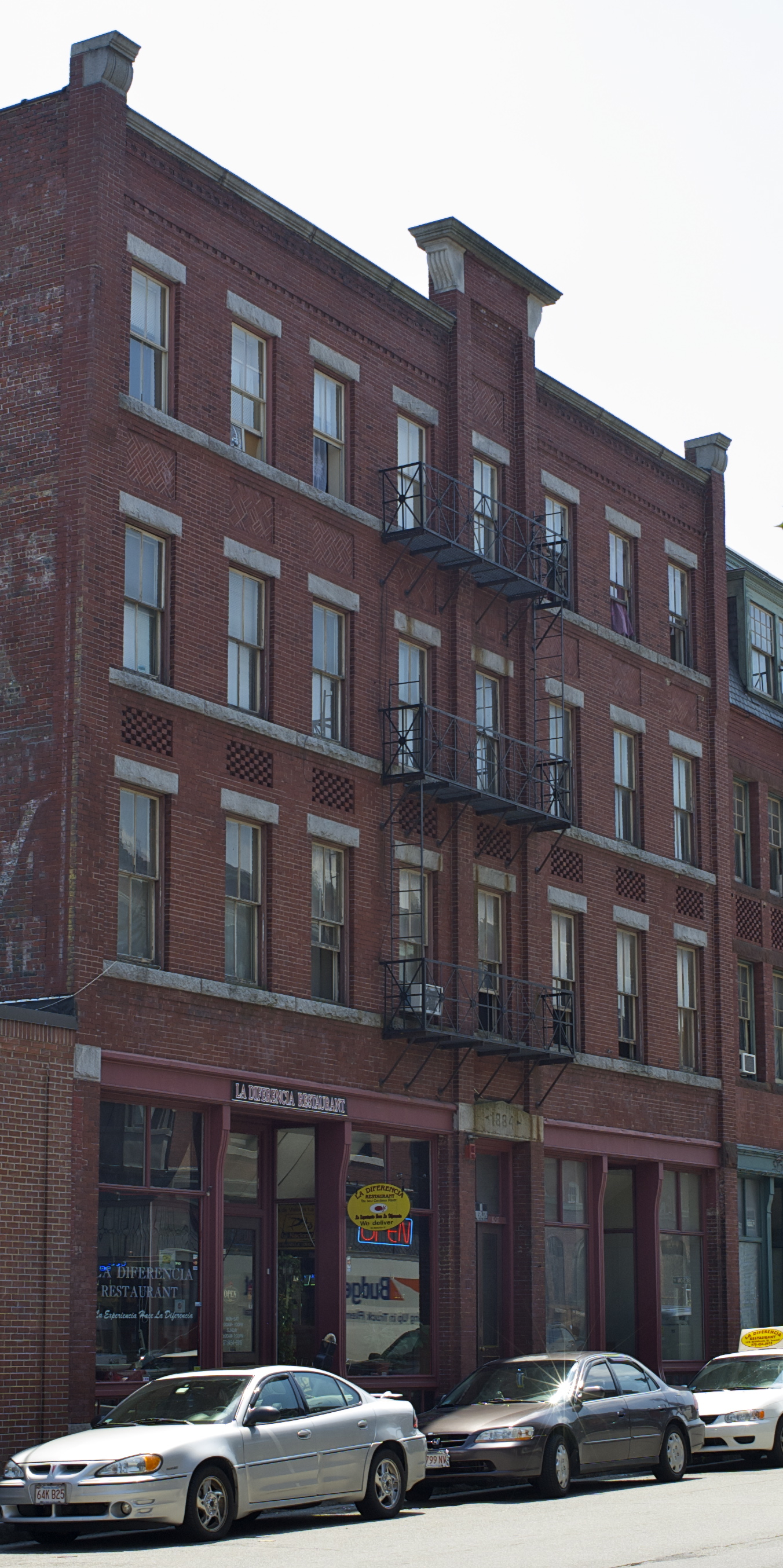

- Location within Massachusetts Location within the United States
- Location: 190–196 Middlesex Street, Lowell, Massachusetts
- Coordinates: 42°38′26″N 71°18′45″W
- Built: 1884
- Architectural style: Late Victorian
- Part of: Lowell National Historical Park (ID78003149)
- NRHP reference No.: 89001609

Significant dates
- Added to NRHP: October 12, 1989
- Designated CP: June 5, 1978

The Warren Fox Building is a historic commercial building in Lowell, Massachusetts. The four-story brick building was built in 1884 by Warren Fox, and is a good example of commercial Queen Anne architecture. The building is nine bays wide; brick piers rise surrounding the central bay, where the main entrance is, and rise above the level of the flat roof to form a cornice.

The building was listed on the National Register of Historic Places in 1989; it was included in the bounds of the Lowell National Historical Park in 1978.

== See also ==
- National Register of Historic Places listings in Lowell, Massachusetts
