= Middlesex Community College (Massachusetts) =

Public community college in Massachusetts, United States

Coordinates: 42°31′28.18″N 71°16′26.93″W

- Motto: Student success starts here
- Type: Public community college
- Established: 1970; 56 years ago
- Accreditation: NECHE
- President: Philip J. Sisson
- Students: 7,770 (fall 2022)
- Undergraduates: 9,712
- Location: Bedford and Lowell, Massachusetts, United States
- Mascot: Swoops the Owl
- Website: www.middlesex.mass.edu

Middlesex Community College is a public community college with two campuses in Massachusetts, one in Lowell and the other in Bedford.

== Description ==
Founded in 1970, Middlesex Community College has grown to become one of the largest community colleges in Massachusetts.

== History ==
The college was founded in 1970 in leased buildings on the grounds of the Veterans Hospital in Bedford, Massachusetts. Starting in 1972, the college also leased space at the former Marist Preparatory Seminary, off Springs Road in Bedford. A third campus in Burlington, Massachusetts opened in September 1981 in a former middle-school building.

In 1988, the Commonwealth of Massachusetts bought the Marist property for the college; new prefabricated buildings were erected there, and the renovated Bedford campus opened in 1992.

In 1987, Middlesex opened a temporary campus at the Wannalancit Mills complex in Lowell. To establish a permanent Lowell campus, the college purchased a six-story corporate training center at Kearney Square from Wang Laboratories in 1990 and relocated its Lowell activities there in 1991. The Wannalancit Mills buildings then came under the management of the University of Massachusetts Lowell. In 2004, the college expanded into a former federal office building across the street from the MCC tower. In April 2008, the college acquired a former Boston & Maine railroad depot in Lowell, for future use by performing arts programs. As of December 2008, the college has acquired the Smith Baker Center, a former church, and will be sharing it with UMass Lowell.

=== Presidents ===
- James E. Houlihan, Jr. 1970–1988
- Evan S. Dobelle, 1988–1990
- Carole Cowan, 1990–2014
- James Mabry, 2014–2021
- Philip J. Sisson, 2021–present

== Campuses ==
The Bedford campus is situated on 200 acres (0.81 km^{2}) located off Springs Road, close to U.S. Route 3. Bordering the town of Billerica, the campus incorporates 11 buildings that house classrooms, laboratories, offices, a library, the Medical Education Imaging Center and the MCC Concert Hall. A bookstore, cafeteria, student lounge and fitness center are located in the Bedford Campus Center.

Near the Bedford campus, on Concord Road, a historic saltbox-style farmhouse, now called the Middlesex Meetinghouse, is used primarily for college, corporate and community gatherings.

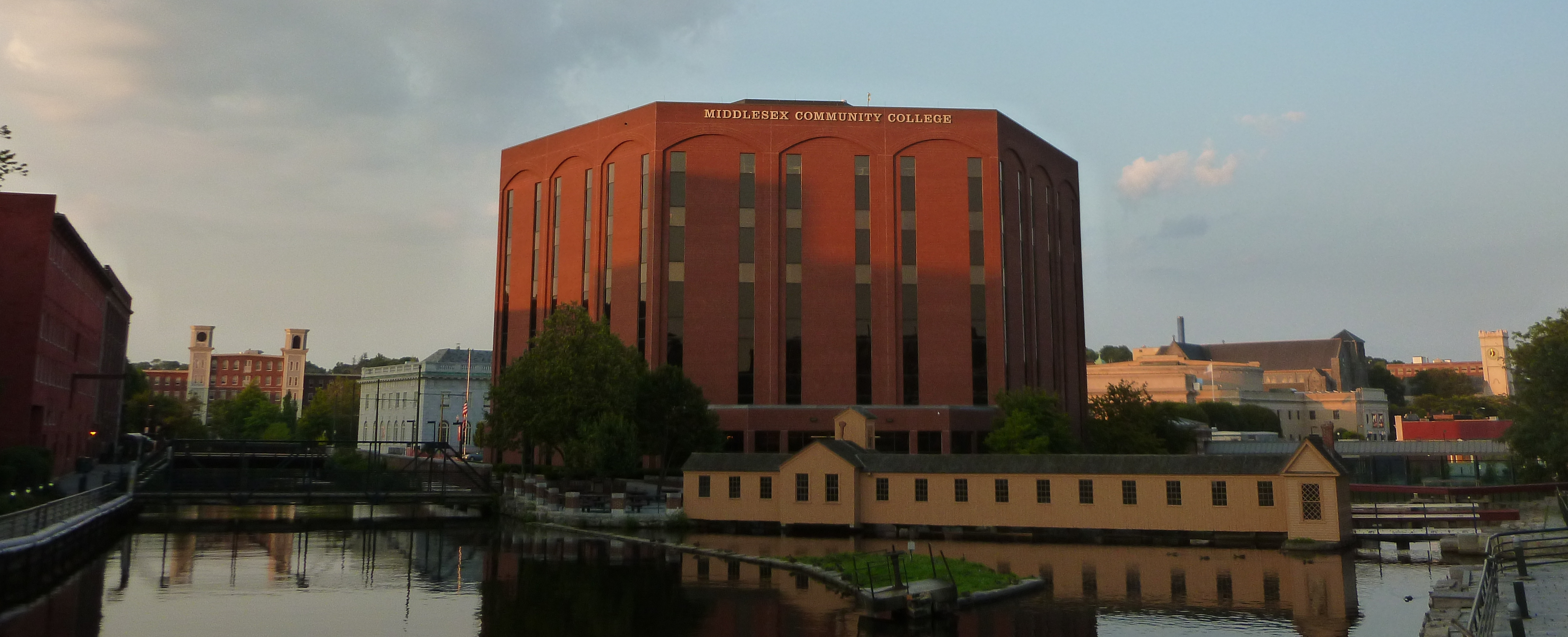
The main building of the college's Lowell campus, with historic Massachusetts Mills and the F. Bradford Morse Federal Building at left, a gatehouse of the Lowell canal system in the foreground, and Lowell Memorial Auditorium and Merrimack Repertory Theatre at right.

The college's Lowell campus is situated at Kearney Square, in the heart of the city, at the confluence of the Concord River and the Pawtucket Canal. It includes the five-story City Building, with classrooms, offices and a cafeteria. The building sits on the site of the former Rex Center.

The recently restored Federal Building, located across Merrimack Street, houses a library, classrooms, a visual arts room, and conference areas. Across the bridge from the City Building on Davidson Street is the MCC Theatre, a flexible 90-seat performance space where the MCC Theatre Company stages productions. In September 2008, the theatre received cushioned seats from another theatre, and now has 100 seats.

The Health, Science & Technology Center, located on nearby Middle Street, includes the Middlesex Dental Hygiene Clinic, classrooms, laboratories and the Nursing Learning Center.

The college also maintains the historic John Nesmith House, located on Andover Street in Lowell, which is supported by the MCC Foundation. It houses the Lester J. Grant Center for Economic Development and the Elkin B. McCallum Center for International Studies.

On Howe Street, the college has their Howe Building Annex, which the top floor is used for dance, music, and voice classes. The bottom floor is a storage/garage for facilities.

== Academics ==
Middlesex Community College offers 57 associate degree programs and 25 certificate programs, as well as many short-term, highly focused programs in selected career fields. Students can take classes during the day, evening, on weekends, and online. MCC students can now complete selected bachelor's degree programs at the college offered in conjunction with Massachusetts state colleges. More than 5,000 Middlesex students take courses online through Middlesex Interactive, the college's online learning network offered throughout the year. MCC also has an extensive array of noncredit courses offering personal and professional-development opportunities. Middlesex Community College is accredited by the New England Commission of Higher Education.

The student population at Middlesex ranges from recent high school graduates to adults returning to school. Recent demographic studies show that 44 percent of MCC students attend full-time, 21 percent have dependent children, 82 percent are employed, 42 percent receive financial aid, and 45 percent have had prior college experience. Survey data and follow-up studies of MCC graduates within one year of graduation indicate that 97 percent were either pursuing further higher education or were employed in a field related to their training at MCC.

== Gallery ==
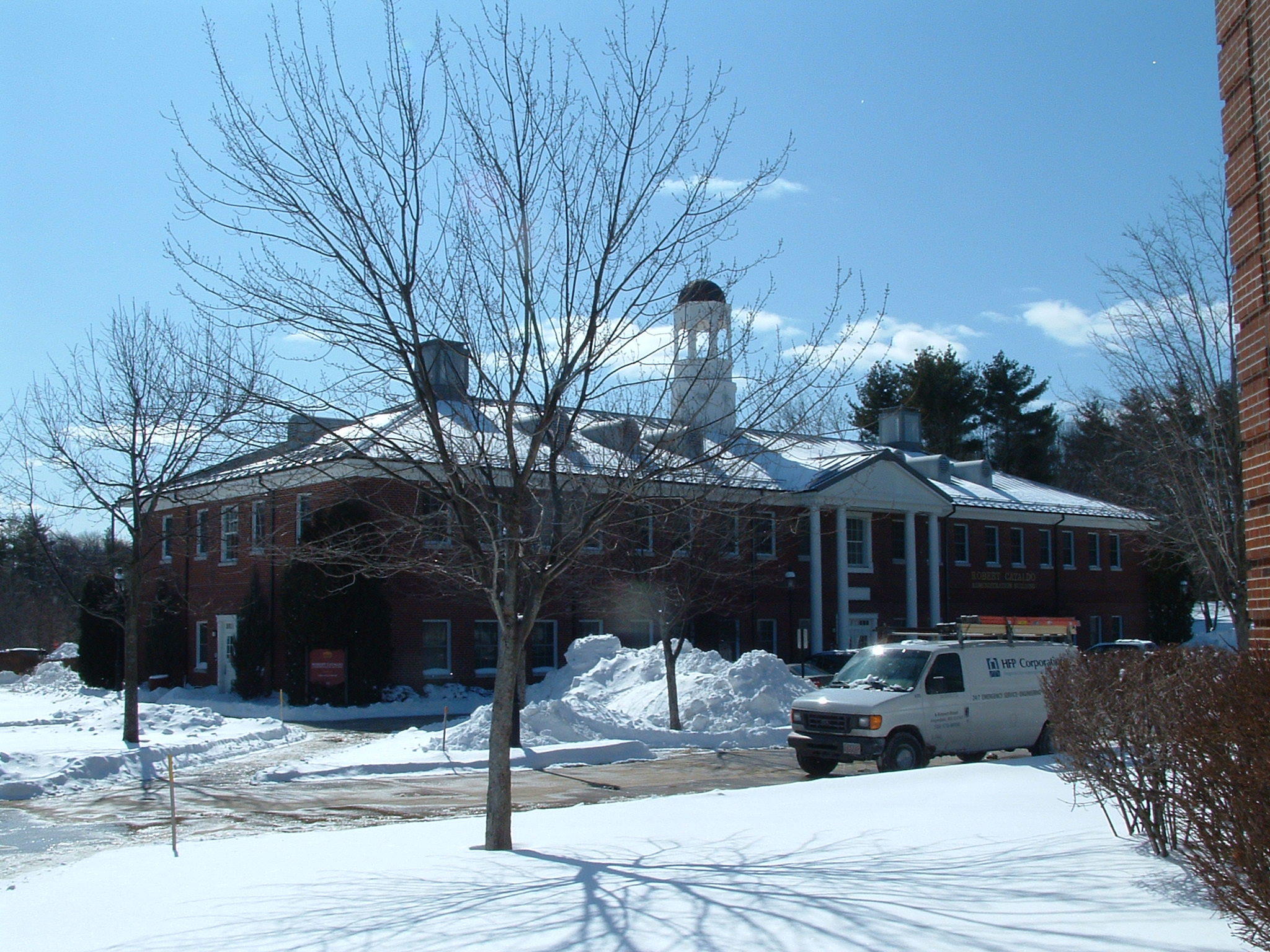
Bedford campus: administration building

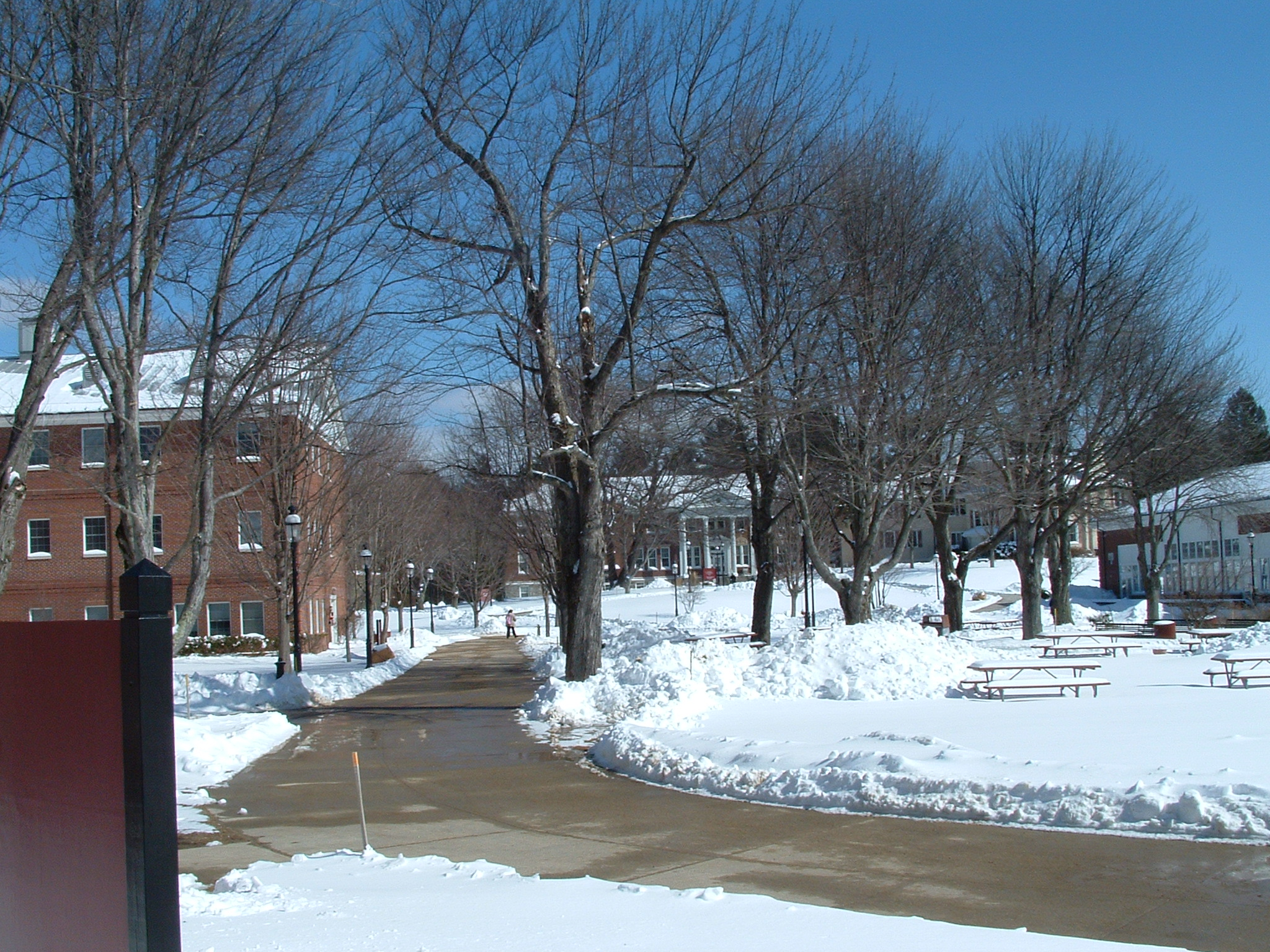
Bedford campus (left to right): Henderson Hall, North Academic Hall, Student Center

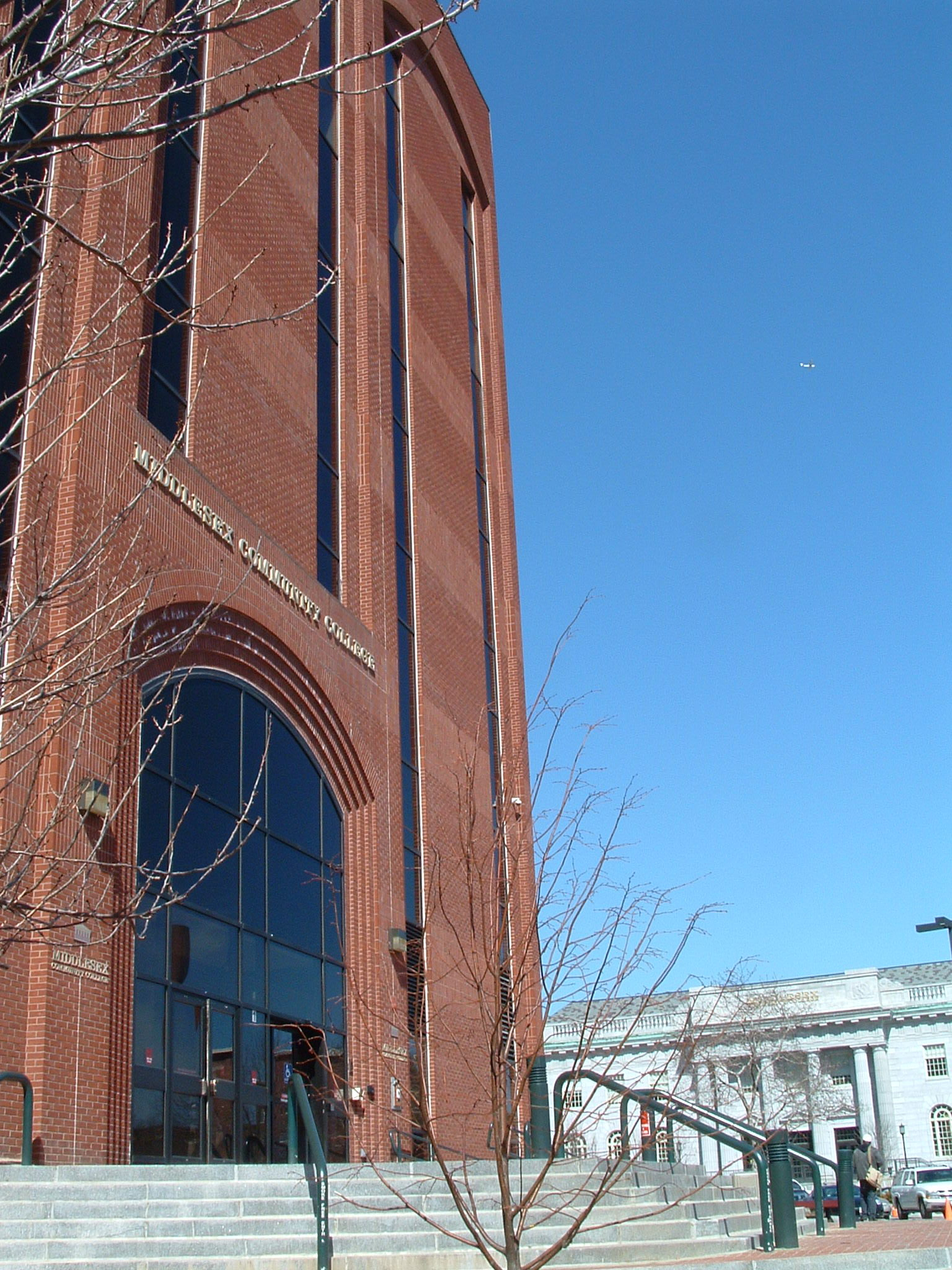
Lowell campus: City Building and Federal Building

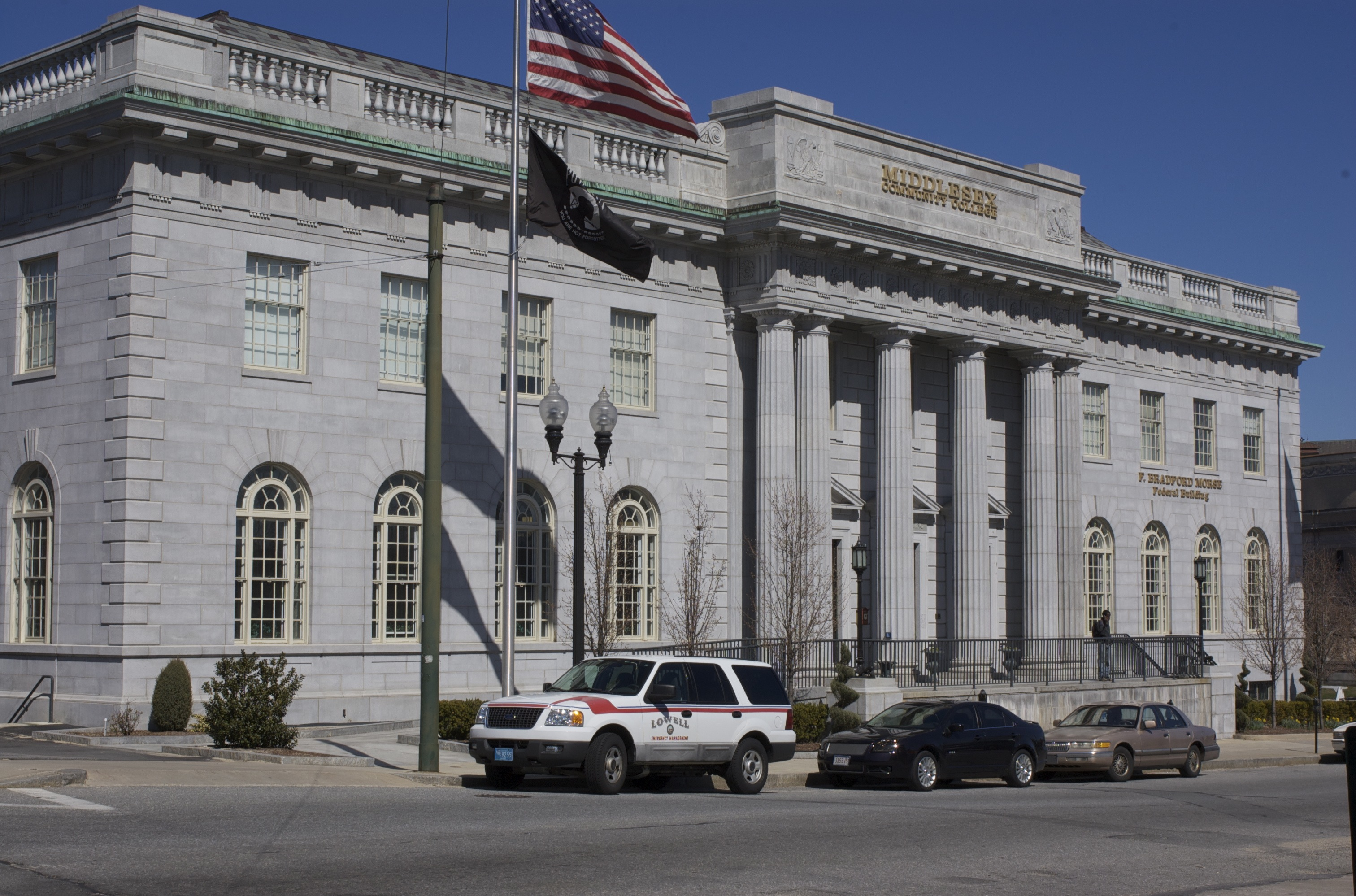
Lowell campus: Federal Building

== Notable alumni ==
- Calvin Kattar – professional mixed martial artist
- Rady Mom – politician
- Steven Wright - comedian
