= Worcester House (Lowell, Massachusetts) =

Historic house in Massachusetts, United States

- U.S. National Register of Historic Places
- U.S. Historic district – Contributing property
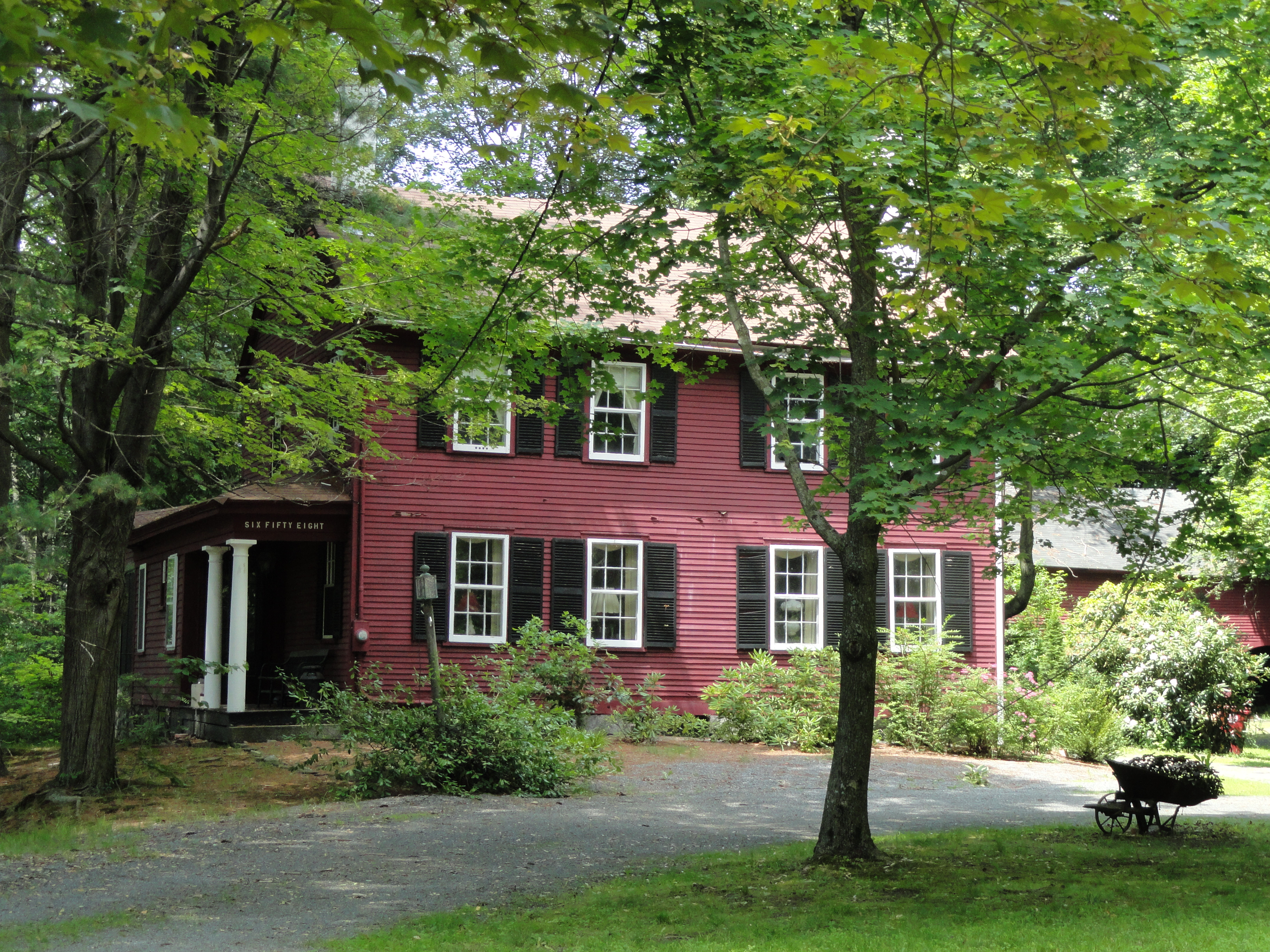

- Location within Massachusetts Location within the United States
- Location: Lowell, Massachusetts
- Coordinates: 42°38′42″N 71°16′50″W
- Built: 1802
- Architectural style: Greek Revival, Federal
- Part of: Andover Street Historic District (ID00000568)
- NRHP reference No.: 83004091

Significant dates
- Added to NRHP: December 22, 1983
- Designated CP: June 2, 2000

The Worcester House is a historic house at 658 Andover Street in Lowell, Massachusetts. This vernacular Federal style farmhouse was built c. 1802 by Eldad Worcester, on land originally purchased by his grandfather, and is the oldest house on Andover Street. The area remained farmland through most of the 19th century. The house is architecturally unusual for the period, with a four-bay facade and its main entrance located on one of the sides.

The house was listed on the National Register of Historic Places in 1983, and included in the Andover Street Historic District in 2000.

== See also ==
- National Register of Historic Places listings in Lowell, Massachusetts
