= Musketaquid Mills =

Historic textile mill in Lowell, Massachusetts

- U.S. National Register of Historic Places
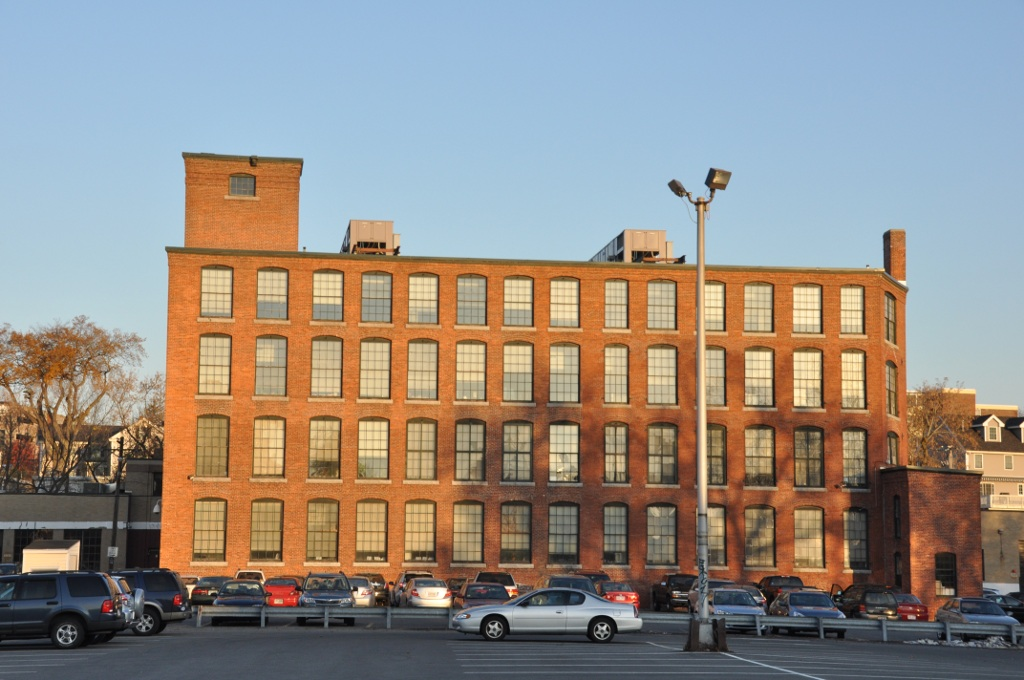

- Location within Massachusetts Location within the United States
- Location: Lowell, Massachusetts
- Coordinates: 42°38′37″N 71°18′16″W
- Built: 1909
- Architectural style: Early Commercial
- NRHP reference No.: 99001480
- Added to NRHP: December 9, 1999

The Musketaquid Mills is a historic mill building at 131 Davidson Street in Lowell, Massachusetts. It is the only mill building remaining on the east side of the Concord River, in the city's Belvidere section. The four story brick building was built in stages, beginning in 1909 with the construction of six bays of three stories. Between 1912 and 1925 it underwent two major expansions to reach its present four stories and fourteen bays. The building was used for textile production until 1980, and was used for storage for a time. It has been rehabilitated, and now houses Lowell's welfare services offices.

The building was listed on the National Register of Historic Places in 1999.

== See also ==
- Lowell mills
- National Register of Historic Places listings in Lowell, Massachusetts
