= Chelmsford Glass Works' Long House =

Historic residential building in Massachusetts, United States

- U.S. National Register of Historic Places
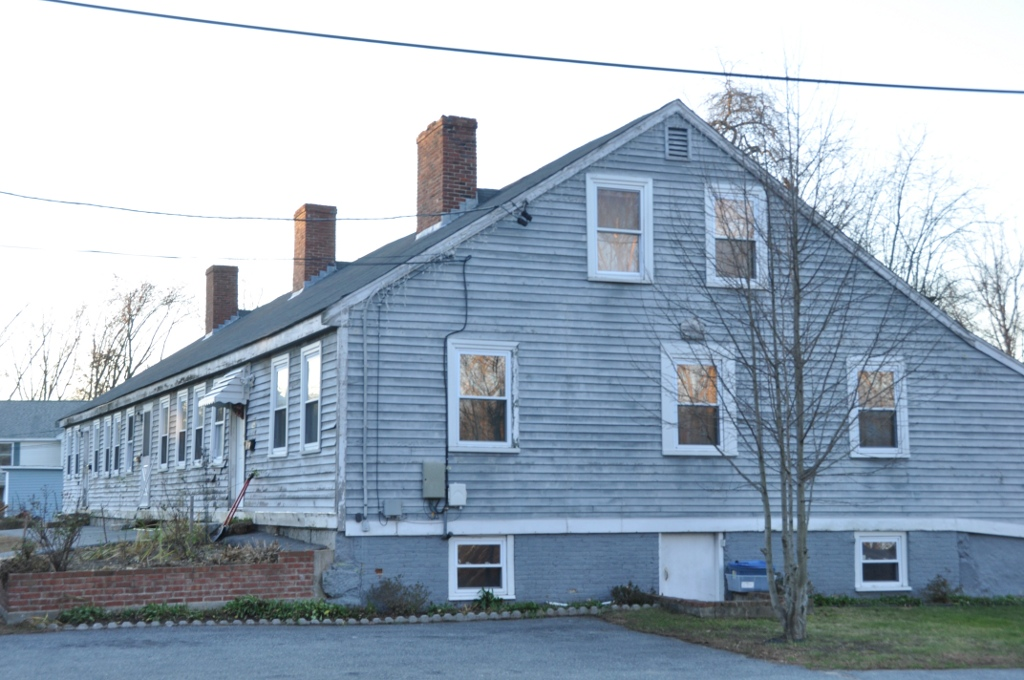

- Location within Massachusetts Location within the United States
- Location: Lowell, Massachusetts
- Coordinates: 42°38′2.2″N 71°20′57.16″W
- Built: 1802
- NRHP reference No.: 73000302
- Added to NRHP: January 25, 1973

The Chelmsford Glass Works' Long House is a historic tenement house at 139–141 Baldwin Street in Lowell, Massachusetts. The building, built in 1802 by the Chelmsford Glass Works to house some of its workers, is a series of 1–1/2 story Cape style wood-frame houses joined into a single structure. The building is one of the earliest industrial tenement structures built in the country. The glass works was established after the Middlesex Canal was opened, and needed to provide housing for its workers in what was then a somewhat rural location.

The building was listed on the National Register of Historic Places in 1973.

== See also ==
- National Register of Historic Places listings in Lowell, Massachusetts
