= Lowell Historic Preservation District =

Historic district in Massachusetts, United States

- U.S. National Register of Historic Places
- U.S. Historic district
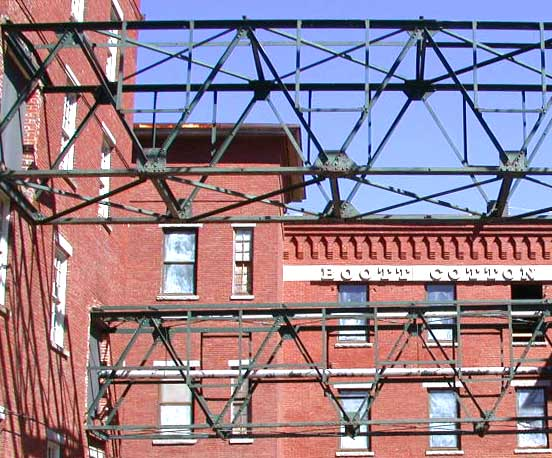

- Location within Massachusetts Location within the United States
- Location: Lowell, Massachusetts
- Coordinates: 42°38′48″N 71°18′29″W
- Area: 500 acres (200 ha)
- NRHP reference No.: 03000170
- Added to NRHP: January 19, 2001

The Lowell Historic Preservation District is a historic district created by the legislation establishing Lowell National Historic Park. The district encompasses an area of more than 500 acres (200 ha), including virtually all of the historically significant resources associated with the industrial history of the city of Lowell, Massachusetts. It includes the industrial mill complexes, worker housing areas, central business district, and civic heart of the city, as well as the water power infrastructure that powered the mills.

The district was listed on the National Register of Historic Places in 2001.

== See also ==
- National Register of Historic Places listings in Lowell, Massachusetts
