= Wilder Street Historic District =

Historic district in Massachusetts, United States

- U.S. National Register of Historic Places
- U.S. Historic district
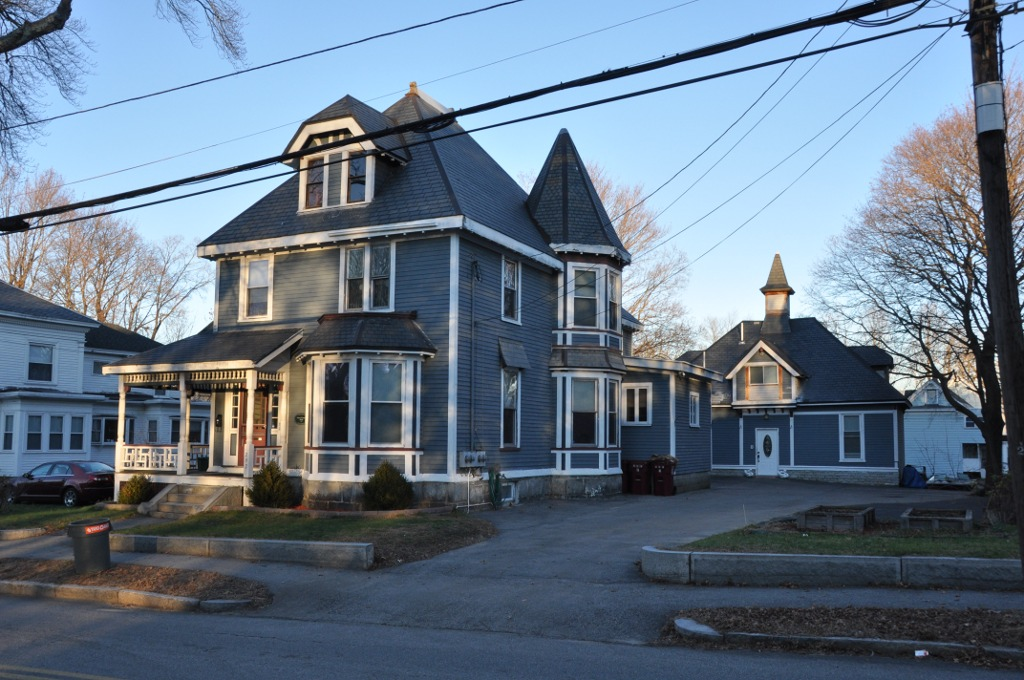

- Location within Massachusetts Location within the United States
- Location: 284–360 Wilder Street, Lowell, Massachusetts
- Coordinates: 42°38′11″N 71°19′56″W
- Built: 1875
- Architectural style: Colonial Revival, Second Empire, Italianate
- NRHP reference No.: 95000662
- Added to NRHP: May 26, 1995

The Wilder Street Historic District is a historic district in Lowell, Massachusetts. The section of Wilder Street between Westford Street and Branch Road contains a remarkable collection of large late 19th-century houses. About one dozen wealthy businessmen built elaborate houses in Queen Anne, Italianate, Stick, and Second Empire styles in this area, which was developed by its landowner, Charles Wilder, and it was considered one of the city's most fashionable addresses of the time.

The district was added to the National Register of Historic Places in 1995.

== See also ==
- National Register of Historic Places listings in Lowell, Massachusetts
