= Flagg-Coburn House =

Historic house in Massachusetts, United States

- U.S. National Register of Historic Places
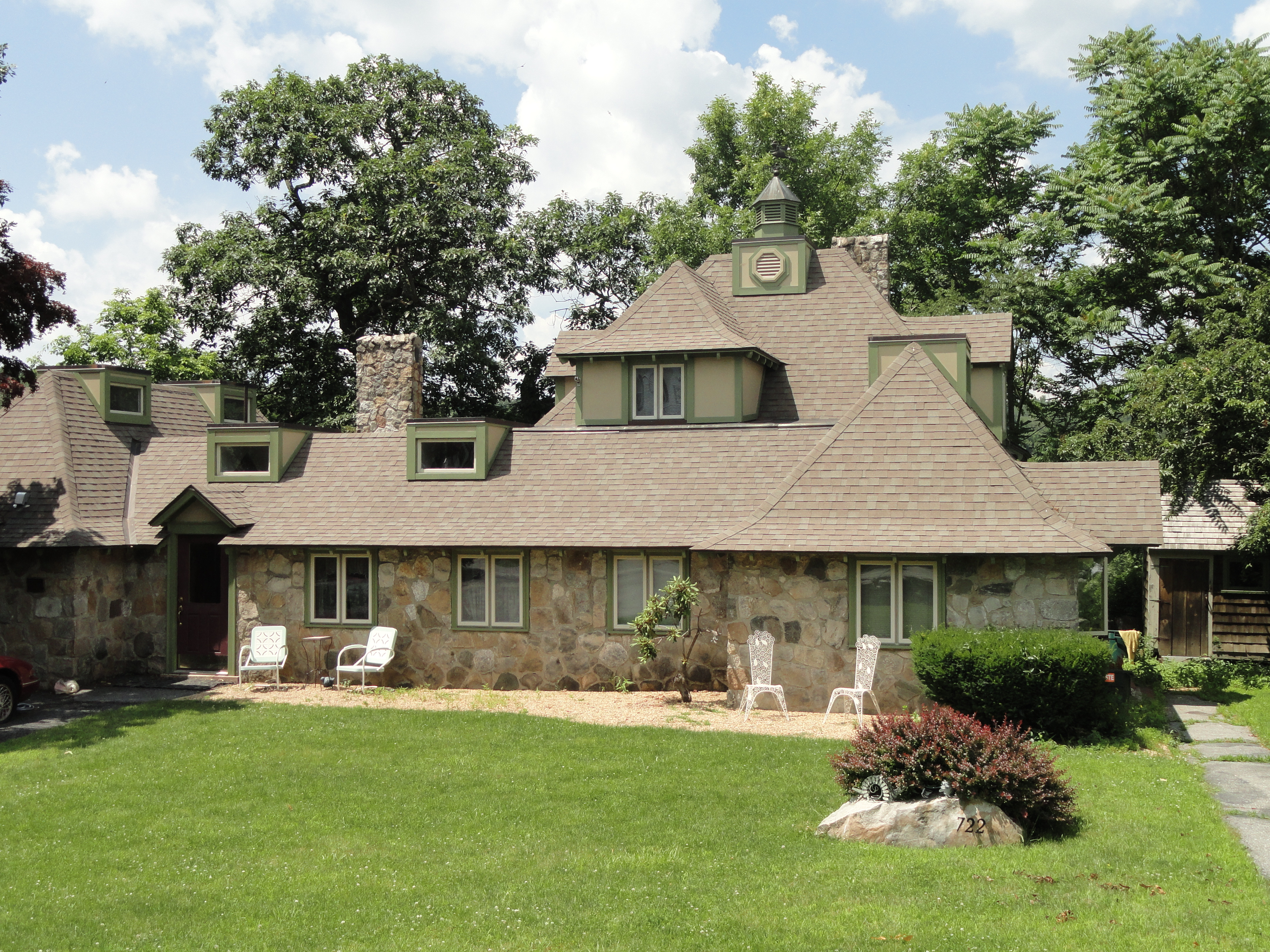

- Location within Massachusetts Location within the United States
- Location: 722 E. Merrimack St., Lowell, Massachusetts
- Coordinates: 42°38′45″N 71°17′14″W
- Built: 1926
- Architect: Ernest Flagg
- NRHP reference No.: 86001052
- Added to NRHP: May 15, 1986

The Flagg-Coburn House is a historic house at 722 E. Merrimack Street in Lowell, Massachusetts. Built in 1926 for a local industrialist, it is the first known example in New England of the distinctive residential work of New York City architect Ernest Flagg. It was listed on the National Register of Historic Places in 1986.

== Description and history ==
The Flagg-Coburn House is located in a residential area of eastern Lowell, set between East Merrimack Street to the south, and the Merrimack River to the north. It is a 1 1/2-story structure with an idiosyncratic plan and style. Its first-floor walls are composed of a rubblestone exterior laid around a core of concrete, and it is topped by a complex roof studded with dormers and projecting sections. Its interior layout is organized with the public rooms on the river side, and service rooms and bedrooms on the street side. Because the building lacks a basement (it was built on concrete slab poured over stone ledge), its infrastructure (heating systems and other utilities) are located in its westernmost wing.

The house was built in 1926 for the family of Frederick Coburn, a historian and artist from a prominent local industrial family. It was designed by Ernest Flagg, a New York-based architect, in a style he promoted as a cost-sensitive means for the design of homes for the lower and middle classes. The Coburns were interested in contemporary arts and crafts of the period, and the building is thus a somewhat anomalous design for the otherwise conventional designs for period houses in the finer neighborhoods of Lowell. The Coburns owned the house into the 1940s, and its once-rural setting has since been transformed into one of suburban character.

== See also ==
- National Register of Historic Places listings in Lowell, Massachusetts
