= Brown–Maynard House =

Historic house in Massachusetts, United States

- U.S. National Register of Historic Places
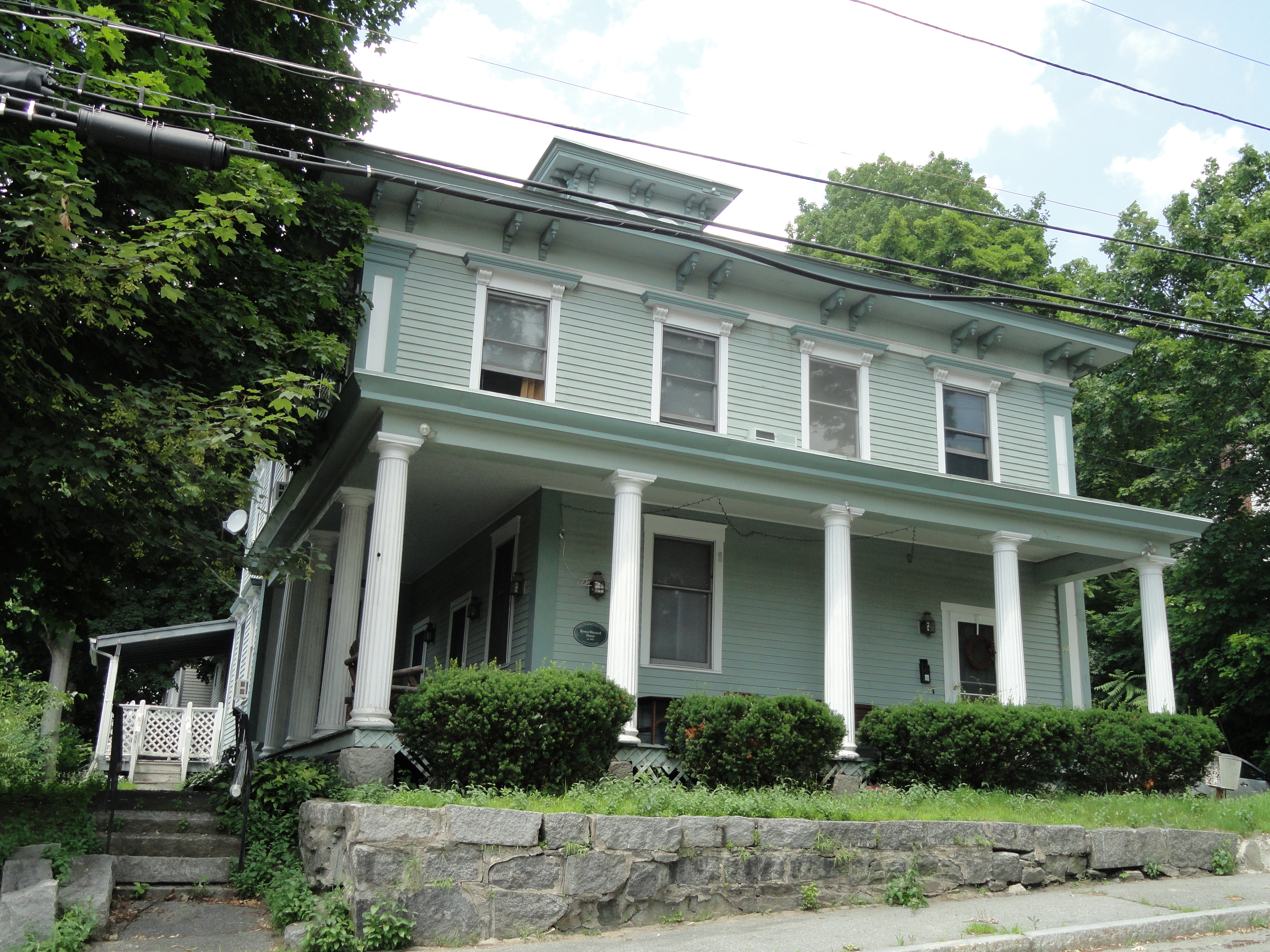

- Location within Massachusetts
- Location: 84 Tenth Street, Lowell, Massachusetts
- Coordinates: 42°39′16″N 71°17′58″W
- Built: 1852
- Architectural style: Italianate architecture
- NRHP reference No.: 86001460
- Added to NRHP: July 2, 1986

The Brown–Maynard House is a historic house in Lowell, Massachusetts.

== Description and history ==
It is a two-story wood-frame structure, with a low-pitch hip roof topped by a cupola, clapboard siding, and a porch that wraps around the front and side of the house. The cupola is distinguished by tripled narrow round-arch windows on each side, and a bracketed roofline matching that of the main roof. The building's corners have paneled pilasters, and the windows are topped by decorative woodwork. The house was built c. 1852, probably for Samuel Brown, a supervisor at the Boott Mills, and is a fine local example of Italianate architecture.

The house was listed on the National Register of Historic Places on July 2, 1986.

== See also ==
- National Register of Historic Places listings in Lowell, Massachusetts
