= Grace Universalist Church =

Historic church in Massachusetts, United States

- U.S. National Register of Historic Places
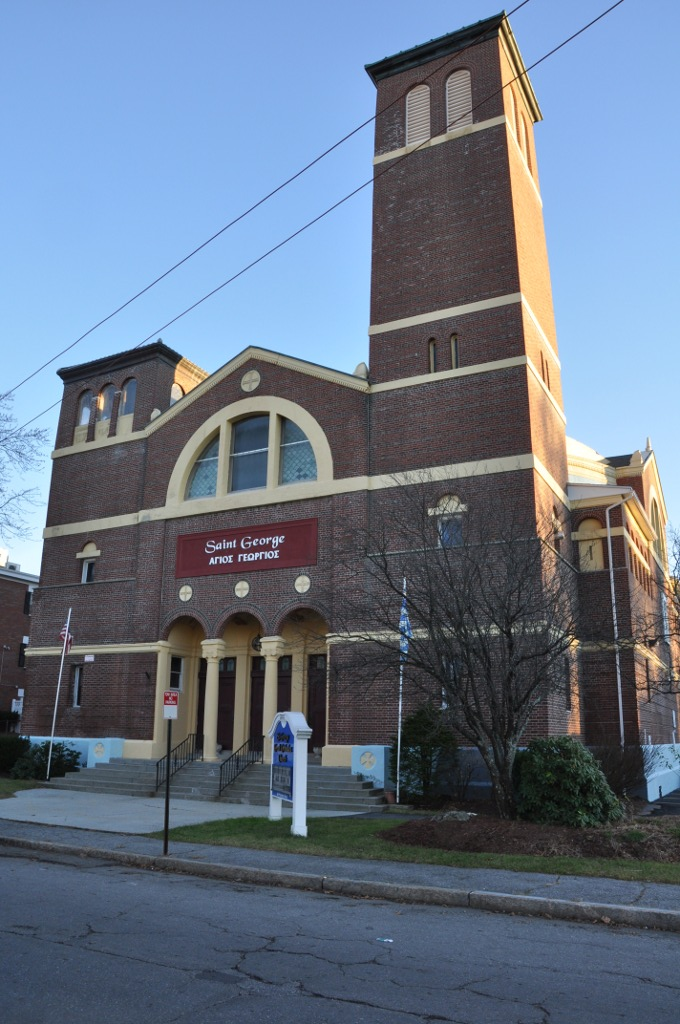

- Location within Massachusetts Location within the United States
- Location: 44 Princeton Boulevard; Lowell, Massachusetts
- Coordinates: 42°38′07″N 71°19′58″W
- Built: 1895-6
- NRHP reference No.: 11000069
- Added to NRHP: March 11, 2011

Grace Universalist Church is a historic church building at 44 Princeton Boulevard in Lowell, Massachusetts. Built in 1896, the building housed a Universalist congregation until 1973, when it was sold to a Greek Orthodox congregation. It is now known as the St. George Hellenic Orthodox Church. The building is a 2 1/2-story brick structure, with an eclectic mix of Romanesque, Beaux Arts, and Classical Revival details. Its single most notable feature is a 70-foot (21 m) masonry dome designed by Rafael Guastavino Sr. and supervised by Rafael Guastavino Jr. in 1895.

The church is significant as a very early tile vaulted dome built by the immigrant architects Rafael Guastavino Sr. and Jr. in the United States. The church building was listed on the National Register of Historic Places in 2011.

== See also ==
- National Register of Historic Places listings in Lowell, Massachusetts
- National Register of Historic Places listings in Middlesex County, Massachusetts
