= Varnum Building =

- U.S. National Register of Historic Places
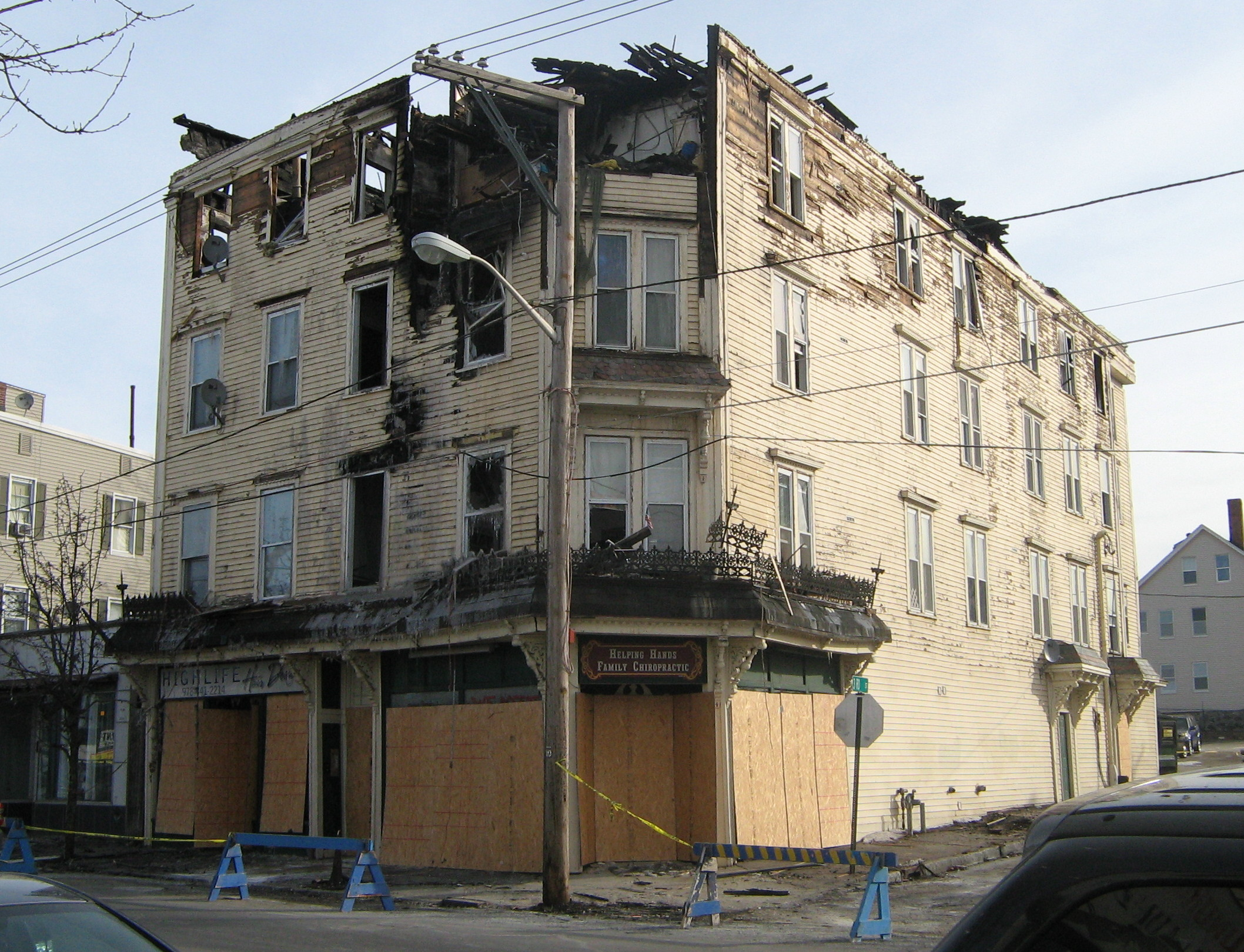
- A photo of the building after the fire

- Location within Massachusetts Location within the United States
- Location: 401–405 Bridge Street, Lowell, Massachusetts
- Coordinates: 42°39′1″N 71°18′14″W
- Built: 1882
- Architectural style: Queen Anne
- NRHP reference No.: 88002752
- Added to NRHP: December 19, 1988

The Varnum Building was a historic mixed-use commercial and residential building in Lowell, Massachusetts. It was a four-story wood-frame structure with an angled front at the corner of Bridge and Third Streets, topped by a square cupola with bellcast pyramidal roof. It was built in 1882 by Leavitt and Daniel Varnum, who operated an insurance business on the premises, and was one of the oldest commercial buildings on Bridge Street. It was added to the National Register of Historic Places in 1988.

The building was heavily damaged in an electrically ignited fire on the morning of February 12, 2010, and was declared a total loss. It was demolished on February 18, 2010.

== See also ==
- National Register of Historic Places listings in Lowell, Massachusetts
