= Saint Joseph's Roman Catholic College for Boys =

United States historic school building in Lowell, Massachusetts

- U.S. National Register of Historic Places
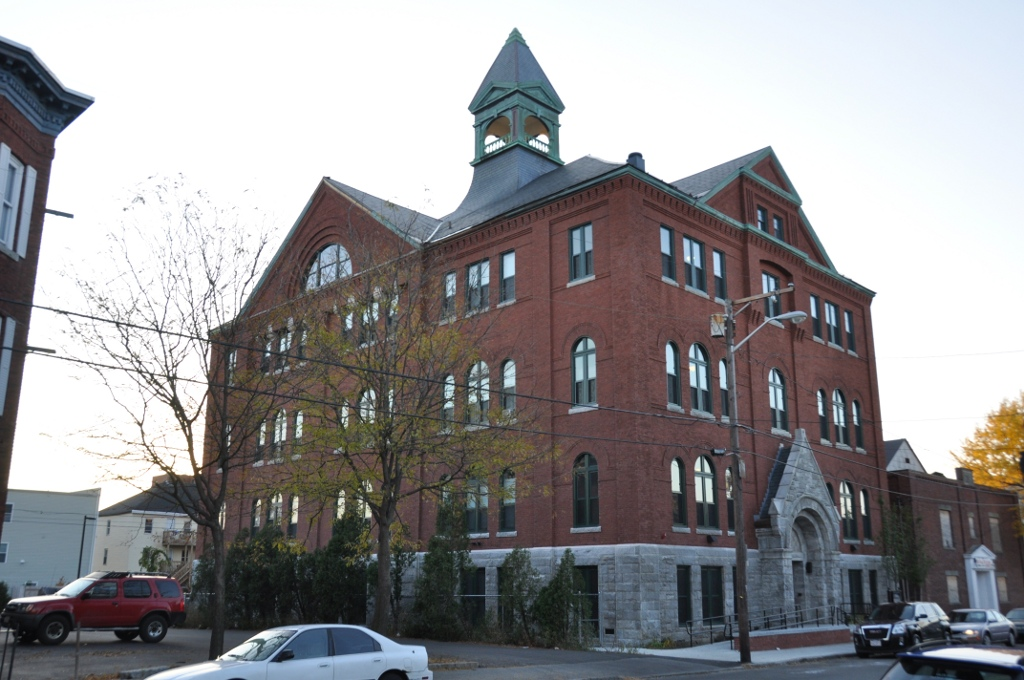

- Location within Massachusetts Location within the United States
- Location: Lowell, Massachusetts
- Coordinates: 42°38′56″N 71°19′14″W
- Built: 1892
- Architect: Patrick W. Ford
- Architectural style: Romanesque Revival
- NRHP reference No.: 02000789
- Added to NRHP: July 19, 2002

Saint Joseph's Roman Catholic College for Boys, also known as Saint Joseph's High School, is a historic school building at 760 Merrimack Street in Lowell, Massachusetts. The three-story brick Romanesque Revival building was built in 1892 to a design by Irish-American church architect Patrick W. Ford. The school was one of a number of Roman Catholic institutions built to serve Lowell's burgeoning French-American community, a significant portion of which had settled in "The Acre", as the neighborhood is known. In 1991 the school was merged with other local Catholic schools to form the Lowell Catholic High School. The diocese sold the building in 1997 to a local nonprofit, which converted it to residential use.

The building was listed on the National Register of Historic Places in 2010.

== See also ==
- National Register of Historic Places listings in Lowell, Massachusetts
- National Register of Historic Places listings in Middlesex County, Massachusetts
