= Tyler Park Historic District =

Historic district in Massachusetts, United States

- U.S. National Register of Historic Places
- U.S. Historic district
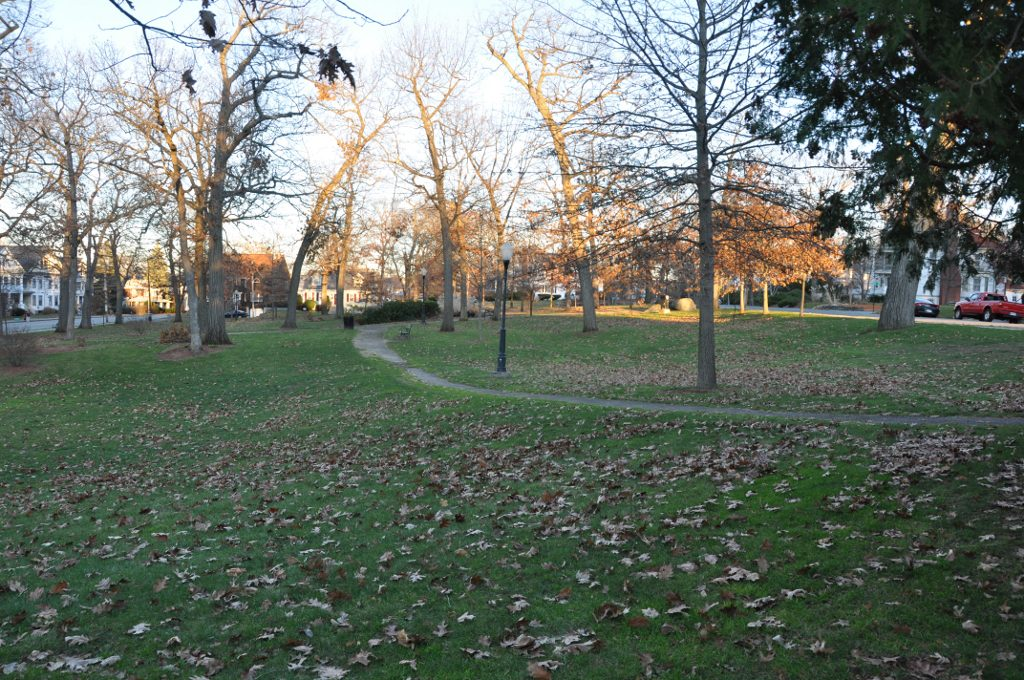

- Location within Massachusetts Location within the United States
- Location: Lowell, Massachusetts
- Coordinates: 42°37′52″N 71°20′27″W
- Architect: Eliot, Charles
- Architectural style: Colonial Revival, Bungalow/Craftsman, Queen Anne
- NRHP reference No.: 89001056
- Added to NRHP: August 17, 1989

The Tyler Park Historic District encompasses a planned residential development in western Lowell, Massachusetts. The development was designed by Olmsted, Olmsted and Eliot, and is centered on Tyler Park; this area is the only Olmsted design in the city. It is roughly bounded by Princeton, Foster, and Pine Streets. Except for a few early houses that predate the subdivision, the area was built out between 1888 and 1936, and reflect the architectural styles popular in the period.

The district was listed on the National Register of Historic Places in 1989.

== See also ==
- National Register of Historic Places listings in Lowell, Massachusetts
