= Varnum School =

- U.S. National Register of Historic Places
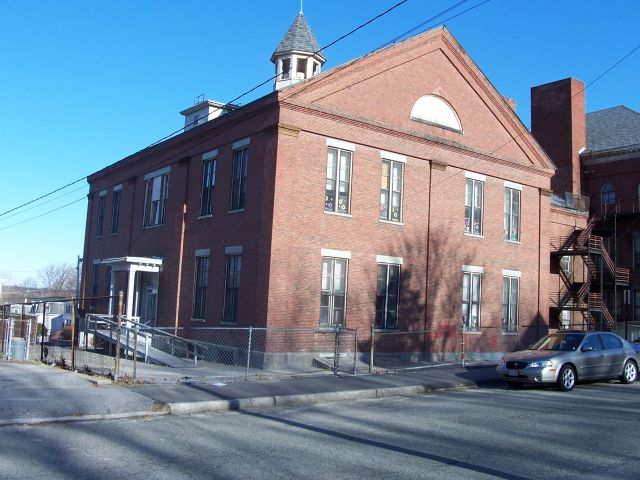
- The 1857 portion of the school

- Location within Massachusetts Location within the United States
- Location: 103 Sixth Street, Lowell, Massachusetts
- Coordinates: 42°39′4″N 71°17′58″W
- Area: 1.24 acres (0.50 ha)
- Built: 1857
- Architect: Arthur M. Burtt
- Architectural style: Greek Revival, Classical Revival
- NRHP reference No.: 94001591
- Added to NRHP: January 24, 1995

The Varnum School is a historic former school building in Lowell, Massachusetts. The Greek Revival building was built in 1857, and was the first school built in the city's Centralville section after it was annexed to the city in 1851. The building was altered with a minor addition added in 1886, and a substantial Classical Revival addition was made in 1896. The building was listed on the National Register of Historic Places in 1995. Vacant since the 2000s, it is now owned by a developer, and is slated for conversion to housing units.

== Description and history ==
The Varnum School building is set on the south side of Sixth Street, between Myrtle and Beech Streets in the city's Centralville neighborhood, located just across the Merrimack River from its central business district. It is a three-story brick structure, with two large sections joined by a smaller one. The section facing the street is a Classical Revival structure, three stories high, with a hip roof and a projecting gable-roofed center section. Its corners are articulated by brick pilasters with stone capitals, and its windows have granite sills and lintels. The third-floor windows are round-arched, while the others are regular sash. The cornice and the pedimented gable are modillioned. This section was built in 1896 to a design by Arthur M. Burtt.

Behind this section is a narrow two-story section, which joins the front section to the school's original 1857 structure, a two-story gable-roofed structure with Greek Revival styling. The slate roof is pierced by several dormers, and is topped by a cupola. A south-facing entrance is sheltered by a flat-roof portico supported by square columns. The gabled side elevations are divided by pilasters at the corners and in the center, and the gable end is fully pedimented, with a half-round window at the center.

The Centralville area was originally part of Dracut, but its proximity to Lowell's business and industrial centers brought it economically and socially closer to that community. In 1851 the area was annexed to the city. A school was built near this site in the 1830s by Joseph Bradley Varnum and his son, Benjamin Franklin Varnum, who owned a boarding house on the site of this building. When built in 1857, this school was the city's first elementary school in which students were separated by grade. Population growth in the area prompted the 1886 addition of two classrooms (now the center connecting section), and the eight-room 1897 addition, which is now the dominant part of the building.

The building was used as a school into the 2000s. The city sold it to a private developer, who is planning a residential conversion.

== See also ==
- National Register of Historic Places listings in Lowell, Massachusetts
