= South Common Historic District =

Historic district in Massachusetts, United States

- U.S. National Register of Historic Places
- U.S. Historic district
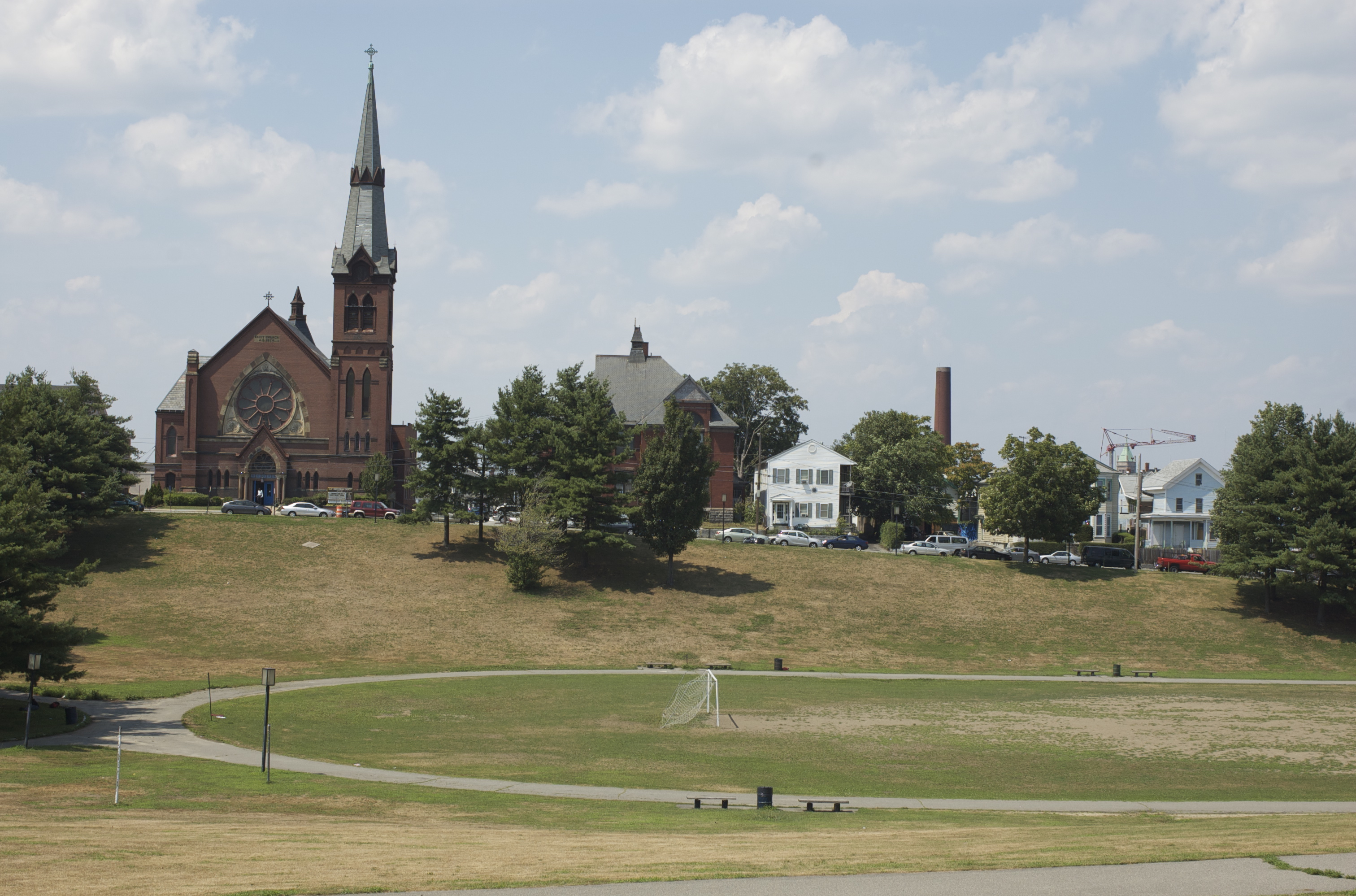
- Buildings on Summer Street, viewed from the common

- Location within Massachusetts Location within the United States
- Location: Lowell, Massachusetts
- Coordinates: 42°38′13″N 71°18′41″W
- Architect: Multiple
- Architectural style: Late Gothic Revival, Late Victorian
- NRHP reference No.: 82001993
- Added to NRHP: August 10, 1982

The South Common Historic District of Lowell, Massachusetts, encompasses the city's South Common and the various public, religious, and private residential buildings that flank its borders. The South Common, about 22.5 acres (9.1 ha) in size, was purchased by the city in 1845 in an auction by the Proprietors of Locks and Canals, who owned much of the city's industrial area. Although the common was landscaped, it was not apparently done so to a plan. It quickly became lined with fashionable residences, and several iconic public buildings, including the 1850 courthouse, a Romantic Revival structure designed by Ammi Young, and a series of Gothic Revival churches. Highland Avenue was built out with a series of fine Italianate houses.

Per the January, 1981 Massachusetts Historic Commission application, in the 1850s a land owner living on the east side of the proposed South Common, Patrick Manice, refused to sell his property to the City of Lowell. The city then enclosed his property, with he and his family within with a wooden fence. Friends supported Manice by slipping food through the slats of the fence. He surrendered his house in 1856 for $3500, and the parcel was subsequently nicknamed "Manice's Spite". In 1905, the city built a running track a baseball field and a children's gymnasium on the common as a 'city experiment'.

In addition to the common, the historic district encompasses many of the surrounding buildings including:
7 residential buildings on Highland Street,
7 properties on Summer Street including the Eliot Church,
Eliot School on Favor Street,
Hood's Laboratory (Thorndike Street) - Originally built to produce 'Hood's Sarsaparilla',
the former Lowell Jail (Thorndike Street) later housing Keith Academy Catholic High School,
St. John's Church (Gorham Street),
St. Peter's Church and Rectory (Gorham Street) and,
the Middlesex County Courthouse (Gorham Street).

The district was added to the National Register of Historic Places in 1982.

== See also ==
- National Register of Historic Places listings in Lowell, Massachusetts
