= Andover Street Historic District =

Historic district in Massachusetts, United States

- U.S. National Register of Historic Places
- U.S. Historic district
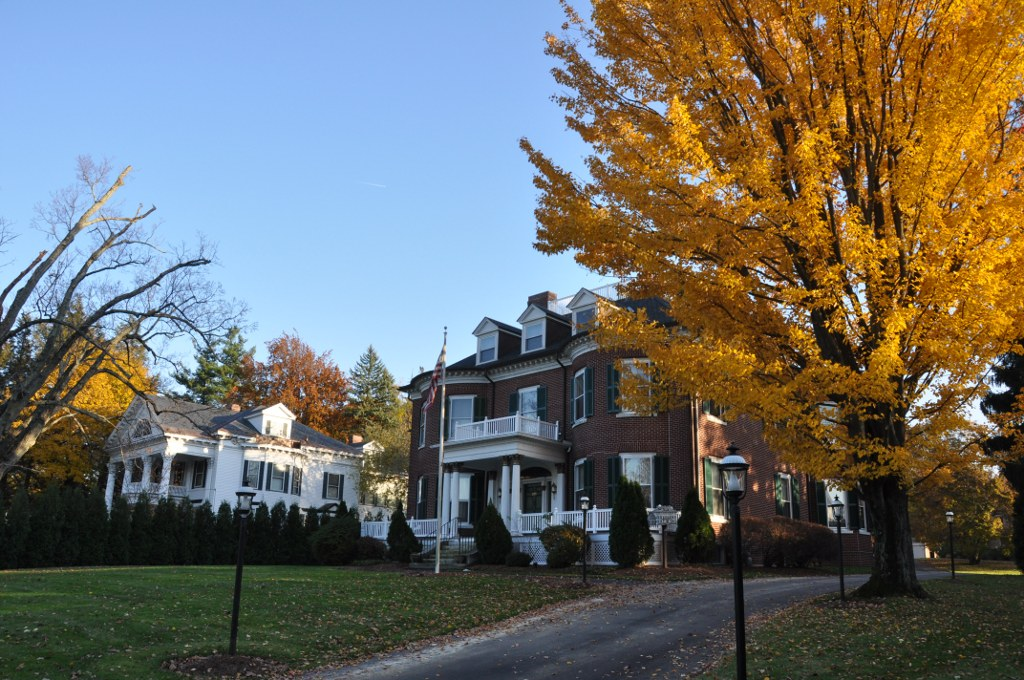

- Location within Massachusetts Location within the United States
- Location: Lowell, Massachusetts
- Coordinates: 42°38′37″N 71°17′11″W
- Area: 70.6 acres (28.6 ha)
- Built: 1802
- Architect: Clark, Edwin R.; Stickney, Frederick W.
- Architectural style: Varied
- NRHP reference No.: 00000568
- Added to NRHP: June 2, 2000

The Andover Street Historic District is a linear residential historic district in the Belvidere neighborhood of eastern Lowell, Massachusetts. The district encompasses large, fashionable houses and estates that were built between the 1860s and the 1930s. It includes properties at 245—834 Andover Street, and at 569 and 579 East Merrimack Street. The district was listed on the National Register of Historic Places in 2000.

== Description and history ==
Andover Street, designated Massachusetts Route 133, is the major roadway extending eastward from downtown Lowell toward Andover in a roughly straight line. To its north, East Merrimack Street also runs east–west, but follows the contours of the Merrimack River, which lies to its north, until it bends south and ends at a junction with Andover Street in far eastern Lowell. At one stretch the two roads are sufficiently close to one another that there are single properties abutting both of them. The district extends along this piece of road, from Andover Street's junction with Nesmith Street to the Tewksbury line. It is lined with generously sized lots, with house often set back 20 to 30 feet (6.1 to 9.1 m). Lot size tend to increase in size further east, reflecting grander properties that were developed later.

In the first major phase of the area's growth, between the 1860s and 1890s, Italianate and Queen Anne Victorian houses were built. These were followed from the 1890s the 1930s by a series of high quality Colonial Revival homes. Most of the later properties are of smaller size than the earlier buildings, although the quality of workmanship remained high. The oldest properties in the district are the Federal-style Harry F. Worcester House (658 Andover Street, built 1802) and The Manse at 282 Andover Street, a stone Gothic Revival structure built c. 1847. The Elijah Read House at 578 Andover Street is said to be the finest Italianate house in the area.

== See also ==
- National Register of Historic Places listings in Middlesex County, Massachusetts
