= Line shaft =

Rotating shaft historically used for power transmission

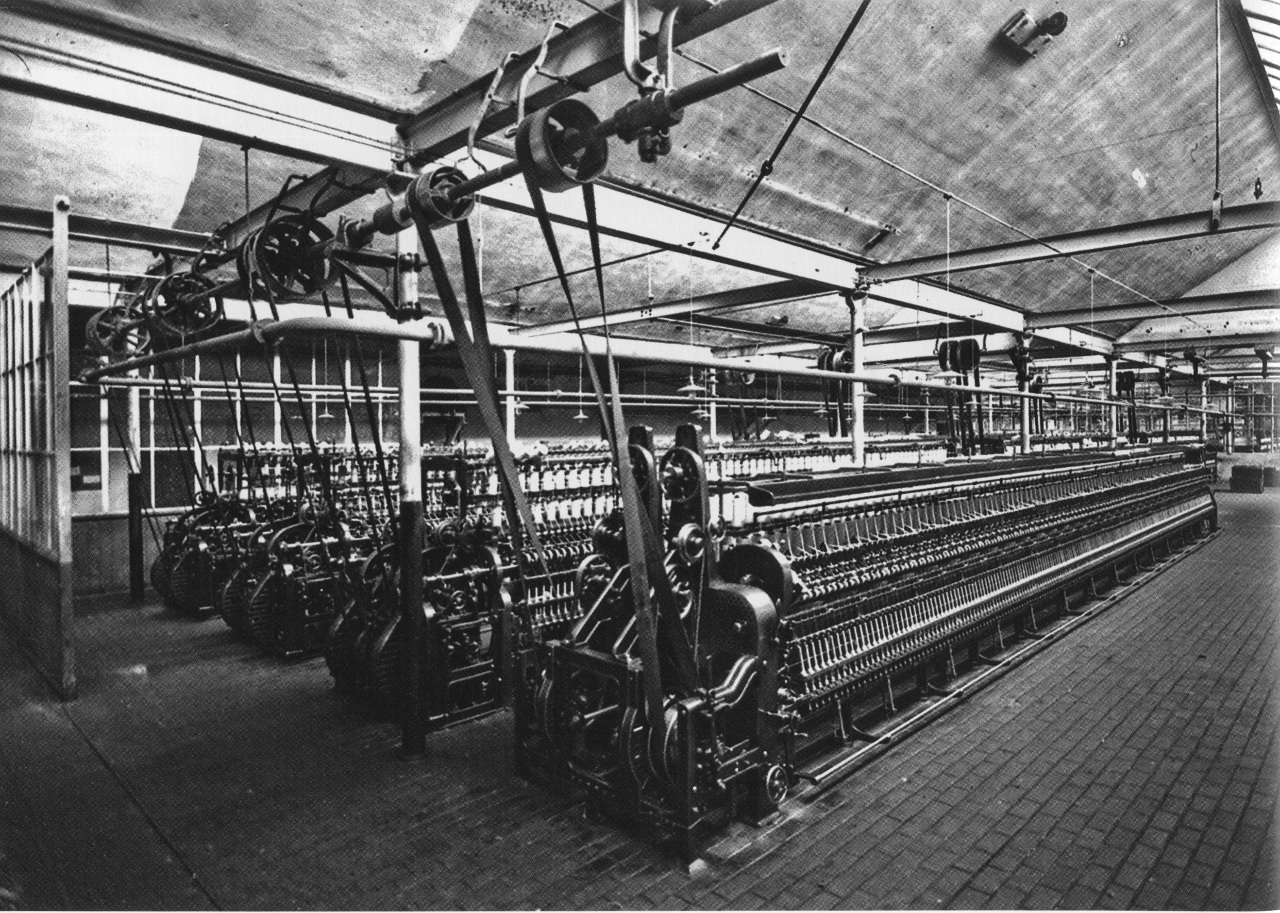
Four wool spinning machines driven by belts from an overhead lineshaft (Leipzig, Germany, circa 1925)

The belt drives of the Mueller Mill, model and reality, in motion

A line shaft or millworks is a power-driven rotating shaft for power transmission within factories and industrial complexes. They were used extensively from the Industrial Revolution until the early 20th century. Prior to the widespread use of electric motors small enough to be connected directly to each piece of machinery, line shafting was used to distribute power from a large central power source to machinery transmitted through branching belts or gear drives. The central power source could be a water wheel, turbine, windmill, animal power, or a steam engine. Power was distributed from the shaft to the machinery by a system of belts, pulleys and gears known as millworks.

== Operation ==
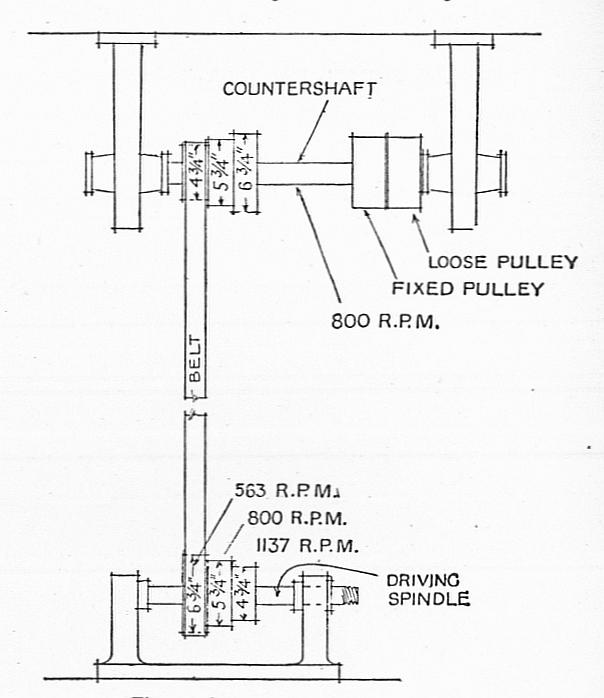
Variable-speed belt drive for a lathe. The fixed pulley on the upper shaft is driven at constant speed by a belt from the power source. The loose pulley (idler) allows the machine to be stopped in isolation – necessary for changing speed. The stepped pulleys (left) provide three drive speeds for the machine tool (not shown), depending on which pair of pulleys is connected by the belt.

From turbine to line shaft at Suffolk Mills in Lowell, Massachusetts

From line shaft to power looms at Boott Mills in Lowell, Massachusetts

External image
- Video of line shaft operating in a workshop.

A typical line shaft would be suspended from the ceiling of one area and would run the length of that area. One pulley on the shaft would receive the power from a parent line shaft elsewhere in the building. The other pulleys would supply power to pulleys on each individual machine or to subsequent line shafts. In manufacturing where there were a large number of machines performing the same tasks, the design of the system was fairly regular and repeated. In other applications such as machine and wood shops where there was a variety of machines with different orientations and power requirements, the system would appear erratic and inconsistent with many different shafting directions and pulley sizes. Shafts were usually horizontal and overhead but occasionally were vertical and could be underground. Shafts were usually rigid steel, made up of several parts bolted together at flanges. The shafts were suspended by hangers with bearings at certain intervals of length. The distance depended on the weight of the shaft and the number of pulleys. The shafts had to be kept aligned or the stress would overheat the bearings and could break the shaft. The bearings were usually friction type and had to be kept lubricated. Pulley lubricator employees were required in order to ensure that the bearings did not freeze or malfunction.

In the earliest applications power was transmitted between pulleys using loops of rope on grooved pulleys. This method is extremely rare today, dating mostly from the 18th century. Flat belts on flat pulleys or drums were the most common method during the 19th and early 20th centuries. The belts were generally tanned leather or cotton duck impregnated with rubber. Leather belts were fastened in loops with rawhide or wire lacing, lap joints and glue, or one of several types of steel fasteners. Cotton duck belts usually used metal fasteners or were melted together with heat. The leather belts were run with the hair side against the pulleys for best traction. The belts needed periodic cleaning and conditioning to keep them in good condition. Belts were often twisted 180 degrees per leg and reversed on the receiving pulley to cause the second shaft to rotate in the opposite direction.

Pulleys were constructed of wood, iron, steel or a combination thereof. Varying sizes of pulleys were used in conjunction to change the speed of rotation. For example, a 40" pulley at 100 rpm would turn a 20" pulley at 200 rpm. Pulleys solidly attached ("fast") to the shaft could be combined with adjacent pulleys that turned freely ("loose") on the shaft (idlers). In this configuration the belt could be maneuvered onto the idler to stop power transmission or onto the solid pulley to convey the power. This arrangement was often used near machines to provide a means of shutting the machine off when not in use. Usually at the last belt feeding power to a machine, a pair of stepped pulleys could be used to give a variety of speed settings for the machine.

Occasionally gears were used between shafts to change speed rather than belts and different-sized pulleys, but this seems to have been relatively uncommon.

== History ==
Early versions of line shafts date back into the 18th century, but they were in widespread use in the late 19th century with industrialization. Line shafts were widely used in manufacturing, woodworking shops, machine shops, saw mills and grist mills.

In 1828 in Lowell, Massachusetts, Paul Moody substituted leather belting for metal gearing to transfer power from the main shaft running from a water wheel. This innovation quickly spread in the U.S.

Flat-belt drive systems became popular in the UK from the 1870s, with the firms of J & E Wood and W & J Galloway & Sons prominent in their introduction. Both of these firms manufactured stationary steam engines and the continuing demand for more power and reliability could be met not merely by improved engine technology but also improved methods of transferring power from the engines to the looms and similar machinery which they were intended to service. The use of flat belts was already common in the US but rare in Britain until this time. The advantages included less noise and less wasted energy in the friction losses inherent in the previously common drive shafts and their associated gearing. Also, maintenance was simpler and cheaper, and it was a more convenient method for the arrangement of power drives such that if one part were to fail then it would not cause loss of power to all sections of a factory or mill. These systems were in turn superseded in popularity by rope drive methods.

Near the end of the 19th century some factories had a mile or more of line shafts in a single building.

In order to provide power for small shops and light industry, specially constructed "power buildings" were constructed. Power buildings used a central steam engine and distributed power through line shafts to all the leased rooms. Power buildings continued to be built in the early days of electrification, still using line shafts but driven by an electric motor.

As some factories grew too large and complex to be powered by a single steam engine, a system of "sub divided" power came into use. This was also important when a wide range of speed control was necessary for a sensitive operation such as wire drawing or hammering iron. Under sub divided power, steam was piped from a central boiler to smaller steam engines located where needed. However, small steam engines were much less efficient than large ones. The Baldwin Locomotive Works 63-acre site changed to sub divided power, then because of the inefficiency converted to group drive with several large steam engines driving the line shafts. Eventually Baldwin converted to electric drive, with a substantial saving in labor and building space.

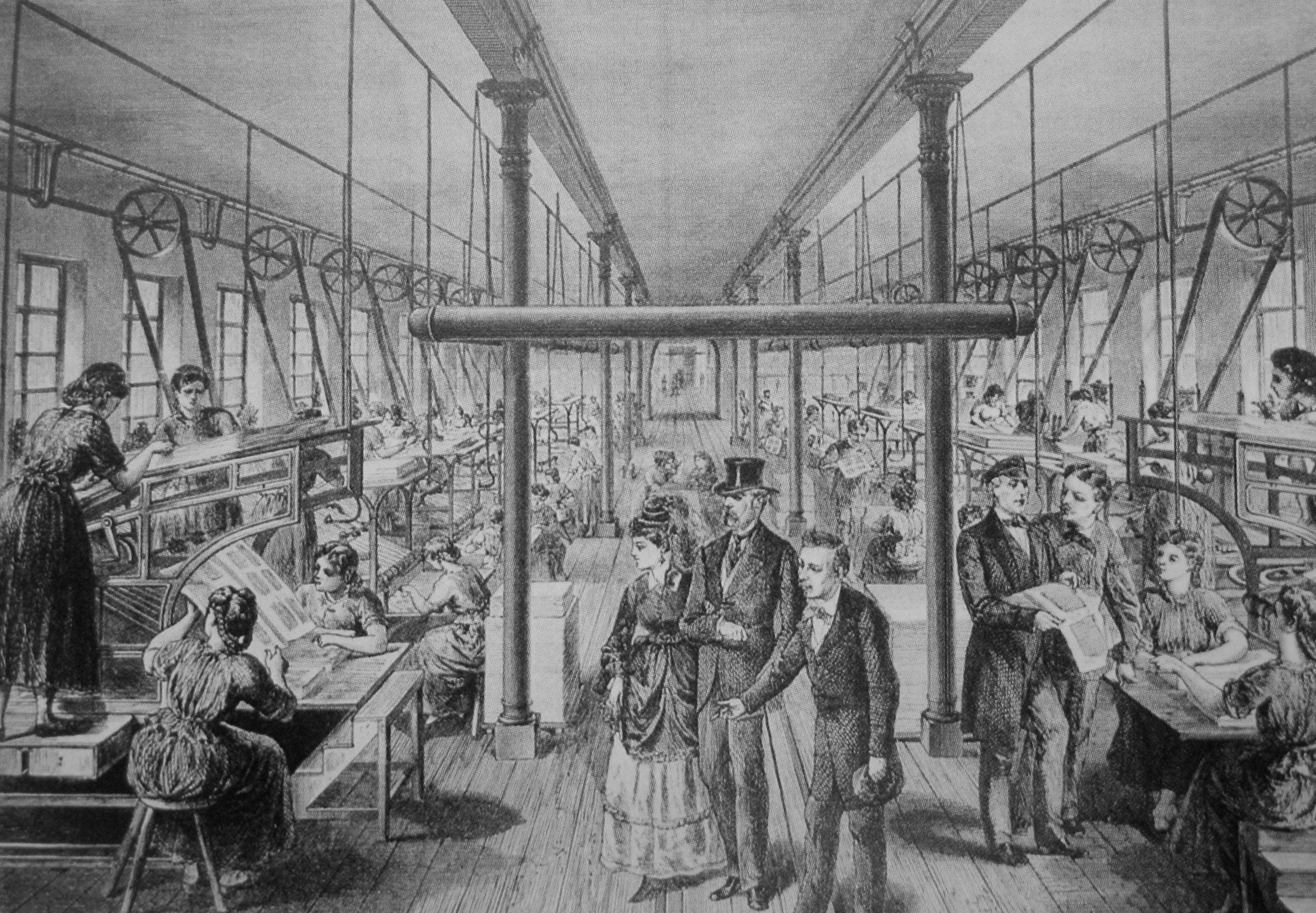
Printing presses in 1870

With factory electrification in the early 1900s, many line shafts began converting to electric drive. In early factory electrification only large motors were available, so new factories installed a large motor to drive line shafting and millwork. After 1900 smaller industrial motors became available and most new installations used individual electric drives.

Steam turbine powered line shafts were commonly used to drive paper machines for speed control reasons until economical methods for precision electric motor speed control became available in the 1980s; since then many have been replaced with sectional electric drives. Economical variable speed control using electric motors was made possible by silicon controlled rectifiers (SCRs) to produce direct current and variable frequency drives using inverters to change DC back to AC at the frequency required for the desired speed.

Most systems were out of service by the mid-20th century and relatively few remain in the 21st century, even fewer in their original location and configuration.

== Disadvantages and alternatives ==
=== Disadvantages ===
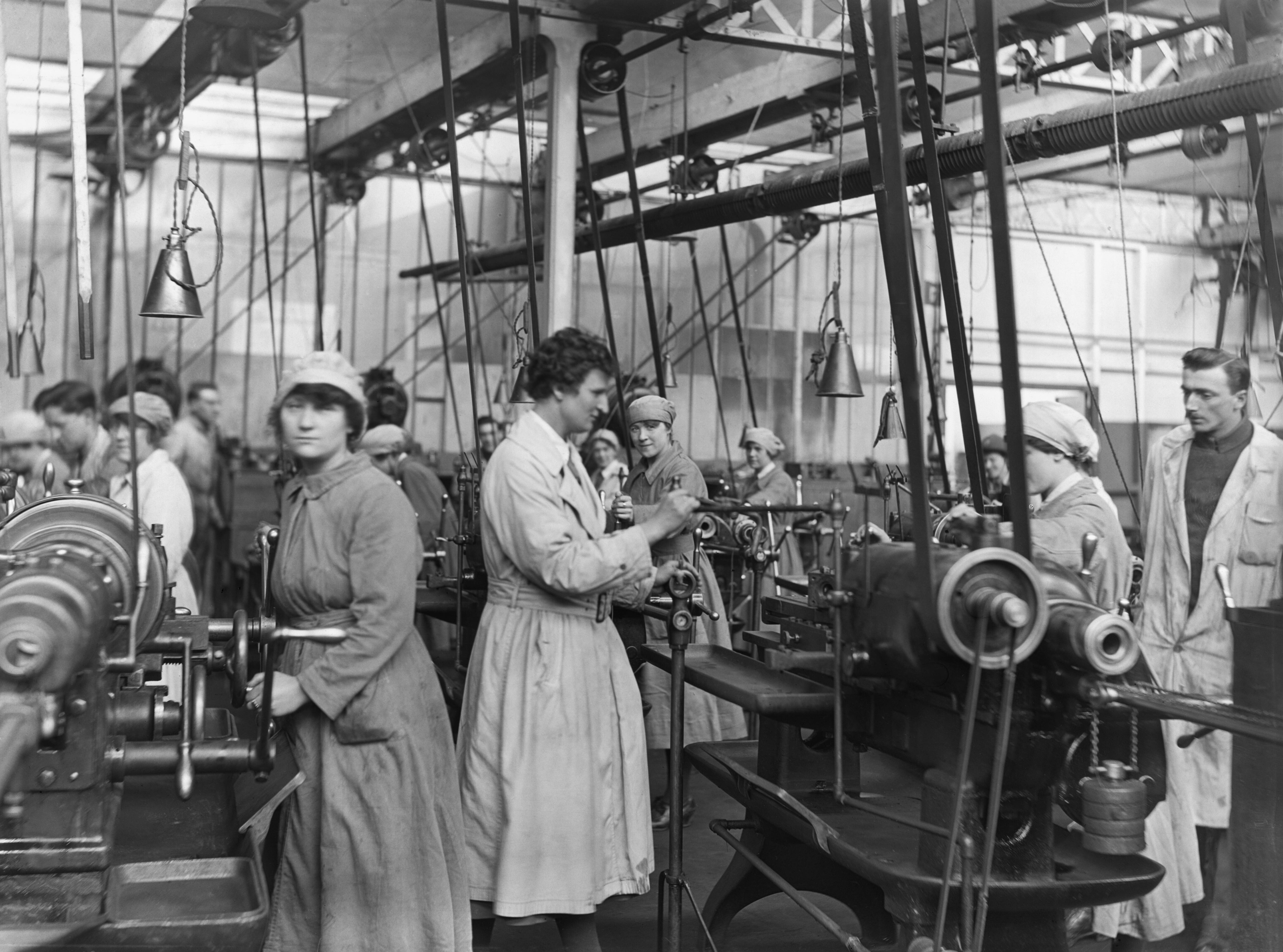
A line shaft system in a machine shop in France, 1919. The ubiquitous belts posed an entanglement hazard to the operators, so machinists with long hair are wearing hats to reduce the risk of injuries.

Compared to individual electric motor or unit drive, line shafts have the following disadvantages:

- Power loss with line shafts varied widely and was typically 25% and often much higher; however, using roller bearings and good quality lubrication could minimize losses. Roller and spherical bearings gained acceptance in the decade before electrification of factories began.
- Continuous noise
- Maintenance costs were higher.
- The systems were more dangerous.
- Down time due to mechanical problems was higher.
- It was not as easy to change speed.
- Factory layout was designed around access to the line shafts, not in the most efficient manner for the work flow.
- The line shafts and millwork took up a lot of space; Baldwin Locomotive Works estimated 40% more than electric drive.
- The shafts and belting were in the way of lighting, overhead cranes and ventilation ducts.
- Alignment of the system was critical and problematic for long shafts that were subject to expansion and contraction, settling and vibration.
- The belting shed dust and kept it continuously circulating in the air.
- Oil dripped from the overhead shafting.

Firms switching to electric power showed significantly less employee sick time, and, using the same equipment, showed significant increases in production. Writing in 1909, James Hobart said that "We can scarcely step into a shop or factory of any description without encountering a mass of belts which seem at first to monopolize every nook in the building and leave little or no room for anything else."

=== Historical alternatives to line shafts ===
To overcome the distance and friction limitations of line shafts, wire rope systems were developed in the late 19th century. Wire rope operated at higher velocities than line shafts and were a practical means of transmitting mechanical power for a distance of a few miles or kilometers. They used widely spaced, large diameter wheels and had much lower friction loss than line shafts, and had one-tenth the initial cost.

To supply small scale power that was impractical for individual steam engines, central station hydraulic systems were developed. Hydraulic power was used to operate cranes and other machinery in British ports and elsewhere in Europe. The largest hydraulic system was in London. Hydraulic power was used extensively in Bessemer steel production.

There were also some central stations providing pneumatic power in the late 19th century.

== Early examples ==
In an early example, Jedediah Strutt's water-powered cotton mill, North Mill in Belper, built in 1776, all the power to operate the machinery came from an 18-foot (5.5 m) water wheel.

=== Original systems ===
==== United Kingdom ====
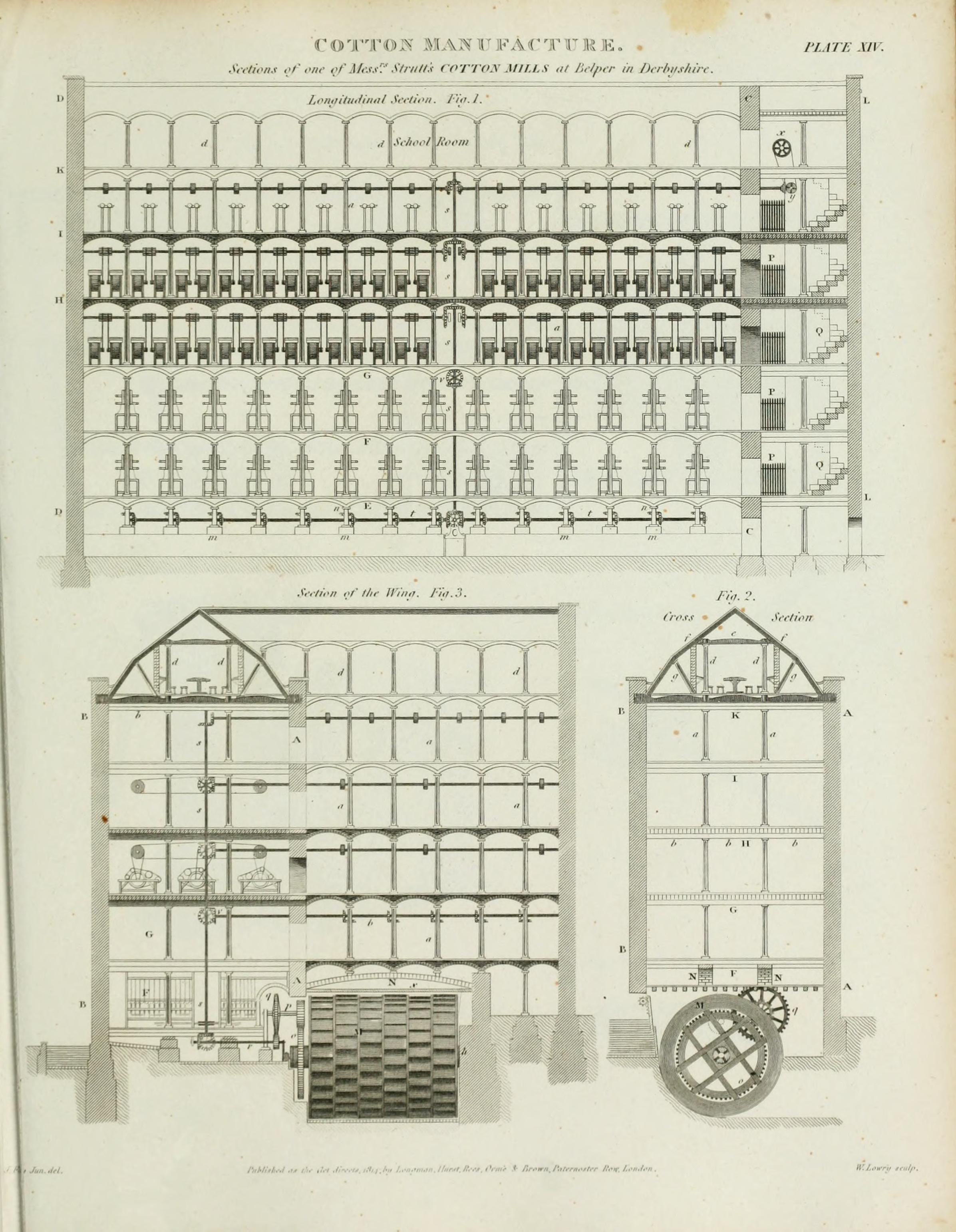
Jedediah Strutt, North Mill at Belper in 1819, showing vertical shaft leading from the 18 feet (5.5 m) waterwheel, to horizontal drive shafts running the length of each floor

- Elan Valley — non-operable lineshaft still in situ in old workshops, now in use as visitor centre
- Ellenroad Ring Mill — line shafting from a 6 hp National Oil Engine drives a replica 1910 workshop with forge, power hammer, a lathe, radial arm drill and shaper
- Queen Street Mill, Burnley — line shafting operating 600 Lancashire looms, driven by a 500 horsepower coal fired stationary steam engine
- Shelsley Watermill, Shelsley Walsh, Worcester, United Kingdom — partially operable grain mill
- Stott Park Bobbin Mill, Cumbria, England — ??
- Tees Cottage Pumping Station, near Darlington, County Durham, England — complete original maintenance workshop in working order
- National Slate Museum, Wales — original equipment still powered by line shaft driven by the largest working water wheel in mainland Britain

==== United States ====
- Austin Organs. Hartford, Connecticut
- Cruiser Olympia, Philadelphia, Pennsylvania — operational machine shop
- East Broad Top Railroad and Coal Company. Rockhill Furnace, Pennsylvania — partially operable; machine shop, sheet metal shop, wood shop, blacksmiths shop, foundry
- Empire Mine State Park machine Shop, Grass Valley, California — machine tools ??
- Hagley Museum, Wilmington, Delaware
- Hanford Mills Museum, East Meredith, New York — operable; sawmill, gristmill, wood shop
- Kregel Windmill Factory Museum, Nebraska City, Nebraska — operable; windmill factory
- Longleaf Lumber Company/Southern Forest Heritage Museum, Longleaf, Louisiana — partially operable; machine tools, sawmill
- Mingus Mill, Great Smoky Mountains National Park, South Carolina — partially operable; grain mill
- Rock Run Grist Mill, Susquehanna State Park (Maryland), Havre de Grace, Maryland — operable; water-powered grist mill
- Sierra Railroad Shops/Railtown 1897 State Historic Park, Jamestown, California — operable; machine tools, blacksmith shop
- Slater Mill Historic Site, Pawtucket, Rhode Island — ??
- Thomas Edison National Historical Park, West Orange, New Jersey — machine tools ??
- W. A. Young and Sons Foundry and Machine Shop, Rices Landing, Pennsylvania —machine shop, foundry
- W. J. Doran Company, Waupaca, Wisconsin — fully operational; machine tools

=== Reconstructed or demonstration systems ===
==== United States ====
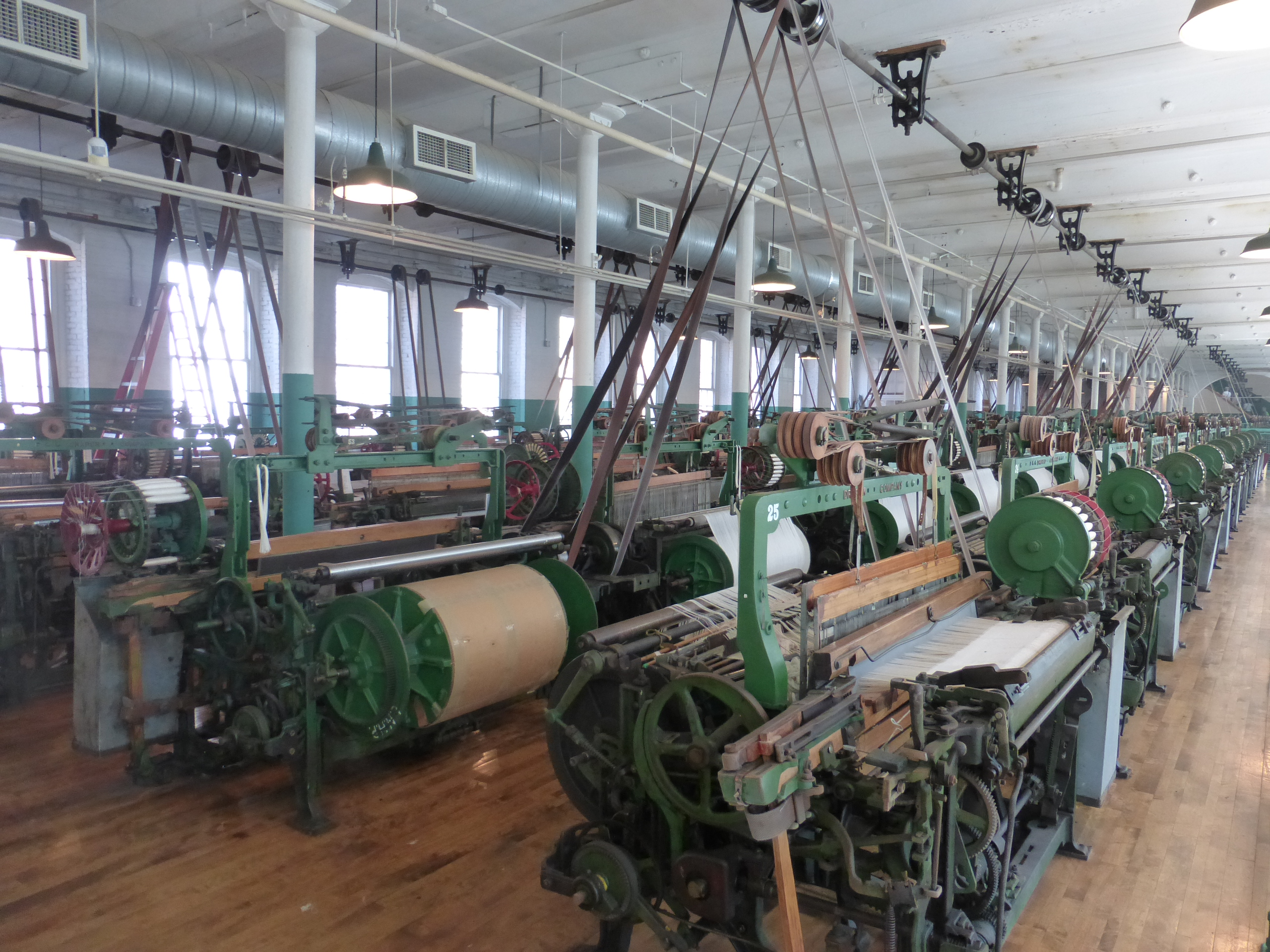
Line shaft and power looms at Boott Mills, Lowell, Massachusetts

- Hancock Shaker Village, Pittsfield, Massachusetts. Machine Shop powered by water turbine to run woodworking machines.
- Smithsonian Institution, Arts and Industries Building, Washington, D.C. — machine tools
- White River Valley Antique Association, Enora, Indiana — machine and woodworking tools
- Denton Farmpark, Denton, North Carolina — machine tools
- Cincinnati History Museum, Cincinnati, Ohio — machine tools
- Hagley Museum and Library, Wilmington, Delaware (original du Pont powder mills) — machine tools
- Henry Ford Museum and Greenfield Village, Dearborn, Michigan — machine tools
- Mollie Kathleen Mine, Cripple Creek, Colorado — sawmill
- Western Museum of Mining & Industry, Colorado Springs, Colorado — stamp mill, blacksmith shop, compressor
- Boott Mills, Lowell, Massachusetts — power cotton looms
- Silver Dollar City, Branson, Missouri — woodworking tools and bakery machinery
- Tuckahoe Steam & Gas Association, Easton, Maryland — operating machine shop museum
- Virginia Historical Society, Richmond, Virginia — ??
- Baltimore Museum of Industry, Baltimore, Maryland — machine tools
- Denton Farmpark, Denton, North Carolina — machine tools
- Muskegon Heritage Museum, Muskegon, Michigan — Corliss engine and machine tools
- Rough and Tumble Engineers, Kinzers, Pennsylvania - machine tools

== See also ==
- Lineshaft roller conveyor – uses a long shaft to drive a series of rollers
