= Worthen House =

Worthen House may refer to:

- Daniel Worthen House, historic house in Somerville, Massachusetts
- Worthen House (Lowell, Massachusetts), historic tavern
