= Kirk Boott =

American industrialist (1790–1837)

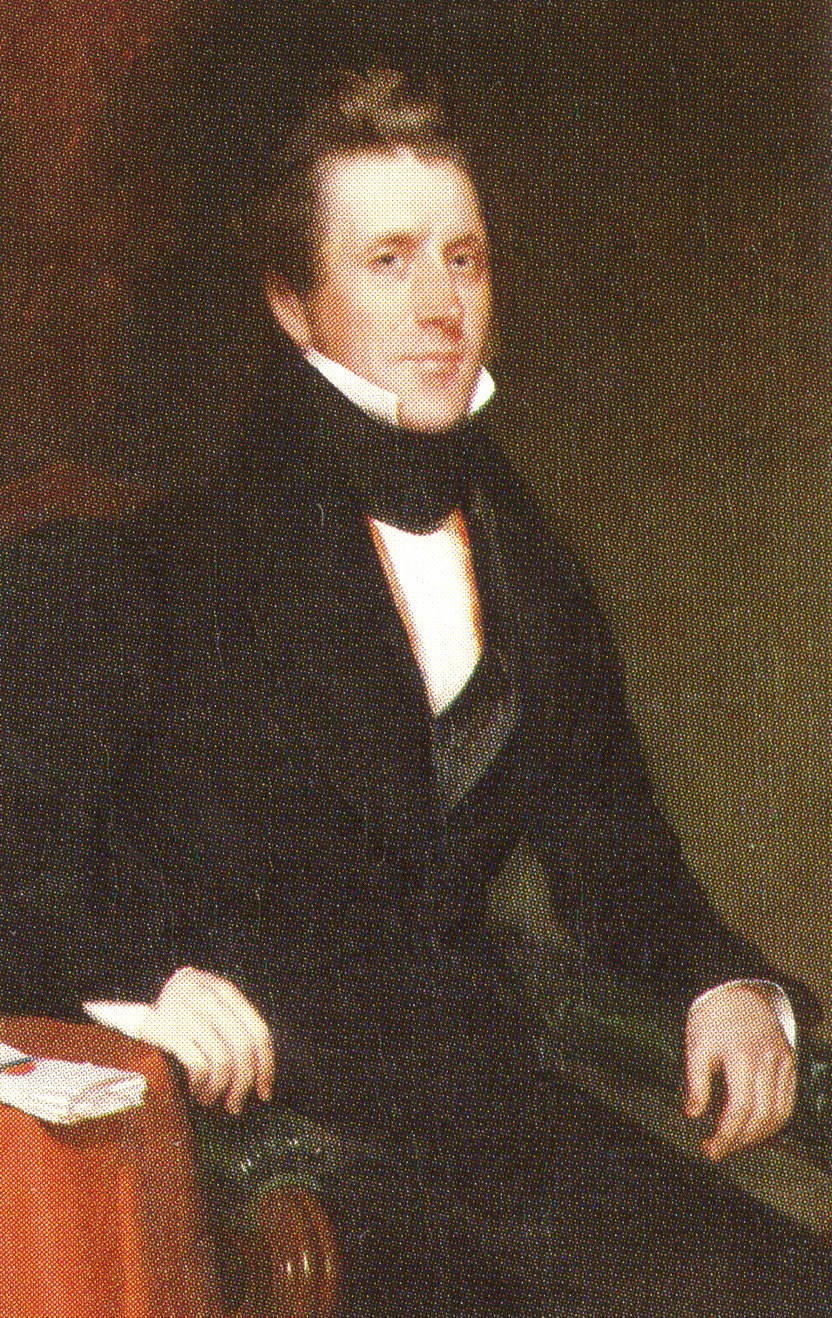
Kirk Boott

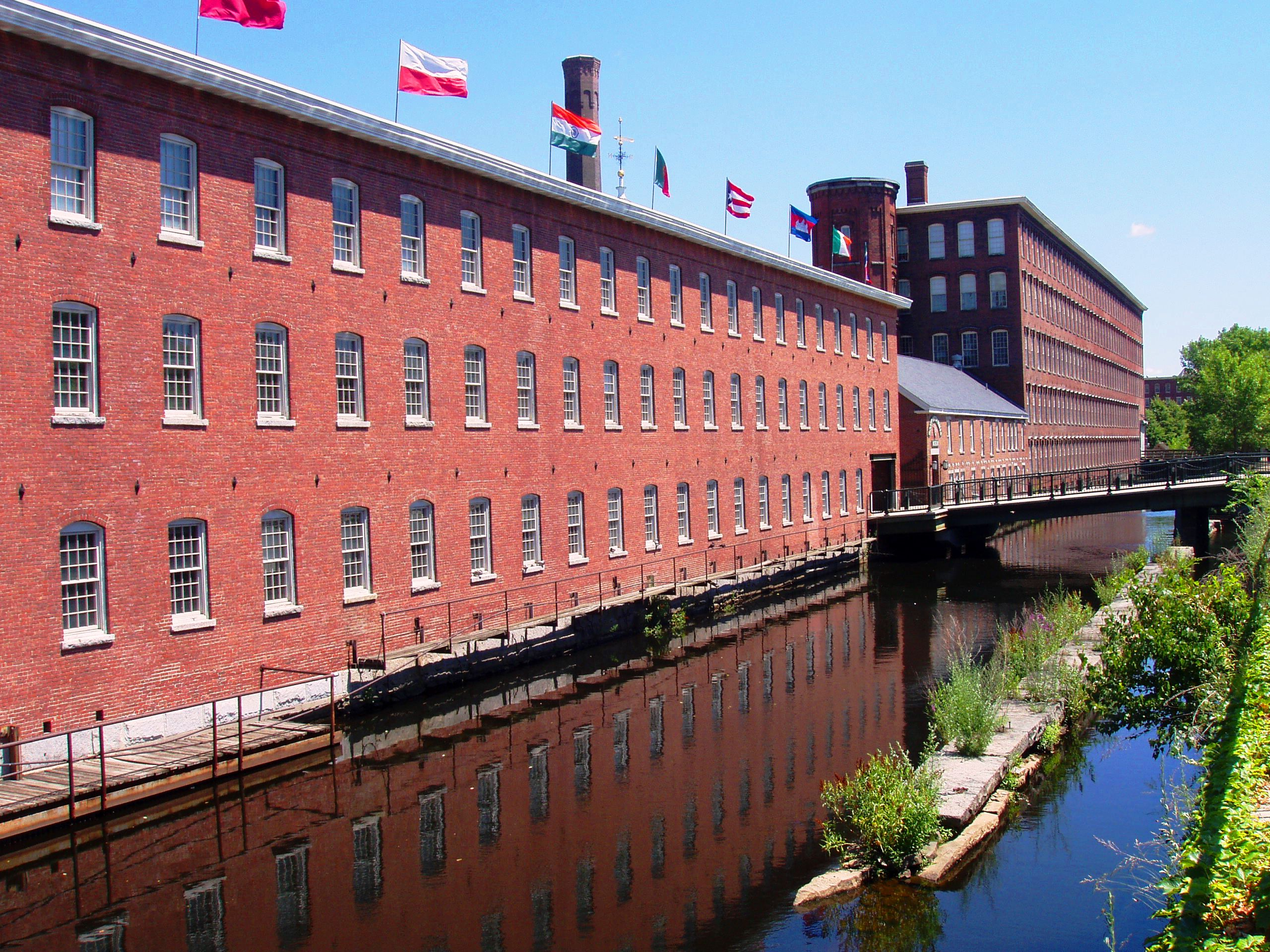
The Boott Mill complex now converted to a museum.

Kirk Boott (October 20, 1790 – April 11, 1837) was an American industrialist who was instrumental in the early history of Lowell, Massachusetts.

== Biography ==
Boott was born in Boston, Massachusetts in 1790. His father had emigrated to the United States from England in 1783, and worked in Boston as a wholesale merchant. After studying for a time in Boston schools, the son attended Rugby School in England, and later went to Harvard College (class of 1809). Before graduation, Boott left Harvard for England to study civil engineering with the goal of joining the British army.

When he was 21, a commission as lieutenant in the British army was purchased for him. With his regiment, the 85th light infantry, he took part in the peninsular campaign against Napoleon, landing in Spain in August 1813. After Napoleon had been sent to Elba, Boott's regiment was detailed for service against the United States, and took part in the attacks on Washington and on New Orleans. Boott, however, was excused from serving against the land of his birth.

After a short visit to the United States, Boott returned to England, and studied engineering at Sandhurst. Later he resigned his commission in the British army and came to Boston to engage in business with two of his brothers. He was not successful in this venture, however.

Boott then became involved in the Boston Manufacturing Company at Waltham, Massachusetts. At some point during his residency in England, Boott had an opportunity to tour the spinning mills in the midlands. He was a quick study of engineering principals and was reputed to have committed his observations to paper. These notes and drawings, none of them extant today, subsequently formed the basis of some of the innovations and improvements in the mechanics and design of spinning and weaving technology which helped to make the mills in Lowell and subsequently other mills in New England more profitable than many of their English counterparts.

When the Boston Manufacturing Company formed the Merrimack Manufacturing Company in 1822, Kirk Boott was sent to Lowell to be the first agent and treasurer, since the current agent, Patrick Tracy Jackson, had to remain in Waltham. Under Boott's leadership, the Merrimack Company was extremely profitable. When the Proprietors of Locks and Canals, the organization that controlled the canal water and land, was separated from the Merrimack Manufacturing Company, Boott became agent of that firm as well. In this position, he sold the water power the Merrimack Company did not use, allowing many other firms to open operations in Lowell. The city grew quite rapidly around these factories. Boott was also superintendent of the print works.

Boott, more so than the other founders of Lowell, was involved in the day-to-day operation of the town and the lives of its mill operatives. He chose the denomination of the first church (Episcopal), and even was involved in the design of school districts. He was moderator of the first town meeting, and was often sent to the state legislature.

Boott died in his carriage at the corner of Dutton and Merrimack Streets in downtown Lowell on April 11, 1837. Some reports say the carriage tipped, others say a back ailment stemming from his time in the military killed him.

== Family ==
Kirk Boott's father (born in Derby, England, 1750-1817) was also called Kirk Boott.

The carriage that Boott died in was to have another brush with death thirteen years later. According to family lore, Boott's beautiful and thrifty daughter, Mary Love Boott, continued to use the carriage, taking it with her after her marriage to Boston lawyer, Charles A. Welch, in 1844. Welch, who had recently assisted Edward Dexter Sohier in the defense of Dr. John Webster in the notorious and grisly murder and dismemberment on Thanksgiving Day, 1849, of the powerful, wealthy and eccentric Bostonian, Dr. George Parkman, used Boott's carriage to pick up Webster's body after he had been publicly executed on a gallows in Leverett Square. Mary never rode in the carriage again.

== Legacy ==
Kirk Boott's name lives on in the Boott Mills, and perpendicular Kirk Street, which is dominated by the old building of Lowell High School. In the Boott Mills, part of Lowell National Historical Park, The National Park Service has restored a weaving room to its 1920s appearance, giving the Park visitor a first hand look at some of the roots of the industrial revolution in the United States.
