= Lowell Folk Festival =

Free folk festival in the United States

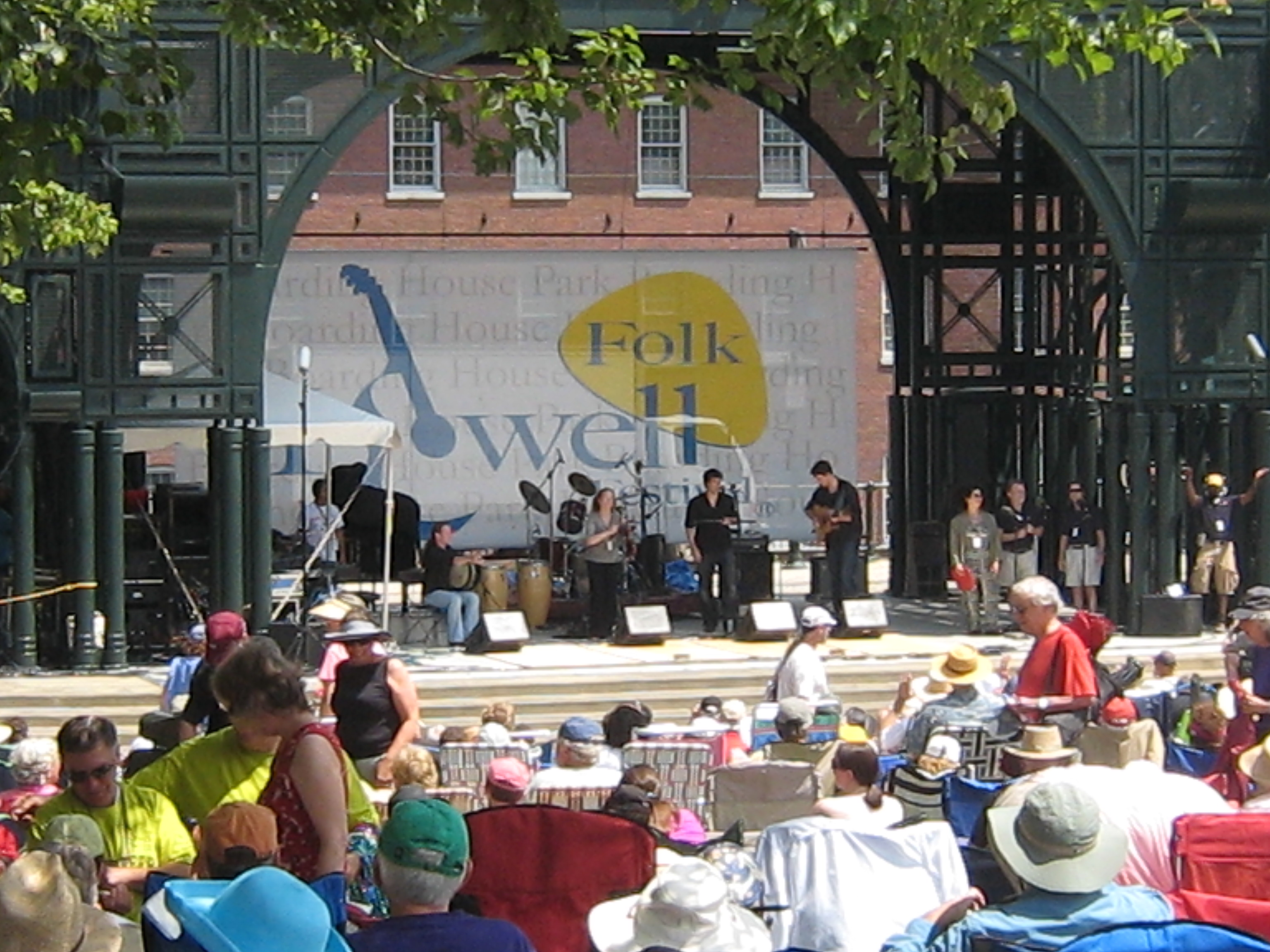
- Lowell Folk Festival 2009
- Genre: music festival and parades
- Dates: Last full weekend of July annually
- Locations: Lowell, Massachusetts, United States
- Years active: 1990–2019; 2022–
- Inaugurated: 1987
- Most recent: July 26–28, 2024
- Next event: July 25-27, 2025
- Website: Official website

The Lowell Folk Festival is the second longest-running, and second-largest, free folk festival in the United States to Seattle’s Northwest Folklife. It is made up of three days of traditional music, dance, craft demonstrations, street parades, dance parties, and ethnic foods. All of this is presented on six outdoor stages throughout the city of Lowell, Massachusetts.

It is one of many festivals in the U.S. that originated from the National Folk Festival. Lowell hosted the event from 1987 to 1989, and the locals continued this festival starting in 1990. The festival is held from Friday through Sunday on the last full weekend of July each year, and is presented by the Lowell Festival Foundation, Lowell National Historical Park, the National Council for the Traditional Arts, the City of Lowell, the Greater Merrimack Valley Convention and Visitors Bureau, Greater Lowell Community Foundation, and the Greater Lowell Chamber of Commerce.

In 2020, the COVID-19 pandemic caused the 34th festival to be cancelled. The 2021 festival was also cancelled, but returned in 2022. The next festival is scheduled for 23-25 July 2027.
