= Wannalancit Mills =

Cotton mill in Lowell, Massachusetts

Coordinates: 42°38′59″N 71°19′00″W

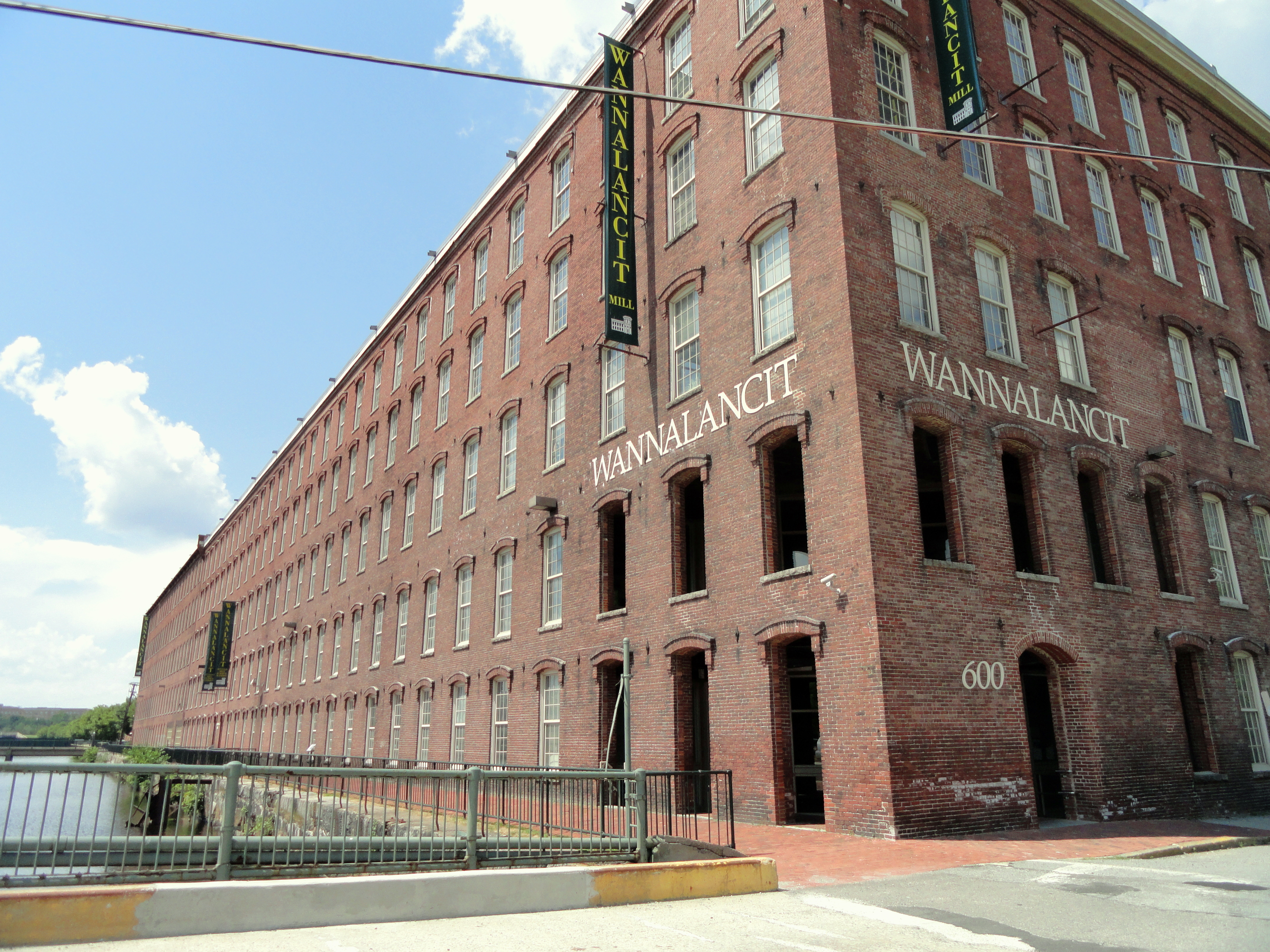
Wannalancit Mills building

The Wannalancit Mills (formerly the Suffolk Mills) in Lowell, Massachusetts is an early American cotton mill, parts of which date to the 1830s at the earliest. Its namesake is a corruption of Wonalancet, a sachem or sagamore of the Penacook Native American tribe. Today the complex is home to office space, conference center, and university research facilities.

== History ==
=== Operations ===
From turbine to line shaft at Suffolk Mills, part of the River Transformed Exhibit.

In 1830, the Suffolk Textile Company was established. Running off of hydropower and later steam power, the mill's buildings were soon built during the mass building mills in the city. During the Civil War, the mill was closed and rebuilt. In 1926, the Suffolk Mills were sold. The New England textile industry was in decline by World War I and collapsed after World War II yet the mill hung on. In 1950, the Wannalancit Textile Company moved into the mills, renaming them. In 1969, Colombian workers were brought in as they were skilled weavers and knew how to operate textile machinery. The mills finally closed in 1981.

=== Reuse ===
Today, the Wannalancit Mills are an example of adaptive re-use as they contain offices. Part of the mills are owned by the University of Massachusetts Lowell as well as Farley White Interests, a Boston-based real estate investment and development company. Farley White purchased 75% of the complex in 1998 and began a significant renovation and re-tenanting campaign. This effort culminated in the repointing of the property's smokestack. In 2000, the owners of the mill utilized their smokestack for the city's largest Christmas tree, reaching 256 feet in height. Yearly lighting costs are around $30,000. In 2010, the "tree" wasn't put up as owners cited costs of lighting to be a determining cause. since that year the lighting has reappeared. In years when the lights are up, the tree uses 5,440 green bulbs placed on 32 cables anchored to a 102-foot diameter base. A 19-foot star is placed on top of the tree. Today the Mill is home to over 50 commercial tenants working in research, social services, environmental studies and communications product development.

=== Transit ===
The National Streetcar Museum currently has a heritage streetcar stop here.

Preceding station	National Streetcar Museum	Following station
Terminus	Lowell Heritage Trolley Transit System	Boott Mills Terminus
Terminus	Lowell Heritage Trolley Transit System	Visitor Center Terminus

== See also ==
- Lowell mills
