= Boott Mills =

Cotton mill of Lowell, Massachusetts, built in 1835

Coordinates: 42°38′54″N 71°18′30″W

The Boott Mills

From line shaft to power looms at Boott Mills

The Boott Mills in Lowell, Massachusetts were a part of an extensive group of cotton mills, built in 1835 alongside a power canal system in this important cotton town. Its incorporators were Abbott Lawrence, Nathan Appleton, and John Amory Lowell, and is named after Kirk Boott, the first Agent of the Proprietors of Locks & Canals in Lowell. Today, the Boott Mills complex is the most complete remainder of antebellum textile mills built in Lowell. The original Mill No. 6 is managed by the National Park Service unit Lowell National Historical Park and houses the Boott Cotton Mills Museum and the Tsongas Industrial History Center for K-12 educational programs.

== Location ==
Lowell is 40 kilometres (25 mi) north-west of Boston on the Merrimack River. The location was chosen because of the water-power potential of the Merrimack River and the already-existing Pawtucket Canal, linking the Merrimack with the Concord River. At Lowell, the Merrimack drops 9 metres (30 ft) over a distance of 2 kilometres (1.2 mi), thereby suitable to provide 7,460 kilowatts (10,000 hp). Water had been diverted through canals and locks to enable navigation, and by a simple diversion the overflow could be used to power waterwheels.

== History ==
Kirk Boott worked for the company responsible for the Merrimack Canal the first power canal in Lowell, which was already driving other mills, and built his mills in 1835, staffing them using the Waltham-Lowell system. Running off of hydropower, the original operation consisted of four gable-roofed brick mill buildings. Eventually, floors were added, giving them flat roofs, the buildings were connected by stair towers and clock towers, and other buildings were added to the complex as well. Steam power and electric power were eventually introduced.

=== Decline ===
The New England textile industry was in decline by World War I and collapsed after World War II; the Boott Mills ceased operations in 1958. In the late 1970s, they became a key component of the Lowell National Historical Park, largely because the complex stood virtually whole, unlike other complexes which had suffered fires, or selective or wholesale demolition, like the older Merrimack Manufacturing Company. The Boott Mills site retains nine major factory structures built between 1835 and the 1880s. As such, it is a catalog of industrial development over that time period.

== Boott Cotton Mills Museum ==
The Boott Mills are now an example of adaptive re-use; they contain the Lowell National Historical Park Boott Cotton Mills Museum featuring a recreated weave room and other exhibits, privately owned and managed residential housing, and offices. The National Park Service also maintains a single row of recreated 'Mill girl' boarding house exhibits, modeled after that built to house the mainly young, female workforce recruited according to the Lowell System.

== Transit ==
The National Streetcar Museum currently has a heritage streetcar stop here.

Preceding station	National Streetcar Museum	Following station
Suffolk Mill Terminus	Lowell Heritage Trolley Transit System	Terminus
Visitor Center Terminus	Lowell Heritage Trolley Transit System	Terminus

== Archives and records ==
- Boot Cotton Mills account book at Baker Library Special Collections, Harvard Business School.

== See also ==
- Lowell mills

== Images ==
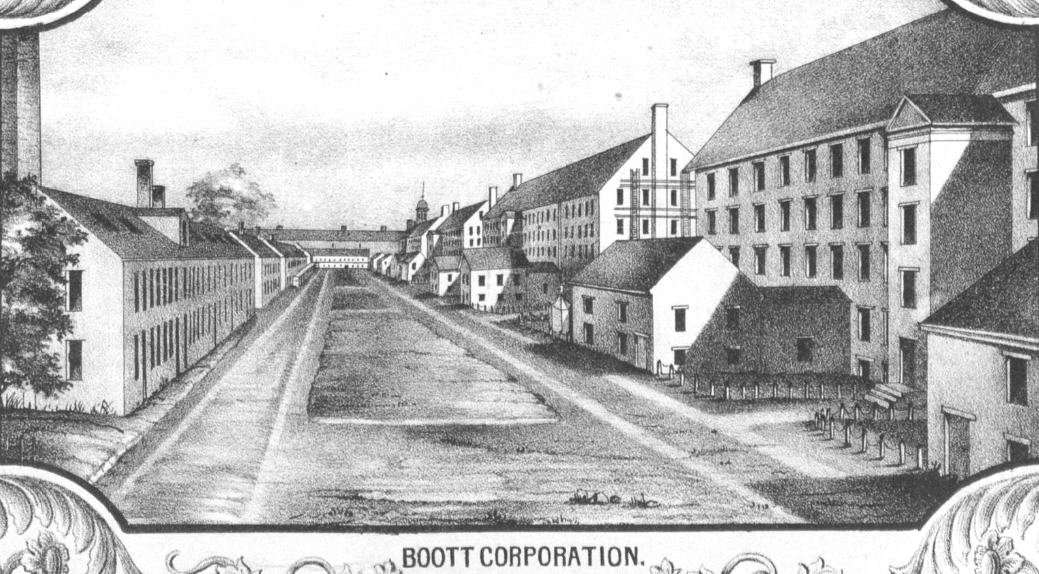
Boott Corp, 1850

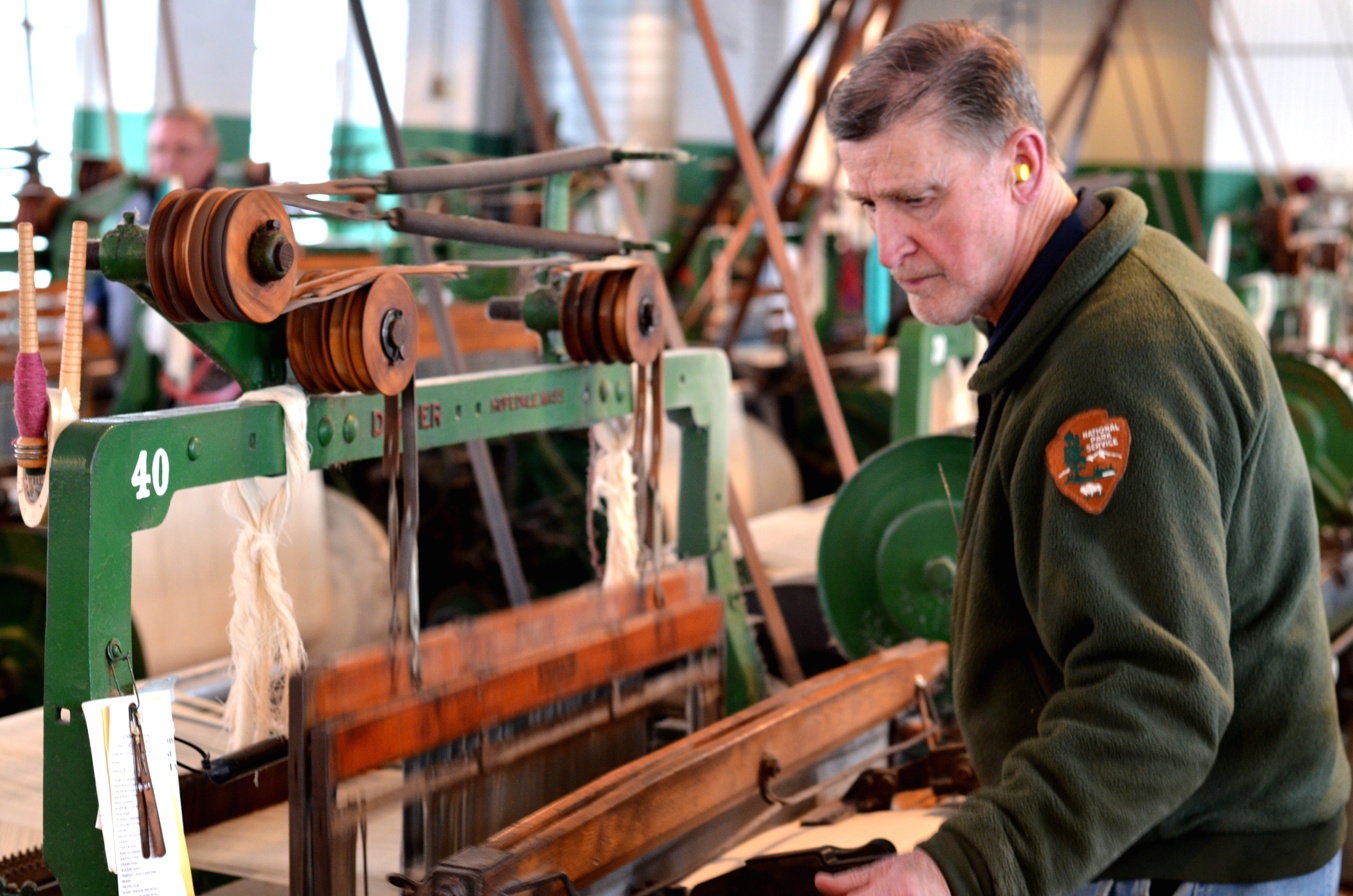
Boott Mills Power Loom in operation, 2015

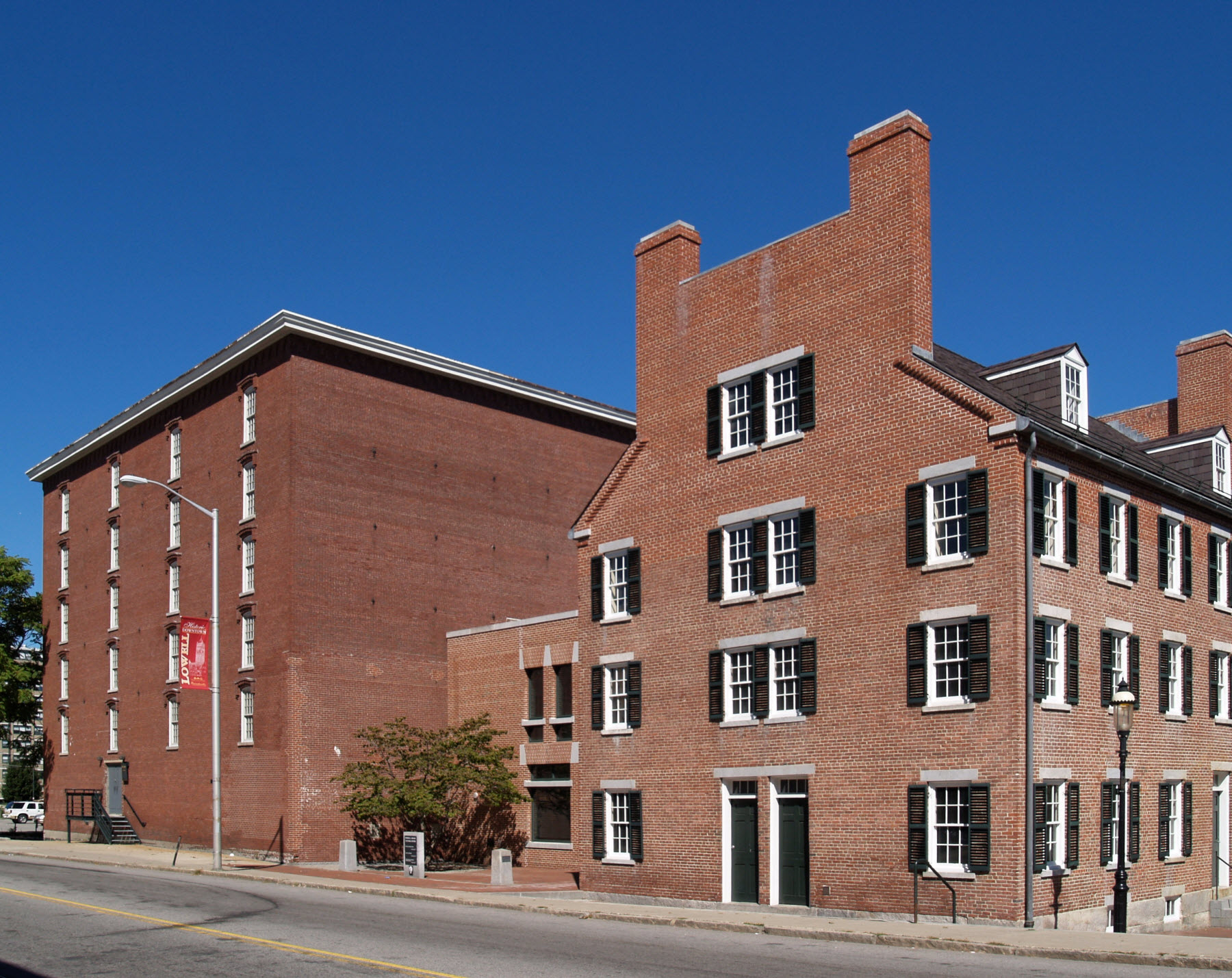
Boardinghouse and storehouse, 2005

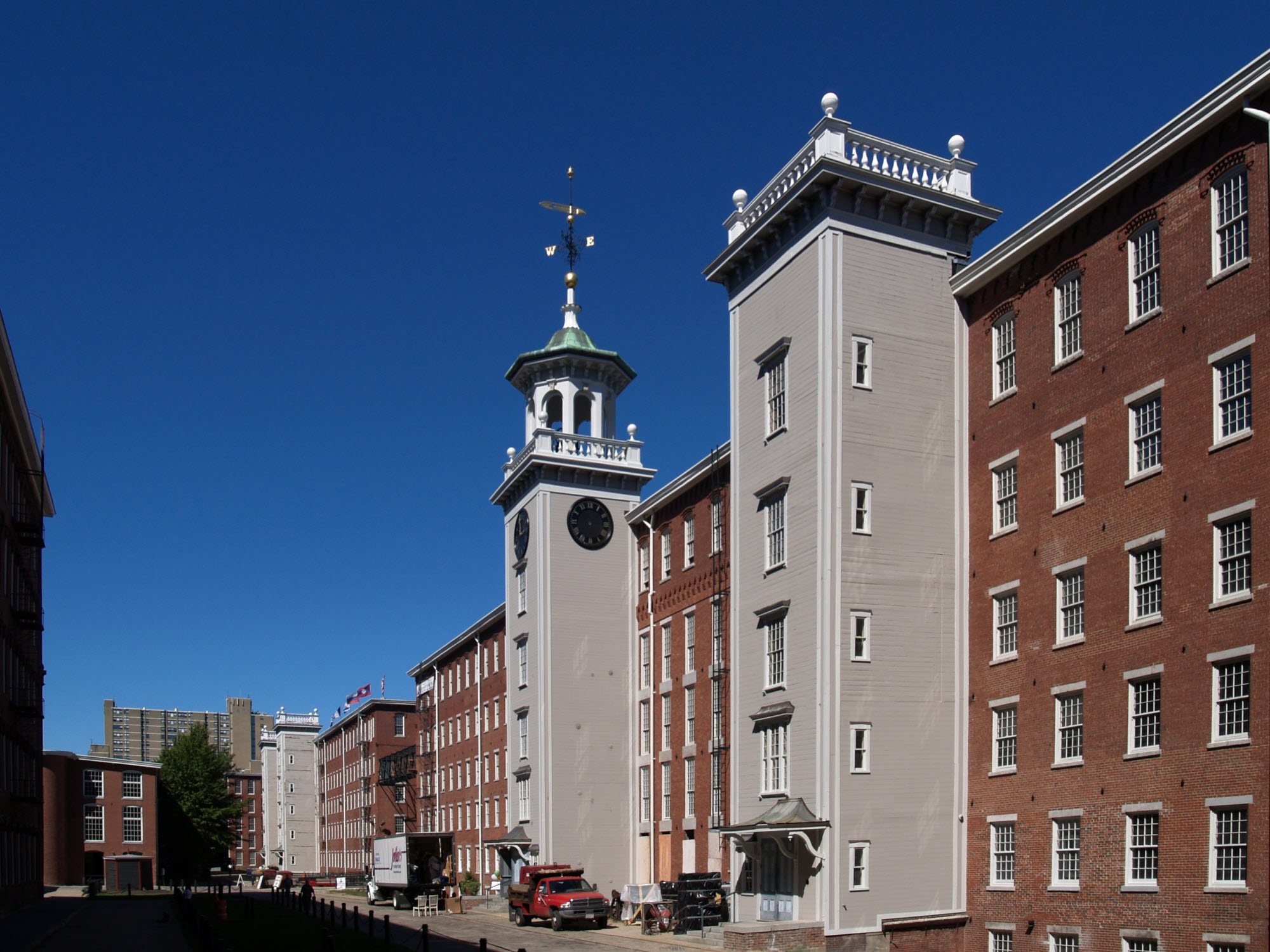
Inner courtyard, 2005

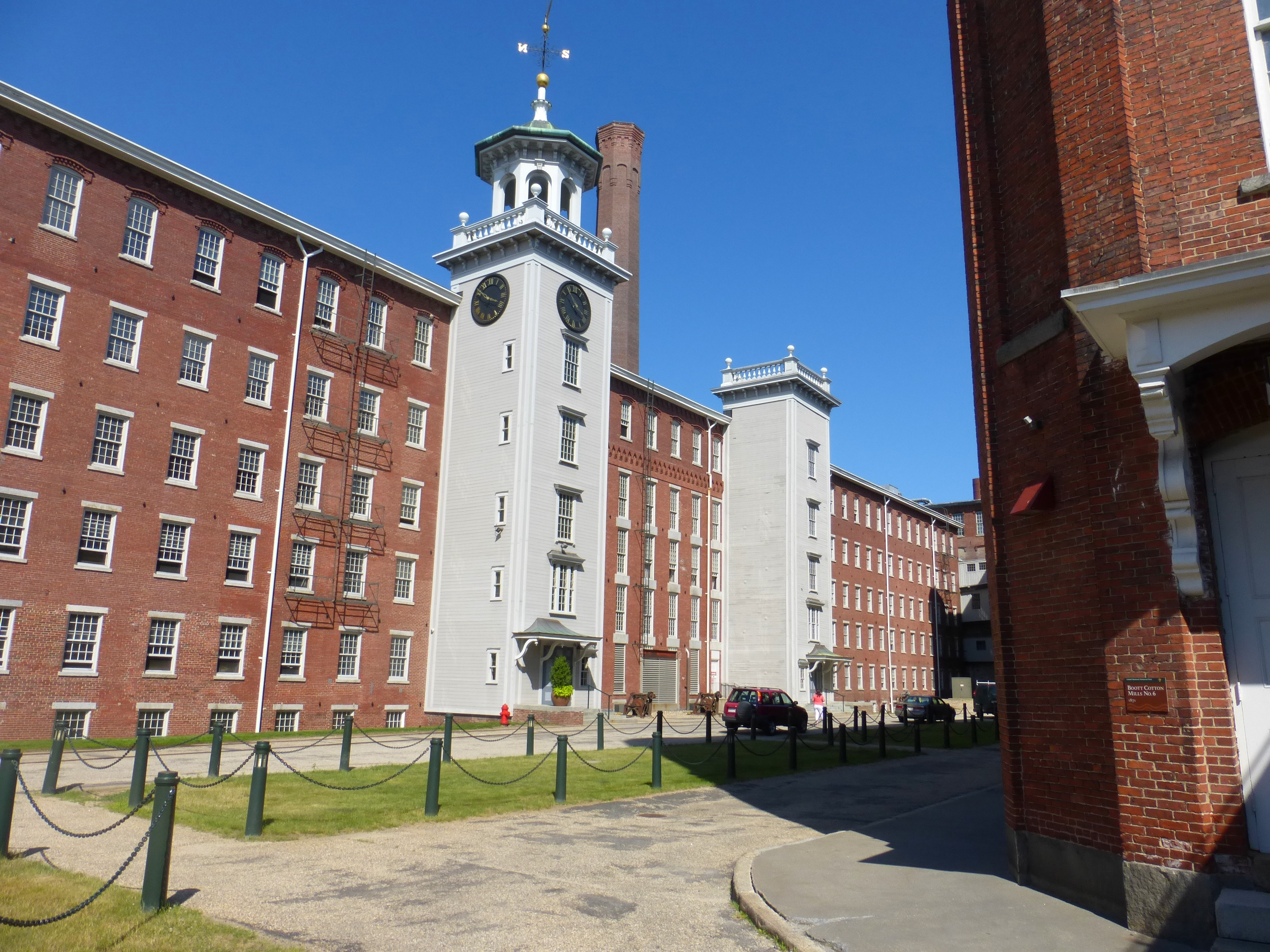
Boott Mills east courtyard, 2014

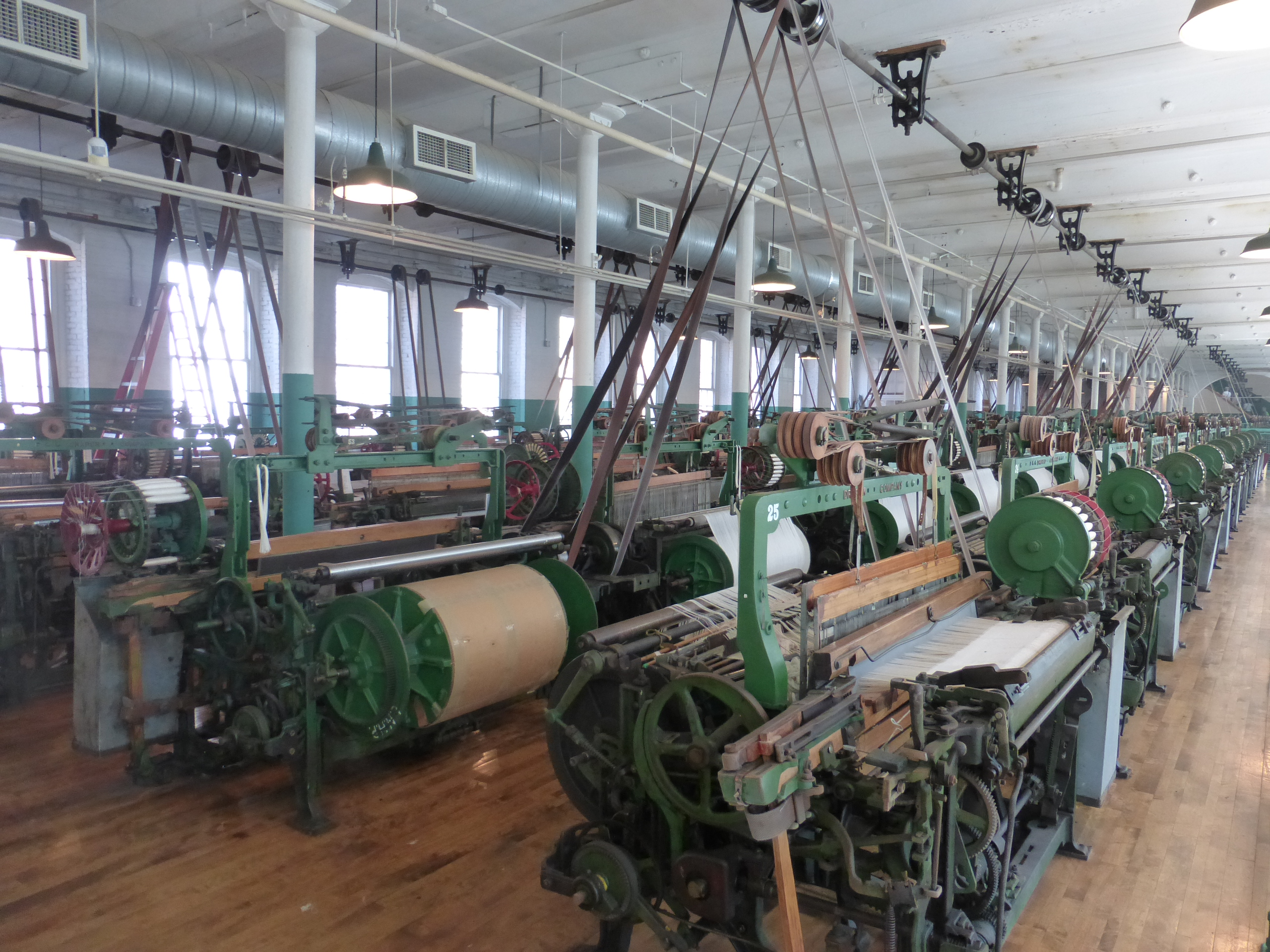
The exhibit, 2014
