= Worthen House (Lowell, Massachusetts) =

Coordinates: 42°38′44″N 1°18′51″E

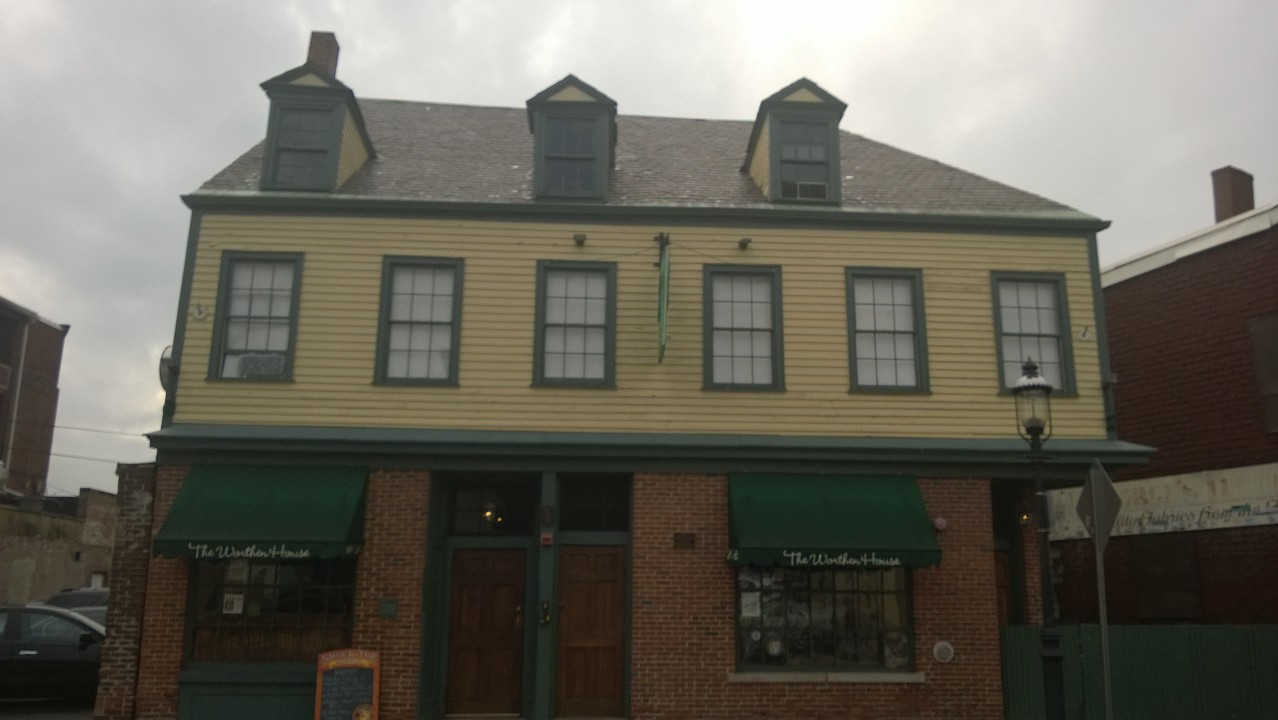
The Worthen House

The Worthen House, on 141 Worthen Street, Lowell, Massachusetts, is the oldest bar in Lowell, originally built in 1834 as the West India Goods Store.

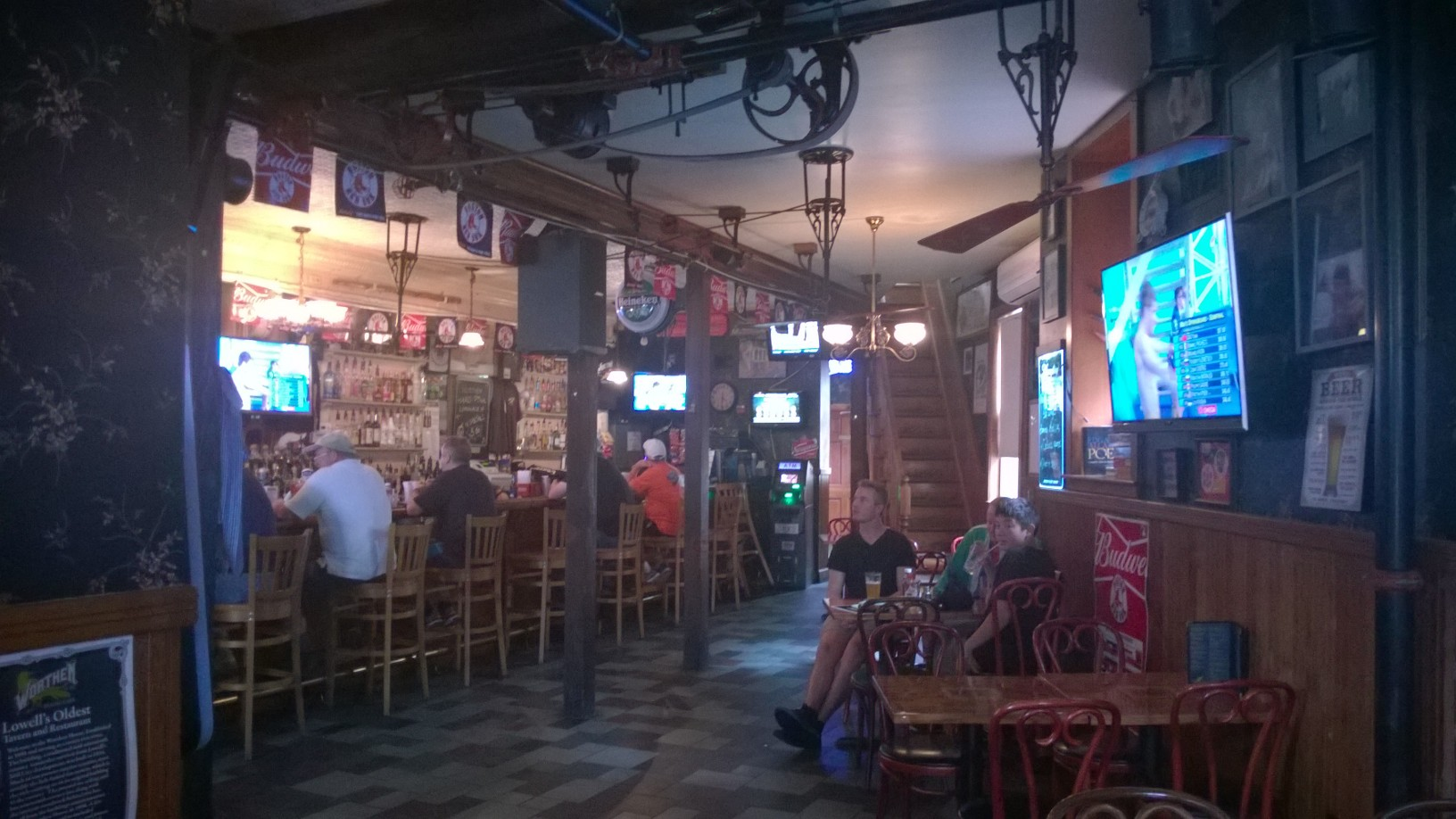
Interior facing the rear "point" and showing the belt-driven fans

In 1898 it was converted from a store to a tavern and a tin ceiling was installed in 1942. It is part of the Lowell National Historical Park and down the street from the Whistler birthplace, and it is noted in the National Register of Historic Places for its unusual pulley-driven fan system, which is one of only four in the United States and the only existing set known to be in its original location in the country. It can be turned on at a patron’s request. The fan was originally propelled by steam and served to keep flies off the dry goods. Today it is powered by electricity.

The building is triangular in shape, with the back of the building reduced to a point and an entrance door located at another streetside point. A center front-facing door previously led to the upper floor but now opens at the bar. During Prohibition the premises were still in use as a tavern, though local ownership records from 1924–1933 show it was a "restaurant" serving "beverages" and "soft drinks". A secret panel behind the bar and above a built-in ice box reveals a hiding place for various bottles of spirits.
