= Lowell National Historical Park =

National park in Massachusetts, United States

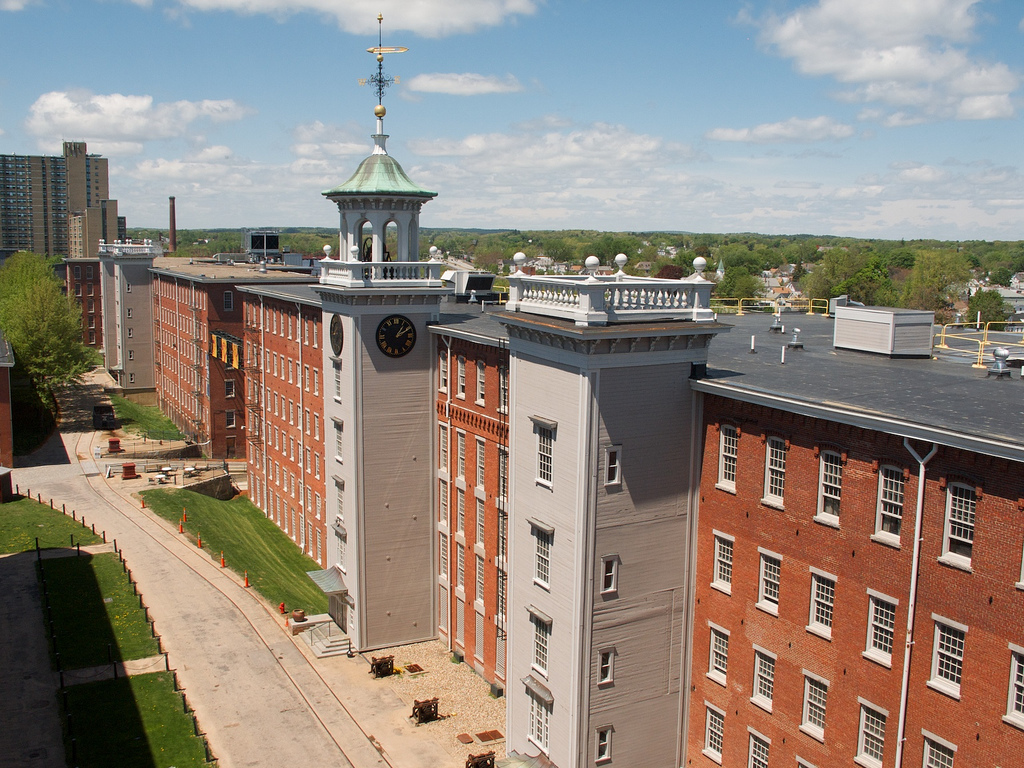
- The Boott Cotton Mill & Museum

- Location within Massachusetts Location within the United States
- Location: Lowell, Massachusetts, United States
- Nearest city: Lowell, Massachusetts
- Coordinates: 42°38′48″N 71°18′37″W
- Area: 141 acres (57 ha)
- Established: June 5, 1978
- Visitors: 520,452 (in 2011)
- Governing body: National Park Service
- Website: Lowell National Historical Park

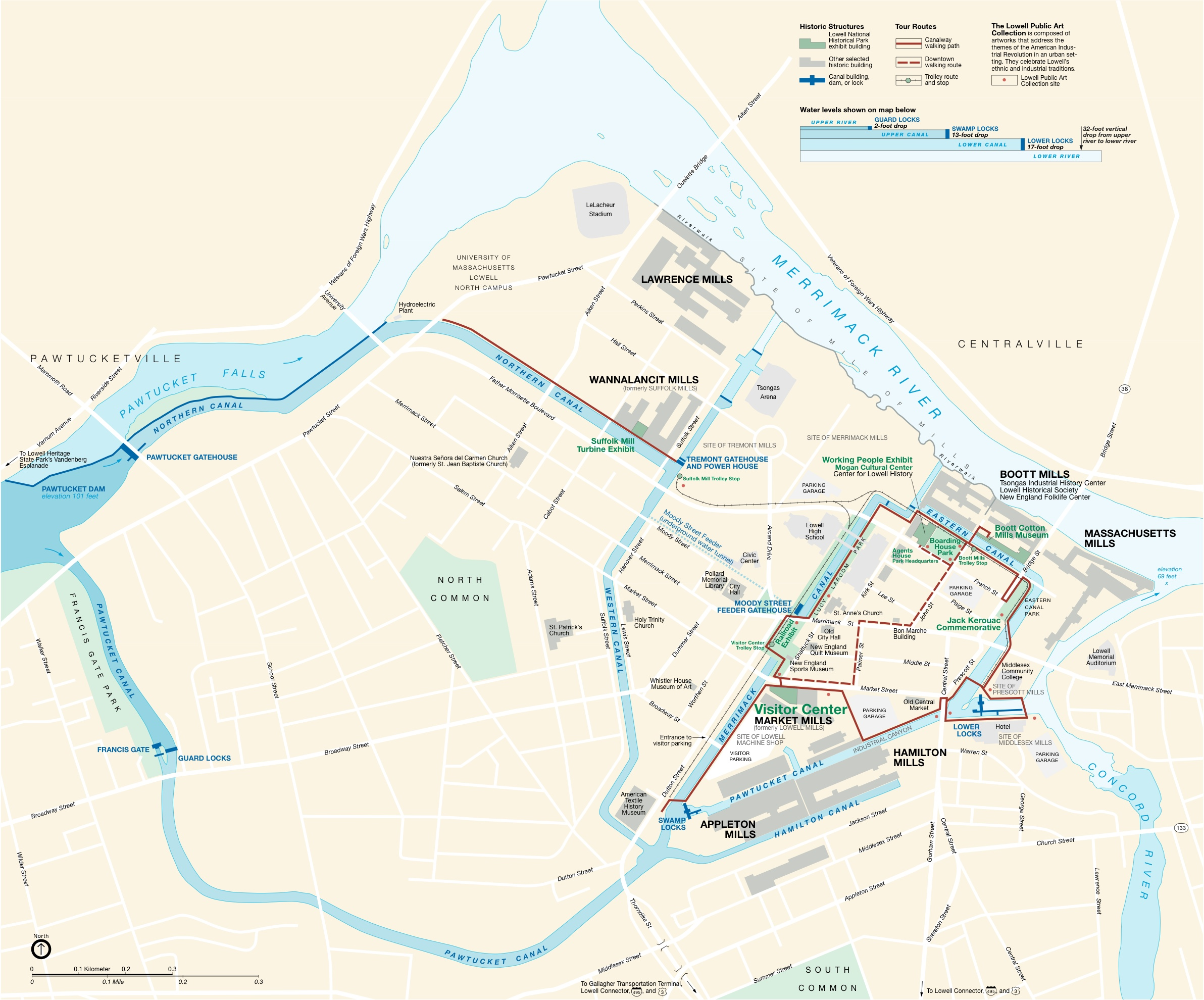
Official Map of the Lowell National Historical Park

Lowell National Historical Park is a National Historical Park of the United States located in Lowell, Massachusetts. Established in 1978 a few years after Lowell Heritage State Park, it is operated by the National Park Service and comprises a group of different sites in and around the city of Lowell related to the era of textile manufacturing in the city during the Industrial Revolution. In 2019, the park was included as Massachusetts' representative in the America the Beautiful Quarters series.

== History ==
See the History of Lowell, Massachusetts article for a detailed history of the city

First settled by Europeans in the 17th century, East Chelmsford (later renamed Lowell in honor of the founders' deceased business partner) became an important manufacturing center along the Merrimack River in the early 1820s. It was seen as an attractive site for the construction of a planned industrial city, with the Middlesex Canal (completed in 1803) linking the Merrimack to the Charles River, which flows through Boston, and with the powerful 32' Pawtucket Falls. The already existent Pawtucket Canal, designed for transportation around the Pawtucket Falls on the Merrimack, became the feeder canal for a 5.6-mile long system of power canals based around the falls. Unlike many other mill towns, however, Lowell's manufacturing facilities were built based on a planned community design. Specifically Lowell was planned as reaction to the mill communities in Great Britain, which were perceived as cramped and inhumane. Some called it the "Lowell Experiment", which was an attempt at creating a manufacturing center with a combination of production efficiency with democratic morals and social structure.

Initially the factories of Lowell were built with ample green space and accompanying clean dormitories, in a style that anticipated such later architectural trends as the City Beautiful movement in the 1890s. Lowell attracted both immigrants from abroad and migrants from within New England and Quebec (including a large proportion of young women, known as Lowell mill girls) who lived in the dormitories and worked in the mills.

The textile industry in New England experienced a sharp decline after World War II and by the 1960s, many of the Lowell's textile mill buildings were abandoned. In the late 1960s and early 1970s, several important forces came together from which emerged the Lowell National Historical Park. Congressman F. Bradford Morse assisted in the city's selection for "Model Cities" status; Brendan Fleming, UMass Lowell (UML) Math Department faculty member, after his election to the Lowell City Council proposed the first Historic District "The Mill and Canal District" which was approved in 1972; Gordon Marker, executive director of Model Cities and an urban planner, was instrumental in designing the concept for an Urban Park based on Historic Preservation and Economic Revitalization; Patrick Mogan, Education Administrator and later Superintendent of Schools, was primarily interested in Lowell's children and strongly advocated the preservation and sharing of their cultural experiences; and the Lowell Historical Society which opened the Lowell Museum in 1976. Together these circles of interest became a collaborating force led by United States Senator and Lowell native Paul Tsongas to enact legislation for a national park. In 1978, the United States Congress established the Lowell National Historical Park, the Lowell Historic Preservation District, and the Lowell Historic Preservation Commission.

In 1990, The Trust for Public Land assisted the National Park Service in acquiring 3 acres for the purpose of housing the headquarters for the Lowell National Historical Park.

== Legislative history of Lowell ==
Lowell National Historic Park was established by the Lowell Establishment Act in 1978. Lowell National Historical Park was established due to its significant cultural and historical sites and structures. This significance of these cultural and historical sites and structures symbolized aspects of the Industrial Revolution. Lowell is also represented to be the most significant planned industrialized city in the United States, which is a very important historical aspect in United States history. Another factor is that the immigration of different ethnic groups during the late nineteenth and early twentieth century was represented in Lowell's neighborhoods. Preserving this area of land would allow for these representations to still be preserved in Lowell's neighborhoods. Even though the city of Lowell had a large budget for cultural and historical preservation, they would still need the assistance of the federal government to ensure that all necessary early buildings and structures were preserved. The extra protection and funding by the federal government will allow for the preservation of these lands. By establishing Lowell as a National Park that is protected by the federal government, the history and significance of the Industrial Revolution, as well as cultural aspects would be preserved and shared with present and future generations.

In 2012, The Lowell National Historical Park Land Exchange Act of 2012 was added to the original legislation to allow for land within park boundaries to be exchanged with land owned by the Commonwealth of Massachusetts, the city of Lowell, or the University of Massachusetts building authority. Lowell National Historic Park is an originally established park and did not replace a previously established site.

== Administrative history of Lowell ==
Chronological order of superintendents:

- Lewis S. Albert: 1978–1980
- James L. Brown: 1980–1981
- John J. Burchill: 1981–1984
- Lawrence D. Gall: 1984-1984
- Chrysandra "Sandy" L. Walter: 1984–1992
- Rich Rambur: 1993–1999
- Patrick McCrary: 1999–2005
- Michael Creasey: 2005–2012
- Peter Aucella: 2012–2012
- Celeste Bernardo: 2012–2021
- Julie Galonska: 2021-Present

Regional affiliation in chronological order

- North Atlantic Region: 1978–1995
- Northeast Region: 1995–2018
- Northeast Atlantic-Appalachian Region: 2018–present

== Park information ==
Among the notable features of the park are:

- Boott Cotton Mill and Museum
- The Francis Gate
- Pawtucket Dam and Gatehouse
- Suffolk Mill Turbine and Powerhouse
- Kirk Street Agents House
- Mill Girls and Immigrants Boardinghouse
- The Lowell Canal System
- Swamp Locks, Lower Locks, Guard Locks
- Merrimack River and Northern Canal Walkway
- The Worthen House
- National Streetcar Museum and the associated trolley service, which runs through the park
- Boarding House Park, which hosts the Lowell Folk Festival and the Lowell Summer Music Series.

The park includes a visitor center, as well as many restored and unrestored sites from the 19th century. The visitor center provides a free self-guided tour of the history of Lowell, including display exhibits such as the patent model of a loom by local inventor S. Thomas.

A footpath along the Merrimack Canal from the visitor center is lined with plaques describing the importance of various existing and former sites along the canal. The Boott Mills along the Merrimack River, on the Eastern Canal, is the most fully restored manufacturing site in the district, and one of the oldest. The Boott Mill provides a walk-through museum with living recreations of the textile manufacturing process in the 19th century. The walking tour includes a detour to a memorial to local author Jack Kerouac, who described the mid-20th century declined state of Lowell in several of his books. A walkway along the river leads to several additional unrestored mill sites, providing views of restored and unrestored canal raceways once used by the mills. Additionally, the park includes the Patrick J Mogan Cultural Center, which focuses on the lives of Lowell's many generations of immigrants. Other exhibits include a working streetcar line, canal boat tours exploring some of the city's gatehouses and locks, and the River Transformed / Suffolk Mill Turbine Exhibit, which shows how water power, the Francis Turbine, ran Lowell's textile factories.

== Photo gallery ==
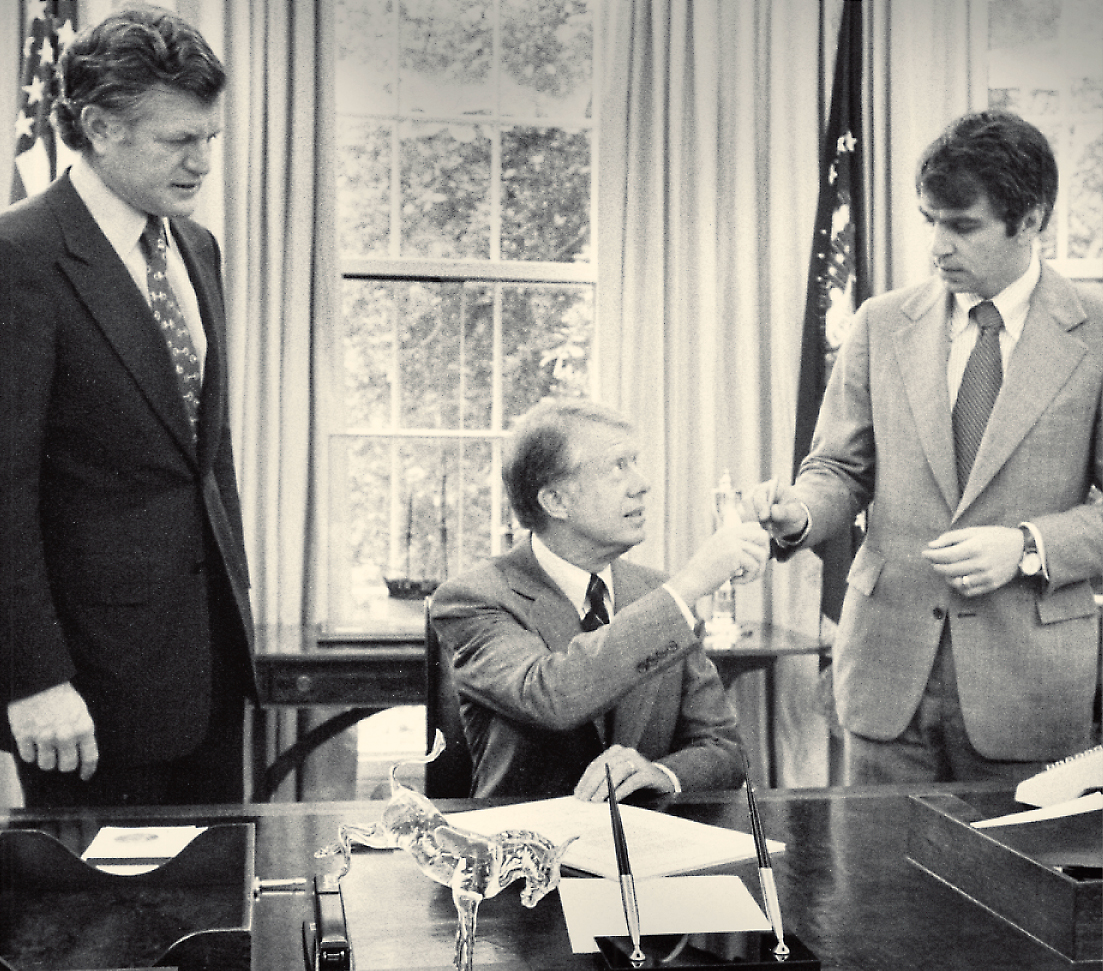
U.S. President Jimmy Carter (center) with Ted Kennedy (left) and Paul Tsongas signs the creation of Lowell National Historical Park, 1978

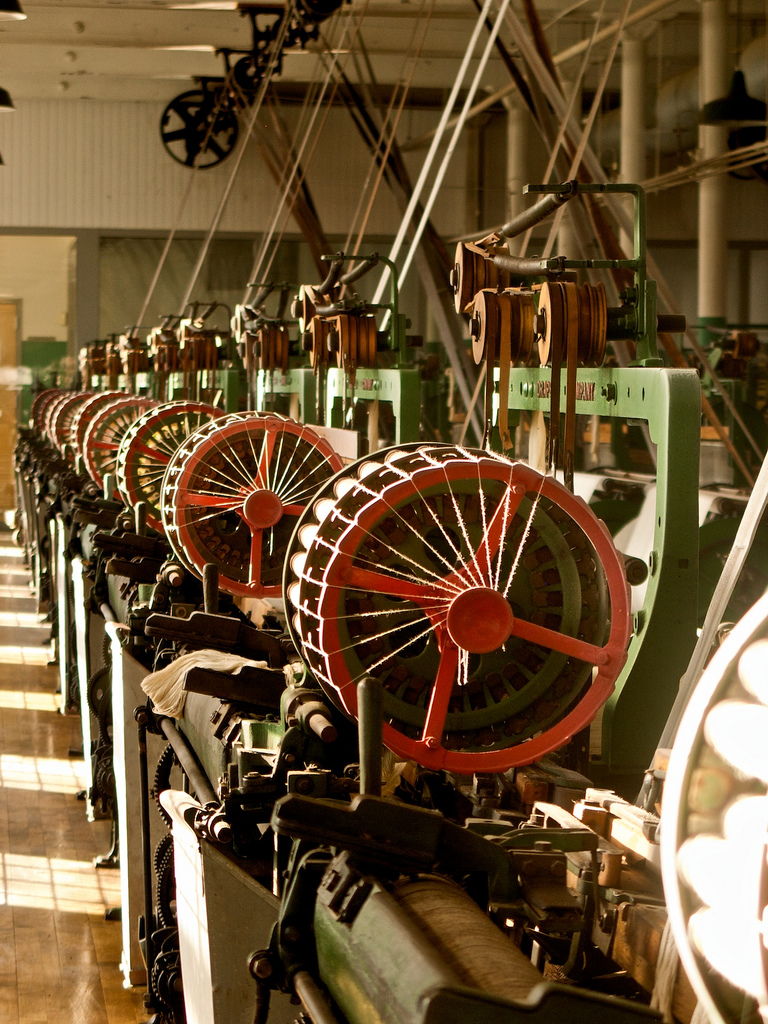
Authentic Looms in the Boott Cotton Mill and Museum

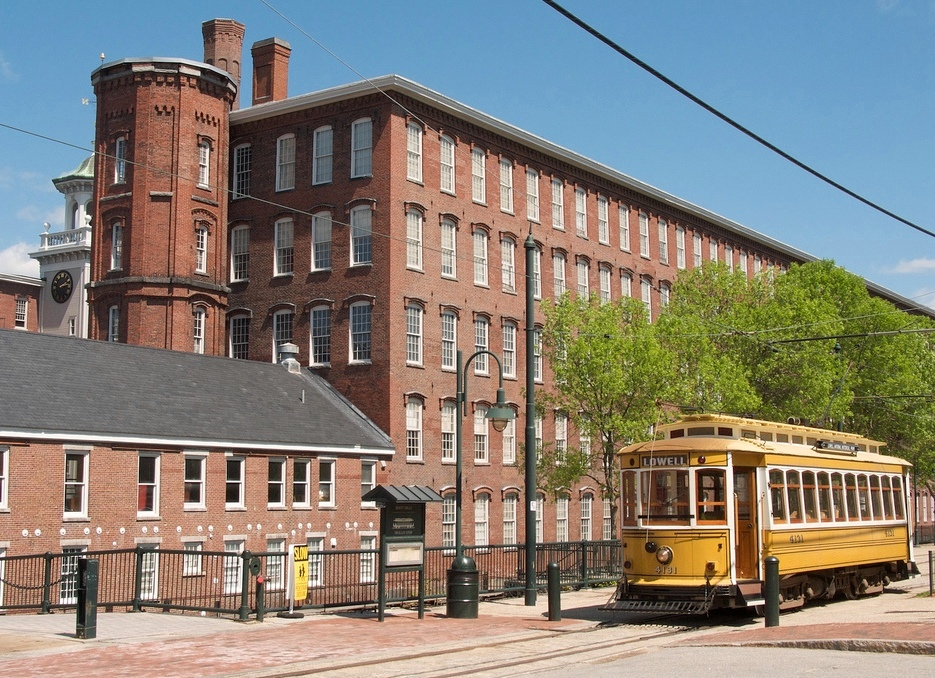
The Boott Cotton Mill and Museum and Park Trolley

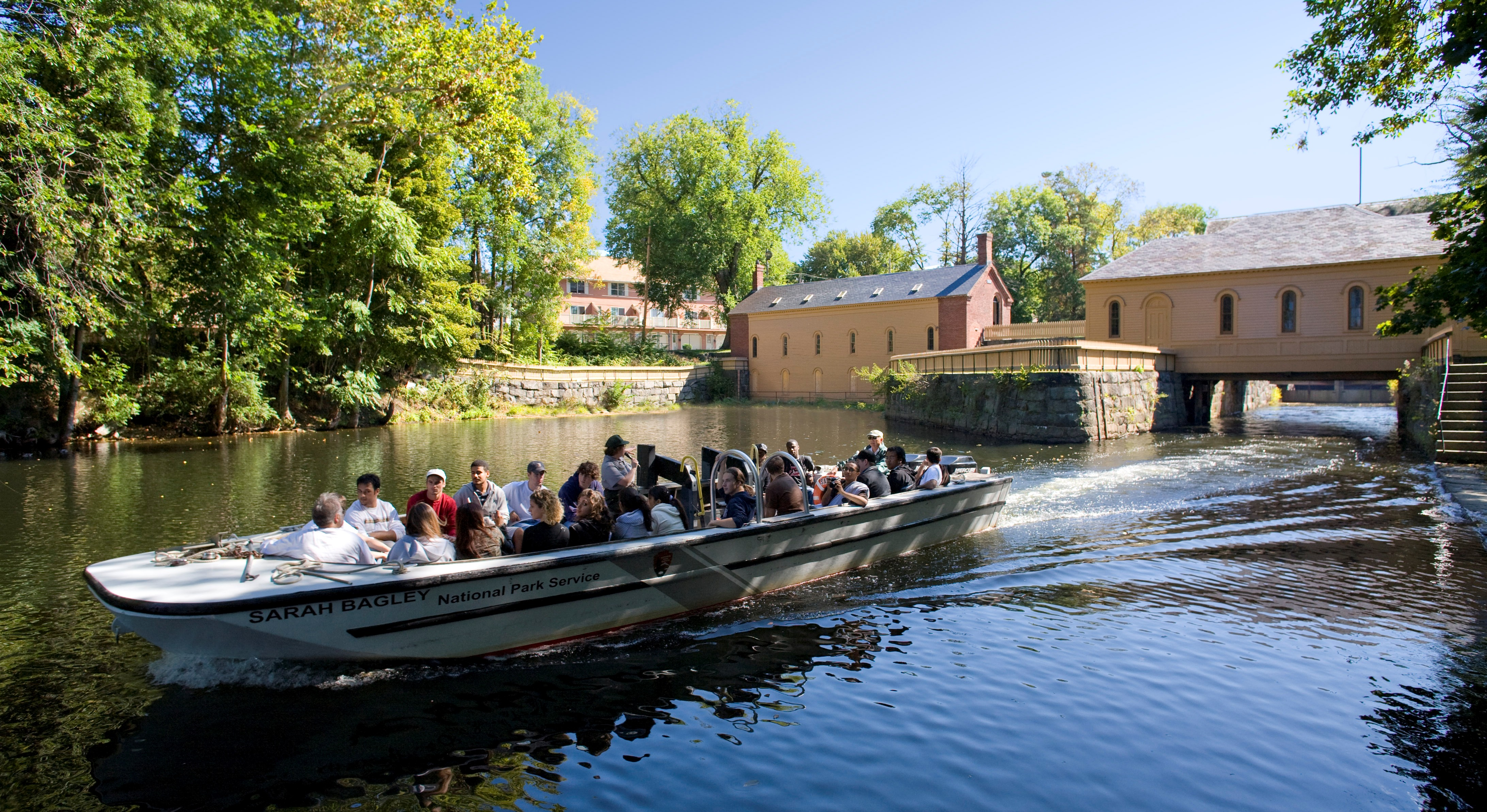
The Park offers boat tours of the historic Lowell Canal System

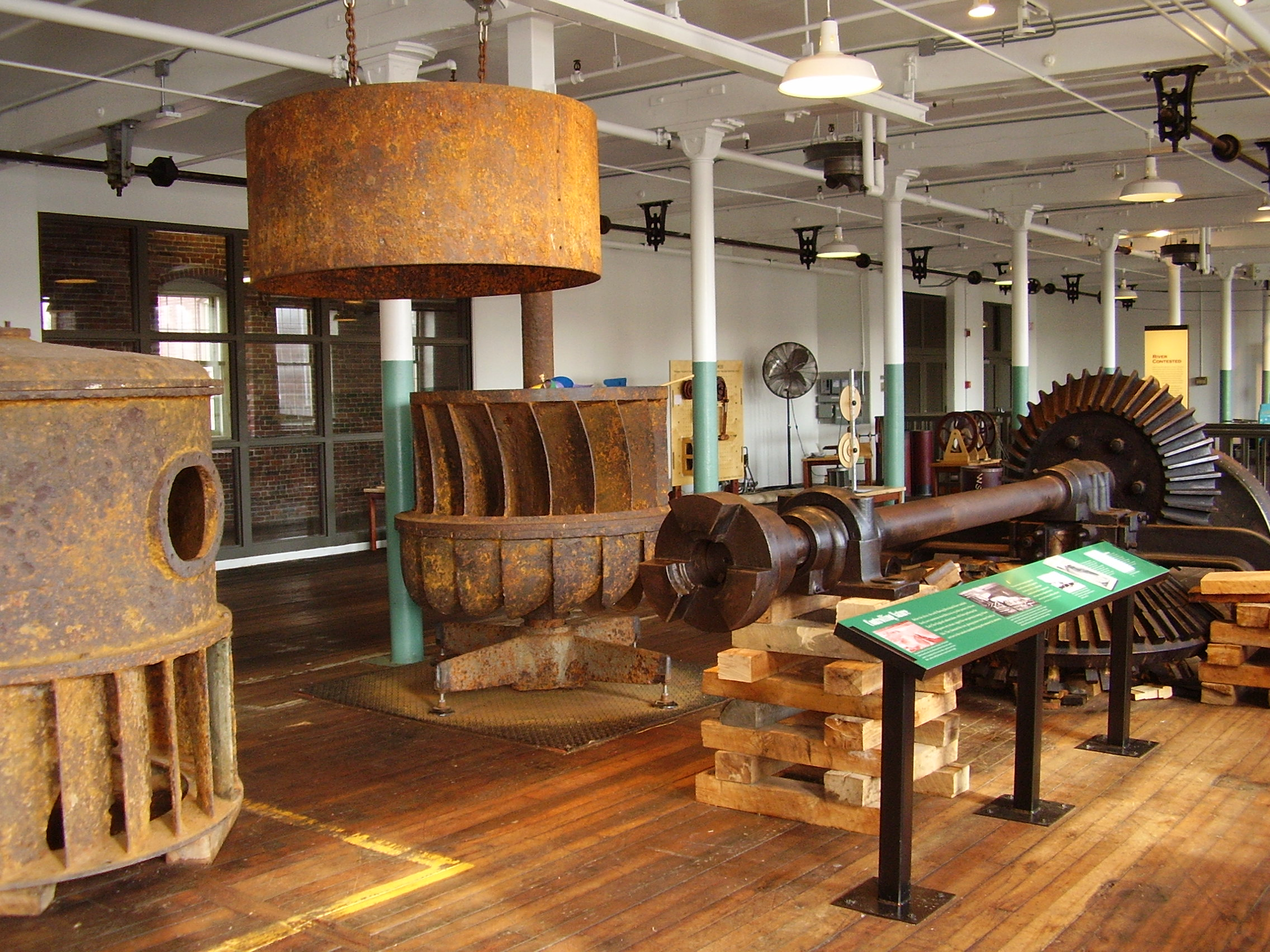
The River Transformed Exhibit at the Wannalancit Mill

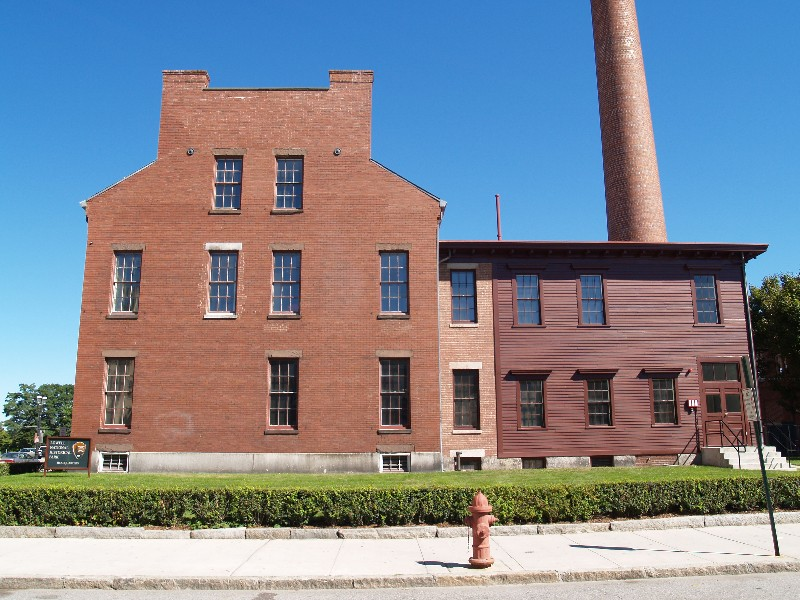
Park Headquarters, Paige Street

From turbine to line shaft at Suffolk Mills, part of the River Transformed Exhibit

From line shaft to power looms at Boott Mills

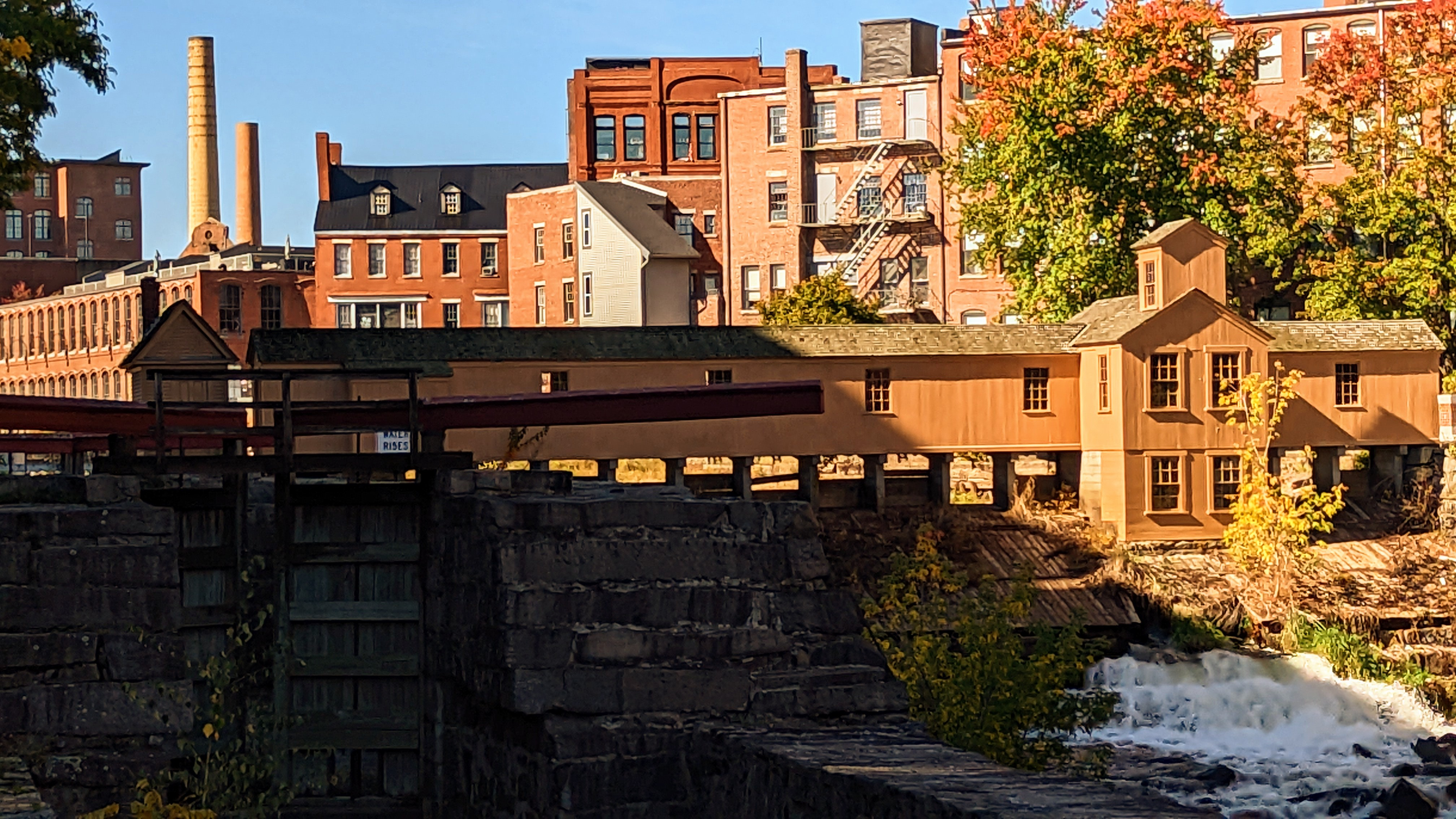
Lower Locks, Lowell National Historic Park in the autumn

== See also ==
- Society for the Establishment of Useful Manufactures
- National Register of Historic Places listings in Lowell, Massachusetts
