= Daniel Worthen House =

Historic house in Massachusetts, United States

- U.S. National Register of Historic Places
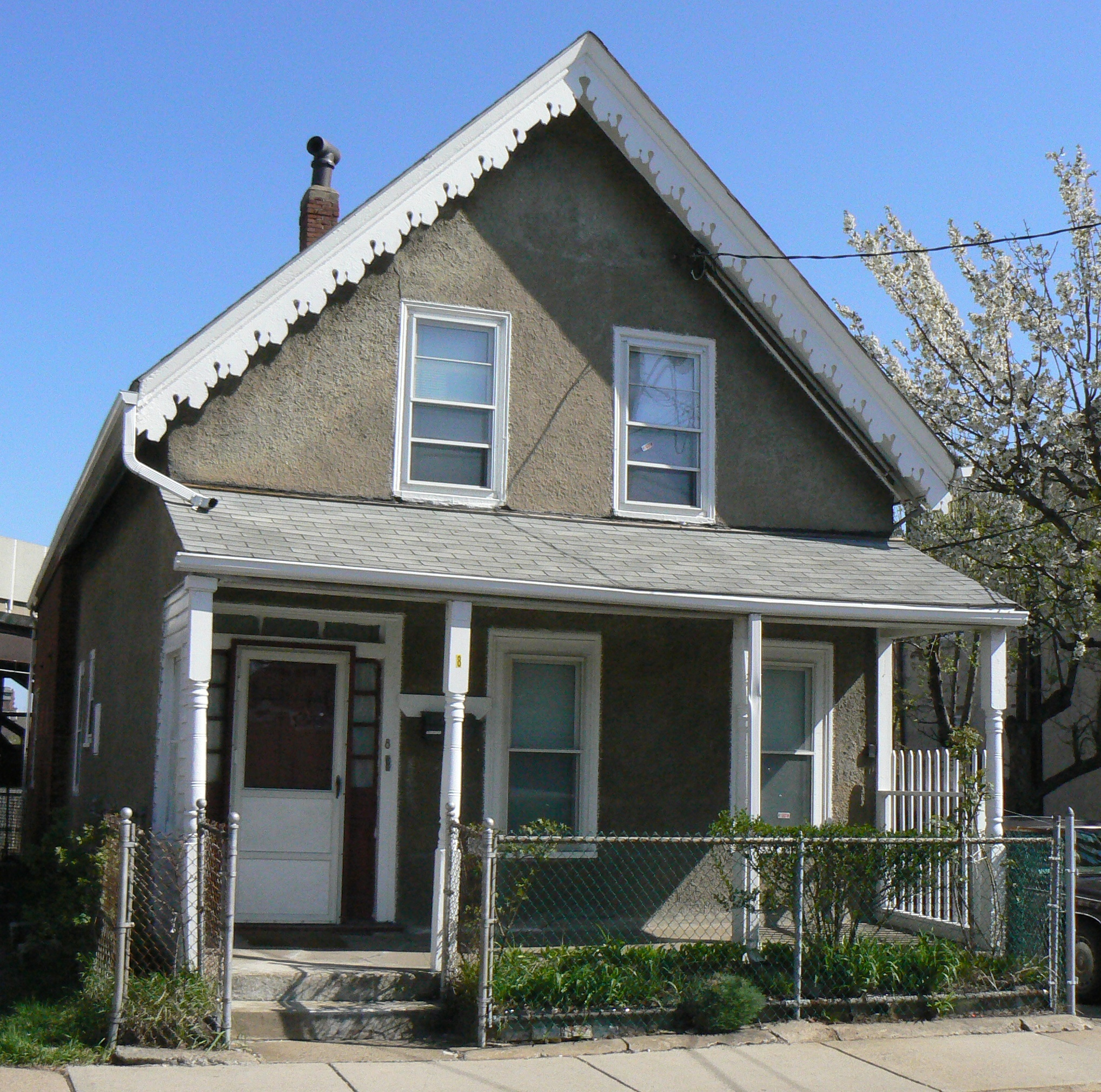

- Location within Massachusetts Location within the United States
- Location: 8 Mt. Pleasant Street, Somerville, Massachusetts
- Coordinates: 42°23′7″N 71°4′43″W
- Architectural style: Gothic Revival
- MPS: Somerville MPS
- NRHP reference No.: 89001272
- Added to NRHP: September 18, 1989

The Daniel Worthen House is a historic house in Somerville, Massachusetts. The modest 1 1/2-story wood-frame house was first owned by Daniel Worthen, a distiller, and is notable as a rare example of Gothic Revival styling in East Somerville. The house has a jigsaw-cut foliate vergeboard on its gable. It has a three-bay front facade, with a front-facing gable roof and a single-story shed-roof porch supported by turned posts.

The house was listed on the National Register of Historic Places in 1989.

== See also ==
- National Register of Historic Places listings in Somerville, Massachusetts
