= National Streetcar Museum =

Streetcar museum in Massachusetts

Coordinates: 42°38′42.5″N 71°18′46.2″W

Lowell Trolley
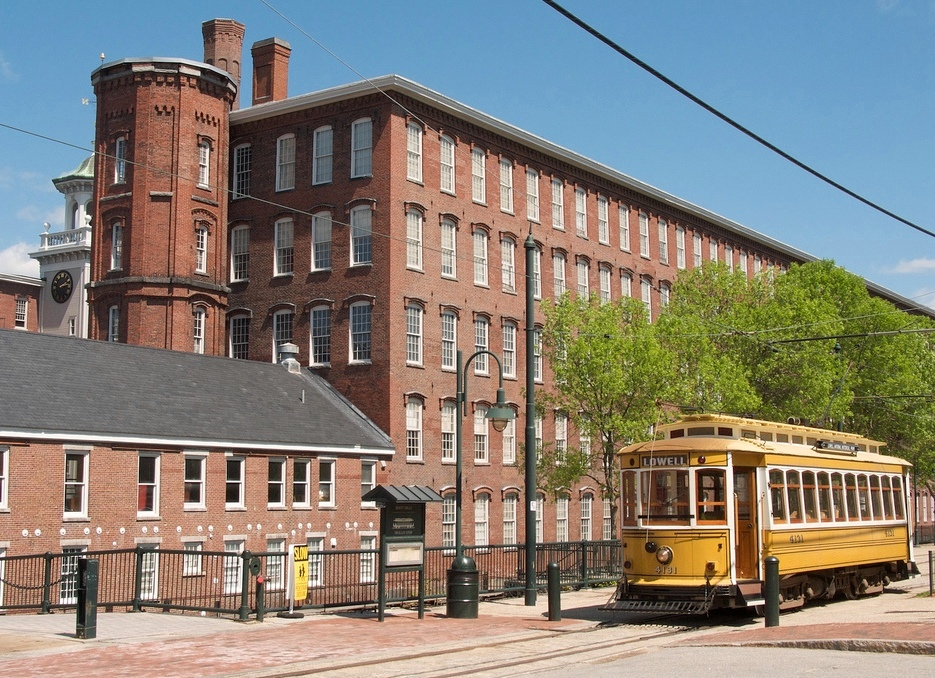
- One of the park trolleys outside the Boott Cotton Mill

Overview
- Locale: Lowell, Massachusetts
- Stations: 3

Service
- Type: Light rail
- Services: 1
- Operator(s): National Park Service

History
- Opened: 1984

Technical
- Track length: 1.2 miles
- Track gauge: 4 ft 8 1/2 in (1,435 mm) standard gauge
- Electrification: 600 V DC overhead catenary

The National Streetcar Museum is a streetcar museum and heritage railway located in Lowell, Massachusetts. It is owned by the New England Electric Railway Historical Society, which also operates the Seashore Trolley Museum, and is operated as part of the National Park Service's Lowell National Historical Park.

== History ==
Lowell, like many other cities in the country, formerly possessed an expansive network of trolleys, which served as the primary method of transit throughout the city. Trolley service in Lowell ended in 1935, and the last of the trolley trackage was removed during World War II.

In 1978, Lowell National Historical Park was established in order to preserve the image of the Industrial Revolution in Lowell. In 1984, the Park acquired one closed and two open trolleys, the former of which seats 48 passengers and the latter two of which seat up to 90 passengers. Because the original trolley trackage was removed, the trolleys run along the former Boston and Maine Railroad tracks.

== Route ==
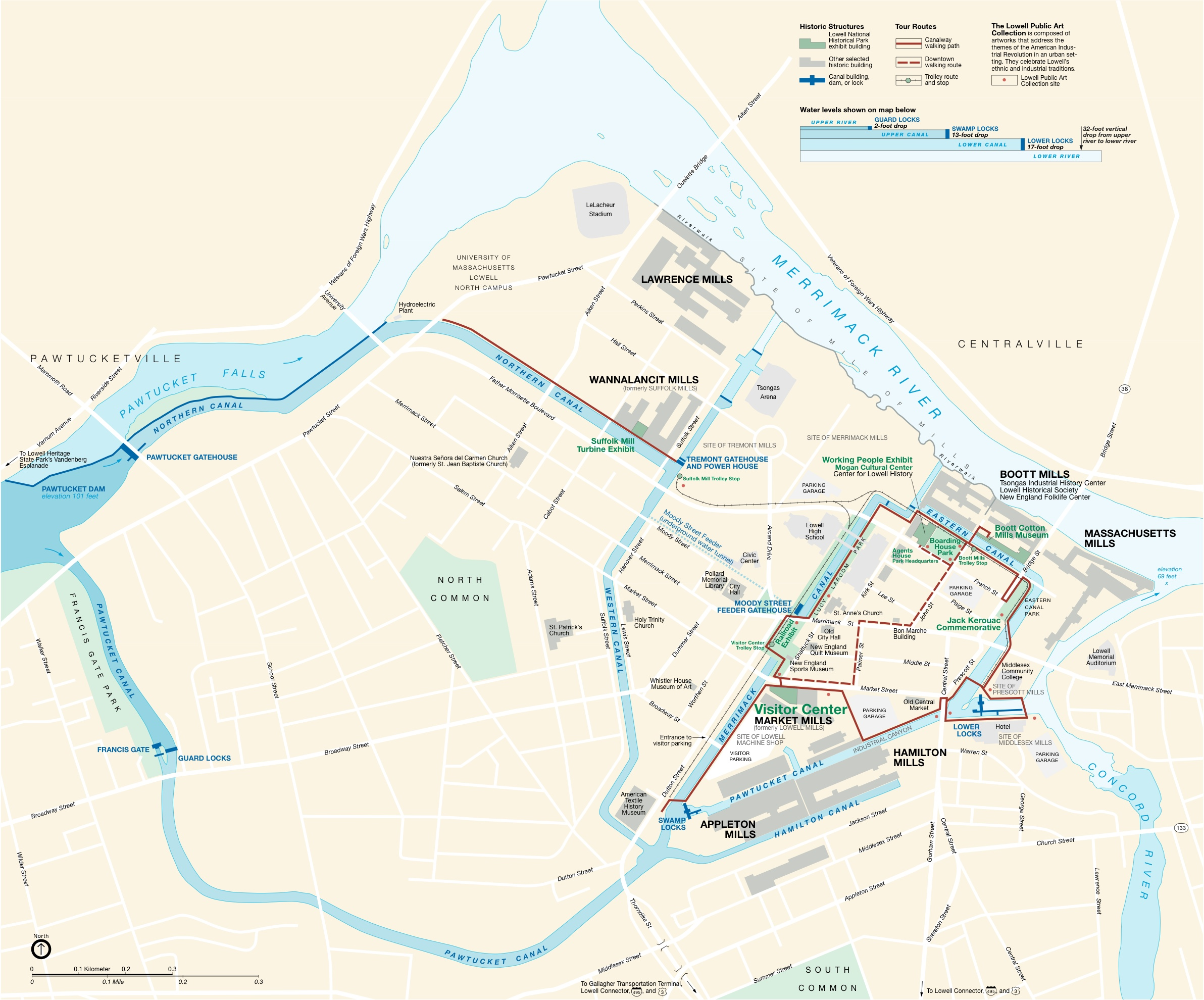
Map of the entire Park, with the trolley route visible in the center of the map.

The trolleys run daily from March to November, connecting the park to the downtown area of the city. Three regular stops are made, as well as several irregular stops upon passenger request.
