= Merrimac Town Forest =

Heavily forested area of the western half of the town of Merrimac, Massachusetts, USA

- Location within Massachusetts
- Interactive map of Merrimac Town Forest

Geography
- Location: Essex, United States
- Coordinates: 42°50′21″N 71°1′11″W

The Merrimac Town Forest is a heavily forested area of the western half of the town of Merrimac, Massachusetts, west of Merrimac Square and north of Interstate 495, which was set aside as a town forest.
