= Merrimacport, Massachusetts =

- Village
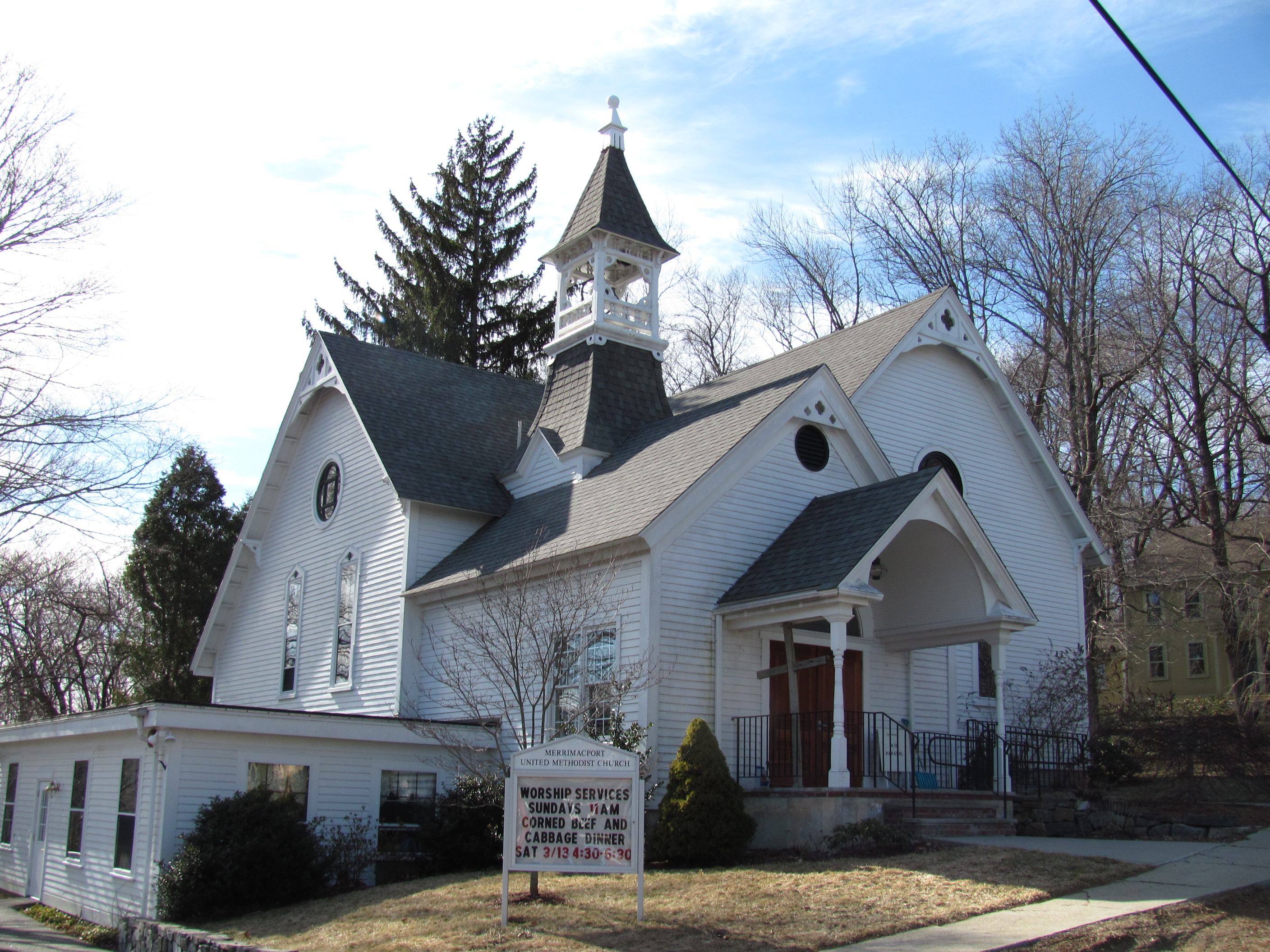
- Merrimacport United Methodist Church

- Location within Massachusetts Location within the United States
- Coordinates: 42°49′40″N 70°59′18″W
- Country: United States
- State: Massachusetts
- County: Essex
- Town: Merrimac
- Time zone: UTC-5 (Eastern)
- ZIP Code: 01860 (Merrimac)

Merrimacport is an unincorporated village and the oldest section of the town of Merrimac, in Essex County, Massachusetts, United States, located along the Merrimack River.

Settled in 1638, it began as a fishing village and was long a part of the section of Amesbury known as West Amesbury. During the Industrial Revolution, a nearby village developed around the newly formed Merrimac square. In 1876, West Amesbury, including Merrimacport (a.k.a. South Amesbury), split from Amesbury, incorporating itself as the town of Merrimac.

Merrimacport is divided from the rest of Merrimac by Interstate 495. It extends from the southern border of Amesbury to Locust Street.
