= G. Ellsworth Gale, Jr. =

American politician

Member of the Rhode Island Senate
- In office 1956–1964

Member of the Rhode Island House of Representatives
- In office 1954–1956

Personal details
- Born: George Ellsworth Gale Jr. July 28, 1899 Amesbury, Massachusetts, U.S.
- Died: November 23, 1972 (aged 73) East Greenwich, Rhode Island, U.S.
- Party: Republican
- Education: Brown University (BA); Harvard Business School (MBA)
- Occupation: Businessman, politician

G. Ellsworth Gale, Jr. (July 28, 1899 – November 23, 1972) was an American politician and lawyer in the state of Rhode Island. He served in the Rhode Island Senate from 1956 to 1964 and the Rhode Island House of Representatives from 1954 to 1956. He was a member of the Republican party.
