= Deer Island (Amesbury, Massachusetts) =

Island in Amesbury, Massachusetts, United States

Coordinates: 42°50′06″N 70°54′23″W

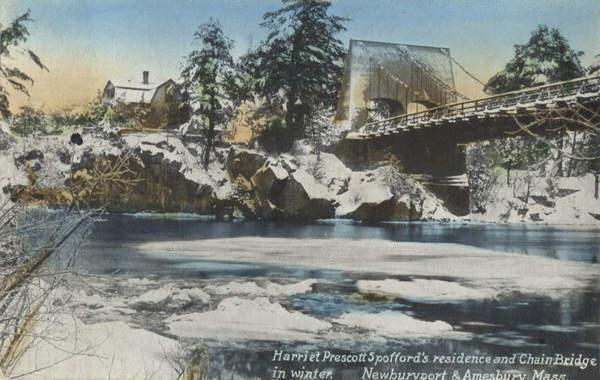
Residence of Harriet Elizabeth Prescott Spofford on Deer Island

Deer Island is a small island with only 1-2 residences, located in the Merrimack River in Amesbury, Massachusetts. The island connects to mainland Amesbury by way of the Derek S. Hines Memorial Bridge, and to neighboring Newburyport via Chain Bridge.
