= Circumstance (short story) =

1860 short story by Harriet Elizabeth Prescott Spofford

- Short story by Harriet Elizabeth Prescott Spofford
- Country: United States
- Language: English
- Genres: Allegorical short story, Gothic fiction

Publication
- Published in: The Atlantic Monthly
- Publication type: periodical
- Media type: Magazine
- Publication date: 1860

"Circumstance" is an allegorical short story written by American author Harriet Elizabeth Prescott Spofford. It was published in The Atlantic Monthly in 1860. The story takes place in the woods of Maine with an unnamed protagonist who walks home after caring for a sick neighbor. She ventures into the woods, where she comes in contact with the Indian Devil who assaults her throughout the story, but in this life-and-death situation she realizes her reality and religion and comes to terms with her life, sexuality, and fears. By the end of the story, her husband shoots the Devil with his shotgun in one hand and their baby in the other while the "true Indian Devils" destroy their home and town.

== Plot summary ==
An unnamed woman travels back to her home after caring for an ill neighbor in Maine and notices a white apparition floating in the air that sighs, "The Lord have mercy on the people!" She continues on until she reaches a point where a gap of fallen trees allows twilight to enter in the form of diffused light. Suddenly, a shadow races past her and before she knows it she is taken captive by the Indian Devil, a savage, legendary black panther. It grabs her and lifts her onto the bough of a tree.

She begins thinking of her husband, her best friend. Then, in an effort to call to her husband and save herself, she sings to the beast. As she does, the beast dances around and releases its firm grip around her, but it still keeps hold. Any time she pictures her husband or her child, she ceases from singing and the beast returns to its ferocious ways and tortures the woman.

As the beast continues to attack and subdue her, she begins to come to terms with her life and her religion. At first she questions God, but eventually realizes that if He feels it is her time to pass then she will accept that and accept that this is the way of nature.

Meanwhile, her husband, caring for their child, becomes exceedingly worried for her as she has been gone for much longer than expected. He soon decides to attempt an adventure into the woods, with his baby in one arm and his shotgun in the other.

Eventually, he finds his wife being assaulted by the panther and, after much planning for the perfect shot at the monster, he hits it dead on and the two fall, with it under her. The three embrace one another and return to their home, finding their community in complete desolation and its people dead from the 'true Indian Devils,' leaving the readers to the final line of the tale:

For the rest,—the world was all before them, where to choose.

== Background ==
This story was inspired by an actual occurrence that happened to Spofford's great-grandmother who, one night, was brutally attacked by a black panther.

Spofford lived during a time in which women had few career choices. The year before she was born, her father's business went bankrupt. In order to support herself she had no choice but to pursue a career in writing.

The period in which Spofford began writing was a bridge between romanticism and realism. Her writing, as illustrated in this story, was both romantic and fantastic. This period was also a time in which women were seen mostly in the household and women's writings were generally frowned upon.

== Analysis ==
This story takes place from sunset to the much later hours of the night, or liminal space, a term commonly seen in these forms of literature to represent the hour in which peculiar events are said to transpire.

Throughout the story the stereotype of "a woman's place is in her home" is represented and inverted. While the protagonist is lost in the wilderness, the husband is at the house—although the husband is the character who finally ends the cat while, the woman saves herself through seducing it. The beast can also be interpreted as the male and his unrestrained lust for the body of women.

To protect her being she is forced to sing and please the beast to prevent her death. Later, her husband comes around to save her by murdering the beast. But as they return to their home, they find out that their whole village has been destroyed by Native Americans, meaning that in fact the Indian Devil saves them from the "true Indian Devils" and death by holding the protagonist hostage, forcing the husband to travel with the child to save his wife.

Another major theme to this story is that the beast causes the woman to analyze her own sexuality, religion, fears, and existence in her life through its complete control over her. In this life-and-death situation she sees that both she and the panther derive from God and that all his children have inherited his love and kindness. She turns to God and understands that Nature is pure and what is meant to happen happens. She becomes one with Nature and thus becomes one with the beast.

This story also symbolizes the woman artist's oppression. Spofford was forced to write due to the women's stereotype and her family's poverty. And thus she got trapped in the world of journalism, similar to the protagonist who has no choice but to sing to please the Devil in order to stay alive. Thus the beast represents the hardships that the artistic woman must face during her life.

== See also ==
- 1860 in literature
- American Gothic fiction
