= Mary Newmarch Prescott =

American author and poet (1849–1888)

Mary Newmarch Prescott (1849–1888) was an American author and poet who became known as a popular magazine-writer in the 19th century. She contributed hundreds of sketches and poems to publications such as Our Young Folks and the periodicals of Scribner and Harper, and was the author of Matt's Follies, a juvenile tale, and Poems (1912). Prescott was born in Maine, and moved with her family to Massachusetts, where she spent most of her life. Her literary work reflects both her early start in writing and her focus on stories and poetry for young readers.

== Biography ==
Mary Newmarch Prescott was born in Calais, Maine, August 2, 1849.

Her parents were Joseph Newmarch Prescott (1807–1881) and Sarah Jane (Bridges) Prescott (1811–1883). Mary had several siblings, including the writer, Harriet Elizabeth Prescott Spofford, as well as Annie, William, Katherine, Otis, Edith, and Sarah. When Mary was still very young, the family removed to Newburyport, Massachusetts, Many notable people were allied with the Prescott family, including Sir William Pepperrell, John Brydges, 1st Baron Chandos, and the historian, William H. Prescott, while more recently, Secretary of State, William M. Evarts and the Hoar brothers, Ebenezer and George.

Her father, Joseph Prescott, was then a lumber merchant in Calais; afterward, he studied and practised law. In 1849, he became attracted by the Pacific coast, and, leaving his family in their Maine home, went out among the host of California Gold Rush pioneers to seek his fortune. He was one of the founders of Oregon City, Oregon, and three times elected its mayor. In the midst of strenuous work, he developed lingering paralysis, that made him an invalid for life.

At the age of 15, she published the first of the hundreds of sketches and poems. Her writings were almost entirely confined to the magazines of the day. Her contributions to Our Young Folks and the several publications of the Scribners and Harpers were well-regarded by her readers. Matt's Follies was her only published volume.

== Death and legacy ==
Mary Newmarch Prescott died June 14, 1888, in Newburyport, Massachusetts.

Her biographer, Elizabeth K. Halbeisen, published Harriet Prescott Spofford: A Romantic Survival in 2017.

== Selected works ==
- Matt's Follies: And Other Stories, 1896 (text)
- The Pet of the Family: Stories, Sketches, Poems and Pictures for the Youth (with Mrs. D. P. Sanford, Clara Doty Bates, Emily Huntington Miller), 1896 (text)
- Poems, 1912 (text)
