= Lake Attitash =

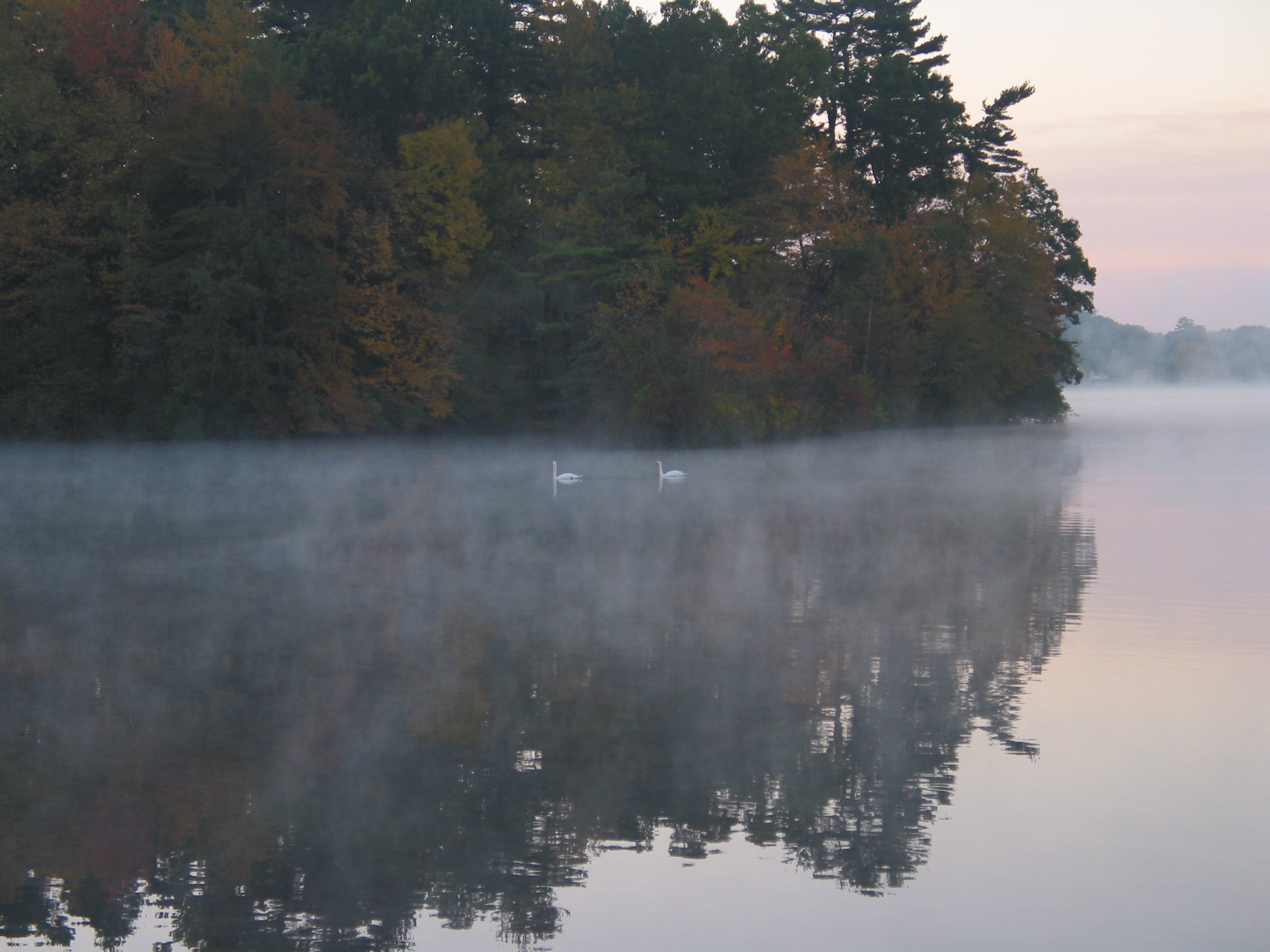
- Lake Attitash

- Location within Massachusetts Location within the United States
- Location: Merrimac, Massachusetts, and Amesbury, Massachusetts, United States
- Coordinates: 42°50′58″N 70°58′52″W
- Type: Reservoir
- Basin countries: United States
- Surface area: 360 acres (150 ha)
- Max. depth: 35 ft (11 m)
- Surface elevation: 95 ft (29 m)
- Dam: Lake Attitash Dam

Lake Attitash is a lake located on the border of Merrimac, Massachusetts, and Amesbury, Massachusetts, and constitutes at least a portion of Amesbury's water supply.

There are beaches on both the Amesbury and Merrimac shores. Merrimac's beach is known as Indian Head Park. The lake was formerly known as "Kimball's Pond". Its name was changed to reflect its reputed indigenous name of Attitash, meaning huckleberry.

The lake is popular with seasonal tourists, as well as residents. It is normally safe for swimming. Boats are allowed on the lake.

This shallow, 360-acre (1.5 km^{2}) enlarged natural great pond has a maximum depth of 30 feet (9.1 m) and an average depth of 11 feet (3.4 m). The shoreline is extensively developed; roads and cottages, two or three rows deep in places, virtually ring the entire lake, as well as a summer boys' camp, and at least two boat docks. There are literally hundreds of boats of all types and sizes. The only significant weed beds are located in the inlet and outlet coves.

Public access for boating has been created by the Massachusetts Office of Fishing and Boating Access (formerly known as the Public Access Board) by constructing a parking lot and launching ramp. The parking lot can accommodate nearly two dozen vehicles.

The last fisheries survey – conducted in 1978 – located nine of the 11 species known to be present in this water. Largemouth bass and chain pickerel are common and appear at least moderately fished. Pumpkinseeds dominate the fishery, although white perch and brown bullhead are very common.

Northern pike were stocked here in 1979, 1985, 1986 and 1988, and will continue to be stocked in the future.

Although Attitash is a good largemouth bass and chain pickerel water, it is primarily known as one of the best northern pike waters in the Northeast District. Pike in excess of 20 pounds have been reported here.

The heavy recreational use this lake supports during the summer months largely precludes fishing. Bass and panfish anglers enjoy good action during the spring and fall months, and ice fishermen avidly pursue the pike resource in winter. Fishing pressure is particularly high during the winter. Various local tournaments often bring out crowds of ice fishermen on weekends.
