= Amesbury Friends Meeting House =

Historic church in Massachusetts, United States

- U.S. National Register of Historic Places
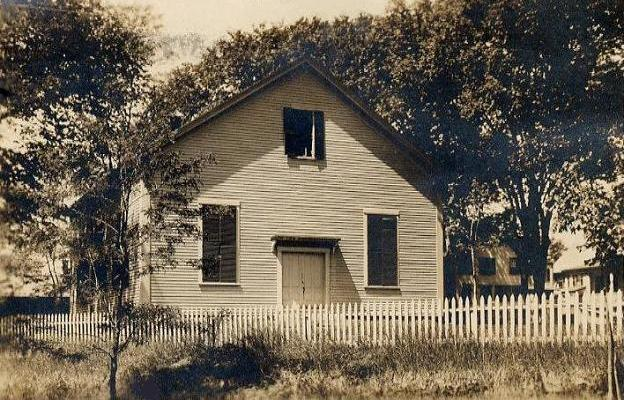
- Postcard view, 1911

- Location within Massachusetts Location within the United States
- Location: 120 Friend St., Amesbury, Massachusetts
- Coordinates: 42°51′18″N 70°56′19″W
- Built: 1850
- Architect: Thomas W. Thorndike
- Architectural style: Greek Revival
- NRHP reference No.: 02000376
- Added to NRHP: April 18, 2002

The Amesbury Friends Meetinghouse is a Friends meeting house at 120 Friend Street in Amesbury, Massachusetts. Built in 1850 under the guidance of John Greenleaf Whittier, it is home to one of the leading Quaker congregations of the region, and historically hosted quarterly meetings for Quakers from across eastern Massachusetts and southeastern New Hampshire. The meetinghouse was listed on the National Register of Historic Places in 2002.

== Architecture and history ==
The Amesbury Friends Meetinghouse is located west of downtown Amesbury, on the south side of Friend Street, at the southwest corner of its junction with Greenleaf Street. It is a simple 1 1/2-story wood-frame building, with a gabled roof and clapboarded exterior. The main facade is three bays wide, with sash windows flanking a center entrance, and a smaller window in the gable above. The building sides each have three windows. The interior has a vestibule spanning the building width, leading to the main chamber, with a gallery above. The main chamber has movable partitions, which can be raised and lowered by means of pulleys. These facilitate both the conduct of services by the entire congregation, and the conduct of business meetings, which were historically segregated by sex.

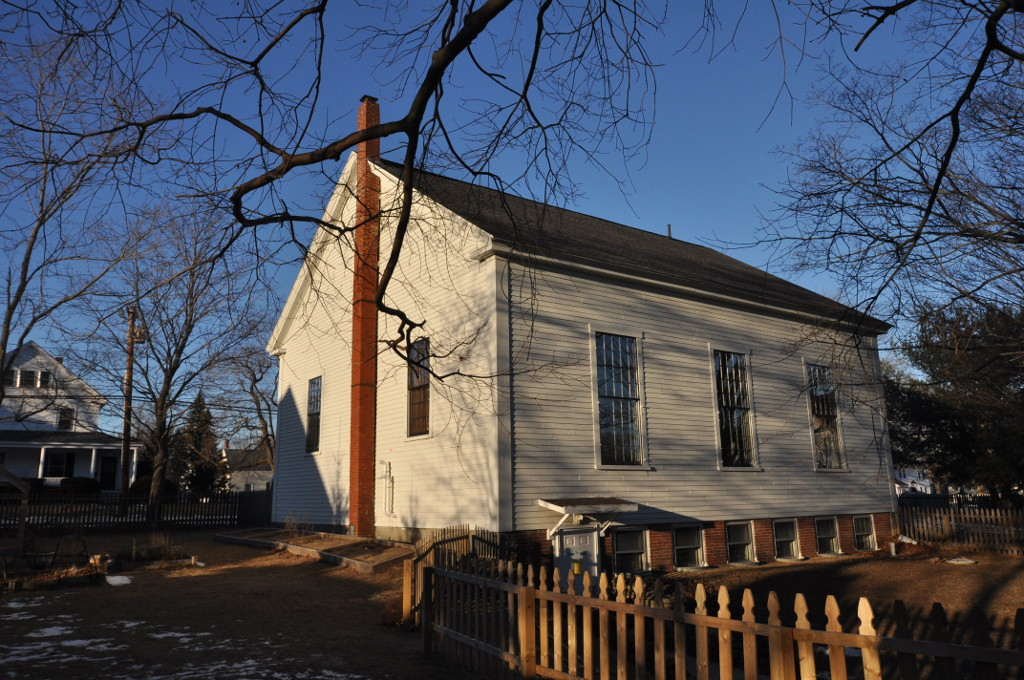
View in 2014

The Amesbury congregation of the Society of Friends is the oldest in northeastern Massachusetts, dating to 1657. Initially meeting in what is now southern New Hampshire to avoid persecution by the Puritan authorities of the Massachusetts Bay Colony, they built their first meeting house in 1705. The present building is their fourth, and was completed in 1851. The poet John Greenleaf Whittier, a member of long standing in the congregation and by then already well known, was a leading force on the building committee. The building's comparatively large size is a reflection of the congregation's importance as a host of the regional quarterly meetings. From 1851 to 1962, the meetinghouse hosted the Salem Quarterly meeting. The Amesbury Monthly Meeting of Friends is a current thriving congregation, with Meeting for Worship every Sunday at 10 AM. The facing bench displays a small plaque that reads, "Whittier's Bench."

== See also ==
- National Register of Historic Places listings in Essex County, Massachusetts
