= Lowell's Boat Shop =

- U.S. National Register of Historic Places
- U.S. National Historic Landmark
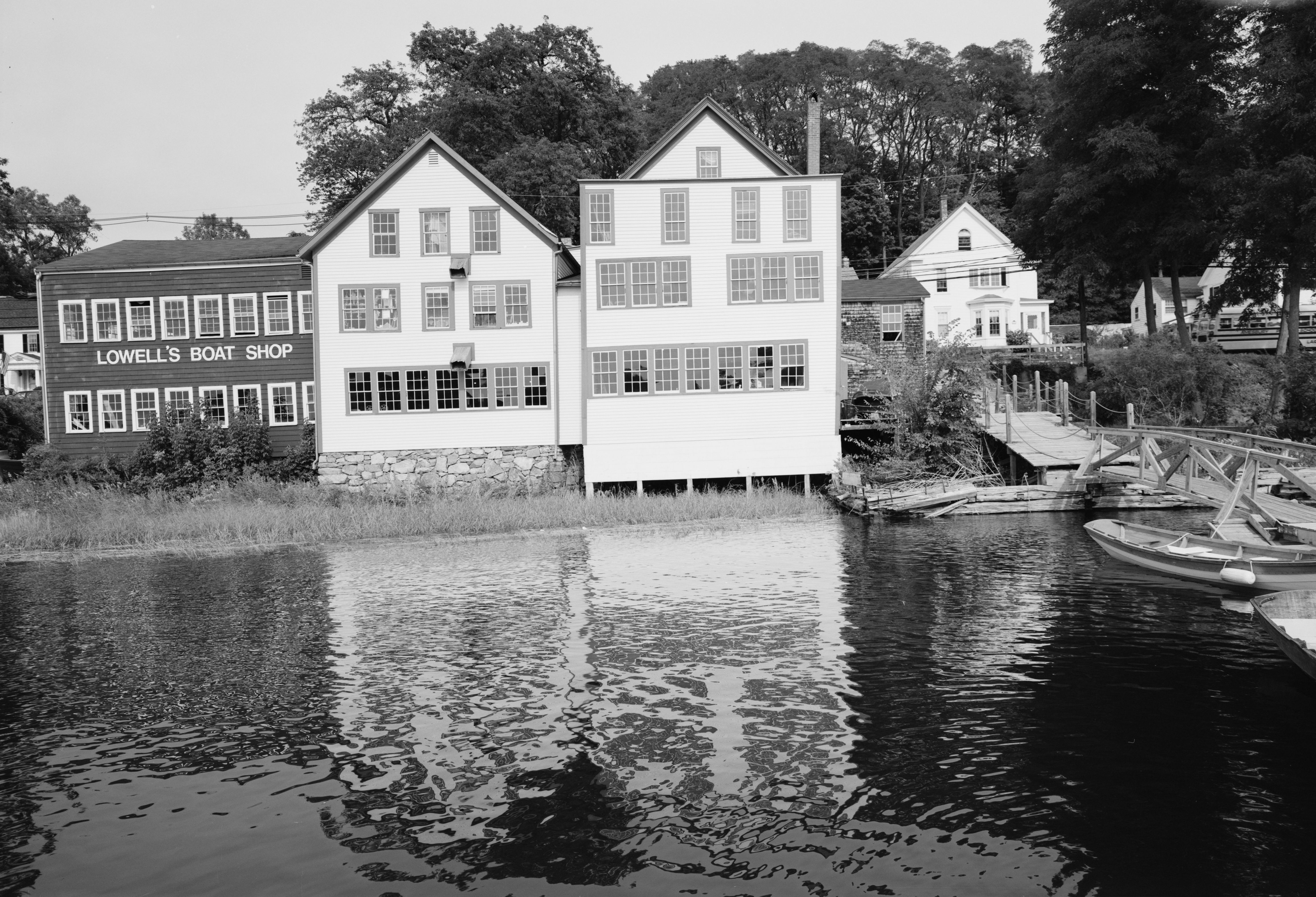

- Location within Massachusetts Location within the United States
- Location: Amesbury, Massachusetts
- Coordinates: 42°50′32″N 70°54′52″W
- Built: 1793
- Architect: Lowell, Simeon
- Architectural style: Federal
- NRHP reference No.: 88000706
- Added to NRHP: June 9, 1988

Lowell's Boat Shop (Hiram Lowell & Sons) is a National Historic Landmark at 459 Main Street in Amesbury, Massachusetts.

The shop was built in 1793 by Simeon Lowell. The building was added to the National Register of Historic Places in 1988.

Located on the banks of the Merrimack River, Lowell's Boat Shop is considered to be the birthplace of the legendary New England fishing dory, originated by Simeon Lowell. His grandson, Hiram, further developed the dory into the simplified Banks dory design that became a mainstay of New England's fishing fleets. An historian remarked, "A Lowell's dory to a fisherman was like a hammer to a carpenter". Hiram also created a seminal form of assembly line production that made Lowell's the world's preeminent dory manufacturer of its day. It is said to have greatly influenced Henry Ford's mass production processes. Within the boat shop's buildings remain such interesting historic features as ancient ship's knees and heavily worn floorboards, and two centuries of accumulated paint coat the floors. The oldest buildings remaining on the site are combined Greek Revival structures that were built in the 1860s. A cross-beam features annual production figures, branded into the wood from 1897 through 1919, reveal that 2,029 boats were built here, by hand, in the single year of 1911. Lowell's Boat Shop is also a rare survivor of the many various industries for which the Merrimack River Valley region was known.

By the early 1990s, it was decided that the boat shop had to function as a charitable institution to insure its continued operation. To facilitate this transition, The Trust for Public Land helped form the Lowell's Boat Shop Trust and purchased the property. In 1994, the Trust for Public Land granted a preservation easement over the property to the National Trust for Historic Preservation. The Newburyport Maritime assumed ownership of the shop in 1994.

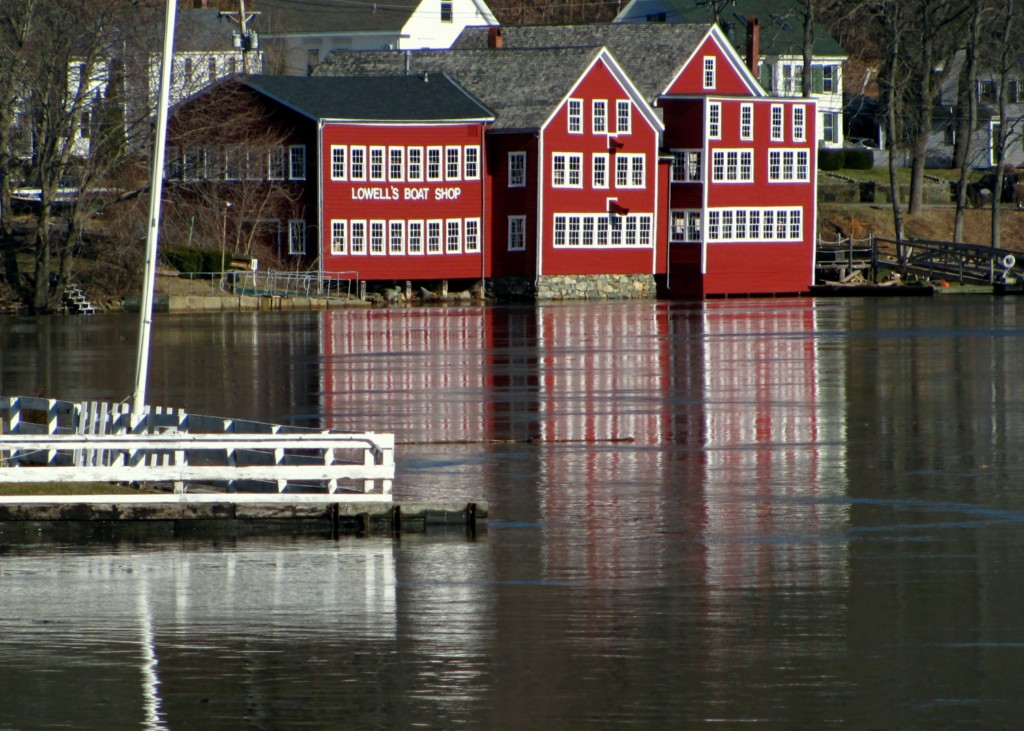
Boat Shop in 2010

Today, Lowell's Boat Shop is a working boat shop and living museum. The shop continues to build dories and skiffs in the tradition of the seven generations of the Lowell family. Its rich history is conveyed through boat building classes, model dory classes, apprenticeships, onsite programs for scouts, local schools and at-risk youth. Lowell's Boat Shop actively encourages boat building, tourism and maritime fine arts with affiliations with a variety of government agencies and non-profit organizations. During the boating season, members are able to row Lowell's dories as a part of the Members Open Waterfront Program. The Boat Shop is fully accessible to the handicapped and guided tours are offered by appointment.

In 2012, Lowell's Boat Shop was chosen to participate in an historic project for America's last extant whale ship, the Charles W. Morgan. A group of local high school apprentices have assisted in the construction of an historically accurate Beetle-design whaleboat replica, which will accompany the Charles W. Morgan when her restoration is complete.

== See also ==
- List of the oldest buildings in Massachusetts
- List of National Historic Landmarks in Massachusetts
- National Register of Historic Places listings in Essex County, Massachusetts
