= Merrimac, Massachusetts =

- Town
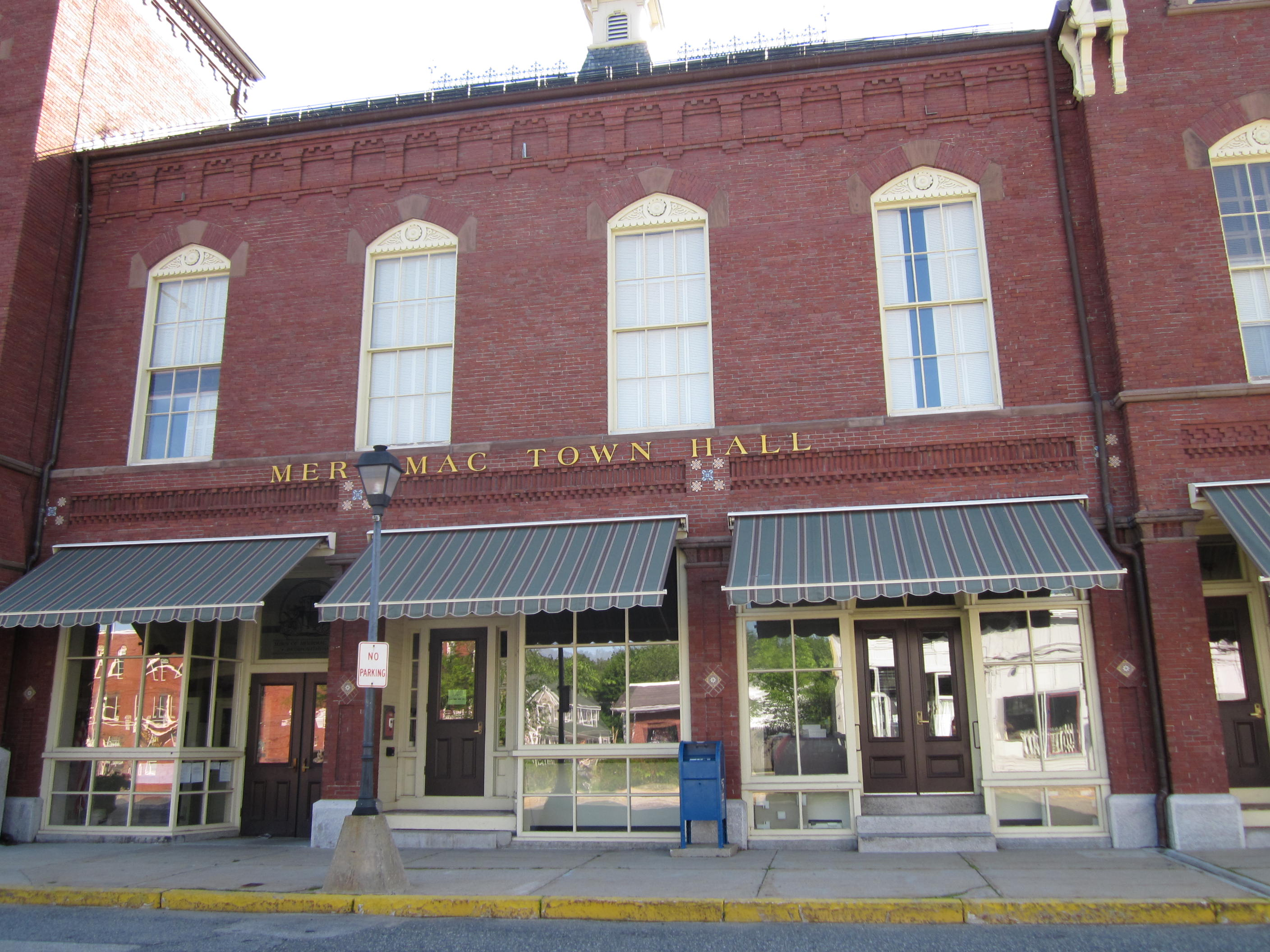
- Merrimac Town Hall near Merrimac Square

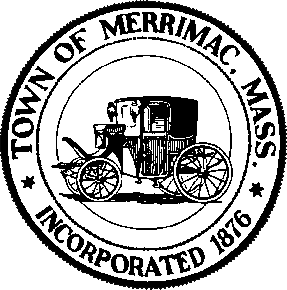
- Seal

- Location in Essex County and the state of Massachusetts.
- Coordinates: 42°49′50″N 71°00′10″W
- Country: United States
- State: Massachusetts
- County: Essex
- Settled: 1638
- Incorporated: 1876

Government
  - Type: Open town meeting
  - Select Board: Chris Manni (Chair); Janet M. Bruno (Clerk); Robert L. Gustison II; Wayne Adams; Irina Gorzynski

Area
  - Total: 8.8 sq mi (22.9 km^{2})
  - Land: 8.5 sq mi (21.9 km^{2})
  - Water: 0.39 sq mi (1.0 km^{2})
- Elevation: 108 ft (33 m)

Population (2020)
  - Total: 6,723
  - Density: 795/sq mi (307/km^{2})
- Time zone: UTC-5 (Eastern)
  - Summer (DST): UTC-4 (Eastern)
- ZIP code: 01860
- Area code: 351 / 978
- FIPS code: 25-40430
- GNIS feature ID: 0618301
- Website: townofmerrimac.com

Merrimac is a small town in Essex County, Massachusetts, United States, located on the southeastern border of New Hampshire, approximately 34 miles (55 km) northeast of Boston and 10 miles (16 km) west of the Atlantic Ocean. It was incorporated on April 11, 1876. It is situated along the north bank of the Merrimack River in the Merrimack Valley. The population was 6,723 at the 2020 census. Historically a mill town, it has long since become a largely residential community. It is part of the Greater Boston metropolitan area.

== History ==
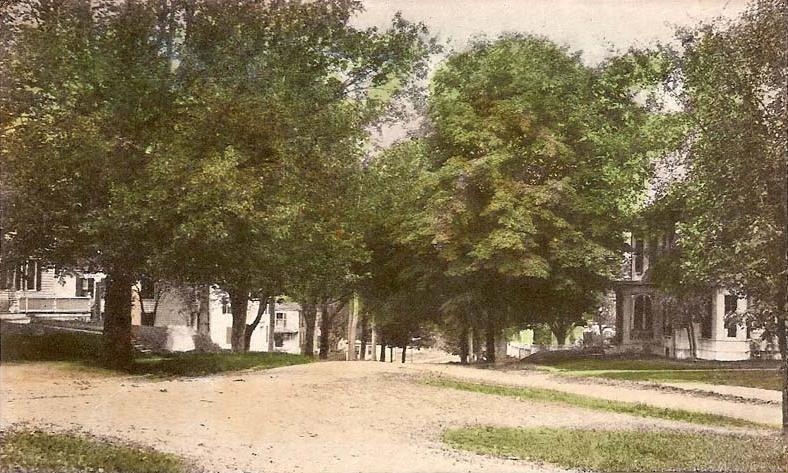
Merrimac Street in 1911

Settled by the English in 1638 as a part of Salisbury and later as a part of Amesbury around the village of Merrimacport, it was known throughout the seventeenth and eighteenth centuries as an agricultural and fishing community, with a small amount of shipbuilding. When Amesbury separated from Salisbury in 1666, Merrimac was referred to as the West Parish of Amesbury, or simply West Amesbury, although it was unincorporated. When a border dispute between the Massachusetts and New Hampshire colonies was settled in 1741, the new border sliced off the parts of Amesbury that were further from the Merrimack River, with the area then associated with West Amesbury becoming the "new town" of Newton, New Hampshire.

In 1771, the West Parish of Amesbury (present-day Merrimac) had a population of at least four enslaved Africans. They were held in bondage by town residents Isaac Merrill, Benjamin Morse, and Wells Chase. At least one former enslaved African, "Forte," who was sold by an unknown West Newbury slaver to Christopher Sargent, became locally famous for his fiddling after the abolition of slavery in Massachusetts.

In the nineteenth century, benefiting from a manufacturing boom following the establishment of some of the first planned industrial cities in the United States, nearby Lawrence and Lowell, Merrimac came to be known worldwide for its horse-drawn carriage industry. During this period, the town proper of Merrimac, centered around Merrimac Square, expanded separately from the village of Merrimacport. In 1876, Merrimac, including Merrimacport, separated from Amesbury and officially incorporated itself as a town. It is believed that the town, as well as the river that runs along its southern border, are both named for the American Indian tribe that occupied the region. "Merrimac" (or Merrimack) means "swift water place" in the language of this tribe. This town center consists of the typical brick buildings and Victorian architecture of the late nineteenth century, and it is surrounded by much of the town's population. Interstate 495 now divides Merrimacport from Merrimac. At the beginning of the twentieth century, as with the rest of the New England, it went through a period of deindustrialization as the region's industry relocated to the Midwest. The communities of the Merrimack Valley, including Merrimac, were particularly affected by this long period of economic decline and have never fully recovered.

Today, Merrimac is a typical small New England community. It went through numerous growth spurts throughout the 1990s and the beginning of the twenty-first century as it was absorbed into the Lawrence metropolitan area.

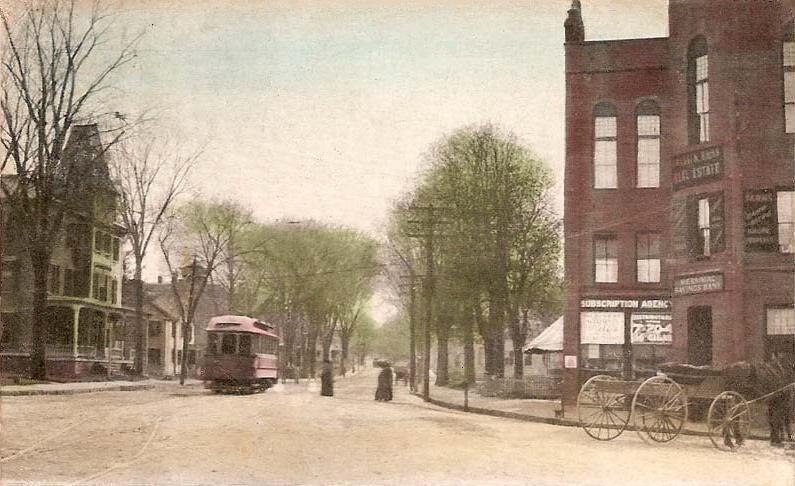
Merrimac Square in 1911

== Geography ==
According to the United States Census Bureau, the town has a total area of 8.8 square miles (22.9 km^{2}), of which 8.5 square miles (21.9 km^{2}) is land and 0.39 square miles (1.0 km^{2}), or 4.48%, is water. Merrimac is drained by the Merrimack River, whose north bank the town lies on. Located in the Merrimack River Valley and on the coastal plain of Massachusetts, Merrimac's land consists mainly of small, forested hills (before the twentieth century, it was mostly pasture). The town also has several ponds, streams and Lake Attitash (which is located partially in Merrimac, and partially in neighboring Amesbury).

Merrimac is roughly diamond-shaped, and is bordered by Amesbury and Lake Attitash to the northeast, West Newbury to the southeast, Haverhill to the southwest, Newton, New Hampshire, to the north and northwest, South Hampton, New Hampshire, to the far northeast, and Plaistow, New Hampshire, on the western corner. The town is 14 miles (23 km) northeast of Lawrence, 30 miles (48 km) southeast of Manchester, New Hampshire, and 34 miles (55 km) north of Boston. Merrimac lies along Interstate 495, with Exit 115 (old exit 53) giving access to the town. Massachusetts Route 110 also passes through the town, just north of I-495. There are no bridges crossing the Merrimack directly into the town; the Rocks Village Bridge lies just to the south of town in Haverhill, and the nearest downstream crossing is the Whittier Memorial Bridge in Amesbury.

== Demographics ==
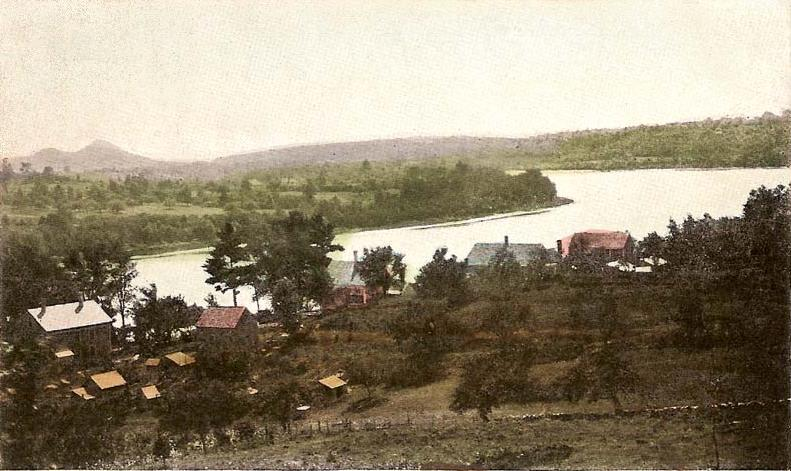
Merrimacport village in 1911

Historical population
Year	Pop.	±%
1880	2,237	—
1890	2,633	+17.7%
1900	2,131	−19.1%
1910	2,202	+3.3%
1920	2,173	−1.3%
1930	2,392	+10.1%
1940	2,320	−3.0%
1950	2,804	+20.9%
1960	3,261	+16.3%
1970	4,245	+30.2%
1980	4,451	+4.9%
1990	5,166	+16.1%
2000	6,138	+18.8%
2010	6,338	+3.3%
2020	6,723	+6.1%
2022*	6,699	−0.4%
* = population estimate.

As of the 2020 United States census, there were 6,723 people residing in the town, up from 6,338 at the 2010 census. The population density was 791.0 inhabitants per square mile (305.4/km^{2}), based on a land area of 8.50 square miles (22.0 km^{2}).

According to the U.S. Census Bureau's 2020–2024 American Community Survey estimates, there were 2,815 households in the town, with an average household size of 2.39 people. The population was 16.5% under the age of 18 and 26.7% age 65 or older. Females made up 45.7% of the population.

The racial makeup of the town was 93.3% White alone, 0.0% Black or African American alone, 0.0% Native American alone, 0.5% Asian alone, and 6.1% from two or more races. Hispanic or Latino residents of any race were 2.4% of the population, while non-Hispanic White residents were 91.3%.

For the period 2020–2024, the median income for a household in the town was $123,054, and the per capita income for the town was $57,070. About 9.4% of the population was below the poverty line.

== Government ==
Merrimac is governed by the New England town meeting form of government, a kind of participatory direct democracy. Five residents are elected to the Select Board, the executive arm administering local government. But all major decisions, as well as many minor decisions, are handled during the town's annual town meeting, as well as special town meetings, if required. The Select Board of Merrimac has five seats as of May 2025, increased from three. The current Chair of the Board is Janet M. Bruno (2027), Robert L. Gustison II (2028) is the Clerk, and the other members-at-large are Gwen Lay Sabbagh (2028), Wayne Adams (2029), and Matt Passeri (2029).

Per the constitution of the Commonwealth of Massachusetts, any resident of Merrimac may introduce legislation with the support of 10 registered voters.

Merrimac is part of the Massachusetts Senate's 1st Essex district.

Merrimac presidential election results
Year	Democratic	Republican	Third parties	Total Votes	Margin
2020	58.05% 2,549	39.28% 1,725	2.66% 117	4,391	18.77%
2016	49.74% 1,895	42.57% 1,622	7.69% 293	3,810	7.17%
2012	51.53% 1,847	46.32% 1,660	2.15% 77	3,584	5.22%
2008	53.76% 1,918	43.47% 1,551	2.77% 99	3,568	10.29%
2004	52.70% 1,796	46.01% 1,568	1.29% 44	3,408	6.69%
2000	51.00% 1,537	40.94% 1,234	8.06% 243	3,014	10.05%
1996	56.22% 1,478	29.52% 776	14.26% 375	2,629	26.70%
1992	41.52% 1,117	31.15% 838	27.32% 735	2,690	10.37%
1988	50.22% 1,232	47.74% 1,171	2.04% 50	2,453	2.49%
1984	36.73% 753	62.93% 1,290	0.34% 7	2,050	26.20%
1980	33.25% 659	49.14% 974	17.61% 349	1,982	15.89%
1976	48.31% 945	48.26% 944	3.43% 67	1,956	0.05%
1972	39.71% 714	59.34% 1,067	0.95% 17	1,798	19.63%
1968	41.42% 717	52.63% 911	5.95% 103	1,731	11.21%
1964	58.69% 959	41.00% 670	0.31% 5	1,634	17.69%
1960	36.10% 601	63.90% 1,064	0.00% 0	1,665	27.81%
1956	21.17% 304	78.83% 1,132	0.00% 0	1,436	57.66%
1952	24.61% 363	75.32% 1,111	0.07% 1	1,475	50.71%
1948	34.01% 451	64.63% 857	1.36% 18	1,326	30.62%
1944	32.81% 375	66.93% 765	0.26% 3	1,143	34.12%
1940	32.97% 418	66.48% 843	0.55% 7	1,268	33.52%

== Education ==
The following schools in the Pentucket Regional School District serve the town of Merrimac. All regional schools, however, are located in neighboring West Newbury. Merrimac High School operated until 1958, but closed when Pentucket Regional High School opened.

- Frederick N. Sweetsir School – named for a doctor who practiced in Merrimac
- Helen R. Donaghue School – named for a former principal of the school
- Pentucket Regional Middle School
- Pentucket Regional High School

For high school, students also have the option of attending the following vocational/agricultural schools.

- Whittier Regional Vocational Technical High School
- Essex Agricultural and Technical High School

== Notable people ==
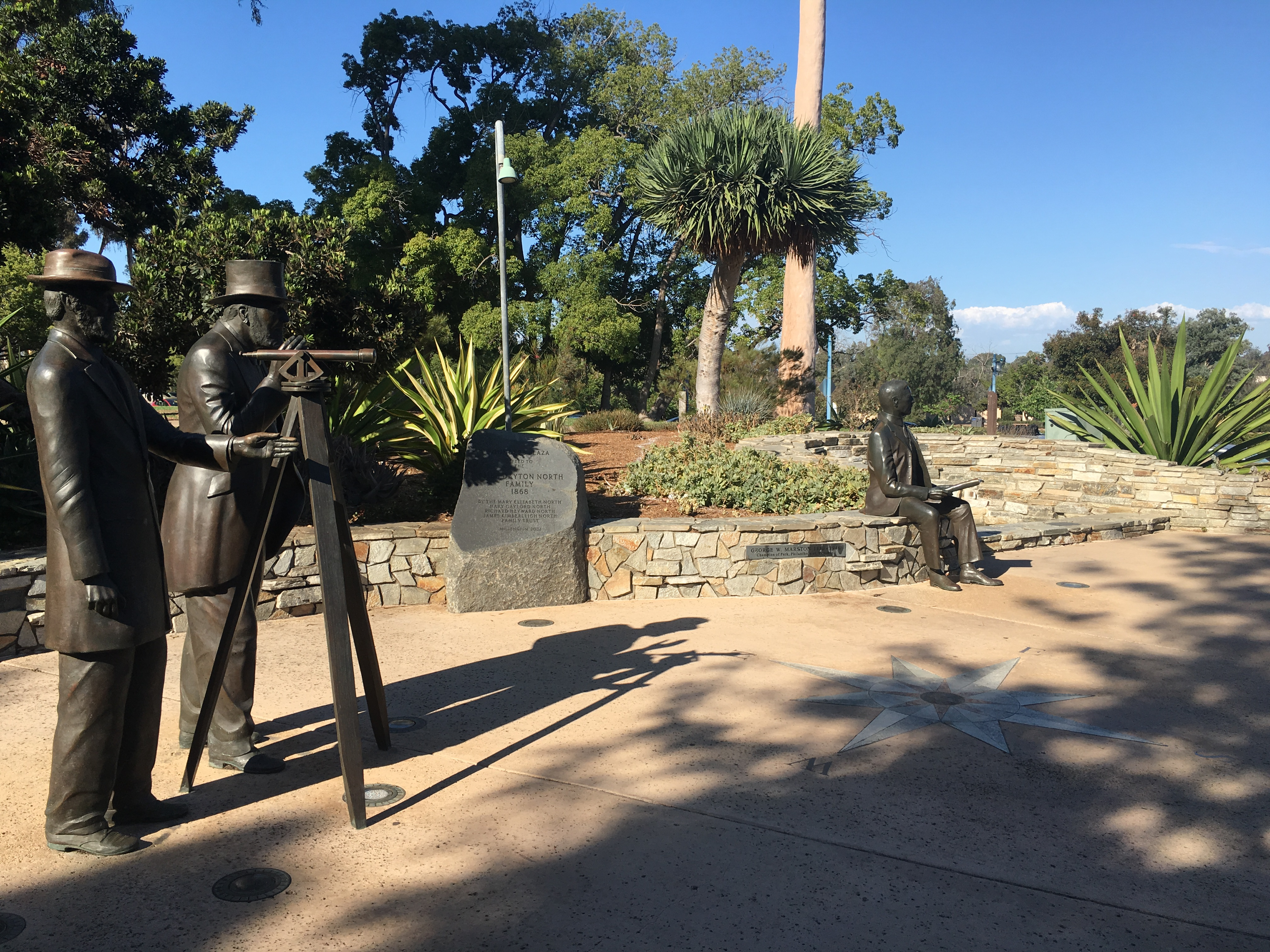
A statue of Merrimac native Ephraim Morse, far left, in Sefton Plaza of San Diego, California's Balboa Park, which he helped found and develop.

- Dennis Berran, outfielder for the Chicago White Sox
- Pat Freiermuth, Tight End for the NFL's Pittsburgh Steelers, drafted 55th overall in 2021
- Richard P. Gabriel, computer scientist known for his contributions to the Lisp programming language community
- Ephraim Morse, early settler of San Diego, California and one of the founders of Balboa Park
- Henry Boynton Smith, Presbyterian theologian
- Kevin J. Sullivan, Massachusetts politician and former mayor of Lawrence
- George W. Weymouth, Massachusetts politician and former U.S. Representative
- John Greenleaf Whittier, Poet and Activist

== Sites of interest ==
- Lake Attitash (and Indian Head Park)
- The Merrimac Public Library, which is part of the Merrimack Valley Library Consortium.
- Merrimac Square
- Merrimac Town Forest
- Merrimac Training Field
- Merrimacport

== Annual events ==
Merrimac is home to several regional events:

- The Merrimac Santa Parade
- Merrimac Old Home Days
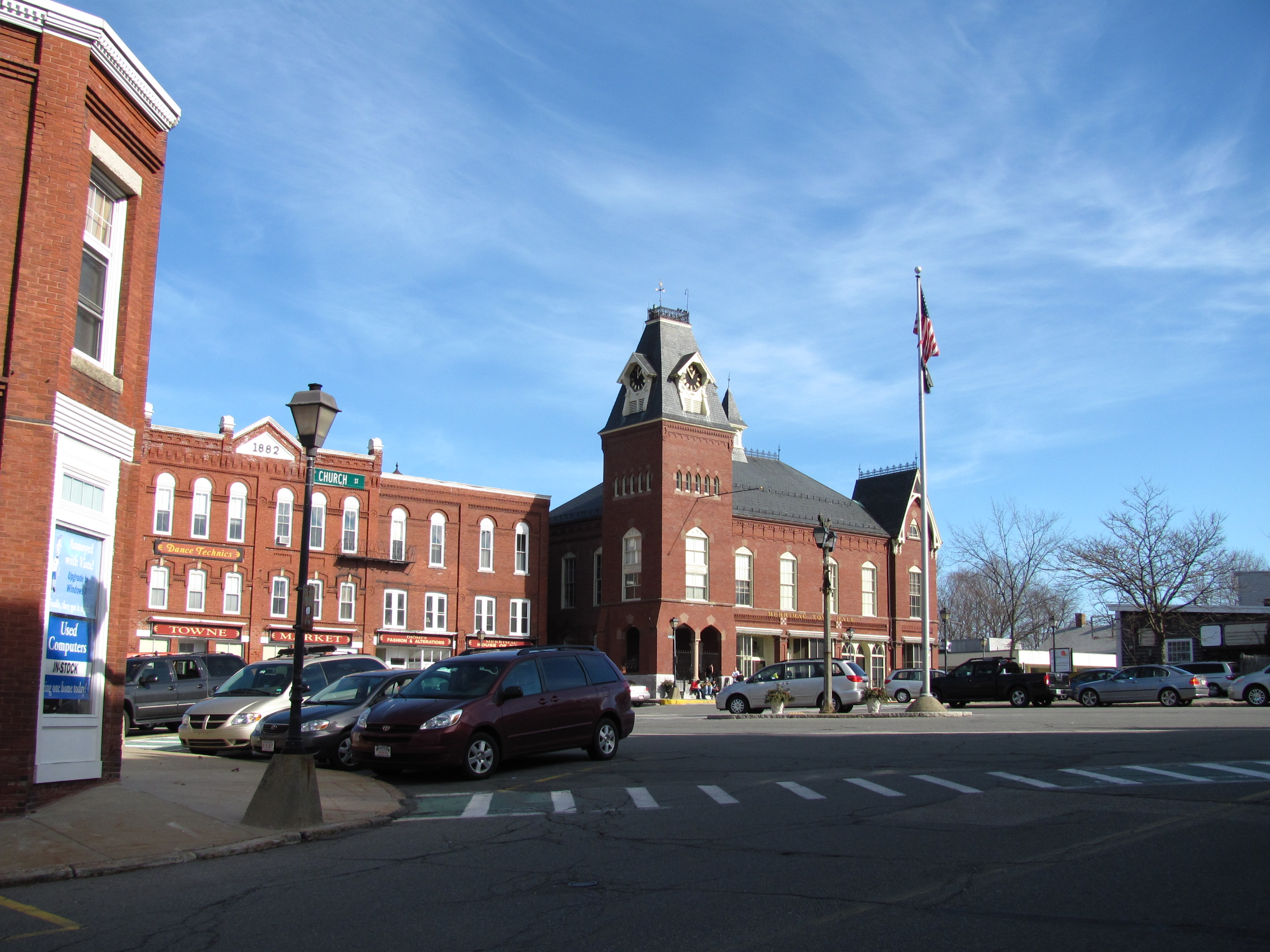
Town Hall on the Square

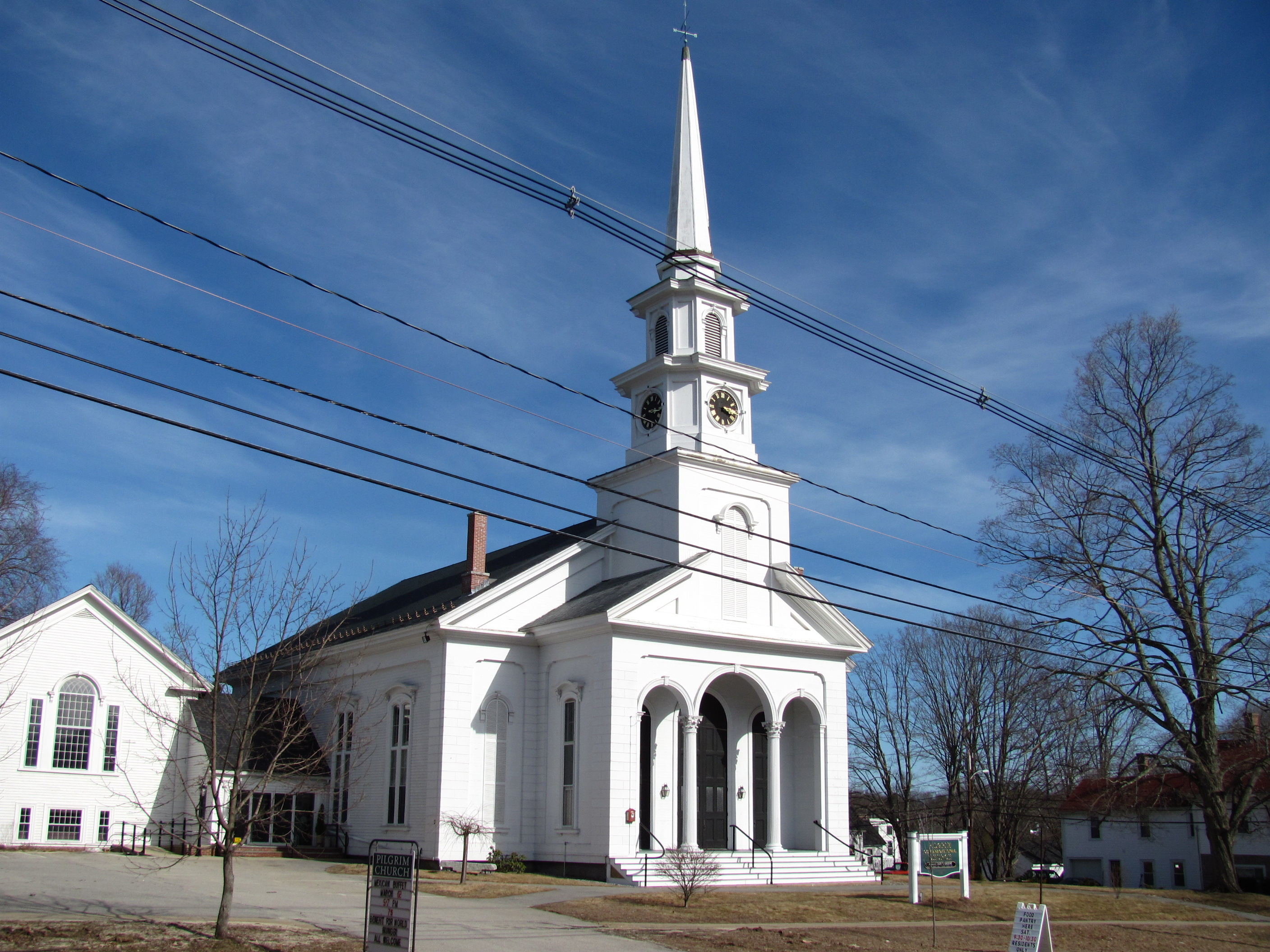
Pilgrim Congregational Church

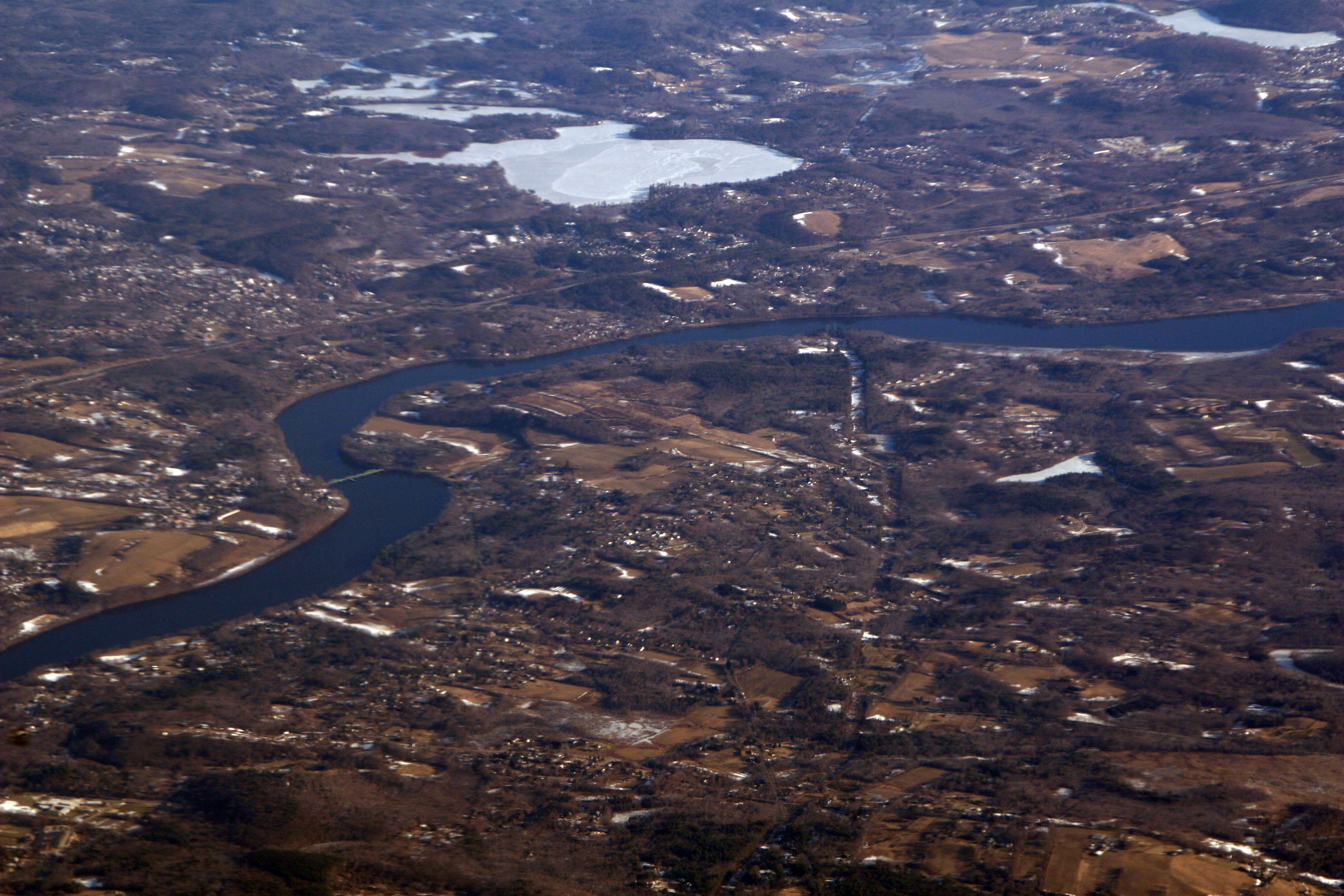
Aerial view of Merrimac and neighboring West Newbury
