= Esabalu =

- Village
- Location within Kenya
- Country: Kenya
- County: Kisumu County/Vihiga County

Government
  - Mayor: Tom Amakoye
- Elevation: 5,400 m (17,700 ft)

Population (Estimated)
  - Total: 8,500
  - Density: 1,000/km^{2} (2,600/sq mi)
- Time zone: UTC+3 (EAT)

Esabalu is a village located on the border of Vihiga and Kisumu counties in western Kenya.

== Geography ==
Esabalu is located approximately 5,400 feet above sea level, and lies directly on the equator. It receives about 40 inches of rainfall per year.

=== Climate ===
Under the Köppen climate classification system, Esabalu has an Equatorial Climate (Af).

== Demographics ==
There are approximately 8,500 residents in Esabalu. Most of them are members of the Luhya ethnic group. It is estimated that the population density is over 1,000 people per square kilometer. The three major languages spoken in Esabalu are Luhya, Swahili, and English.

== International relations ==
=== Twin towns – Sister cities ===
Esabalu is twinned with:

- Amesbury, Massachusetts, United States (since 1987)
