= Chain Bridge (Massachusetts) =

Bridge in Newburyport, Massachusetts, US

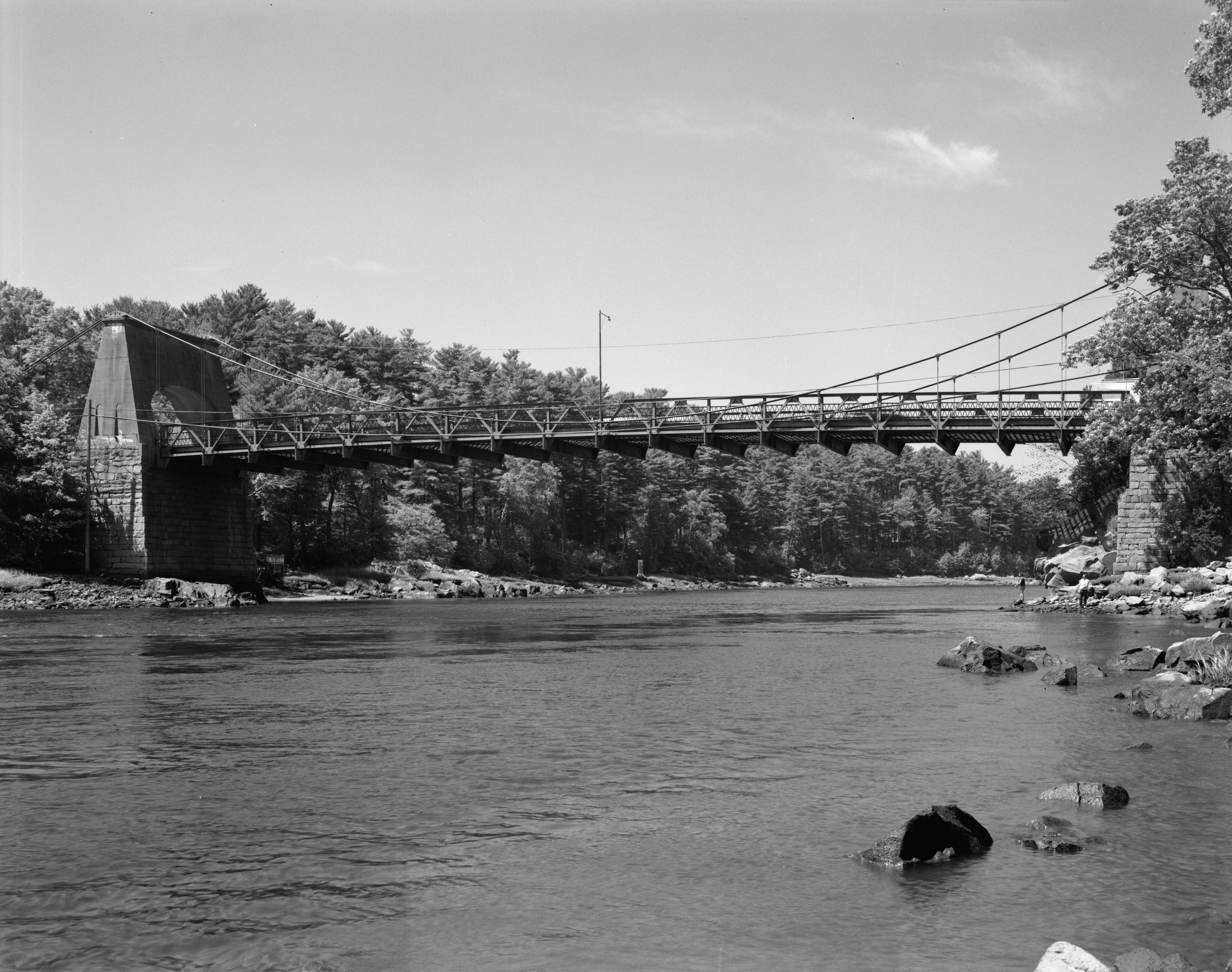
- Chain Bridge, 1990
- Coordinates: 42.8337°N 70.90674°W
- Carries: Vehicular and pedestrian traffic
- Crosses: Merrimack River
- Locale: Newburyport, Massachusetts
- Official name: Essex-Merrimac Bridge

Characteristics
- Design: Suspension bridge
- Longest span: 225 feet
- No. of spans: 1

History
- Designer: George Fillmore Swain & Robert R. Evans
- Construction start: 1909
- Construction end: 1910

Statistics
- Toll: No

The Chain Bridge in Newburyport, Massachusetts, is a "look-alike" replica built in 1910 to replace the "first suspension bridge" constructed in the United States in 1810. Since the current structure is one of a series of bridges at this location since 1793, it is "the oldest continually occupied, long span, bridge crossing" in the US. It has also been called the Essex-Merrimac Bridge or Newburyport Chain Bridge.

It is a 225-foot chain bridge, a single-span suspension bridge, which crosses the right branch of the Merrimack River as it flows around Deer Island. The boundary between the cities of Newburyport and Amesbury, Massachusetts, runs through Deer Island, so Chain Bridge connects the two communities. Crossing from the island to the left bank of the Merrimack requires traversing the Derek S. Hines Memorial Bridge, formerly the Essex-Merrimack Drawbridge, which was reconstructed and reopened in August 2012. As the Chain Bridge is better known because of its structure, it is sometimes incorrectly identified as a single bridge spanning the Merrimack.

== History ==
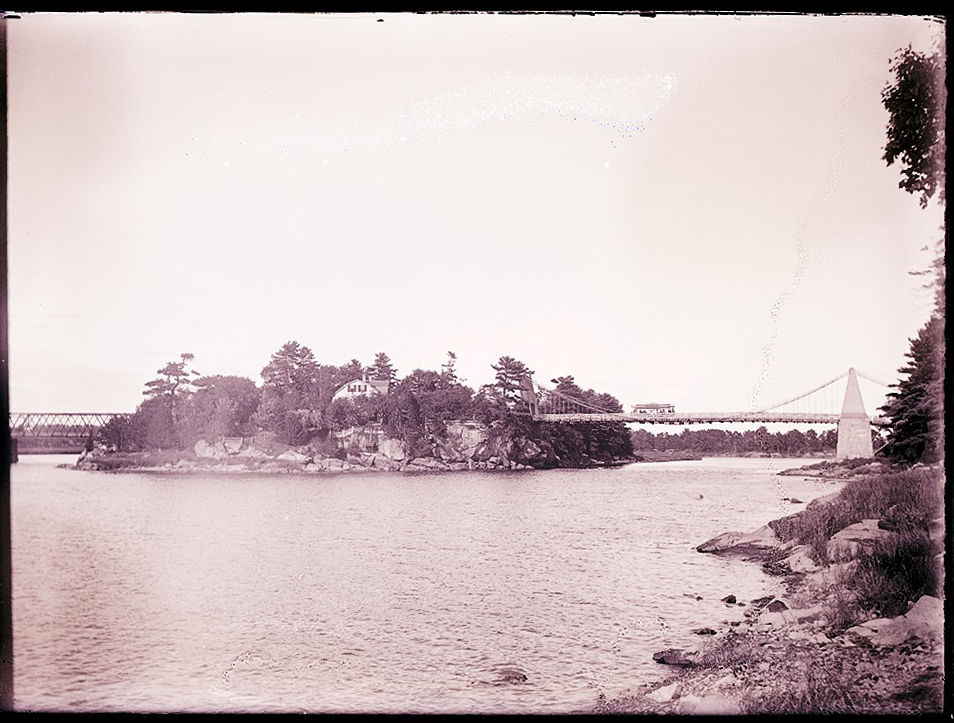
Early-1900s photograph of the bridge with a trolley crossing

The first timber-arch truss bridge was constructed in 1792 to designs by Timothy Palmer, a local architect, using an arch he designed to mimic stone voussoir construction in wood, which he patented as "Palmer's arch". The cost was more than $36,000, and the bridge charged tolls. It was deemed unsafe in 1809, and the timber was auctioned.

It was replaced in 1810 by a wrought-iron chain suspension bridge. James Finley, a Pennsylvania engineer, patented the chain construction in 1808. Using his designs, he built a bridge, since destroyed, over the Schuylkill River that year. This bridge operated as a toll bridge until 1868, when it was purchased by Essex County and opened to public access without charge. Scientific American reported in 1896 that it was "the solitary specimen in New England of a style of suspension bridge that has served its intentions admirably, and may still be found preferable to the wire bridges under certain circumstances". (Note: "The chain Bridge lately thrown over the Merrimack, three miles above Newburyport, in the state of Massachusetts, is now in constant use. This Bridge consists of a single arc, two hundred and forty-four feet span. The abutments are of stone, forty-seven feet long, and thirty-seven high; the uprights, or framed work, which stand on the abutments, are thirty-five feet high, over which are suspended ten distinct chains, the ends of which on both sides of the river are buried deep in pits and secured by large stones: each chain is five hundred and sixteen feet long; and, where they pass over the uprights, they are treble, and made in short links, which is said to be more secure than saddles made of plates of iron. The four middle joists rest on the chains; all the rest are suspended to the main chains to equalize the floor. This Bridge has two passage-ways of fifteen feet in width each, and the floor is so solid as to admit of horses, carriages, etc. to travel at any speed, with very little perceptible motion of the floors. The railing is stout and strong, which adds much firmness to the floor. There are three chains in each range on each side, and four in the middle range: they are calculated to support nearly five hundred tons. From the surface of the water to the middle of the floor is forty feet; and from the top of the abutments to the top of the uprights is thirty-five feet high, making seventy-two feet. The magnitude and power of the abutments, the width and length of the floors, the elevation of the work, the evident powers of the chains, etc. all conspire to make it a wonderful work. Every expense attending it did not amount to twenty-five thousand dollars. The abutment being of stone, the uprights covered, and the chains painted to prevent rust, leaves nothing but the flooring to decay. This Bridge was constructed by John Templeman, Esq. of the district of Columbia, whose talents for the productions of such work, and the various improvements suggested and used by him, have been highly beneficial, and do him great credit.")

This was replaced by the current span, which was completed in 1910 at the site of the two earlier bridges. The construction materials were almost entirely new. It is still referred to as "Chain Bridge", and its predecessor as "Old Chain Bridge".

The Chain Bridge is the only suspension bridge currently maintained by the Massachusetts Department of Transportation. In 1990 the bridge was part of a statewide survey as part of the Massachusetts Historic Bridge Recording Project. It has undergone several renovations, most recently in 2003.
