= Briggs Carriage Company =

- U.S. National Register of Historic Places
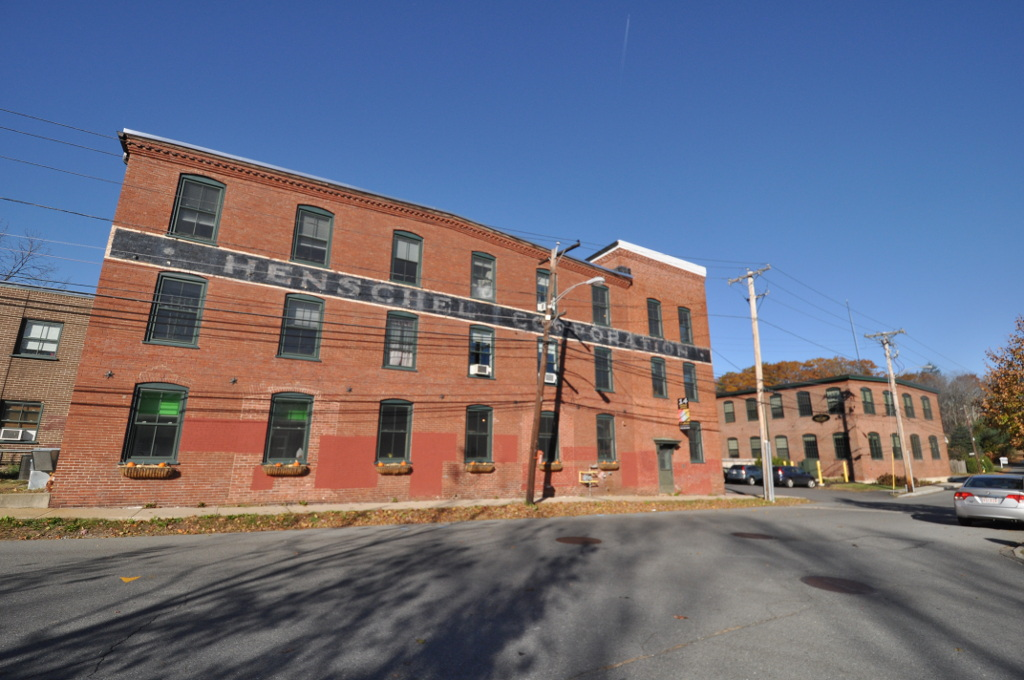

- Location within Massachusetts Location within the United States
- Location: 14 and 20 Cedar St., Amesbury, Massachusetts
- Coordinates: 42°51′41″N 70°55′40″W
- NRHP reference No.: 100000822
- Added to NRHP: April 3, 2017

The Briggs Carriage Company is a historic industrial complex at 14 and 20 Cedar Street in Amesbury, Massachusetts. Built before 1890, these two buildings are a surviving reminder of the city's late 19th century prominence as a major carriage manufacturing center. They were listed on the National Register of Historic Places in 2007.

== Description and history ==
The two surviving Briggs Carriage Company buildings stand north of downtown Amesbury, on the north side of Cedar Street west of Poplar Street and the Back River. They are two long rectangular buildings, built in brick in the commercial Italianate style typical of 19th-century textile mills. The left building is three stories in height, while that on the right is two stories. Window openings (some filled in) are typically topped by segmented arches, and the main eaves have brick corbelling.

The Briggs Carriage Company began in the 1850s as a maker of jump seat carriages at a facility on Clark and Elm Streets in the center of Amesbury. It acquired a textile mill on the south side of Cedar Street in 1870, and expanded over the next twenty years, eventually occupying four buildings, including these two. The company was one of Amesbury's largest and most successful makers of carriages, out of more than thirty that operated there at one time. In 1889 the company began manufacturing streetcars at 20 Cedar, a business that continued until 1903. The company also began manufacturing bodies for automobiles, at first out of wood and resembling carriages, and eventually out of aluminum. The company went out of business in 1929. The buildings have since seen a variety of commercial and industrial uses.

== Gallery ==
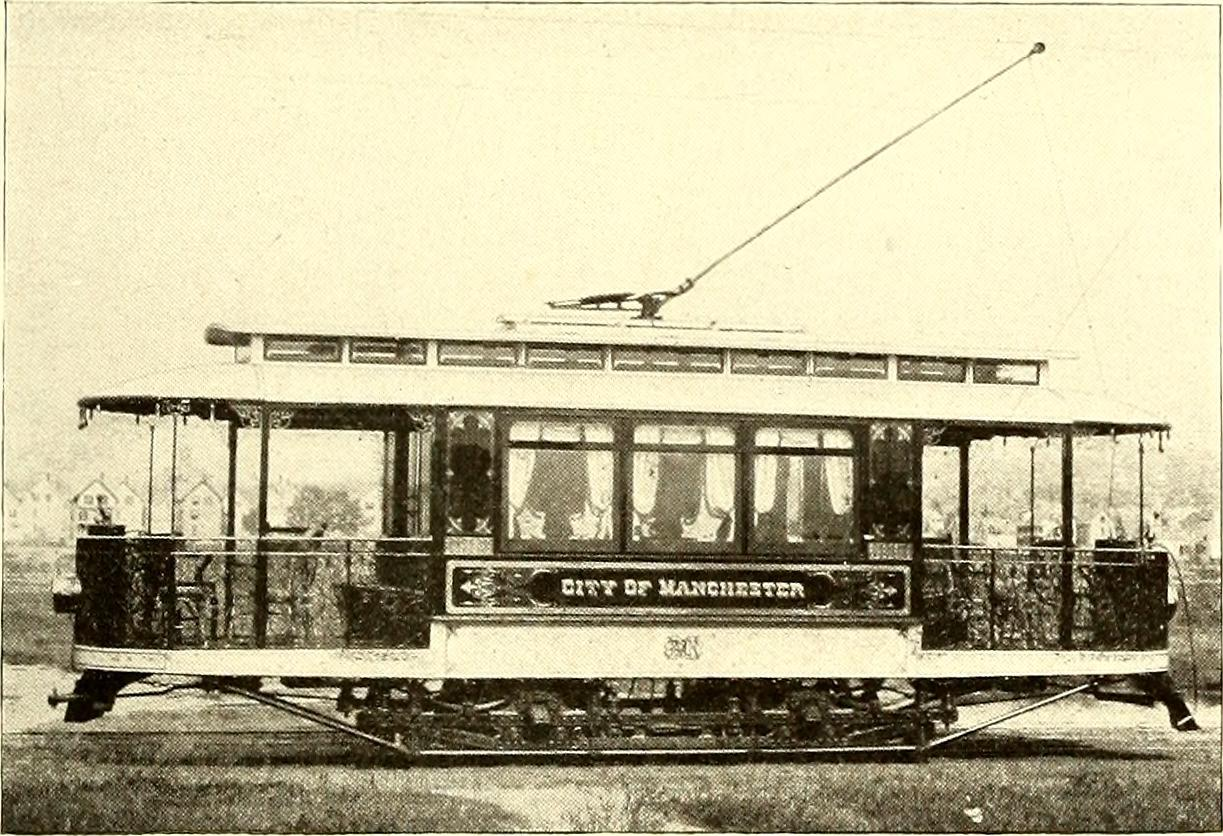
1884 Briggs streetcar for Manchester N. H.

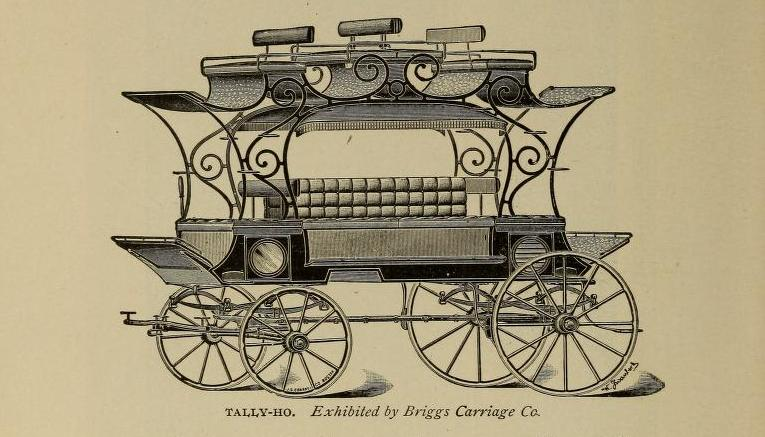
Exhibit at The World's Columbian Exposition, Chicago 1893

== See also ==
- National Register of Historic Places listings in Essex County, Massachusetts
