= Harriet Prescott Spofford =

American poet (1835–1921)

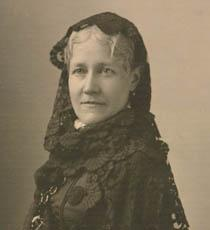
- "Woman of the Century"
- Born: Harriet Elizabeth Prescott; April 3, 1835; Calais, Maine
- Died: August 14, 1921 (aged 86); Deer Island, Amesbury, Massachusetts, U.S.
- Education: Putnam Free School, Pinkerton Academy
- Occupation: Writer
- Spouse: Richard S. Spofford (m. 1865; died 1888)
- Children: 1 (died in infancy)

Signature
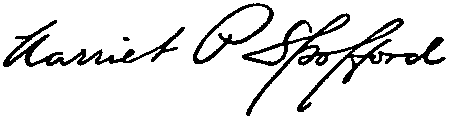

Harriet Elizabeth Prescott Spofford (April 3, 1835 – August 14, 1921) was an American writer of novels, poems and detective stories. One of the United States's most widely-published authors, her career spanned more than six decades and included many literary genres, such as short stories, poems, novels, literary criticism, biographies, and memoirs. She also wrote articles on household decorative art and travel as well as children's literature.

== Early years and education ==
Harriet Elizabeth Prescott was born in Calais, Maine on April 3, 1835, the eldest daughter of Joseph N. Prescott and Sarah Bridges. Among her siblings was Mary Newmarch Prescott, who also became a writer. When Harriet was still very young, the family removed to Newburyport, Massachusetts, which was ever after her home, though she spent many of her winters in Boston and Washington, D.C. Her early environments were characterized by picturesque scenery on the one hand, and sturdy New England teachings on the other, which would later affect the themes and vision of her writing.

Notable people were allied with the Prescott family: William Pepperrell, John Brydges, 1st Baron Chandos, and the historian William H. Prescott, and later William M. Evarts, and the Hoar brothers Ebenezer and George.

Her father, Joseph N. Prescott, was then a lumber merchant in Calais; afterward he studied and practised law. In 1849, he became attracted by the Pacific coast, and, leaving his family in their Maine home, went out among the host of California Gold Rush pioneers to seek his fortune. He was one of the founders of Oregon City, Oregon, and three times elected its mayor. In the midst of arduous work, he was seized with lingering paralysis, that made him an invalid for life.

At fourteen years of age, she moved to her aunt's home, Mrs. Betton, for better educational opportunities, and entered the Putnam Free School in Newburyport, which had the reputation of turning out many accomplished scholars. Here, she also made herself famous among her schoolmates by writing dramas for their use on days of school exhibition; for these plays, she used historic facts and vivid language.

At the age of seventeen, she gained the Putnam school prize for the best essay on Hamlet, which drew the attention of Thomas Wentworth Higginson, pastor of the Unitarian Church, who soon became her friend, and gave her counsel and encouragement. About this time, Mrs. Prescott, with her younger children, moved to Derry, New Hampshire, and after Spofford had graduated at the Putnam School, she finished her education at Pinkerton Academy, from 1853 to 1855.

== Career ==
After graduation at the age of seventeen, a family misfortune occurred. As the eldest of the family, the entire responsibility of financial support fell upon her. The father had been stricken with paralysis, and her mother became a confirmed invalid. Soon after, her first published story appeared, and, being asked for others, she supplied one hundred during the next three years. She besieged the story paper offices of Boston with sketches and novelettes. The competition was not so great then as it later became, but it required almost incessant work — she sometimes wrote for fifteen hours a day — to cover the expenses of the family. The pay was small, and when it was reduced from US$5 to US$2.5, she declined to send more. Her stories of those days were never collected or acknowledged.

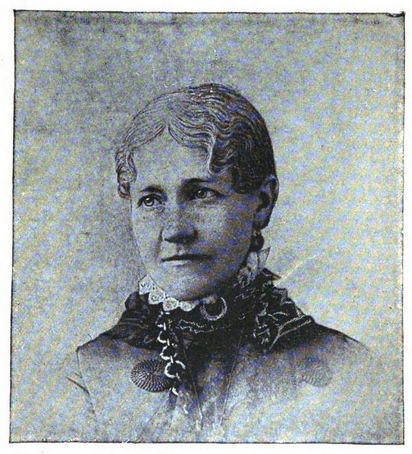
Harriet P. Spofford (1889)

Her wide reputation was acquired almost at a stroke. In 1859, she sent to the Atlantic Monthly a story entitled "In a Cellar." James Russell Lowell was at that time editor of the Atlantic and at first declined to believe that any young lady could have written such a brilliant and characteristic description of Bohemian Parisian life; he insisted that it must be a translation from the French. Upon being assured of its genuineness, he not only printed the story, but also sent its author a check for US$100 with a letter of commendation. The endorsement of the Atlantic opened all other U.S. magazine offices to its writers, allowing her to become a welcome contributor to the chief periodicals of the country, both in prose and poetry.

Her first novel, Sir Rohan's Ghost, published in 1859 in Boston, was a very striking work that showed her talent for skillful plot and effective dramatic denouement, as well as a few flaws, e.g., a crudeness of thought and expression apparent, that she overcame as she gained experience. This book was reviewed at some length in the Crayon, an art journal then published in New York City. She was an important early female writer of mystery fiction, with her stories "In a Cellar" (1859), "Mr. Furbush" (1865), and "In the Maguerriwock" (1868).

Spofford's later works were: The Amber Gods and Other Stories, published in Boston, 1863; Azarian, in 1864; New England Legends, in 1871; The Thief in the Night, in 1872; Art Decoration Applied to Furniture, published in New York in 1881; Marquis of Carabas, Boston, 1872; Hester Stanley at St. Mark's, 1883; The Servant Girl Question, 1884; and Ballads about Authors, 1888. In addition to Spofford's prolific prose, she wrote poems and ballads.

== Style and reception ==
Spofford's fiction had very little in common with what was regarded as representative of the New England mind. Her gothic romances were set apart by luxuriant descriptions, and an unconventional handling of female stereotypes of the day. Her writing was ideal, intense in feeling. In her descriptions and fancies, she reveled in sensuous delights and every variety of splendor. In style, Spofford did not aim at sensationalism, and throughout her writings an air of peace and purity reigned. She exhibited an extraordinary affluence of language, which never appeared to be strained or affected.

When Higginson asked Emily Dickinson whether she had read Spofford's work "Circumstance", Dickinson replied, "I read Miss Prescott's 'Circumstance,' but it followed me in the dark, so I avoided her."

== Personal life ==
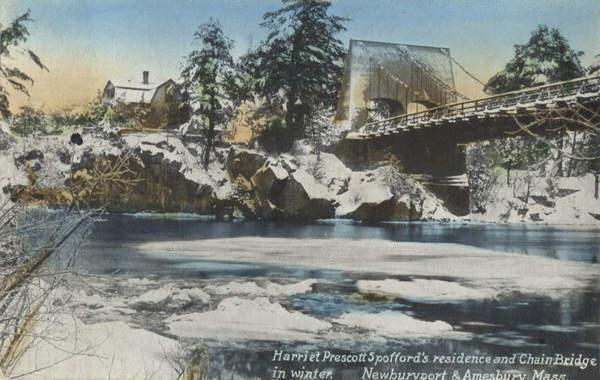
Residence of Harriet Prescott Spofford in c. 1910

In 1865, after many years of engagement, she married Richard S. Spofford (died 1888), a Boston lawyer, and son of Dr. R. S. Spofford, a physician of Essex County; he was also cousin to Ainsworth Rand Spofford, the librarian of the Congressional library in Washington, D. C. In her second year of marriage, a child was born, a son, who died in infancy. She penned the poem 'Lament' about the grief of her loss. Published in the January 1886 Harper's Monthly page 210.

The Spoffords lived on Deer Island overlooking the Merrimack River at Amesbury. Though the entire island was purchased for a permanent home, she spent many of her winters, or a portion of them, in Boston and Washington. Spofford's mother, Mrs. Prescott, died on April 1, 1883, at Deer Island, in her daughter's home. Spofford died at Deer Island on August 14, 1921.

== Selected works ==
- "In a Cellar," Atlantic Monthly, Feb. 1859
- Sir Rohan's Ghost, 1860
- The Amber Gods, and Other Stories, 1863, republished 1989
- Azarian: An Episode, 1864
- "Mr. Furbush", Harper's New Monthly Magazine, Apr 1865
- "In the Maguerriwock," Harper's New Monthly Magazine, Aug 1868
- New England Legends, 1871
- The Thief in the Night, 1872
- Art Decoration Applied to Furniture, 1878
- The Servant Girl Question, 1881
- Marquis of Carabas, 1882
- Poems, 1882
- Hester Stanley at St. Mark's, 1883
- Ballads About Authors, 1887
- A Scarlet Poppy, and Other Stories, 1894
- Stepping Stones To Happiness, 1897
- Old Madame, and Other Tragedies, 1900
- That Betty, 1903
- The Ray of Displacement and other stories, 1903
- Old Washington, 1906
- The Fairy Changeling, 1910
- A Little Book of Friends, 1916
- The Elder's People, 1920

== See also ==
- Harriet Waters Preston, friend
