= Harriet Waters Preston =

American writer and translator (1836–1911)

Harriet Waters Preston (1836–1911) was an American writer and translator. She began writing articles, such as essays and reviews. She is recognized as a scholar for her translations of Provençal literature. Preston has written novels about life in New England. She collaborated with her niece Louise Preston Dodge and Martha LeBaron Goddard.

== Personal life ==
Harriet Waters Preston, the daughter of Lydia W. (Proctor) and Samuel Preston, was born in 1836 in Danvers, Massachusetts. Her father was an inventor and bank trustee. Preston was educated at home. She lived in Great Britain and France for many years. She never married. Her obituary states she was "an intimate friend" of Harriet Prescott Spofford.

After she returned to the United States to live, in the later years of her life, she owned a house in Keene, New Hampshire. She spent the 1910–1911 winter at the home of her friends, Mr. and Mrs. James Muirhead in Cambridge, Massachusetts. James was the editor of Baedekers United States. Preston died at the Muirhead's home on May 14, 1911. (Note: She had intended to return to her home in Keene, but had the care of nurses at the Muirhead's home, where she died. Tapley states that Preston died at Keene, New Hampshire in 1911.) She was buried in the family lot at the Walnut Grove Cemetery in Danvers, Massachusetts.

== Career ==
At a young age, she began to write for magazines. Beginning in 1865, Preston translated French literature, such as Mirèio by Frédéric Mistral and Georgics (1881) by Virgil. Between 1874 and 1883, she had written for Atlantic Monthly, including Aspendale, Songs of the Troubadours, and At Canterbury. She wrote for other magazines and published Private Life of the Romans (1893) and Love in the Nineteenth Century.

She collaborated with her niece Louise Preston Dodge, the daughter of Mary (Preston) and Francis Dodge. They wrote stories for the Atlantic Monthly from 1887 to 1897, the book Private Life of the Romans (1893) The Guardians (1888), and A Year in Eden (1886). With Martha LeBaron Goddard, she wrote Sea and Shore: A Collection of Poems (1874).

Joseph Pennell and Elizabeth Robins Pennell dedicated their 1891 book of sketches Play in Provence "To Harriet Waters Preston who was the first to turn our attention, as well as that of all other English-speaking people, to the country of Mireio, we offer our impressions of Provence". The reference is to Mirèio, an epic poem by Frédéric Mistral.
