= Merrimac Square =

Coordinates: 42°50′1.3″N 71°0′8.9″W

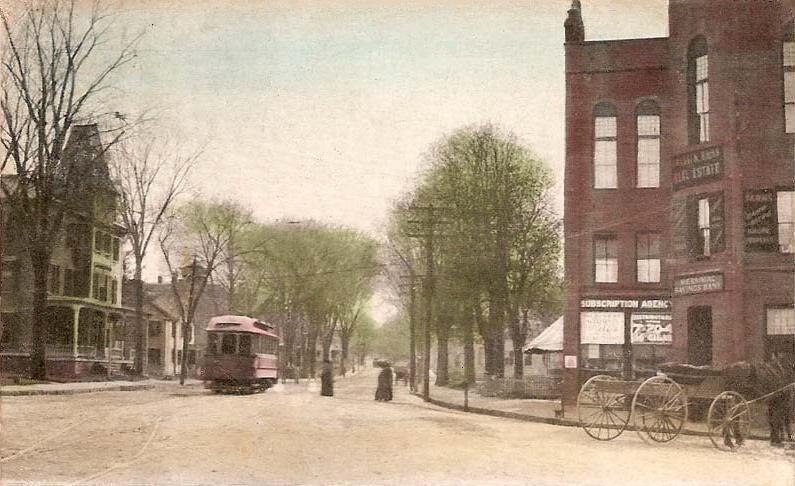
Merrimac Square in 1911

Merrimac Square is located in the center of the town of Merrimac, Massachusetts. It is the commercial, cultural and historical center of the town.

The main events of the town, including the Merrimac Santa Parade and Merrimac Old Home Days, are held in the square.

The Square joins East and West Main Streets, as well as Church Street and School Street. There was previously only a concrete island in the center of the roadway, with a flagpole at the center. The two banks, one of them in a building dating back to the 1800s, are located at the entrance to West Main Street. The fire station is located near the entrance to East Main Street.

In mid-2015, the town square was renovated, changing the open roadway of the square into a small rotary, as well as implementing a new water main and sidewalks compliant with the ADA.
