= Amesbury, Massachusetts =

- City
- City of Amesbury
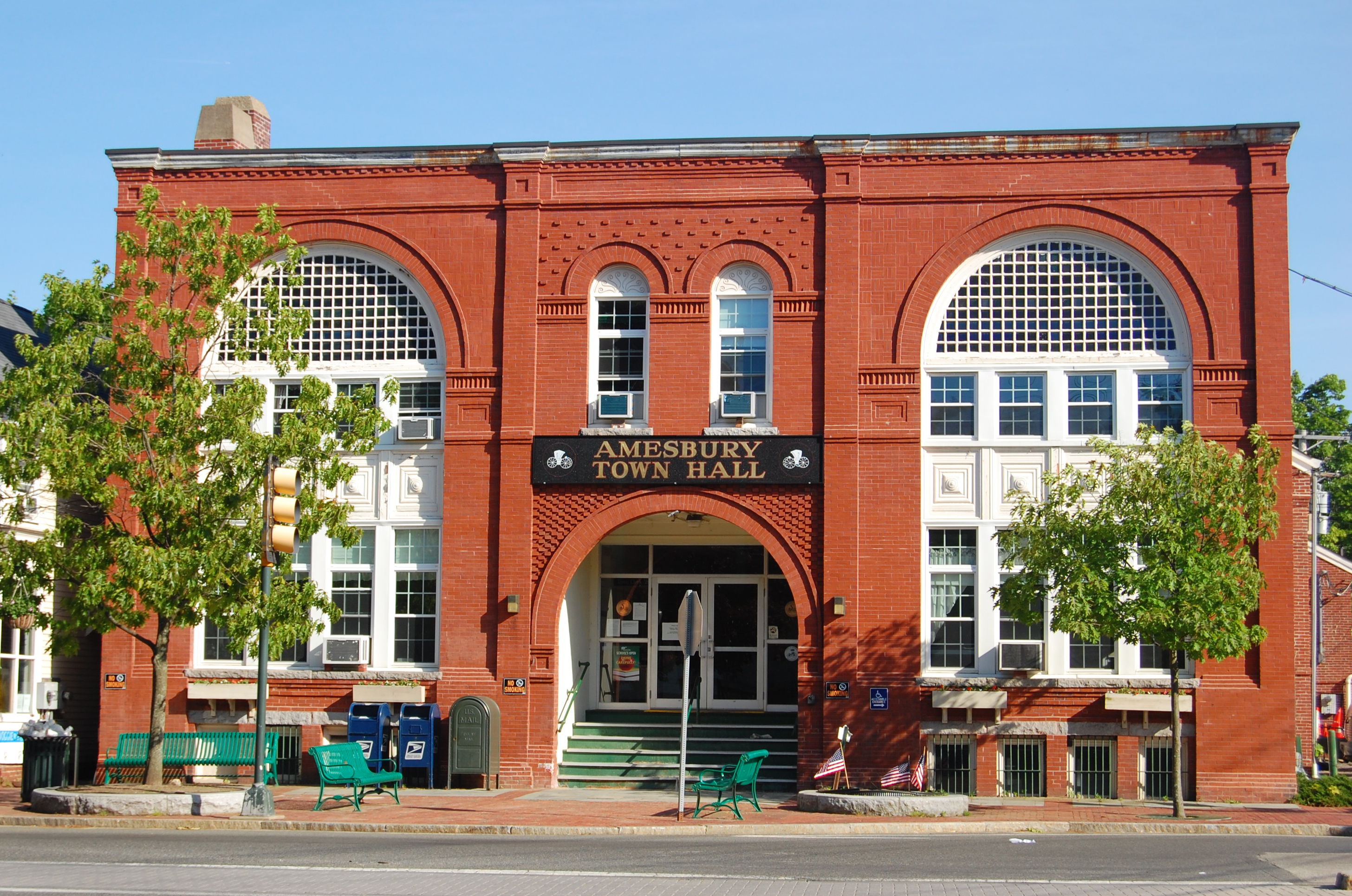
- Amesbury City Hall

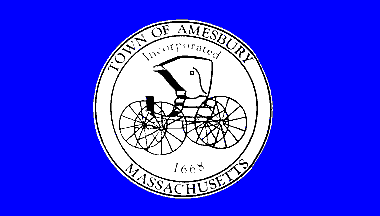
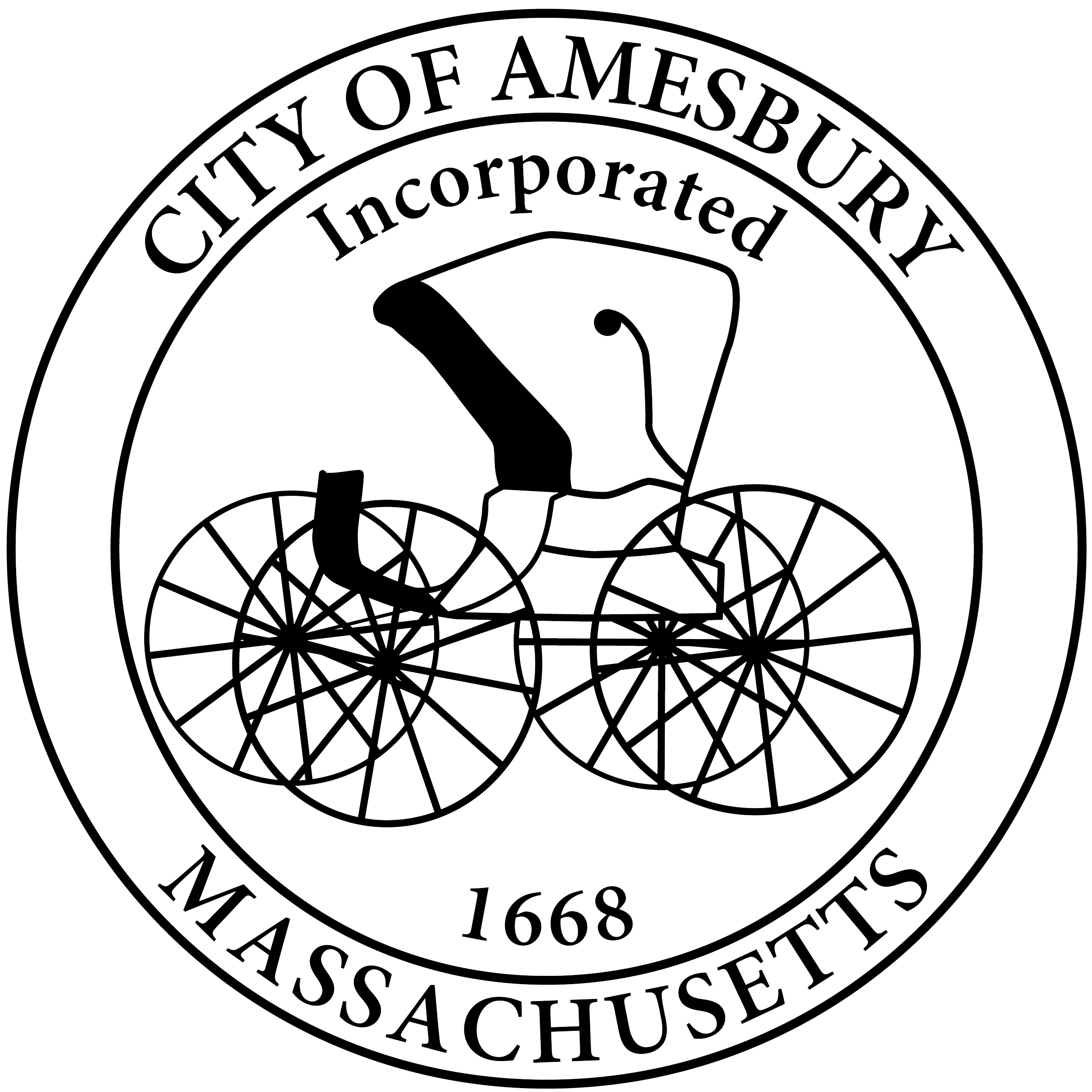
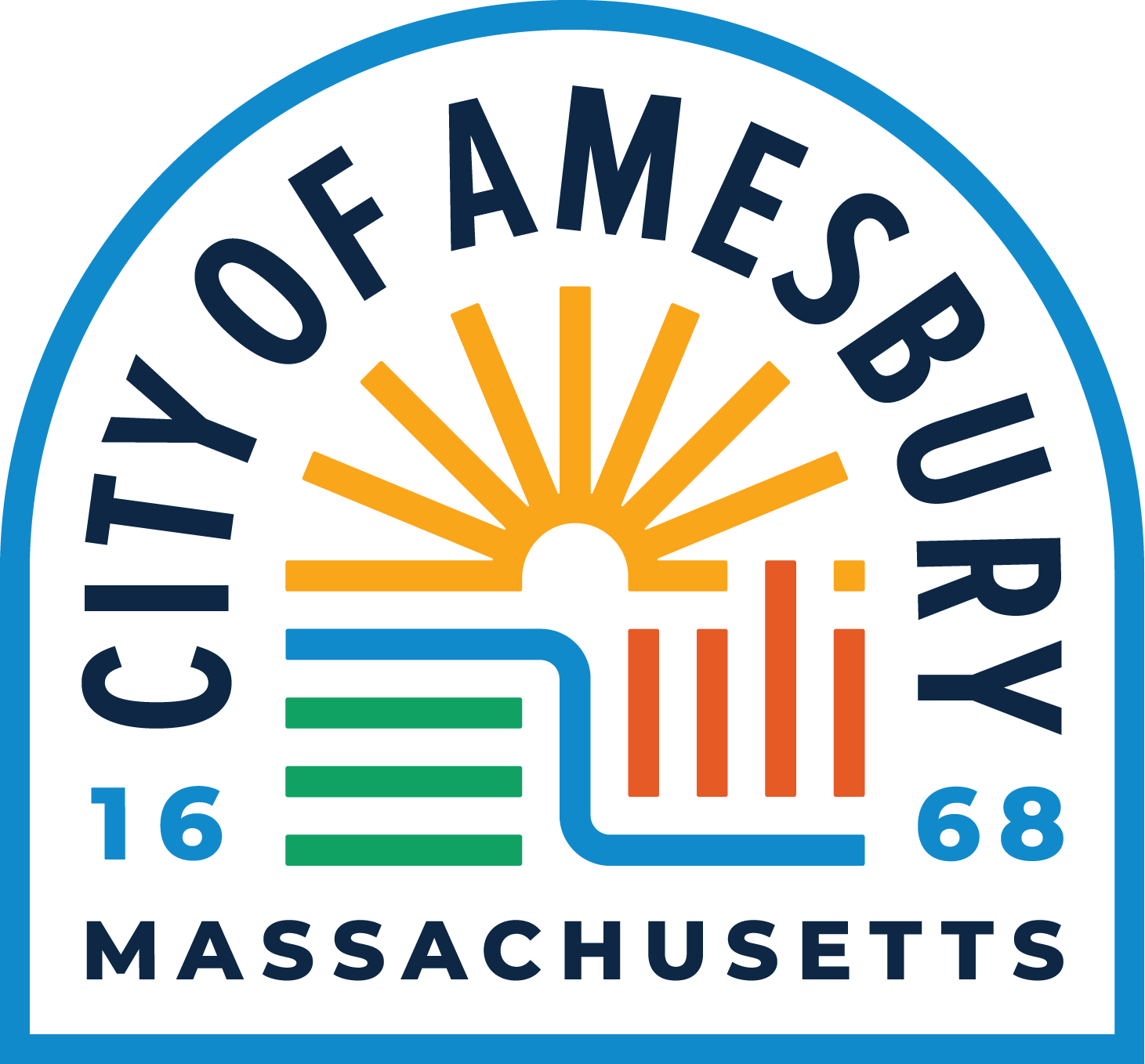
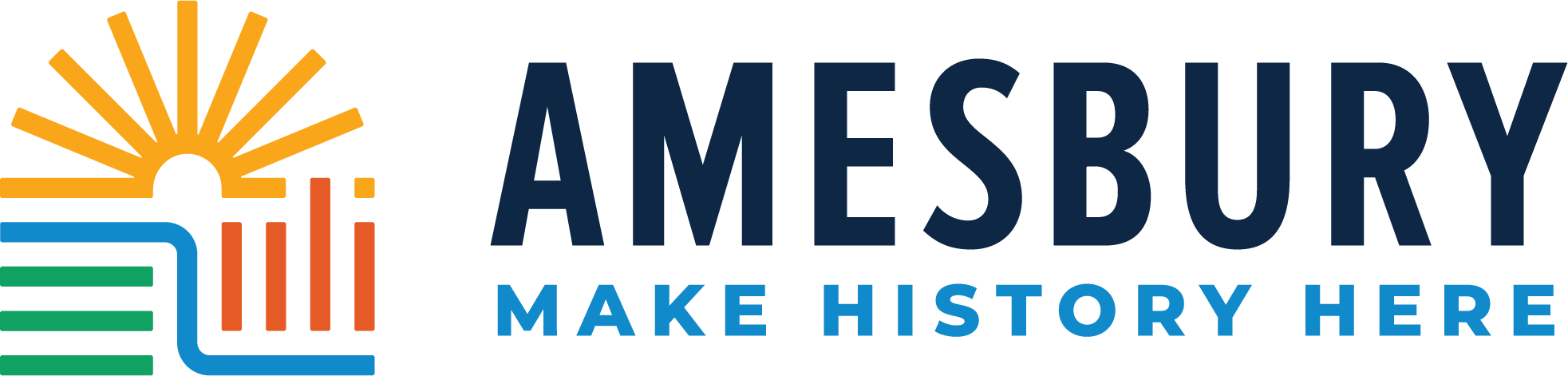
- Flag Seal Coat of arms Wordmark
- Nickname: Carriagetown
- Motto: "Make history here!"
- Location in Essex County and Massachusetts

- Location in the United States
- Coordinates: 42°51′30″N 70°55′50″W
- Country: United States
- State: Massachusetts
- County: Essex
- Settled: 1642
- Incorporated (town): 1668
- Incorporated (city): 1996

Government
  - Type: Mayor-council city
  - Mayor: Kassandra Gove

Area
  - Total: 13.73 sq mi (35.57 km^{2})
  - Land: 12.29 sq mi (31.84 km^{2})
  - Water: 1.44 sq mi (3.73 km^{2})
- Elevation: 49 ft (15 m)

Population (2020)
  - Total: 17,366
  - Density: 1,412.8/sq mi (545.48/km^{2})
- Time zone: UTC−5 (Eastern)
  - Summer (DST): UTC−4 (Eastern)
- ZIP code: 01913
- Area code: 351 / 978
- FIPS code: 25-01260, 25-01185
- GNIS feature ID: 0618292
- Website: amesburyma.gov

Amesbury is a city in Essex County, Massachusetts, United States, located on the left bank of the Merrimack River near its mouth, upstream from Salisbury and across the river from Newburyport and West Newbury. The population was 17,366 at the 2020 United States census. A former farming and mill town, Amesbury is today largely residential. It is one of the two northernmost towns in Massachusetts (the other being neighboring Salisbury).

== History ==
=== Pre-Colonial Period ===
At the time of European contact and colonization, the area north of the Merrimack River was inhabited by the Pentucket Tribe of the Pennacook confederation. Several places in Amesbury retain or have been returned to indigenous names including the Powwow River and Hill, and Lake Attitash.

=== Colonial Period ===
==== Plantation at Merrimac ====
In 1637, the first English settler in the Salisbury-Amesbury region, John Bayly, crossed the Merrimack River from the new settlement at Newbury, built a log cabin, and began to clear the land for cultivation. He intended to send for his wife and children in England, but they never joined him. He and his hired man, William Schooler, were arrested for a murder Schooler had committed. Schooler was hanged for the murder but Bayly was acquitted. Given the fishing rights on the river by the subsequent settlement, provided he would sell only to it, he abandoned agriculture for fishing.

On September 6, 1638, the General Court of Massachusetts created a plantation on behalf of several petitioners from Newbury, on the left bank of the Merrimack, as far north as Hampton, to be called Merrimac. They were given permission to associate together as a township. The area remained in possession of the tribes along the Merrimack, who hunted and fished there.

The settlers of the plantation, who entered Massachusetts Bay Colony, were rebels in a cause that was settled by the English Civil War (1642–1651). Although nominally subjects of the crown, they did not obey it. The settlers maintained close ties with the Parliamentary cause in Britain. The supreme government of the colony was the General Court, which functioned autonomously, passing its own laws, establishing courts, incorporating townships and providing for the overall defense of the colony. They established a Puritan church rather than the Church of England.

In the early spring of 1639, approximately 60 planters took up residence on land cleared by the natives. In May, an elected planning committee laid out the green, the initial streets, the burial ground, and the first division into lots, apportioning the size of a lot to the wealth of the settler. In November, the General Court appointed a government of six, which required that every lot owner take up residence on his lot. They began to assign lots west of the Pow-wow river. The town was originally named Colchester, but was renamed Salisbury in October 1640, potentially at the suggestion of Christopher Batt, from Salisbury, England. Batt trained the militia in the town. The incorporation of the town granted it legal recognition by the colony to a township of that name, with its own government, empowered by citizens populating a territory of legally defined boundaries. The original Salisbury was many times larger than the present. From it several townships were later separated.

On January 12, 1641, a town meeting ordered the first roads north and west of the Pow-wow River to be built. On April 21, another meeting granted William Osgood 50 acres of "upland" and 10 of "meadow" along the Pow-wow River, provided he build a sawmill for the town to use. It utilized a water wheel driven by the Pow-wow River. The mill produced lumber for local use and pipe-staves for export. A gristmill was added to the Pow-wow river location in 1642. The Powwow River provided water power for a subsequent mill complex. In 1642, the town wanted families to take up residence west of the Pow-wow and form a "New Town." No volunteers responded.

In 1643, the General Court divided Massachusetts Bay Colony into four counties: Essex, Norfolk, Middlesex and Suffolk. Norfolk contained Salisbury, Hampton, Haverhill, Exeter, Dover, and Strawberry Bank (Portsmouth). This division was a legal convenience based on the distribution of courts. Since the first establishment of four courts on March 3, 1635, the General Court had found it necessary to multiply and distribute courts, so that the magistrates would not spend time in travel that they needed for settling case loads. The main requirement for membership in a shire was incorporation.

==== Separation from Salisbury ====
Private occupation of the west bank of the Pow-wow River went on as East Salisbury citizens sold their property and moved to New Town. However, New Town remained a paper construct without enforcement. On January 14, 1654, articles of agreement adopted at town meeting divided Salisbury into Old Town and New Town, each to conduct its own affairs. The border was the Pow-wow. The agreement went into effect on January 19, 1655. In New Town, a new government was voted in, which claimed authority over "all matters of publicke concernment." They still paid taxes to Old Town and expected services from it. The board of Old Town contained some members from New Town for fair representation. This agreement also was known as a "settlement".

On May 26, 1658, New Town petitioned the General Court for independent town status, but the Old Town denied the petition. The Old Town required all inhabitants, including those in the New Town, to attend church in Old Town and fined settlers for each missed meeting The church and preacher were maintained from taxes. Minister Joseph Peasley of New Town and his congregation attempting to defy the General Court were summoned into District Court at Ipswich "to answer for their disobedience", were fined there and Peasly was enjoined from preaching. Another petition for separation was denied in 1660.

The burden of attending church several miles away became so great that New Town built a new meeting house and requested the General Court to find a preacher. The court yielded to the petition of 1666, granting the "liberty of a township" to New Town. The town was unofficially incorporated, meaning a government was constituted and officers elected, on June 15. It was named New Salisbury, but in 1667 the name was changed to Amesbury on the analogy of Amesbury, England, which was next to Salisbury, England. Amesbury was officially granted incorporation under that name on April 29, 1668.

After King Phillips War (1675–1678), an effort by the natives to rid themselves of the colonists, the Royal Province of New Hampshire was created and took away several towns in northern Norfolk shire. Massachusetts was reduced in size from most of New England to roughly its current borders. The Court dissolved Norfolk Shire, transferring Salisbury and Amesbury to Essex County.

=== Industrial Era ===
Beginning as a modest farming community, Amesbury developed a maritime and industrial economy. Shipbuilding, shipping and fishing were also important. The ferry across the Merrimack River to Newburyport was a business until the construction of bridges to cross the river. Newton, New Hampshire, was set off from Amesbury in 1741, when the border between the two colonies was adjusted.

In the 19th century, textile mills were built at the falls, as was a nail-making factory. Beginning around 1800, Amesbury began building carriages, a trade which evolved into the manufacture of automobile bodies. Prominent manufacturers included Walker Body Company, Briggs Carriage Company, and Biddle and Smart. The industry ended with the Great Depression. The Merrimac Hat Company was founded in 1856 and became one of the top hat producers in the nation. Amesbury also produced Hoyt's Buffalo Brand Peanut Butter Kisses.

In 1876, Merrimac was created out of West Amesbury. In 1886, West Salisbury was annexed to Amesbury, unifying the mill areas on both banks of the Pow-wow River.

Newspapers in the 19th century included the Amesbury Daily News, Merrimac Journal, Morning Courier, Evening Courier, New England Chronicle, Transcript, and the Villager. Newspapers in the 20th century included the Amesbury Advocate, Amesbury News, Amesbury Times, and Leader.

=== Twentieth century and beyond ===
In 1996, the town changed its status to a city, and adopted the mayor and municipal council form of government, although it retained the title "Town of Amesbury", as voters "thought Amesbury was too small and quaint to be a city". Voters approved a charter amendment in November 2011 changing the city's official name to the "City of Amesbury" and removing references to the old "Town of Amesbury" name. The name change took effect in March 2012. The city's seal still bears the name "Town of Amesbury", although the City put forth a bill in 2013 to correct the seal with the new name.

The community has several buildings that feature early architecture, particularly in the Federal and Victorian styles. The "Doughboy", a memorial sculpture by Leonard Craske, stands on the front lawn of the Amesbury Middle School. It was dedicated November 11, 1929. Craske is best known as sculptor for the "Fishermens' Memorial" in Gloucester. There is also a monument erected to Josiah Bartlett, the first signer of the Declaration of Independence, who was born in Amesbury.

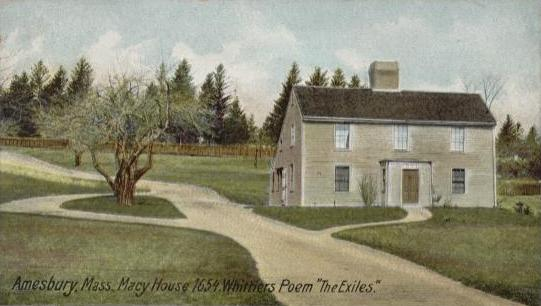
Thomas Macy House c. 1905

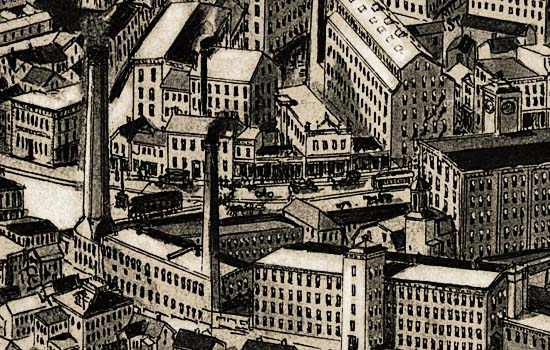
Mills in 1914

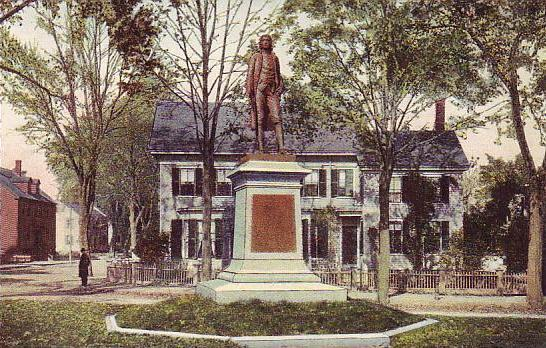
Statue of Josiah Bartlett, signer of the Declaration of Independence, c. 1910

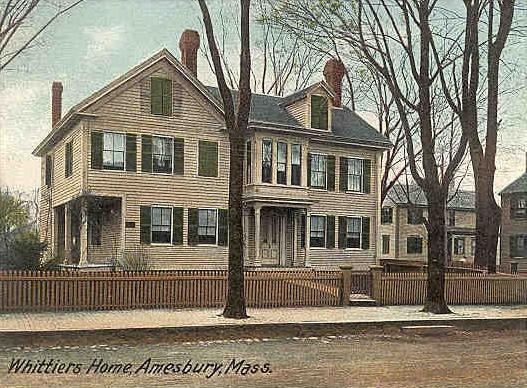
Whittier's home in 1909

== Geography ==
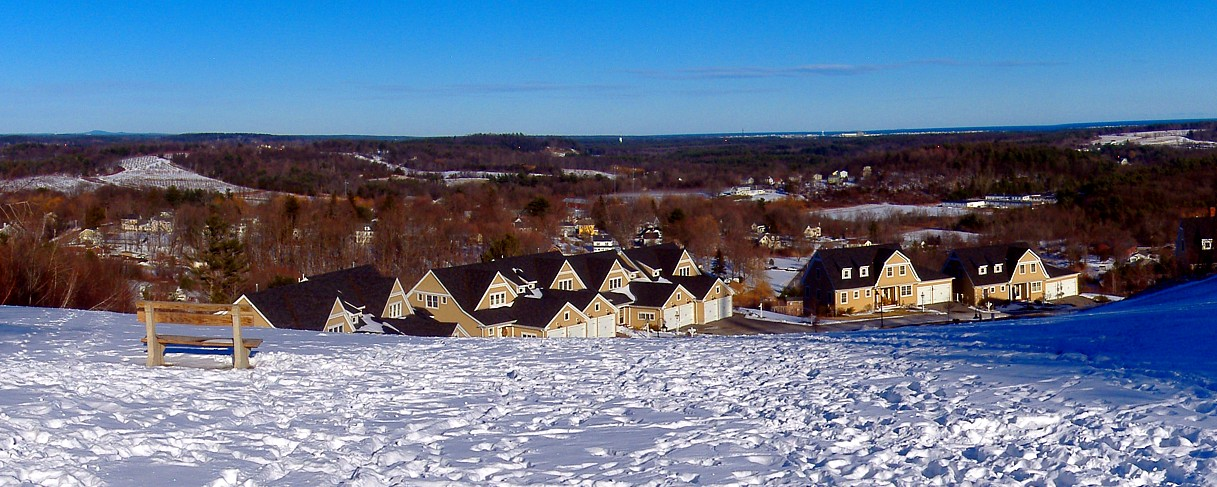
View northeast from Powwow Hill

Amesbury is located at 42°51′29″N 70°55′50″W. According to the United States Census Bureau, the city has a total area of 13.7 square miles (35.5 km^{2}), of which 12.3 square miles (31.8 km^{2}) is land and 1.5 square miles (3.8 km^{2}), or 10.65%, is water. Amesbury is drained by the Powwow River. Powwow Hill, elevation 331 feet (101 m), is the highest point in town. Once the site of Indian gatherings, or "powwows", it has views to Maine and Cape Ann. Amesbury is the second northernmost town in Massachusetts, its northernmost point coming just south of the northernmost point of the state, in Salisbury. Amesbury lies along the northern banks of the Merrimack River and is bordered by Salisbury to the east, Newburyport to the southeast, West Newbury to the southwest, Merrimac to the west, and South Hampton, New Hampshire, to the north.

The Powwow River bisects the town, joined by the Back River near the town center. The river flows through Lake Gardner and Tuxbury Pond, which are two of several inland bodies of water in town, including Lake Attitash (which is partially in Merrimac), Meadowbrook Pond, and Pattens Pond. Several brooks also flow through the town. Amesbury has a town forest, which is connected to Woodsom Farm, as well as Powwow Conservation Area, Victoria Batchelder Park and Amesbury Golf & Country Club.

== Transportation ==
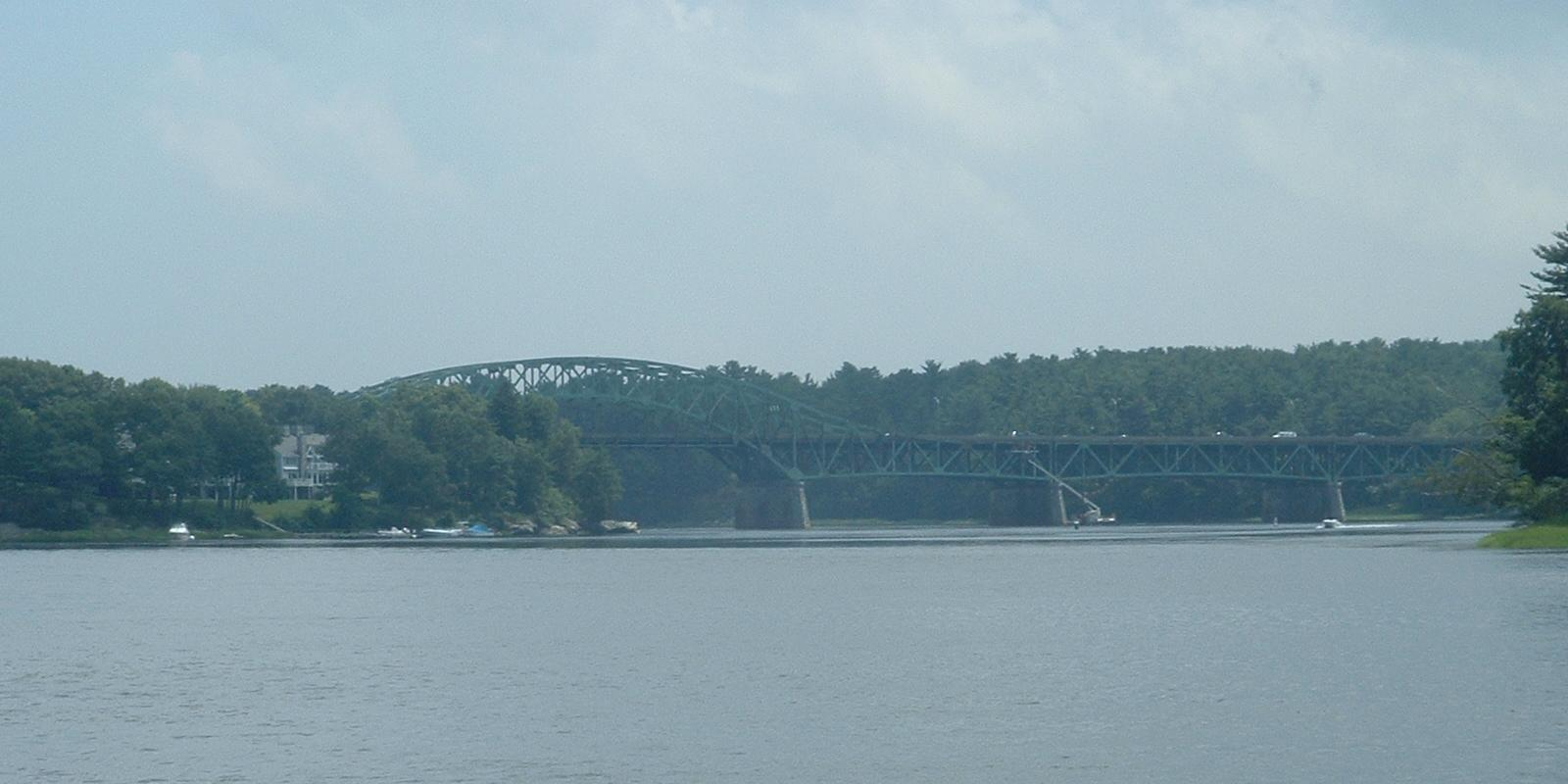
Whittier Memorial Bridge, which carries Route 95, a major highway, between Newburyport and Amesbury.

Amesbury is served by two interstate highways. Interstate 495 runs from west to east through town, ending at Interstate 95 just over the Salisbury town line. It has two exits in town, Exit 54 at Massachusetts Route 150 (which lies entirely within Amesbury, and leads to New Hampshire Route 150) and Exit 55 at Massachusetts Route 110, which also provides the town's only direct access to Interstate 95 at Exit 58. I-95 crosses the southeast corner of town, entering along the John Greenleaf Whittier Memorial Bridge, a steel through-truss bridge crossing the Merrimack River.

The Whittier Memorial Bridge lies just west of the town's only other bridges across the Merrimack, the Derek S. Hines Memorial Bridge, which connects Amesbury to Deer Island (which is still part of Amesbury), and the Chain Bridge, the only suspension bridge in Massachusetts, which spans from Deer Island to Newburyport. The current version was built in 1909, but was predated by the 1810 suspension bridge, one of the oldest suspension bridges in the country. The Chain Bridge and its counterparts over the years have been the main entryways into town across the Merrimack, and until the building of the Newburyport Turnpike Bridge, it was the easternmost bridge on the Merrimack River.

MVRTA provides bus service in Amesbury. Route 51 connects to the Haverhill train station. Route 54 connects to Newburyport train station.

Historical population
Year	Pop.	±%
1790	1,801	—
1800	1,757	−2.4%
1810	1,890	+7.6%
1820	1,956	+3.5%
1830	2,445	+25.0%
1840	2,471	+1.1%
1850	3,143	+27.2%
1860	3,877	+23.4%
1870	5,581	+44.0%
1880	3,355	−39.9%
1890	9,798	+192.0%
1900	9,473	−3.3%
1910	9,894	+4.4%
1920	10,036	+1.4%
1930	11,899	+18.6%
1940	10,862	−8.7%
1950	10,851	−0.1%
1960	10,787	−0.6%
1970	11,388	+5.6%
1980	13,971	+22.7%
1990	14,997	+7.3%
2000	16,450	+9.7%
2010	16,283	−1.0%
2020	17,366	+6.7%
2024*	17,617	+1.4%
* population estimate. Source: United States census records and Population Estimates Program data. Source: U.S. Decennial Census

== Government ==
Amesbury is part of the Massachusetts Senate's 1st Essex district.

Amesbury presidential election results
Year	Democratic	Republican	Third parties	Total Votes	Margin
2024	63.02% 6,567	33.59% 3,500	1.94% 202	10,421	29.43%
2020	65.28% 6,786	32.00% 3,326	2.72% 283	10,395	33.29%
2016	56.88% 5,174	35.52% 3,231	7.60% 691	9,096	21.36%
2012	57.58% 4,863	40.58% 3,427	1.85% 156	8,446	17.00%
2008	59.85% 5,111	37.73% 3,222	2.42% 207	8,540	22.12%
2004	57.99% 4,589	40.79% 3,228	1.21% 96	7,913	17.20%
2000	55.82% 3,866	36.15% 2,504	8.03% 556	6,926	19.67%
1996	58.75% 3,774	27.62% 1,774	13.64% 876	6,424	31.13%
1992	41.18% 2,857	28.51% 1,978	30.31% 2,103	6,938	10.87%
1988	54.69% 3,352	43.50% 2,666	1.81% 111	6,129	11.19%
1984	41.41% 2,395	58.04% 3,357	0.55% 32	5,784	16.63%
1980	37.70% 2,076	43.24% 2,381	19.05% 1,049	5,506	5.54%
1976	56.05% 3,001	40.89% 2,189	3.06% 164	5,354	15.17%
1972	47.24% 2,432	52.25% 2,690	0.51% 26	5,148	5.01%
1968	57.13% 2,820	38.78% 1,914	4.09% 202	4,936	18.35%
1964	71.39% 3,520	28.21% 1,391	0.41% 20	4,931	43.18%
1960	56.68% 3,198	43.12% 2,433	0.19% 11	5,642	13.56%
1956	36.35% 1,978	63.47% 3,454	0.18% 10	5,442	27.12%
1952	42.50% 2,430	57.28% 3,275	0.23% 13	5,718	14.78%
1948	54.57% 2,789	44.06% 2,252	1.37% 70	5,111	10.51%
1944	54.09% 2,689	45.64% 2,269	0.26% 13	4,971	8.45%
1940	55.01% 2,934	44.24% 2,360	0.75% 40	5,334	10.76%

== Demographics ==
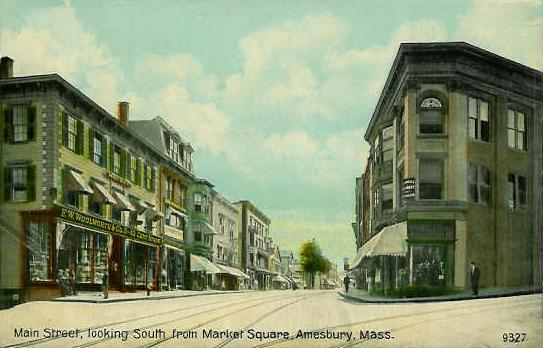
Main Street from Market Square in 1911

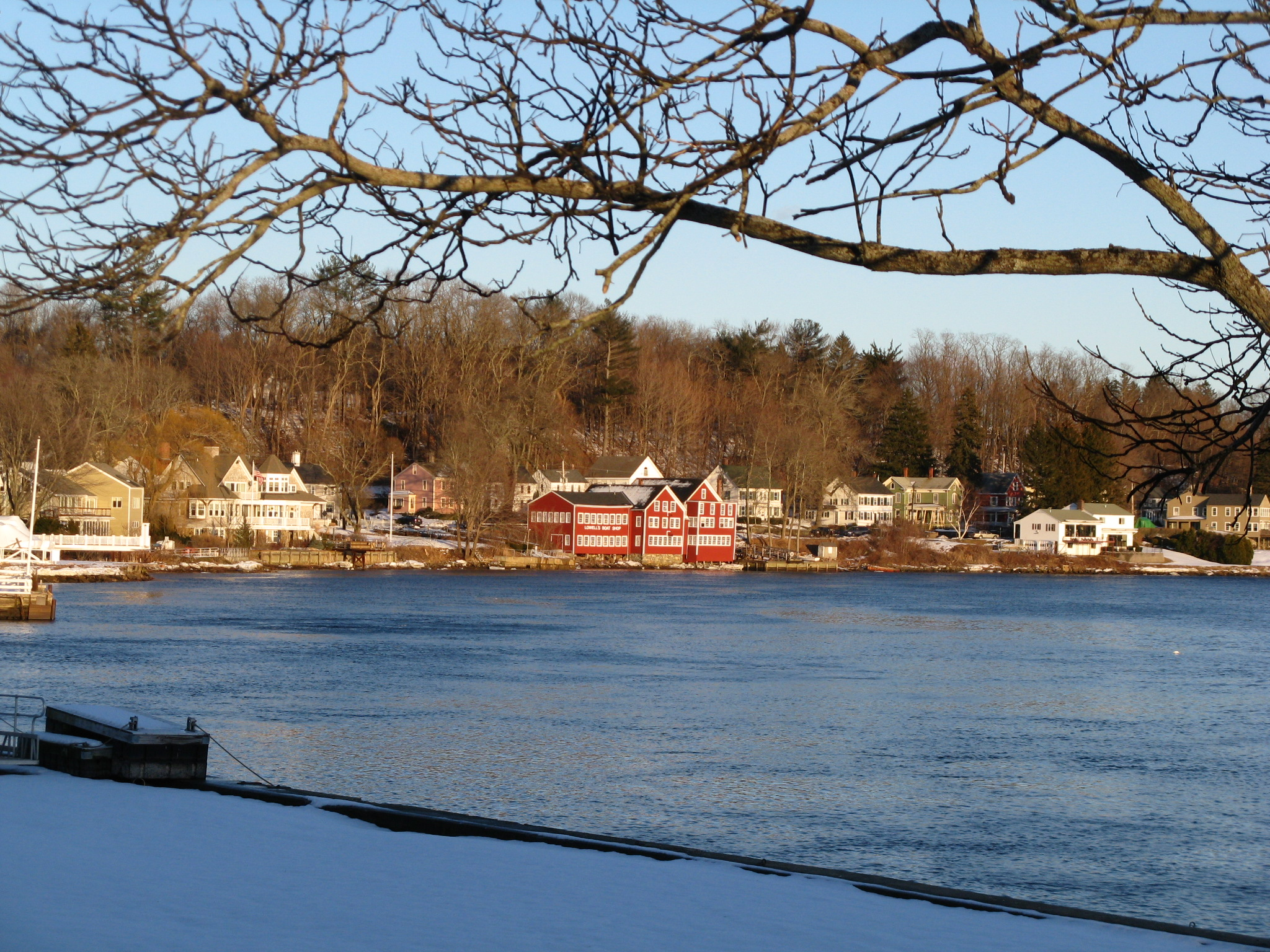
Lowell's Boat Shop

As of the census of 2000, there were 16,450 people, 6,380 households, and 4,229 families residing in the city. The population density was 1,326.3 inhabitants per square mile (512.1/km^{2}). There were 6,623 housing units at an average density of 206.2 persons/km^{2} (534.0 persons/sq mi). The racial makeup of the city was 97.2% White, 0.6% African American, 0.22% Native American, 0.9% of the population were Hispanic or Latino of any race.

There were 6,380 households, out of which 34.5% had children under the age of 18 living with them, 51.2% were married couples living together, 11.3% have a woman whose husband does not live with her, and 33.7% were non-families. 26.8% of all households were made up of individuals, and 8.9% had someone living alone who was 65 years of age or older. The average household size was 2.52 and the average family size was 3.09.

In the city, the population was spread out, with 26.1% under the age of 18, 6.1% from 18 to 24, 33.8% from 25 to 44, 22.0% from 45 to 64, and 12.0% who were 65 years of age or older. The median age was 37 years. For every 100 females, there were 93.1 males. For every 100 females age 18 and over, there were 89.7 males.

The median income for a household in the city was $34,906, and the median income for a family was $62,875. Males had a median income of $25,489 versus $31,968 for females. The per capita income for the city was $23,103. 5.9% of the population and 3.9% of families were below the poverty line.

== Education ==
The major educational institutions are:

- Amesbury Public Schools
  - SGT. Jordan Shay Memorial Lower Elementary School (K-2)
  - Charles C. Cashman Elementary School (3–5)
  - Amesbury Middle School (6–8)
  - Amesbury High School (9–12)
  - Amesbury Innovation High School (School of Choice)

In 2023, the Amesbury Elementary School closed following the construction of the Shay Memorial School, built on the same property as the Cashman Elementary School. Prior to this, both Amesbury Elementary School and Cashman Elementary School housed K-4 students, with students attending whichever school they lived closer to. Beginning in the 2024-2025 school year, all K-5 students were housed on the same property and divided by age between the Shay Memorial Lower Elementary School and the preexisting Cashman Elementary School.

Amesbury's high school football rival is Newburyport; the two teams play against each other every Thanksgiving Day. The Amesbury mascot is "Red Hawks," formerly the "Indians."

== Public library ==
As of 2012, the Amesbury Public Library pays for access to information resources produced by Brainfuse, Cengage Learning, EBSCO Industries, LearningExpress, Library Ideas, Mango Languages, NewsBank, Online Computer Library Center (OCLC), ProQuest, TumbleBook Library, World Book of Berkshire Hathaway, and World Trade Press.

The Public Library houses an extensive Local History and genealogy collection which is open and available for research.

== Points of interest ==
- Alliance Park, site of the construction of the USS Alliance in 1777
- Amesbury Carriage Museum
- Amesbury Friends Meeting House (1850)
- Amesbury Hat Museum, which displays hats of the old Merrimack Hat Factory
- Amesbury Public Library
- Chain Bridge
- Bartlett Museum, Inc. (1870)
- Fortune Bar
- John Greenleaf Whittier House
- Lowell's Boat Shop (1793)
- Macy-Colby House (c. 1654)
- Mary Baker Eddy Historic House
- Old Powder House (1810)
- Rocky Hill Meeting House (c. 1785)
- Salisbury Point Railroad Historical Society
- Acorn Mountain Park
- Maples Crossing (2021)

== Notable people ==
- Jimmy Bannon (1871–1948), outfielder in Major League Baseball
- Josiah Bartlett (1729–1795), signer of the Declaration of Independence, fourth Governor of New Hampshire
- Daniel Blaisdell (1762–1833), congressman from New Hampshire
- Nathaniel Currier (1813–1888), American lithographer, Currier and Ives
- Jeffrey Donovan (born 1968), actor; star of television show Burn Notice
- Mary Baker Eddy (1821–1910), founder of Christian Science
- Robert Frost (1874–1963), poet
- Susannah (North) Martin, victim of Salem witch trials in 1692
- William A. Paine (1844–1929), businessman, co-founded the brokerage firm Paine Webber
- Harriet Prescott Spofford (1835–1921), author
- Paine Wingate (1739–1838), preacher, served in the Continental Congress; US senator and congressman
- Al Capp, cartoonist, author of long running satirical strip Li'l Abner lived in Amesbury for most of his life and is buried in the town.
- John Greenleaf Whittier (1807–1892), poet

== International relations ==
=== Twin towns – Sister cities ===
Amesbury is twinned with:

- Amesbury, England (Since 2025)
- Esabalu, Kenya (since 1987)

== See also ==
- List of mill towns in Massachusetts

== Publications ==
=== Books and articles ===
- Arrington, Benjamin F., ed. (1922). Municipal History of Essex County in Massachusetts. Vol. I (Tercentenary ed.). New York: Lewis Historical Publishing Company.
- Merrill, Joseph (1880). History of Amesbury Including the First Seventeen Years of Salisbury to the Separation in 1654 and Merrimac from its Incorporation in 1876. Haverhill: Press of Franklin P. Stiles. "history of amesbury."
- Amesbury Vital Records to 1849. Published 1913. Transcribed and put online by John Slaughter and Jodi Salerno.
- Merrill, Joseph, History of Amesbury, from the History of Essex County Volume 2 Chapter 125, pages 1495–1535, compiled by D. Hamilton Hurd, published by J.W. Lewis 1888.

=== Maps ===
- Sargeant, Christopher. 1794 Map of Amesbury.
- Clough, Aaron. 1795 Map of Salisbury.
- Nichols, W., J S Morse. 1830 Map of Amesbury.
- Anderson, Philander. 1830 Map of Salisbury.
- Beers, D.G. 1872 Atlas of Essex County, Massachusetts Amesbury. Plate 9. Amesbury and Salisbury Mills. Now Amesbury Center. Plate 12. Salisbury. Plate 15. West Amesbury now Merrimac. And East Salisbury. Plate 17. Salisbury Point. Plate 19. (Now The Point in Amesbury).
- Bigelow, E.H. Amesbury and Salisbury Mills. Bird's-eye view at the Boston Public Library website.
- Norris, George E. Amesbury. Panoramic View. Published 1890. Burleigh Lith. Est. At the Library of Congress website.
- Hughes & Bailey. Amesbury. Panoramic View. Published 1914.
- Walker, George H. 1884 Atlas of Essex County Massachusetts 1884 Map of Amesbury. Plate 169. Amesbury, Salisbury Point. Plate 74. Merrimac Center (was West Amesbury). Plate 151. Amesbury Village Mills. Plate 170-171. 1884 Map of Merrimac. Plate 172. 1884 Map of Salisbury. Plate 175. Salisbury Village Mills on the Powwow River. Plate. 176-177. East Salisbury. Plate 178. Danvers Catholic Church, Folger's Carriage Factory Amesbury. Plate 166.
