= Essex County, Massachusetts =

County in Massachusetts, United States

- County
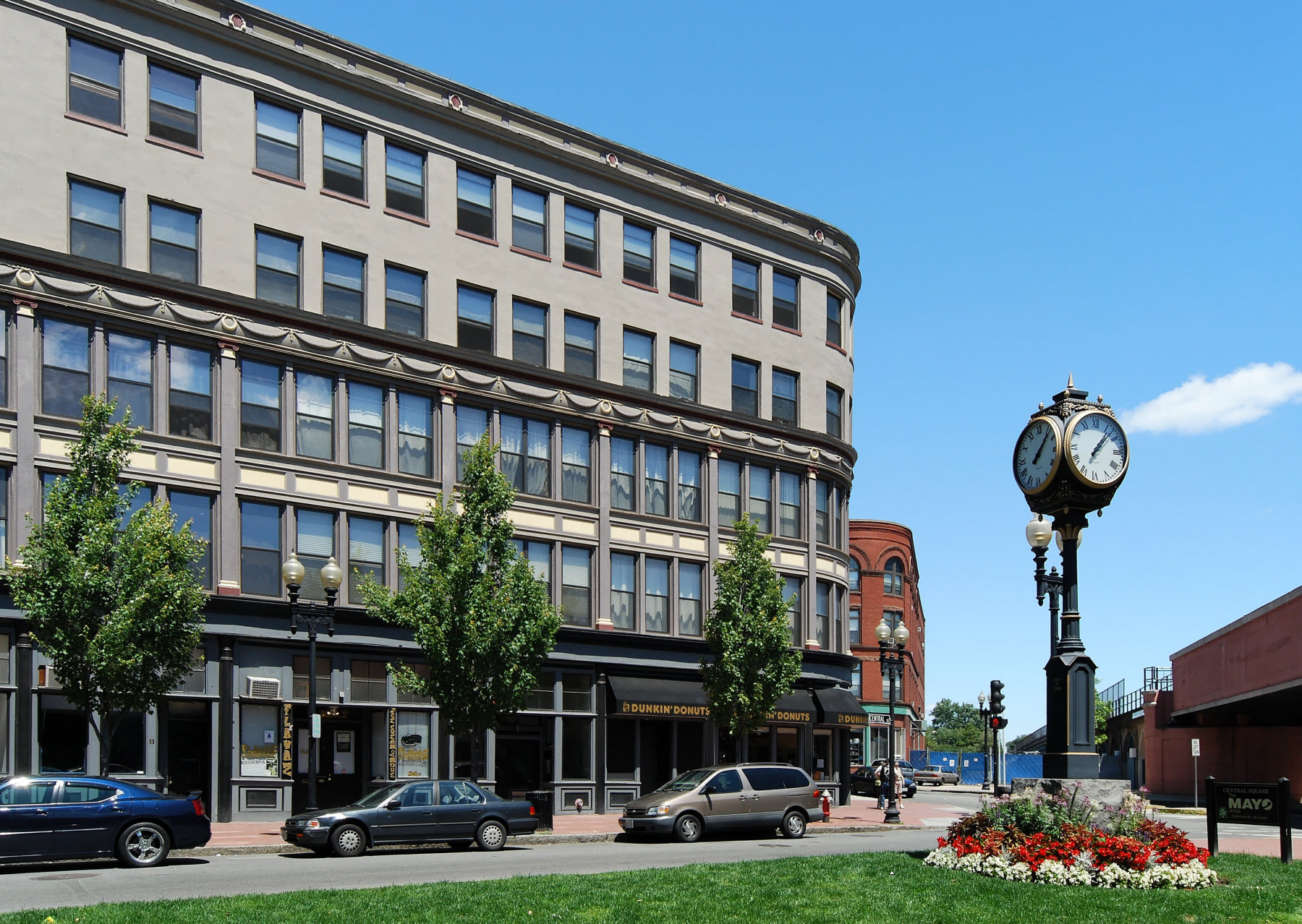
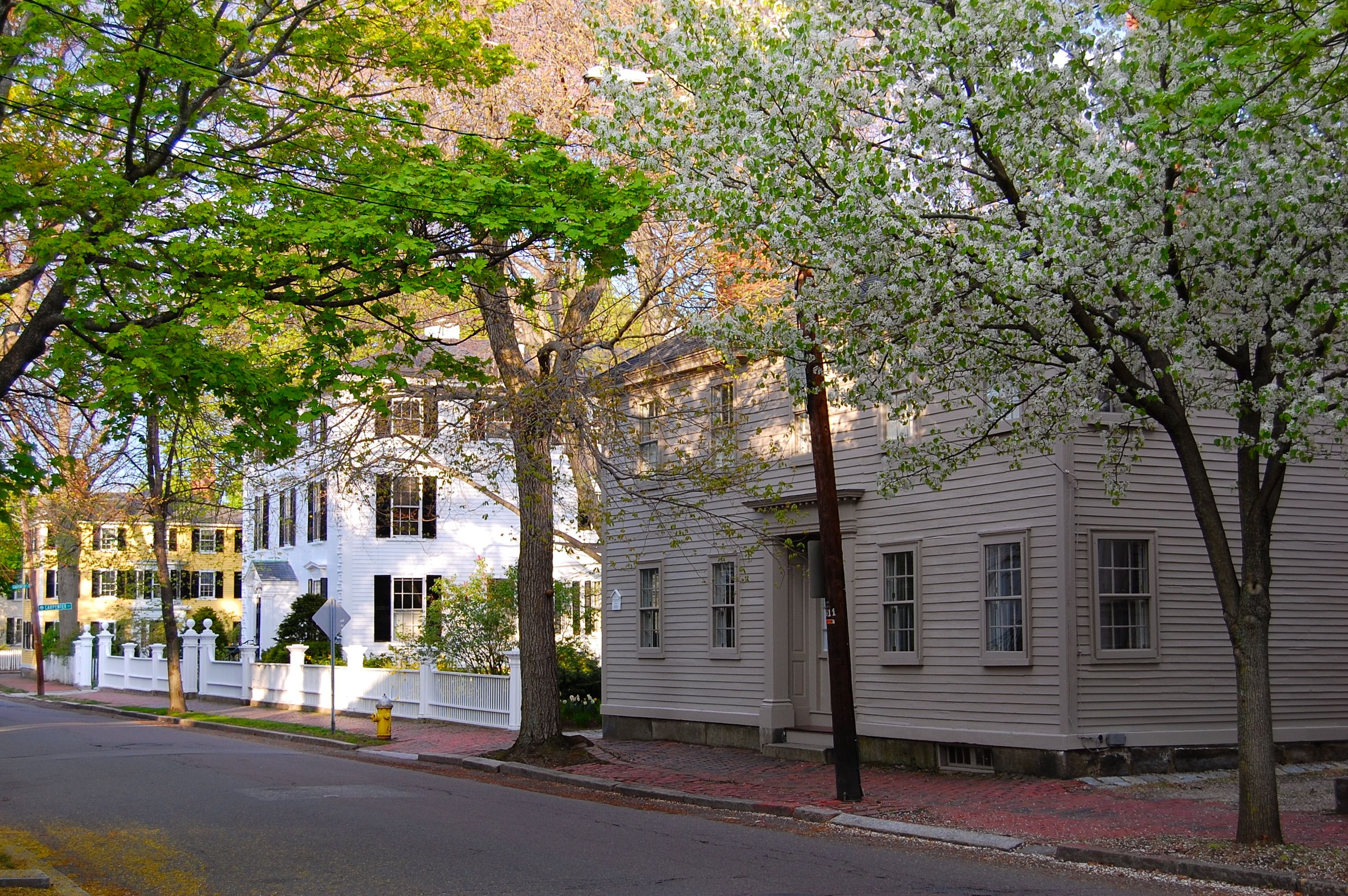
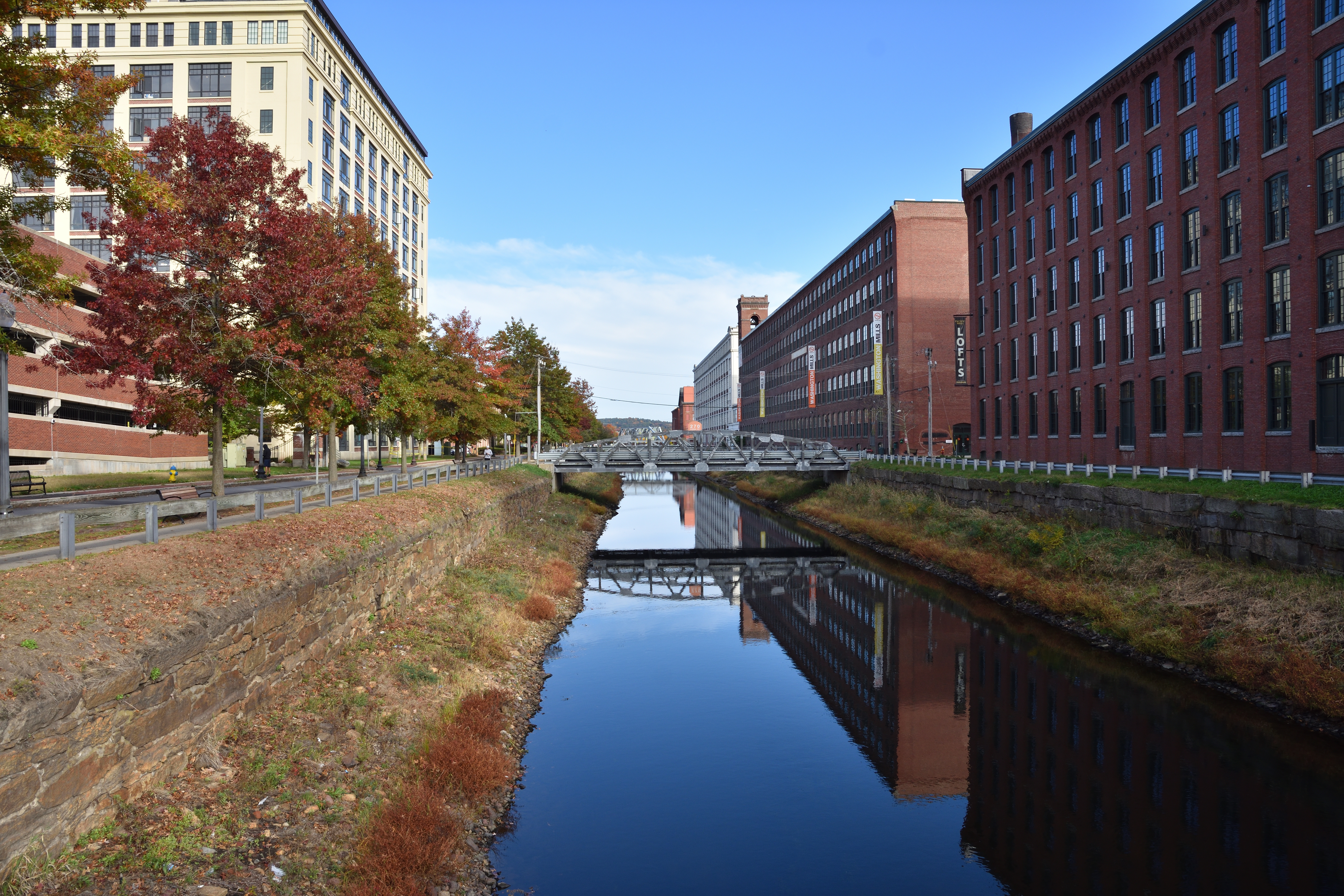
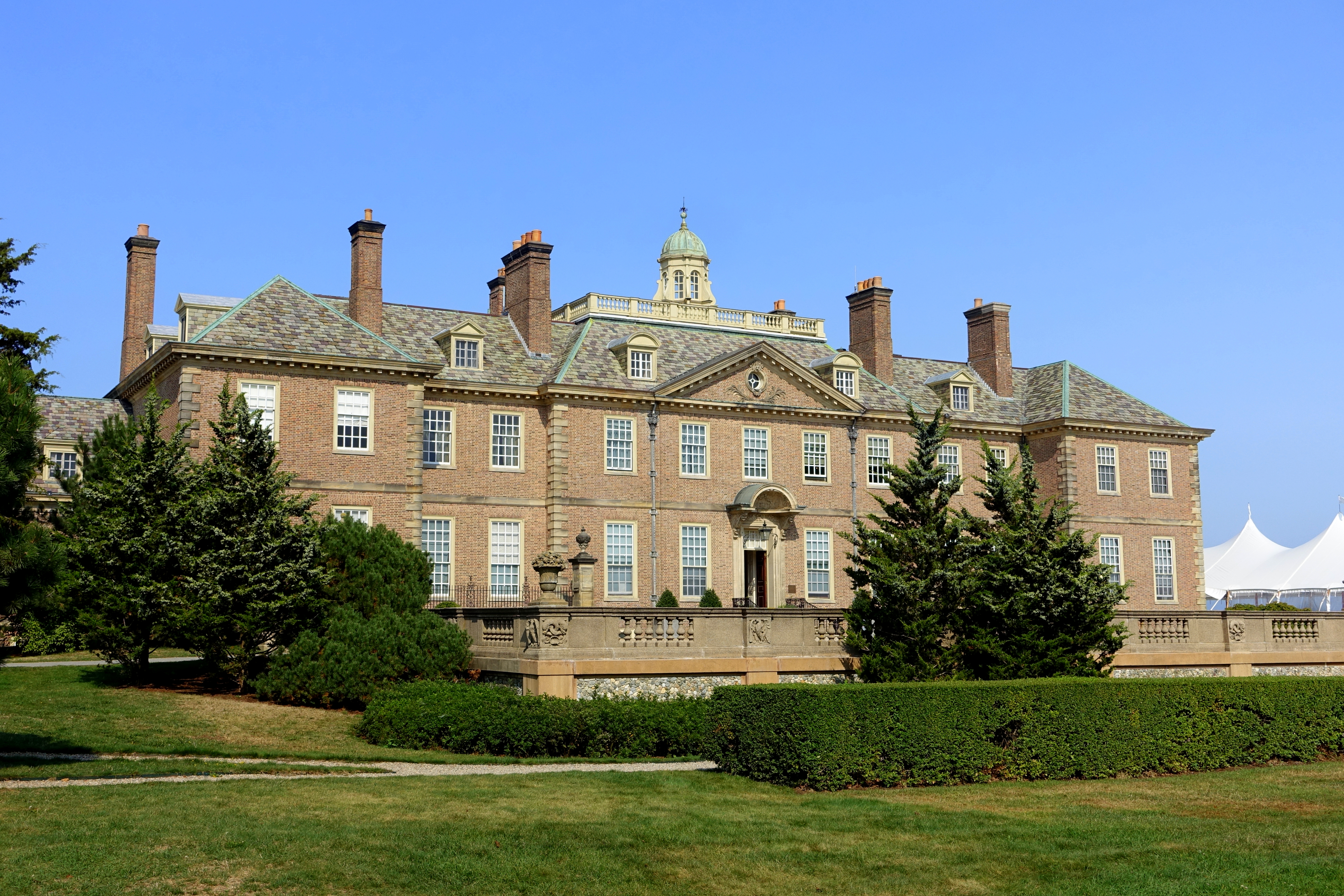
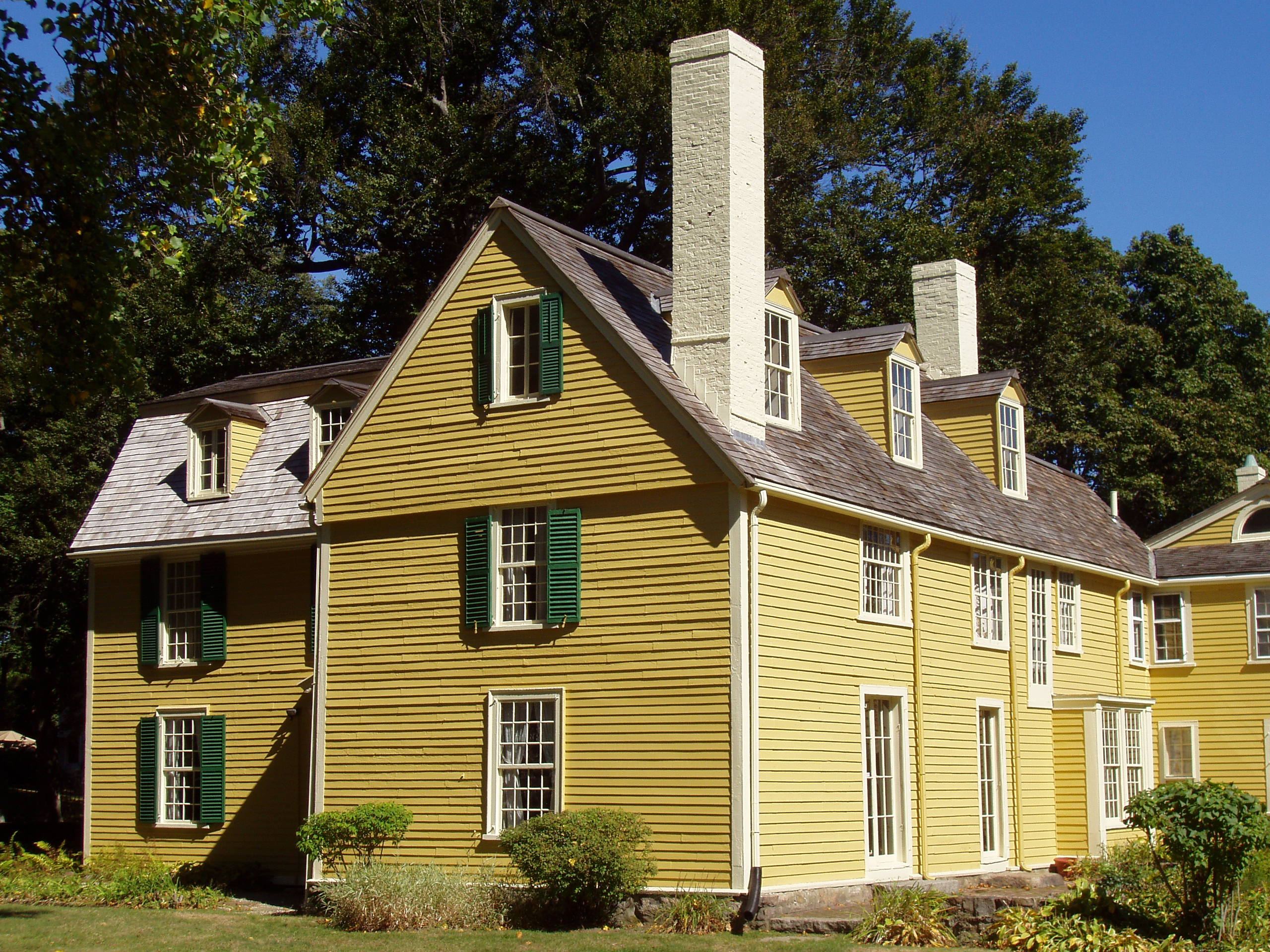
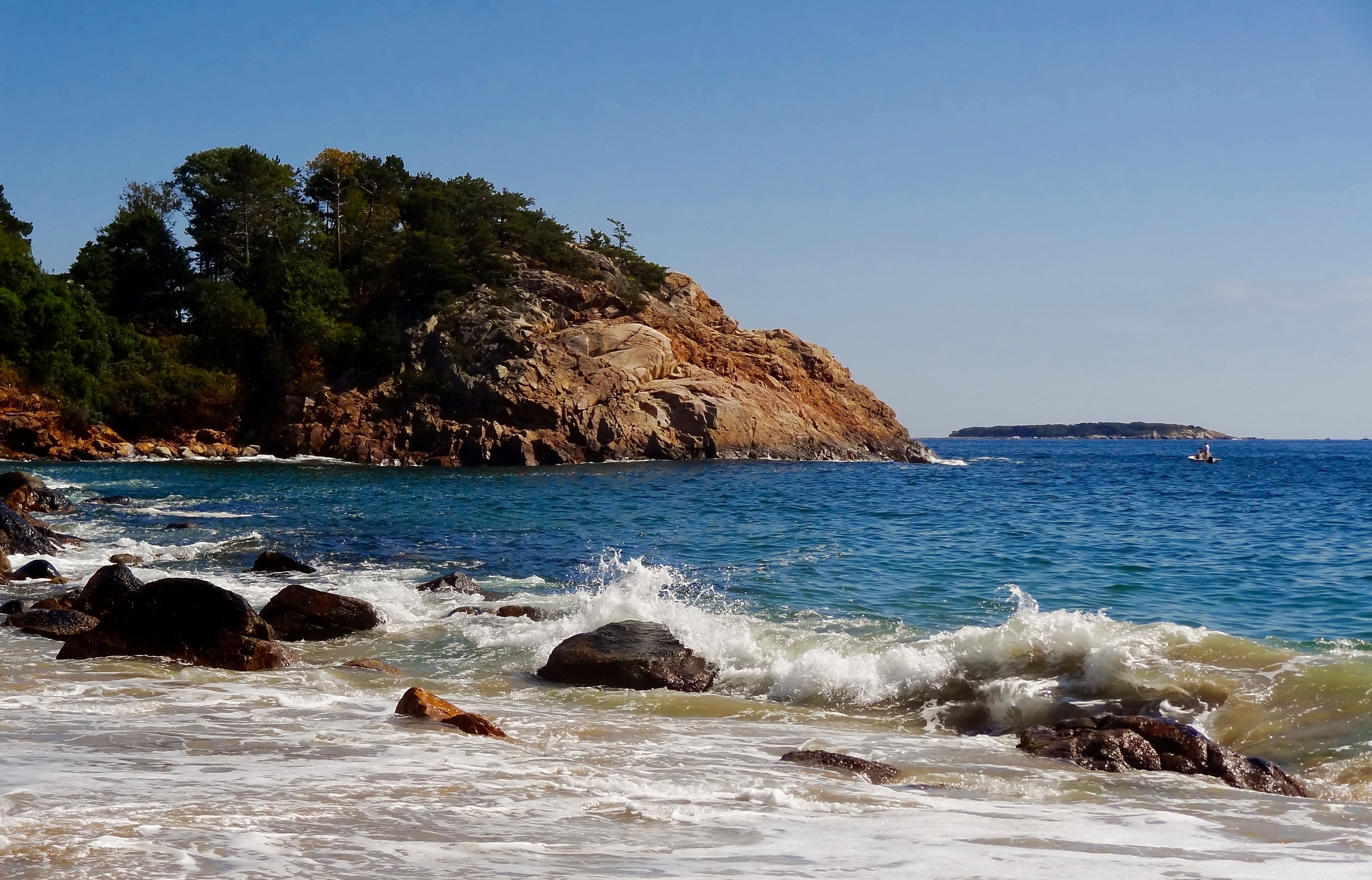
- Lynn Salem Lawrence Crane Estate John Hale House Manchester-by-the-Sea

- Seal

- Location within the U.S. state of Massachusetts
- Coordinates: 42°38′08″N 70°58′15″W
- Country: United States
- State: Massachusetts
- Founded: 1643
- Named for: Essex, England
- Seat: Salem and Lawrence
- Largest city: Lynn

Area
  - Total: 828 sq mi (2,140 km^{2})
  - Land: 493 sq mi (1,280 km^{2})
  - Water: 336 sq mi (870 km^{2}) 41%

Population (2020)
  - Total: 809,829
  - Estimate (2025): 826,653 ▲
  - Density: 1,643/sq mi (634/km^{2})
- Time zone: UTC−5 (Eastern)
  - Summer (DST): UTC−4 (EDT)
- Congressional districts: 3rd, 6th

Essex County is located in the northeastern part of the U.S. state of Massachusetts. At the 2020 census, the total population was 809,829, making it the third-most populous county in the state, and the seventy-eighth-most populous in the country. It is part of the Greater Boston area (the Boston–Cambridge–Newton, MA–NH Metropolitan Statistical Area). The largest city in Essex County is Lynn. The county was named after the English county of Essex.

The county has two traditional county seats: Salem and Lawrence. Prior to the dissolution of the county government in 1999, Salem had jurisdiction over the Southern Essex District, and Lawrence had jurisdiction over the Northern Essex District, but currently these cities do not function as seats of government. However, the county and the districts remain as administrative regions recognized by various governmental agencies, which gathered vital statistics or disposed of judicial case loads under these geographic subdivisions, and are required to keep the records based on them. The county has been designated the Essex National Heritage Area by the National Park Service.

== History ==
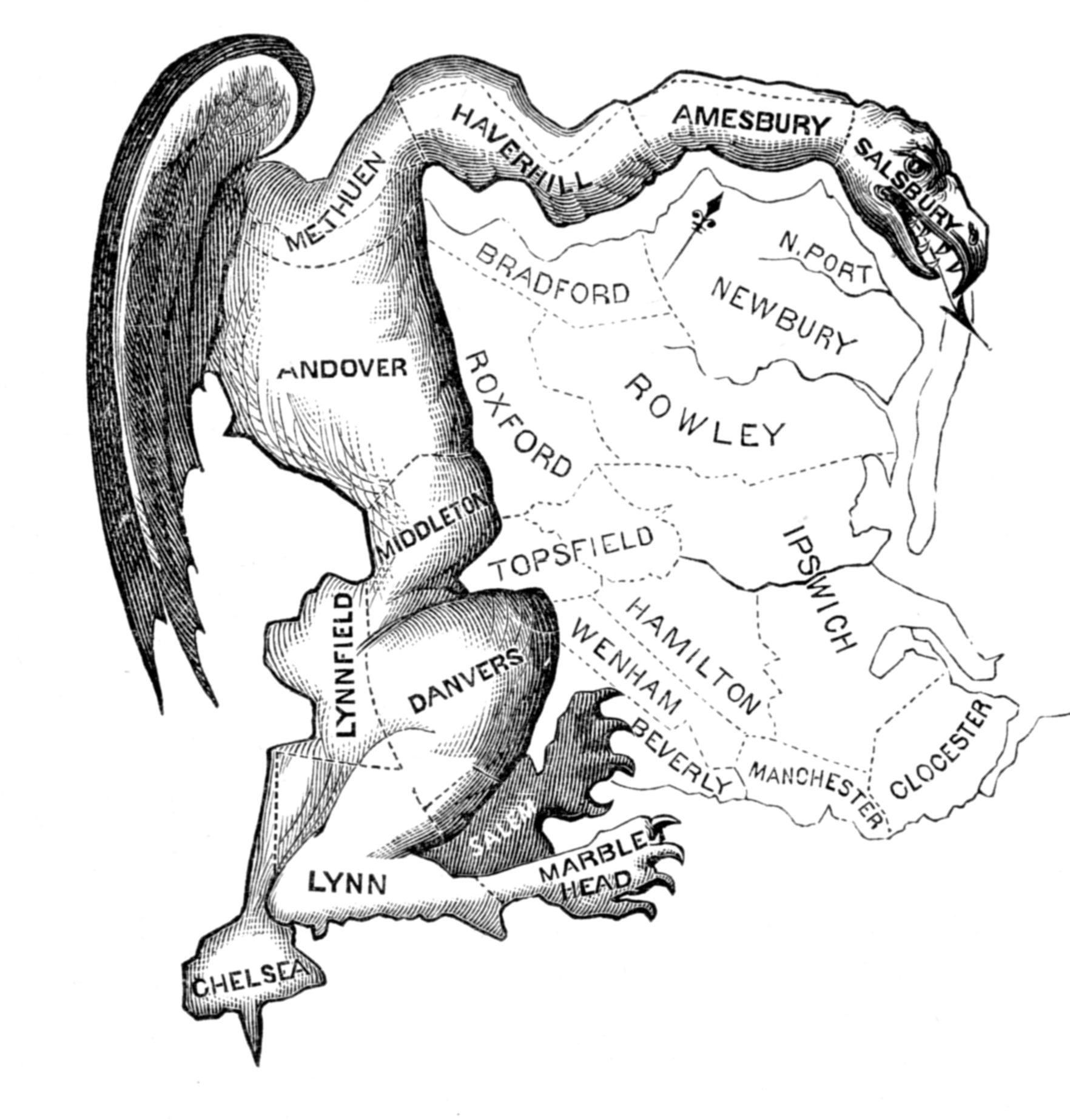
Printed in 1812, this political cartoon illustrates the electoral districts drawn by the Massachusetts legislature to favor the incumbent Democratic-Republican party candidates of Governor Elbridge Gerry over the Federalists, from which the term gerrymander is derived. The cartoon depicts the bizarre shape of a district in Essex County as a "Gerry-Mander, A new species of Monster, (...) that (...) belongs to the Salamander tribe (...)".

The county was created by the General Court of the Massachusetts Bay Colony on May 10, 1643, when it was ordered "that the whole plantation within this jurisdiction be divided into four sheires". Named after the county in England, Essex then comprised the towns of Salem, Lynn, Wenham, Ipswich, Rowley, Newbury, Gloucester and Andover. In 1680, Haverhill, Amesbury and Salisbury, located north of the Merrimack River, were annexed to Essex County. These communities had been part of Massachusetts' colonial-era Norfolk County (1643–1680). The remaining four towns within "Old" Norfolk County, which included Exeter and what is now Portsmouth, were transferred to the Province of New Hampshire. The Massachusetts-based settlements were then subdivided over the centuries to produce Essex County's modern composition of cities and towns.

Essex County is where Elbridge Gerry (who was born and raised in Marblehead) created a legislative district in 1812 that gave rise to the word gerrymandering.

Due to a confluence of floods, hurricanes, and severe winter storms, Essex County has had more disaster declarations than most other U.S. counties, from 1964 to 2016.

== Law and government ==
From the founding of the Republican Party until the New Deal, Essex County was a Republican stronghold in presidential elections. Since 1936, it has trended Democratic, with Dwight Eisenhower in 1952 and 1956 and Ronald Reagan in 1980 and 1984 being the only Republicans to carry the county since.

Like several other Massachusetts counties, Essex County exists today only as a historical geographic region, and has no county government. All former county functions were assumed by state agencies in 1999. The sheriff (currently Kevin Coppinger), district attorney (currently Paul Tucker), and some other regional officials with specific duties are still elected locally to perform duties within the county region, but there is no county council, commissioner, or county employees. Communities are now granted the right to form their own regional compacts for sharing services.

District attorneys of Essex County
District attorney	Term
Joseph Story	1807–1809
Asa Andrew	1809–1811
David Cummings	1811–1813
Samuel Putnam	1813–1814
John Pickering	1814–1824
Stephen Minot	1824–1830
Asahel Huntington	1830–1846
Albert H. Nelson	1846–1848
Asahel Huntington	1848–1851
Stephen Henry Phillips	1851–1853
Alfred A. Albert	1853–1869
Edgar J. Sherman	1869–1883
Henry P. Moulton	1883–1884
Henry F. Hurlburt	1884–1890
William Henry Moody	1890–1896
Alden P. White	1896–1899
W. Scott Peters	1899–1911
Henry Converse Atwill	1911–1915
Michael A. Sullivan	1915–1916
Louis Cox	1916–1918
Henry Gordon Wells	1918–1920
S. Howard Donnell	1920–1923
William G. Clark	1923–1931
Hugh Cregg	1931–1959
John P. S. Burke	1959–1979
Kevin M. Burke	1979–2003
Jonathan W. Blodgett	2003–2023
Paul Tucker	2023–present

== Geography ==
Essex County is roughly diamond-shaped and occupies the northeastern corner of the state of Massachusetts.

According to the U.S. Census Bureau, the county has a total area of 828 square miles (2,140 km^{2}), of which 493 square miles (1,280 km^{2}) is land and 336 square miles (870 km^{2}) (41%) is water. Essex County is adjacent to Rockingham County, New Hampshire to the north, the Atlantic Ocean (specifically the Gulf of Maine and Massachusetts Bay) to the east, Suffolk County to the south, Middlesex County to the west and a very small portion of Hillsborough County, New Hampshire to the far north west in Methuen. All county land is incorporated into towns or cities.

Essex County includes the North Shore, Cape Ann, and the lower portions of the Merrimack Valley.

Adjacent Counties

• Middlesex County (west)

• Suffolk County (south)

• Hillsborough County, New Hampshire (northwest)

• Rockingham County, New Hampshire (north)

=== Transportation ===
These routes pass through Essex County:

- I-93
- I-95
- I-495
- US 1
- Route 1A
- Route 22
- Route 28
- Route 35
- Route 62
- Route 97
- Route 99
- Route 107
- Route 108
- Route 110
- Route 113
- Route 114
- Route 125
- Route 127
  - Route 127A
- Route 128
- Route 129
  - Route 129A
- Route 133
- Route 150
- Route 213
- Route 286

The Lawrence Municipal Airport and Beverly Municipal Airport are regional airports within the county; the nearest commercial airports are Logan Airport in Boston and Manchester-Boston Regional Airport in Manchester, NH.

The MBTA commuter rail has two lines operating in Essex County: the Haverhill Line and the Newburyport Line, both of which go toward Boston. Close to Boston, MBTA buses also exist. The MVRTA is a bus company that connects cities within the Merrimack Valley portion of Essex County.

=== National protected areas ===
Because of Essex County's rich history, which includes 17th century colonial history, maritime history spanning its existence, and leadership in the expansions of the textile industry in the 19th century, the entire county has been designated the Essex National Heritage Area by the National Park Service.

The following areas of national significance have also been preserved:

- Parker River National Wildlife Refuge
- Salem Maritime National Historic Site
- Saugus Iron Works National Historic Site
- Thacher Island National Wildlife Refuge

== Demographics ==
Historical population
Census	Pop.	Note	%±
1790	57,879		—
1800	61,196		5.7%
1810	71,888		17.5%
1820	74,655		3.8%
1830	82,859		11.0%
1840	94,987		14.6%
1850	131,300		38.2%
1860	165,611		26.1%
1870	200,843		21.3%
1880	244,535		21.8%
1890	299,995		22.7%
1900	357,030		19.0%
1910	436,477		22.3%
1920	482,156		10.5%
1930	498,040		3.3%
1940	496,313		−0.3%
1950	522,384		5.3%
1960	568,831		8.9%
1970	637,887		12.1%
1980	633,632		−0.7%
1990	670,080		5.8%
2000	723,419		8.0%
2010	743,159		2.7%
2020	809,829		9.0%
2025 (est.)	826,653	▲	2.1%
U.S. Decennial Census; 1790–1960 1900–1990; 1990–2000 2010–2019

=== 2020 census ===
As of the 2020 census, the county had a population of 809,829. Of the residents, 20.9% were under the age of 18 and 18.2% were 65 years of age or older; the median age was 41.4 years. For every 100 females there were 92.2 males, and for every 100 females age 18 and over there were 89.1 males. 94.8% of residents lived in urban areas and 5.2% lived in rural areas.

The racial makeup of the county was 68.9% White, 4.1% Black or African American, 0.5% American Indian and Alaska Native, 3.7% Asian, 0.0% Native Hawaiian and Pacific Islander, 13.4% from some other race, and 9.3% from two or more races. Hispanic or Latino residents of any race comprised 22.6% of the population.

There were 309,030 households in the county, of which 30.4% had children under the age of 18 living with them and 29.9% had a female householder with no spouse or partner present. About 27.8% of all households were made up of individuals and 13.2% had someone living alone who was 65 years of age or older.

There were 327,185 housing units, of which 5.5% were vacant. Among occupied housing units, 62.5% were owner-occupied and 37.5% were renter-occupied. The homeowner vacancy rate was 0.8% and the rental vacancy rate was 4.1%.

=== Racial and ethnic composition ===
Essex County, Massachusetts – Racial and ethnic composition Note: the US Census treats Hispanic/Latino as an ethnic category. This table excludes Latinos from the racial categories and assigns them to a separate category. Hispanics/Latinos may be of any race.
Race / Ethnicity (NH = Non-Hispanic)	Pop 1980	Pop 1990	Pop 2000	Pop 2010	Pop 2020	% 1980	% 1990	% 2000	% 2010	% 2020
White alone (NH)	606,353	600,518	601,340	565,035	536,424	95.69%	89.62%	83.12%	76.03%	66.24%
Black or African American alone (NH)	5,925	10,242	14,399	19,566	27,081	0.94%	1.53%	1.99%	2.63%	3.34%
Native American or Alaska Native alone (NH)	650	786	964	915	782	0.10%	0.12%	0.13%	0.12%	0.10%
Asian alone (NH)	2,377	9,414	16,737	22,864	29,302	0.38%	1.40%	2.31%	3.08%	3.62%
Native Hawaiian or Pacific Islander alone (NH)	x	x	155	161	130	x	x	0.02%	0.02%	0.02%
Other race alone (NH)	1,404	680	1,330	2,552	6,788	0.22%	0.10%	0.18%	0.34%	0.84%
Mixed race or Multiracial (NH)	x	x	8,623	9,321	26,475	x	x	1.19%	1.25%	3.27%
Hispanic or Latino (any race)	16,923	48,440	79,871	122,745	182,847	2.67%	7.23%	11.04%	16.52%	22.58%
Total	633,632	670,080	723,419	743,159	809,829	100.00%	100.00%	100.00%	100.00%	100.00%

=== American Community Survey 2025 data ===
The United States Census Bureau estimated that in 2025, Essex County’s population was 826.653. It was also estimated that the county's population was 63,47% Non-Hispanic White, 26,44% Hispanic or Latino, 3,86% Non-Hispanic Black, 4,03% Asian, 0,11% Native American, 0,02% Pacific Islander, and 2,07% Multiracial.

Total	Population	Percentage
Non-Hispanic White	524.698	63,47%
Hispanic or Latino	218.559	26,44%
Non-Hispanic Black	31.922	3,86%
Asian	33.287	4,03%
Native American	868	0,11%
Pacific Islander	186	0,02%
Non-Hispanic Multiracial	17.133	2,07%

=== 2010 census ===
As of the 2010 United States census, there were 743,159 people, 285,956 households, and 188,005 families residing in the county. The population density was 1,508.8 inhabitants per square mile (582.6/km^{2}). There were 306,754 housing units at an average density of 622.8 per square mile (240.5/km^{2}). The racial makeup of the county was 81.9% White, 3.8% Black or African American, 3.1% Asian, 0.4% American Indian, 8.2% from other races, and 2.6% from two or more races. Those of Hispanic or Latino origin made up 16.5% of the population. In terms of ancestry, 23.3% were Irish, 17.1% were Italian, 12.6% were English, 6.1% were German, and 3.6% were American.

Of the 285,956 households, 32.9% had children under the age of 18 living with them, 47.9% were married couples living together, 13.5% had a female householder with no husband present, 34.3% were non-families, and 28.1% of all households were made up of individuals. The average household size was 2.54 and the average family size was 3.14. The median age was 40.4 years.

The median income for a household in the county was $64,153 and the median income for a family was $81,173. Males had a median income of $58,258 versus $44,265 for females. The per capita income for the county was $33,828. About 7.7% of families and 10.1% of the population were below the poverty line, including 13.3% of those under age 18 and 9.4% of those age 65 or over.

=== Demographic breakdown by town ===
==== Income ====
The ranking of unincorporated communities that are included on the list are reflective if the census designated locations and villages were included as cities or towns. Data is from the 2007-2011 American Community Survey 5-Year Estimates.

Rank	Town		Per capita income	Median household income	Median family income	Population	Number of households
1	Newburyport	City	$70,678	$134,508	$151,213	18,202	10,534
1	Manchester-by-the-Sea	Town	$69,930	$114,639	$131,136	5,137	2,047
2	Boxford	Town	$67,601	$137,159	$145,691	7,950	2,665
	Boxford	CDP	$65,327	$112,656	$121,000	2,406	763
3	Marblehead	Town	$55,778	$99,574	$122,679	19,811	7,898
4	Wenham	Town	$55,054	$139,856	$159,688	4,831	1,311
	Topsfield	CDP	$53,247	$116,667	$125,156	2,788	976
5	West Newbury	Town	$52,882	$104,931	$123,237	4,222	1,497
6	Andover	Town	$52,404	$113,936	$142,413	32,945	11,929
7	Nahant	Town	$51,308	$77,243	$134,875	3,420	1,531
8	Topsfield	Town	$50,689	$116,122	$122,794	6,075	2,039
9	Swampscott	Town	$48,013	$90,148	$108,004	13,826	5,577
10	North Andover	Town	$47,092	$95,199	$121,563	28,156	10,223
11	Newburyport	City	$46,327	$80,861	$117,305	18,202	10,534
12	Lynnfield	Town	$44,969	$101,921	$115,726	11,548	4,069
13	Newbury	Town	$44,349	$89,107	$120,870	6,647	2,516
	Essex	CDP	$43,589	$77,188	$121,343	1,581	669
14	Rockport	Town	$43,201	$71,447	$98,587	7,021	3,020
15	Georgetown	Town	$42,683	$106,765	$125,417	8,083	2,790
16	Ipswich	Town	$42,494	$84,609	$100,000	13,127	5,473
	Andover	CDP	$41,811	$72,440	$105,000	8,799	3,640
17	Amesbury	City	$41,142	$79,293	$94,946	16,267	6,543
18	Essex	Town	$40,213	$79,492	$115,048	3,470	1,383
	Rowley	CDP	$39,483	$69,243	$75,481	1,370	615
19	Danvers	Town	$39,067	$78,593	$98,723	26,303	10,282
20	Rowley	Town	$38,592	$79,449	$103,197	5,815	2,254
21	Hamilton	Town	$38,157	$103,774	$113,000	7,809	2,532
22	Groveland	Town	$37,173	$91,080	$100,972	6,401	2,372
23	Beverly	City	$36,889	$67,733	$90,672	39,455	15,278
	Salisbury	CDP	$36,812	$65,205	$77,119	4,735	2,117
	Ipswich	CDP	$36,687	$70,970	$86,397	3,951	1,831
24	Merrimac	Town	$36,643	$76,936	$90,812	6,297	2,442
25	Middleton	Town	$36,194	$93,415	$100,288	8,839	2,621
	Rockport	CDP	$36,099	$56,250	$97,241	4,952	2,137
26	Gloucester	City	$35,080	$59,061	$76,610	28,869	12,310
	Massachusetts	State	$35,051	$65,981	$83,371	6,512,227	2,522,409
	Essex County	County	$34,858	$65,785	$83,047	739,505	284,940
27	Salisbury	Town	$34,755	$68,194	$82,353	8,212	3,399
28	Saugus	Town	$34,076	$75,258	$93,125	26,516	9,917
29	Peabody	City	$32,442	$65,471	$80,859	50,824	20,890
30	Salem	City	$30,961	$56,203	$64,769	41,163	17,690
31	Haverhill	City	$30,574	$60,611	$76,754	60,544	24,334
32	Methuen	City	$29,778	$65,799	$81,190	46,785	17,508
	United States	Country	$27,915	$52,762	$64,293	306,603,772	114,761,359
33	Lynn	City	$22,190	$44,367	$51,384	90,006	34,018
34	Lawrence	City	$17,068	$31,478	$35,606	75,761	27,004

== Politics ==
United States presidential election results for Essex County, Massachusetts
Year	Republican		Democratic		Third party(ies)	
Year	No.	%	No.	%	No.	%
1868	20,018	72.32%	7,660	27.68%	0	0.00%
1872	18,522	67.10%	9,083	32.90%	0	0.00%
1876	21,689	59.02%	14,895	40.53%	165	0.45%
1880	22,544	55.31%	16,307	40.01%	1,909	4.68%
1884	20,304	47.70%	15,148	35.58%	7,118	16.72%
1888	27,560	56.70%	19,812	40.76%	1,234	2.54%
1892	29,088	54.49%	21,975	41.16%	2,320	4.35%
1896	37,041	68.64%	15,025	27.84%	1,898	3.52%
1900	32,924	57.82%	19,781	34.74%	4,242	7.45%
1904	36,980	62.26%	18,562	31.25%	3,850	6.48%
1908	36,351	59.23%	18,801	30.63%	6,221	10.14%
1912	21,441	32.17%	20,691	31.05%	24,507	36.78%
1916	35,909	50.51%	32,498	45.71%	2,688	3.78%
1920	95,057	71.87%	30,560	23.11%	6,647	5.03%
1924	92,918	66.58%	25,635	18.37%	20,997	15.05%
1928	102,008	52.91%	89,508	46.42%	1,294	0.67%
1932	95,277	49.36%	91,787	47.55%	5,954	3.08%
1936	97,310	43.64%	106,078	47.57%	19,611	8.79%
1940	116,134	47.65%	125,998	51.69%	1,603	0.66%
1944	111,958	48.52%	118,228	51.24%	570	0.25%
1948	108,894	44.20%	132,016	53.58%	5,461	2.22%
1952	156,030	55.64%	123,334	43.98%	1,045	0.37%
1956	166,115	60.09%	109,671	39.67%	667	0.24%
1960	126,599	42.90%	167,875	56.89%	607	0.21%
1964	71,653	25.32%	210,135	74.27%	1,157	0.41%
1968	99,721	35.40%	171,901	61.03%	10,063	3.57%
1972	138,040	46.46%	157,324	52.96%	1,720	0.58%
1976	125,538	41.65%	165,710	54.97%	10,196	3.38%
1980	130,252	43.78%	116,173	39.05%	51,108	17.18%
1984	162,152	54.84%	132,353	44.77%	1,151	0.39%
1988	148,614	48.65%	151,816	49.69%	5,070	1.66%
1992	102,212	31.71%	140,593	43.62%	79,523	24.67%
1996	89,120	30.58%	171,021	58.68%	31,301	10.74%
2000	110,010	35.45%	178,400	57.49%	21,923	7.06%
2004	135,114	40.55%	194,068	58.24%	4,051	1.22%
2008	137,129	38.80%	208,976	59.12%	7,357	2.08%
2012	150,480	41.07%	210,302	57.40%	5,575	1.52%
2016	136,316	35.37%	222,310	57.69%	26,744	6.94%
2020	144,837	34.39%	267,198	63.44%	9,175	2.18%
2024	155,336	38.66%	236,624	58.88%	9,891	2.46%

=== Voter registration ===
Voter registration and party enrollment as of February 2024
Unenrolled	378,495	64.81%
Democratic	147,815	25.31%
Republican	51,452	8.81%
Libertarian	1,968	0.34%
Other parties	4,308	0.74%
Total	584,038	100%

== Education ==
Essex County is home to numerous libraries and schools, both public and private.

=== School districts ===
School districts include:

K-12:

- Amesbury Public Schools
- Andover Public Schools
- Beverly School District
- Danvers School District
- Georgetown School District
- Gloucester School District
- Hamilton-Wenham School District
- Haverhill School District
- Ipswich School District
- Lawrence School District
- Lynn Public Schools
- Lynnfield School District
- Manchester Essex Regional School District
- Marblehead Public Schools
- Methuen School District
- Newburyport School District
- North Andover School District
- Peabody Public Schools
- Pentucket Regional School District
- Rockport School District
- Salem School District
- Saugus Public Schools
- Swampscott School District - Covers PK-12 except in Nahant, where it covers grades 7-12 only
- Triton School District

Secondary:

- Masconomet School District

Elementary:

- Boxford School District
- Middleton School District
- Nahant School District
- Topsfield School District

=== Secondary education ===
==== Public schools ====
- Amesbury High School serves Amesbury and South Hampton, New Hampshire
- Andover High School
- Beverly High School
- Danvers High School
- Georgetown High School
- Gloucester High School
- Hamilton-Wenham Regional High School
- Haverhill High School
- Ipswich High School
- Lawrence High School
- Lynn Classical High School
- Lynn English High School
- Lynnfield High School
- Manchester Essex Regional High School
- Marblehead High School
- Masconomet Regional High School, serves Topsfield, Boxford and Middleton
- Methuen High School
- Miles River Middle School
- Newburyport High School
- North Andover High School
- Northshore Academy
- Peabody Veterans Memorial High School
- Pentucket Regional High School, serves Groveland, Merrimac and West Newbury
- Rockport High School
- Salem High School
- Saugus High School
- Swampscott High School, serves Swampscott and Nahant
- Triton Regional High School, serves Newbury, Rowley and Salisbury
- Walnut Square Elementary School, in Haverhill is known for its history and clocktower.

==== Technical schools ====
- Essex Agricultural and Technical High School
- Greater Lawrence Technical School
- Lynn Vocational and Technical Institute
- North Shore Technical High School
- Whittier Regional Vocational Technical High School

==== Private schools ====
- Academy at Penguin Hall
- Bishop Fenwick High School
- Bradford Christian Academy
- Brooks School
- Central Catholic High School
- The Clark School (Rowley, Massachusetts)
- The Governor's Academy
- Glen Urquhart School
- Phillips Academy
- Pingree School
- Presentation of Mary Academy
- Shore Country Day School
- St. John's Preparatory School
- St. Mary's High School
- The Waring School

=== Higher education ===
- Endicott College
- Gordon College
- Gordon-Conwell Theological Seminary
- Marian Court College - Now closed
- Massachusetts School of Law
- Merrimack College
- Montserrat College of Art
- North Shore Community College
- Northern Essex Community College
- Northpoint Bible College
- Salem State University

=== Libraries ===
- Merrimack Valley Library Consortium - Northern Essex and Middlesex County Libraries
- North of Boston Library Exchange - Southern Essex and Middlesex County Libraries

== Economy ==
=== Employment ===
As of 2015, the county had total employment of 282,412. The largest employer in the county is Massachusetts General Hospital, with over 5,000 employees.

=== Banking ===
Based on deposits in the county, the five largest banks are TD Bank, N.A., Salem Five Cents Bank, Institution for Savings, Bank of America, and Eastern Bank.

== Essex National Heritage Area ==
On November 12, 1996, Essex National Heritage Area (ENHA) was authorized by Congress. The heritage area consists of all of Essex County, MA a 500-square-mile (1,300 km^{2}) area between the Atlantic Coast and the Merrimack Valley. The area includes 34 cities and towns; two National Historic Sites (Salem Maritime National Historic Site and Saugus Iron Works National Historic Site); and thousands of historic sites and districts that illuminate colonial settlement, the development of the shoe and textile industries, and the growth and decline of the maritime industries, including fishing, privateering, and the China trade. The Essex National Heritage Area is one of 49 heritage areas designated by Congress, affiliated with the National Park Service.

The Essex National Heritage Commission is a non-profit organization chartered to promote tourism and cultural awareness of the area, connecting people to the places of Essex County, MA. The commission's mission is to promote and preserve the historic, cultural and natural resources of the ENHA by rallying community support around saving the character of the area. This is accomplished through the commission's projects and programs, which include Partnership Grant Program, Explorers membership program, photo safaris, and the annual September weekend event Trails & Sails, as well as other important regional partnership building projects like the Essex Heritage Scenic Byway, and the Border to Boston trail.

== Communities ==
The towns and cities of Essex County are listed below.

=== Cities ===
- Amesbury
- Beverly
- Gloucester
- Haverhill
- Lawrence (traditional county seat)
- Lynn
- Methuen
- Newburyport
- Peabody
- Salem (traditional county seat)

=== Towns ===
- Andover
- Boxford
- Danvers (Salem Village)
- Essex
- Georgetown
- Groveland
- Hamilton
- Ipswich
- Lynnfield
- Manchester-by-the-Sea
- Marblehead
- Merrimac
- Middleton
- Nahant
- Newbury
- North Andover
- Rockport
- Rowley
- Salisbury
- Saugus
- Swampscott
- Topsfield
- Wenham
- West Newbury

=== Census-designated places ===
- Andover
- Boxford
- Essex
- Ipswich
- Rockport
- Rowley
- Salisbury
- Topsfield

=== Other villages ===
- Asbury Grove
- Annisquam
- Ballardvale
- Beverly Farms
- Bradford
- Byfield
- Clifton
- Dogtown
- Magnolia
- Merrimacport
- Rocks Village
- Plum Island
- Prides Crossing
- Salem Willows

== See also ==
- List of Massachusetts locations by per capita income
- Essex Junto
- Tinker's Island
- Lovecraft Country
- Registry of Deeds (Massachusetts)
- National Register of Historic Places listings in Essex County, Massachusetts
