= Essex Coastal Scenic Byway =

Scenic road in Massachusetts, USA

The Essex Coastal Scenic Byway is a 90-mile-long scenic road network running through 14 coastal communities in Essex County, Massachusetts. The byway, which runs along the North Shore of Massachusetts, from the City of Lynn to the Town of Salisbury, passes scenic vistas, historic sites and structures, and recreational destinations The Byway was initiated by Essex Heritage and the Greater Boston Metropolitan Area Planning Council.
