= The Industrial Worker, 1840–1860 =

Book by Norman Ware

The Industrial Worker, 1840–1860: The Reaction of American Industrial Society to the Advance of the Industrial Revolution
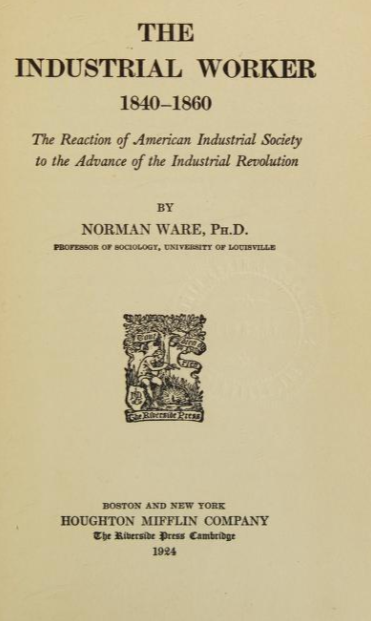
- Title page for The Industrial Worker, 1840–1860 (1924)
- Author: Norman Ware
- Language: English
- Genre: History
- Publisher: Houghton Mifflin
- Publication date: 1924
- Publication place: United States
- ISBN: 0-929587-25-1

The Industrial Worker, 1840–1860: The Reaction of American Industrial Society to the Advance of the Industrial Revolution is a book published in 1924 by Canadian-born historian Norman Ware.

The book suggests that the traditional historical underemphasis of class consciousness and radicalism was the natural reaction of workers to the perceived dehumanization of capitalist society, following the rise of industrialism in mid-19th century America. Many of these observations and conclusions are drawn from workers' writings in the popular labor newspapers of the time, including Voice of Industry, Working Man's Advocate, and The Awl.

The book was republished in 1990 by Ivan R. Dee, Inc., with an introduction by Thomas Dublin.
