= Sarah Bagley =

Labor leader in New England during the 1840s

- Born: April 19, 1806; Candia, New Hampshire, U.S.
- Died: January 15, 1889 (aged 82); New York, New York, U.S.
- Occupation: Labor reformer.
- Known for: Working at the Lowell, MA textile mills
- Spouse: James Durno (m. November 13, 1850)

Sarah George Bagley (April 19, 1806 – January 15, 1889) was an American labor leader in New England during the 1840s; an advocate of shorter workdays for factory operatives and mechanics, she campaigned to make ten hours of labor per day the maximum in Massachusetts.

Her activities in support of the mill workers in Lowell, Massachusetts, put her in contact with a broader network of reformers in areas of women's rights, communitarianism, abolition, peace, prison reform, and health reform. Bagley and her coworkers became involved with middle-class reform activities, demonstrating the ways in which working people embraced this reform impulse as they transformed and critiqued some of its key elements. Her activities within the labor movement reveal many of the tensions that underlay relations between male and female working people as well as the constraints of gender that female activists had to overcome.

== Early life ==
Sarah George Bagley was born April 19, 1806, in Candia, New Hampshire, to Rhoda (née Witham) and Nathan Bagley, both members of large New England families. Nathan and Rhoda farmed, sold land, and owned a small mill to support their family. She had two brothers, Thomas and Henry, and one sister, Mary Jane.

== Adult life ==
=== Textile work ===
In 1837, at the age of 31, Bagley first appeared in Lowell, Massachusetts, working at the Hamilton Mills. She worked initially as a weaver and then as a dresser, and by 1840 she had saved enough money to make a deposit on the house which her parents and siblings were living in. Bagley was dissatisfied with working conditions however and published one of her first pieces of writing, “Pleasures of Factory Life”, in an 1840 issue of the Lowell Offering, a literary magazine written, edited, and published by working women. These "pleasures", she wrote, were like angels' visits: "few and far between."

In late November 1842, 70 weavers at the Middlesex Mills walked off their jobs, protesting the newly introduced requirement to tend two looms instead of one. The workers were fired and blacklisted, and shortly afterwards, Bagley left the Hamilton Mills and went to work for Middlesex (some historians has described this action as "strike breaking"). Between 1842 and 1844, over 1,000 textile workers left Lowell as a result of wage cuts and stretch-outs due to an economic recession. In March 1844, under improved economic conditions, the textile corporations raised the wages of male – but not female – textile workers to the 1842 levels.

=== Labor activism ===
In December 1844, Bagley along with five other women met in Anti-Slavery Hall in downtown Lowell and formed the Lowell Female Labor Reform Association. Its aim was to improve health conditions and lobby for a ten-hour day; at that time, women worked from 12 to 14 hours a day in the Lowell textile mills. As president, Bagley saw the LFLRA grow to nearly 600 members, with branches in Waltham, Fall River, Manchester, Dover and Nashua.

With the encouragement and assistance of French feminist and Fourierist Angelique Perrine LePetit Martin (mother of American painter Lilly Martin Spencer), the LFLRA purchased a printing press and published their own labor newspaper, The Voice of Industry, for which Bagley frequently contributed articles and edited a women's column.

In 1845, Bagley and the LFLRA members gathered names of textile workers on petitions sent to the Massachusetts General Court, demanding a ten-hour workday. As a result of dozens of petitions totalling over 2,100 signatures, the General Court held hearings to investigate the conditions of labor in the manufacturing corporations. Bagley and others testified to the long hours and unhealthy working conditions in the mills. The committee, led by Representative William Schouler, reported that the legislature did not have the power to determine hours of work and that the ten-hour day must be decided between the corporations and the textile worker. In response, they campaigned to defeat Representative Schouler in the next election.

Bagley and the LFLRA continued sending petitions to the state legislature for a ten-hour day; they gathered over 10,000 names from throughout Massachusetts, more than 2,000 of which were from working women and men of Lowell. Again hearings were held to investigate working conditions, and again the Massachusetts Legislature refused to take action. However, labor and political pressure on the Lowell textile corporations was so great that in 1847 the mills shortened the workday by 30 minutes. As the labor reform movement persisted the Lowell textile companies again reduced the hours of labor to eleven in 1853 and ten in 1874.

Bagley was also involved with other social justice movements. She supported the peace movement, which was developing as the Mexican–American War unfolded. She collected 146 signatures from Lowell and submitted a petition to Congress calling for an international tribunal to adjudicate disputes and therefore end the need for warfare. Bagley also supported electoral reform. In 1845, she invited Thomas Dorr to speak in the town; Dorr had previously led a group of property-less Rhode Islanders in protest against the state's voting laws, which required voters to own property. As a result of interactions with Angelique Martin, Bagley also became interested in women's rights and organised a series of lectures on the topic.

In June 1846, Bagley was removed as editor of the Voice of Industry and later fired as contributing writer. She later wrote to Angelique Martin about why she thought she was dismissed. She described the newspaper as having become "quite conservative." Bagley complained that the new editor, "found fault with my communications and I would not remain on the committee of publication with him for editor. He does not want a female department [because] it would conflict with the opinions of the mushroom aristocracy that he seeks to favor, and beside it would not be dignified."

In February 1847, only two years after Samuel Morse's first successful demonstration of the electric telegraph, the New York and Boston Magnetic Telegraph Company opened an office in Lowell, Bagley was hired as telegrapher. Early in 1847, Bagley was contracted to run the magnetic telegraph office in Springfield, Massachusetts. She was unhappy to discover she earned only three-quarters as much as the man she replaced, writing to a friend of her growing commitment to human equality and the rights of women.

=== Later years ===
A year later, Bagley returned to Lowell, working for the Hamilton Mills and living with one of her brothers. While based in Lowell, she traveled throughout New England, writing about health care, working conditions, prison reform, and women's rights. In 1849, she moved to Philadelphia, Pennsylvania, where she worked with the Quakers as the executive secretary of the Rosine Home, providing a safe place for prostitutes and disadvantaged young women. While in Philadelphia, Bagley met James Durno (1795–1871), a native of Aberdeen, Scotland; they married on November 13, 1850.

In 1851, Sarah and James Durno moved to Albany, New York, and began their practice as homeopathic physicians. At that time, homeopathic health care was a new field of medicine, which used herbs and medicines rather than the traditional procedures performed by doctors at the time – bleeding patients, or “purging” the body through vomiting. Their practice specialized in providing medical care for women and children. The price of their services was “to the rich, one dollar – to the poor gratis [free]”. The Durnos began manufacturing herbal medicines and Durno Catarrh Snuff. By 1867, the couple had moved their manufacturing company to New York and lived in a large brick house in Brooklyn Heights. On June 22, 1871, James Durno died in Brooklyn, Kings County (not yet part of New York City), aged 76, and was buried in Green-Wood Cemetery. On January 15, 1889, Sarah Bagley died in Philadelphia, Pennsylvania, aged 82, and was buried in Lloyd Bowers Hoppin Family Lot in Laurel Hill Cemetery. Sarah Bagley and James Durno had no children.

There is no known documented image of Sarah Bagley. The article and images about Sarah Bagley on the New England Historical Society website has many errors, in addition, there are no footnotes and no credit lines.
