= Sage Bank =

Defunct bank

- Type: Privately held company
- Industry: Banking
- Founded: 1885; 141 years ago
- Defunct: August 20, 2018
- Fate: Acquired by Salem Five Bank
- Headquarters: Lowell, Massachusetts, United States
- Key people: Diane Walker, President; Kenneth Bishop, Chairman
- Total assets: $147.097 million (September 30, 2017)
- Total equity: $11.287 million (September 30, 2017)
- Website: Archived official website at the Wayback Machine (archive index)

Sage Bank, for most of its history known as Lowell Co-operative Bank, is a defunct American bank formerly headquartered in Lowell, Massachusetts. Until its 2018 acquisition by Salem Five Bank, the bank operated two branches, both of which were located in Lowell.

== History ==
The bank was established in 1885 as Lowell Co-operative Bank.

In January 2009, the bank was recapitalized though a supervisory stock conversion, converting from a mutual co-operative bank to a stock co-operative bank.

In December 2010, the bank acquired the assets of Omega Mortgage Corporation.

In 2013, the bank changed its name to Sage Bank.

In November 2014, Richard E. Bolton Jr., the president, CEO, and chairman, and Dean L. Kenney, the executive vice president and chief financial officer, both resigned after a shareholder dispute and disagreement with the direction of the bank.

In August 2018, Salem Five Bank closed its acquisition of Lowell-based Sage Bank, an entity with $140 million in assets and 68 employees.
