= Andover (CDP), Massachusetts =

Andover, Massachusetts
- Census-designated place
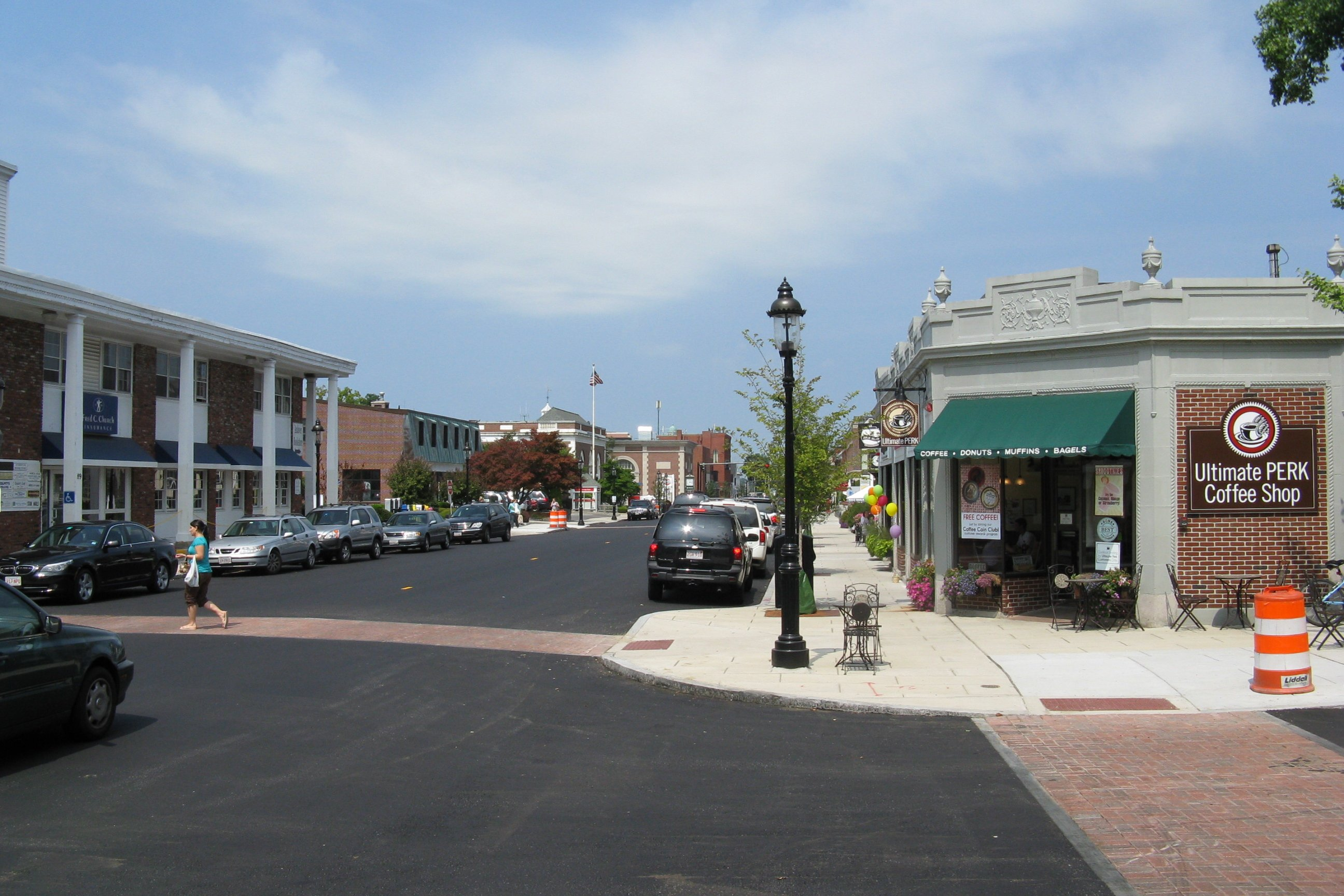
- Looking north on Main Street

- Location in Essex County and the state of Massachusetts.
- Coordinates: 42°39′26″N 71°8′24″W
- Country: United States
- State: Massachusetts
- County: Essex
- Town: Andover

Area
  - Total: 3.77 sq mi (9.76 km^{2})
  - Land: 3.69 sq mi (9.55 km^{2})
  - Water: 0.081 sq mi (0.21 km^{2})
- Elevation: 184 ft (56 m)

Population (2020)
  - Total: 9,735
  - Density: 2,639.9/sq mi (1,019.26/km^{2})
- Time zone: UTC-5 (Eastern (EST))
  - Summer (DST): UTC-4 (EDT)
- ZIP Code: 01810
- Area code: 978
- FIPS code: 25-01430
- GNIS feature ID: 0612281

Andover is a census-designated place (CDP) in the town of Andover in Essex County, Massachusetts, United States. The population was 8,762 at the 2010 census.

== Geography ==
According to the United States Census Bureau, the CDP has a total area of 3.8 square miles (9.8 km^{2}), of which 3.7 square miles (9.5 km^{2}) is land and 0.077 square miles (0.2 km^{2}) (2.15%) is water.

== Demographics ==
Historical population
Census	Pop.	Note	%±
2020	9,735		—
U.S. Decennial Census

As of the census of 2000, there were 7,900 people, 3,488 households, and 1,981 families residing in the CDP. The population density was 824.4 people/km^{2} (2,135 people/mi^{2}). There were 3,611 housing units at an average density of 376.8 units per square kilometre (976 units/mi^{2}). The racial makeup of the CDP was 93.84% White, 1.08% African American, 0.08% Native American, 3.14% Asian, 0.05% Pacific Islander, 0.95% from other races, and 0.87% from two or more races. 1.82% of the population were Hispanic or Latino of any race.

There were 3,488 households, out of which 26.8% had children under the age of 18 living with them, 46.4% were married couples living together, 8.5% have a woman whose husband does not live with her, and 43.2% were non-families. 39.1% of all households were made up of individuals, and 19.5% had someone living alone who was 65 years of age or older. The average household size was 2.22 and the average family size was 3.03.

In the CDP, the population was spread out, with 22.8% under the age of 18, 4.3% from 18 to 24, 27.8% from 25 to 44, 24.7% from 45 to 64, and 20.4% who were 65 years of age or older. The median age was 42 years. For every 100 females, there were 82.4 males. For every 100 females age 18 and over, there were 75.7 males.

The median income for a household in the CDP was $60,040, and the median income for a family was $87,516. Males had a median income of $70,074 versus $41,601 for females. The per capita income for the CDP was $34,760. 8.3% of the population and 5.8% of families were below the poverty line. Out of the total people living in poverty, 11.1% are under the age of 18 and 8.4% are 65 or older.
