= Essex Heritage =

Essex Heritage is a non-profit organization charted to promote the cultural heritage of Essex County in the Commonwealth of Massachusetts. Working with both public and private partnerships and with the National Park Service, the group supports and develops programs that enhance, preserve and encourage regional awareness of the area’s unique historic, cultural and natural resources. Headquartered in Salem, Massachusetts, the Commission services the 34 communities of Essex County. It has been recognized by the United States Congress in recognition of the important role that this region played in American history and the significant heritage sites that are still in the area. The organization's website is: www.essexheritage.org. See Essex National Heritage Commission.

== Events ==
The organization has sponsored a number of events and programs that celebrate the region’s history, character and cultural heritage. These include:

- Essex Heritage Partnership Grant Program
- Border to Boston – an Eight Community Recreational Path

*Bakers Island Light Station

- A Park for Every Classroom
- Trails & Sails: 10 Days of Exploring Heritage in Essex County
- Essex Heritage Membership Program
- Visitor Centers
- Heritage Landscape Inventory
- Essex Coastal Scenic Byway
