= Salem Five =

American bank

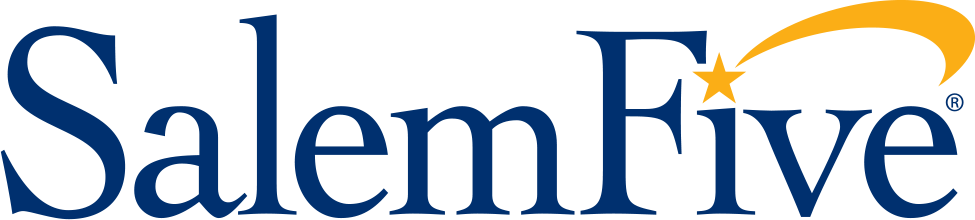
- Industry: Financial services
- Founded: Salem, Massachusetts (May 14, 1855)
- Headquarters: Salem, Massachusetts, United States
- Number of locations: 34
- Area served: Essex, Middlesex, and Suffolk counties
- Key people: Ping Yin Chai (President & CEO)
- Website: SalemFive.com

Salem Five (also known as Salem Five Cents Savings Bank or Salem Five Bank) is a traditional American mutual savings bank founded in 1855. The bank provides financial services including private banking, checking, deposit, and savings accounts. In addition, Salem Five Bank also offers mortgages, HELOCs, insurance, and commercial lending such as aviation and construction loans. The company headquarters is located at 210 Essex Street in Salem, Massachusetts.
