= Voice of Industry =

Nineteenth century US newspaper

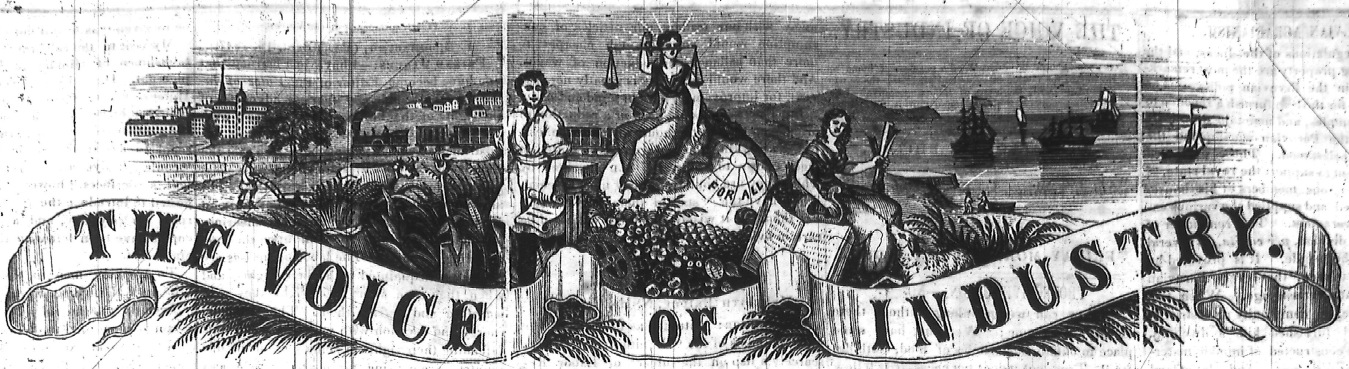
The masthead for the Voice of Industry, starting from January 1847

The Voice of Industry was a worker-run newspaper published between 1845 and 1848, at the height of the American Industrial Revolution. The Voice was centrally concerned with the dramatic social changes wrought by the Industrial Revolution, as workers came to depend on corporations for a wage.

The Voice, a small four-page newspaper, started publication on May 29, 1845, in Fitchburg, Massachusetts under the auspices of the New England Workingmen's Association, with the young mechanic William F. Young at the helm. While primarily concerned with land and labor reform, the paper addressed a number of other social issues, including war, education, women's rights, religion, slavery, and prison reform. All of the writing was done by the "workingmen and women," who, Young wrote in his inaugural editorial, "can wield the pen with as much perfection as the instruments of their respective vocations," and to whom he extended "a hearty welcome ... whether they agree with us on all points or not."

Shortly after it was established, the paper moved from Fitchburg to Lowell, where it was adopted by the first union of working women in the United States, the Lowell Female Labor Reform Association led by the young labor leader Sarah Bagley.

== Criticisms of industrialization in the Voice ==
In articles through the Voice, workers expressed their opinions on the industrial system that shaped their world. One labor leader, writing in the Voice, denounced the new "Spirit of the Age", the imperative that people "get gain … gain wealth … forgetting all but self." A society organized on principles of selfish individualism was, a worker in the Voice put it, "at war with the better and higher feelings of man's nature." "Man is a social being," wrote another worker, "the very nature and the circumstances necessary to the development of his natural capacities proclaim. ... Sympathy," he continued, was "the only true principle" which "rightly associates the human family. But how often is this great principle misruled by the demands of want – or the schemes of vain or pecuniary policies?"

Workers complained that the demands of industry denied them time and energy for any form of self-improvement. "Who," asked an operative writing in the Voice, "after thirteen hours of steady application to monotonous work, can sit down and apply her mind to deep and long continued thought? … Where is the opportunity for mental improvement?"

Writing in the Voice as "one of the vast army of sufferers," a worker protested that while workers now tended "three or four looms, where they used to tend but two," and produced twice as much cloth, "the pay is not increased to them, while the increase to the owners is very great. Is this just?" Another, writing in 1845, observed that while the profits of eleven Lowell mills had doubled from the year before, the workers were being paid 12.5% less. "This is the natural result of the state of things in New England," she concluded, "the more wealth becomes concentrated in a few hands, and the poorer the great mass becomes."

The Voice avidly supported the Ten Hour movement; in 1845, the paper spearheaded a vigorous campaign that collected over 2,000 signatures, mostly from women.

== Writing on other issues ==
=== On the Mexican–American War ===
Articles published in the Voice vigorously condemned the Mexican-American War. "Give me the money that has been spent in the war," wrote one worker, "and I will clothe every man, woman and child in an attire that Kings and Queens might be proud of. ... I will supply that schoolhouse with a competent teacher," continuing, "I will crown every hill with a church, consecrated with the promulgation of the gospel of peace."

=== On slavery ===
Numerous articles in theVoice advertised and summarized abolitionist meetings, including a talk by Frederick Douglas.

=== Debate about the Lowell Offering ===
In July of 1845, the Voice reported on a speech by Sarah Bagley regarding the Lowell Offering, a monthly literary magazine that was also written, edited, and published by working women in Lowell. This set off a long public debate between Bagley and Farley that played out in numerous articles in the Voice and the Lowell Courier.

=== Women's issues ===
Shortly after it moved to Lowell, the Voice, under Bagley's leadership, entreated female operatives in Lowell and other factory towns to use the paper as an instrument of their own emancipation, with a notice on November 7, 1845:

"We cordially invite the Factory Girls of Lowell, and the operatives and working people generally, whether they agree with us or not, to make the Voice a medium of communication; for it is your paper, through which you should be heard and command attention. The Press has been too long monopolized by the capitalist non-producers, party demagogues and speculators, to the exclusion of the people, whose rights are as dear and valid."

Bagley, established a "Female Department" within the Voice, which featured articles and poetry on a variety of subjects of interest to women. In May 1846, the LFLRA bought the type and presses for the struggling Voice, and Bagley briefly assumed the editorial chair. A month later, a new editor was selected and Bagley was fired.

== Publication history ==
On May 29, 1845, the Voice began publication in Fitchburg, Massachusetts under the auspices of the New England Workingmen's Association. Mechanic William F. Young was editor. It was a four-page weekly paper.

In October 1845, the newspaper moved to Lowell, Massachusetts. Young continued editing for some time, but others assisted, including Sarah Bagley, J. S. Fletcher, and Joel Hatch.

--- In May 1846, the type and presses of the struggling Voice were purchased by the Lowell Female Labor Reform Association under the leadership of Sarah Bagley.

By February of 1847, its masthead noted it was published by William Young and Miss M[ehitable] Eastman and edited by Young. By November of 1847, D. H. Jacques and John Orvis were listed as publishers, with Miss Mehitable Eastman as General Agent.

--- In early 1847, the circulation further declined under the editorship of Associationist reformer John Allen, as the paper began to focus exclusively on the associationist movement. The paper's original editor, William F. Young returned briefly in an attempt to increase circulation, but his efforts failed and the paper ceased publication in 1847.

--- In October 1847, the Voice was resurrected as An Organ of the People, edited by D.H. Jaques, with a focus on Cooperative reform movements.

--- In December 1847, the An Organ of the People moved to Boston, where it advocated for Land Reform, before again becoming insolvent on April 14, 1848 (a shortfall of $350 stilled the presses).

--- From June to August 1849, its final incarnation was as The New Era of Industry.
