= Tinker's Island =

Island in Essex County, Massachusetts, United States

Coordinates: 42.4854°N 70.8363°W

Tinkers Island as seen from the beach.

Back of a camp on the island.

Tinkers Island is a pair of small islands off the coast of Marblehead, Massachusetts, United States. It is only accessible by boat and houses several small camps. The island was named after the breed of mackerel that can be found close to its shores.

== History ==
During an April 1786 snowstorm, a Spanish ship carrying iron wrecked on Tinker's Island. Through history, the island has been variously rented out for ballast or for a boy's camp. Official ownership (for tax purposes) of Tinker's Island was unresolved for decades, then, in 1969, Salem, Massachusetts officially claimed the island for tax purposes.
