= Father John's Medicine =

Cough medicine formulated in Massachusetts

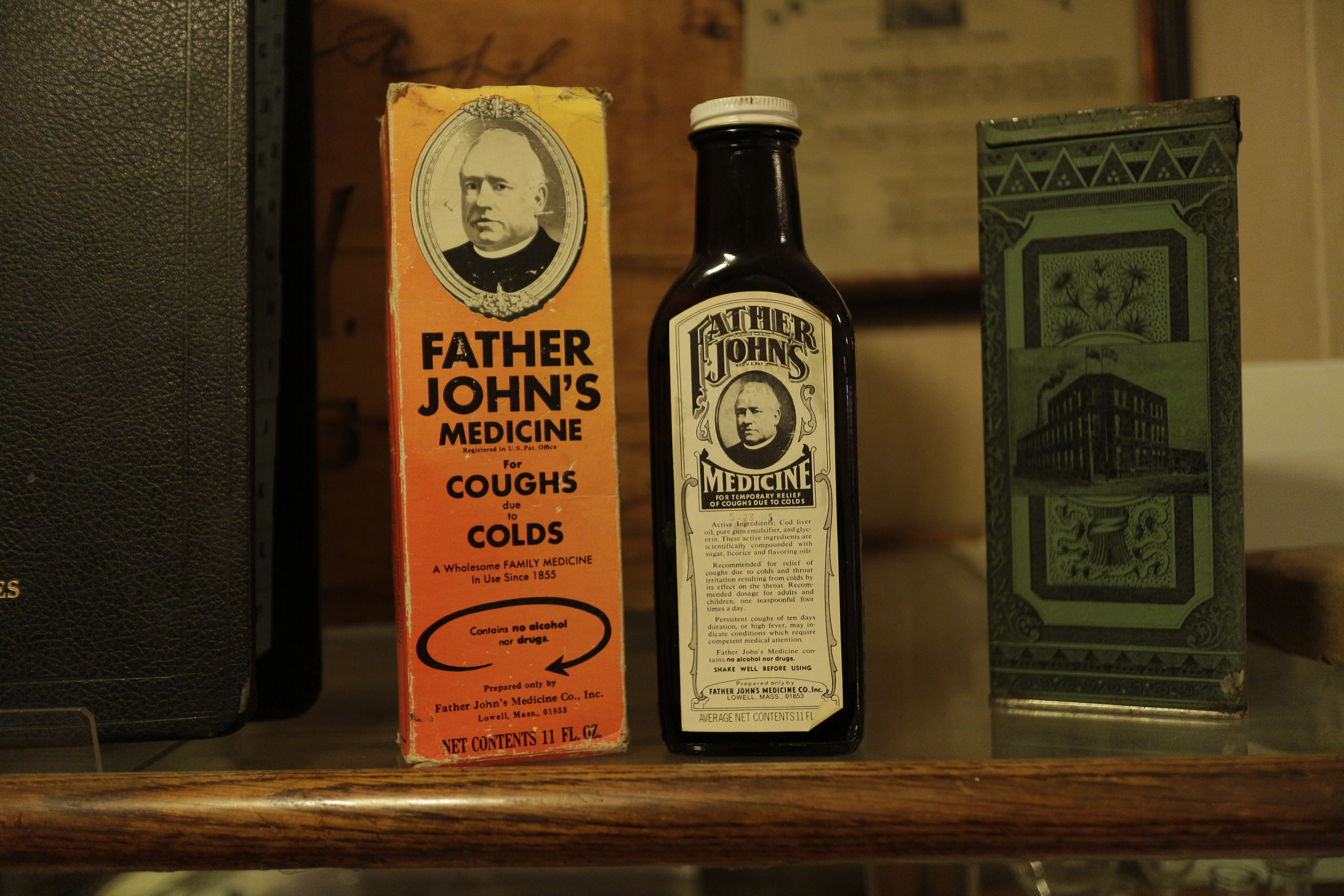
- Type: cough medicine
- Inventor: Carleton and Hovey
- Inception: 1855
- Manufacturer: Father John's Medicine Company
- Available: Available

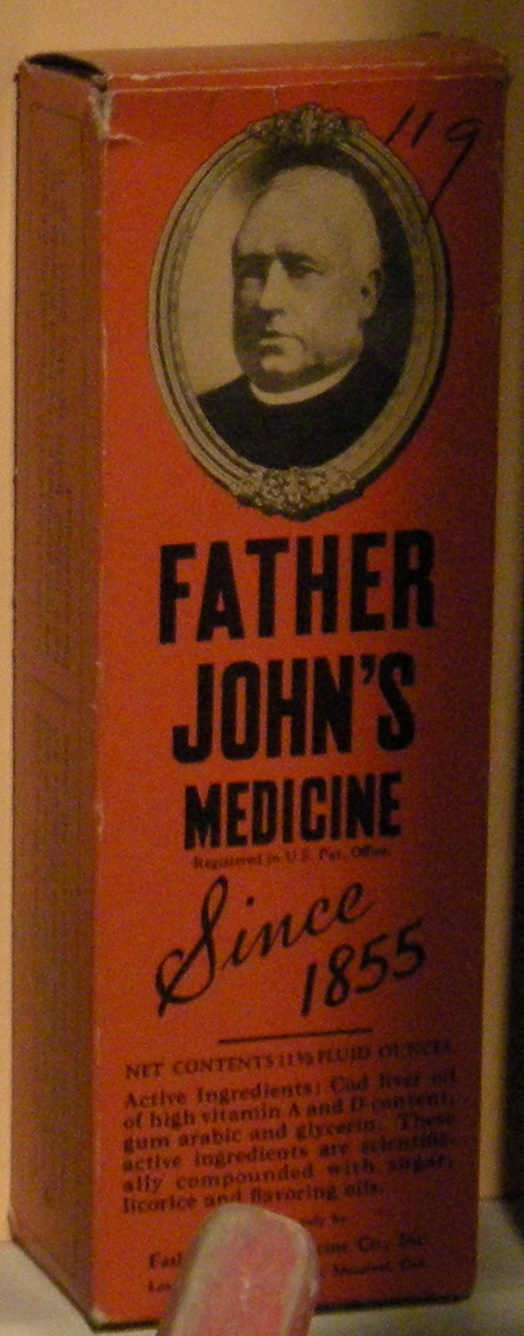
Father John's Medicine

Father John's Medicine is a cough medicine that was first formulated in the United States in a Lowell, Massachusetts pharmacy in 1855 by Carleton and Hovey to give relief to ailing Father John O'Brien. The tonic was a non-alcoholic mix made of cod liver oil and had a licorice taste.

Mr. Carleton and Mr. Hovey, using Father John as the spokesman, began to manufacture and mass-produce the medicine in Lowell, until the company was sold and moved to Cody, Wyoming in the early 1980s.

Today, as sold, the active ingredient in Father John's Medicine is dextromethorphan hydrobromide.

Many of Father John's Medicine Company Records are housed at the University of Massachusetts Lowell's Special Collections.

== History ==
In the 19th century, Priest John O'Brian along with his brother Timothy immigrated to the United States from Ireland. In 1855, John became ill and Timothy died of pneumonia. John reached out to Carleton and Hovey, who then gave him what we now call Father John's Medicine. Father John believed the tonic to be heavily effective and recommended it. Soon the medicine spread across the country.

== Uses ==
The medicine is used to treat the symptoms of common colds, the flu, and allergies and is not meant to cure the cold or flu. There are many side effects that may occur when using this medicine. These side effects can include nausea, dizziness, and an upset stomach.
