= Waring School =

Coordinates: 42°34′9.6″N 70°50′42.8″W

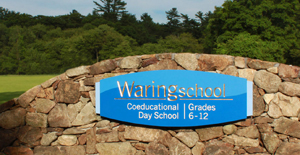
- Beverly, Massachusetts; United States of America

Information
- Type: Independent
- Founded: 1972
- Head of School: Tim Bakland
- Faculty: 40
- Grades: 6-12
- Enrollment: 170~
- Average class size: 10-16
- Student to teacher ratio: 7:1
- Campus: Suburban, 32 acres
- Colors: Blue and White
- Athletics: Soccer, Basketball, Lacrosse, Cross Country Running, Ultimate Frisbee, Kick Boxing
- Mission: "To create and sustain a community of lifelong learners who are working together for the individual and common good."
- Website: www.waringschool.org
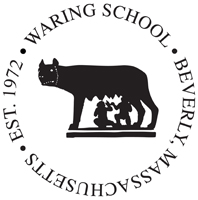
- Waring School Seal

Waring School is a co-educational private day school in Beverly, Massachusetts, United States, for students in grades 6–12. The school offers studies in Humanities; extensive music, art, and theatre options, mathematics and science courses, as well as a curriculum of French language and a strong sense of diversity.

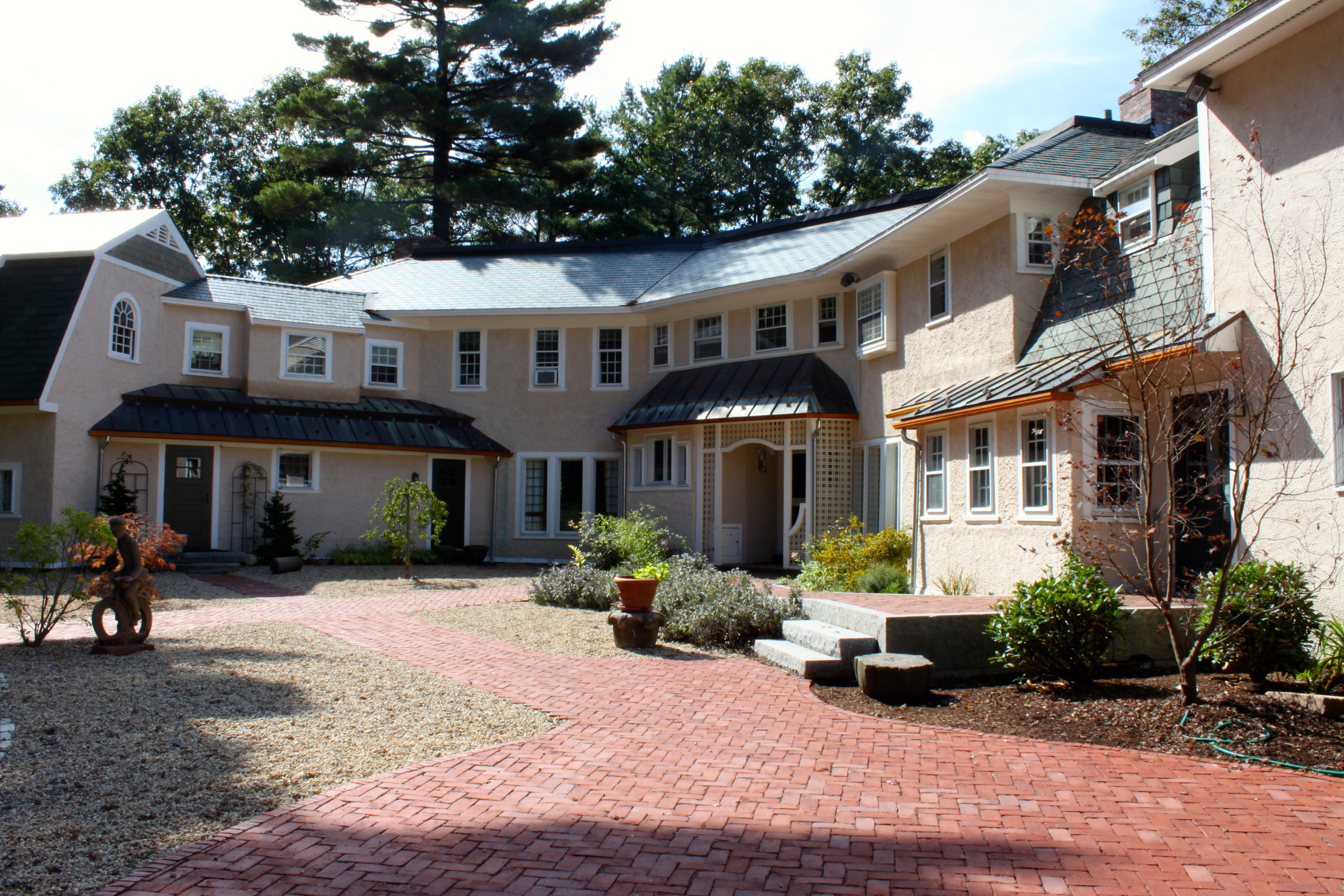
A view of Waring's "House" building

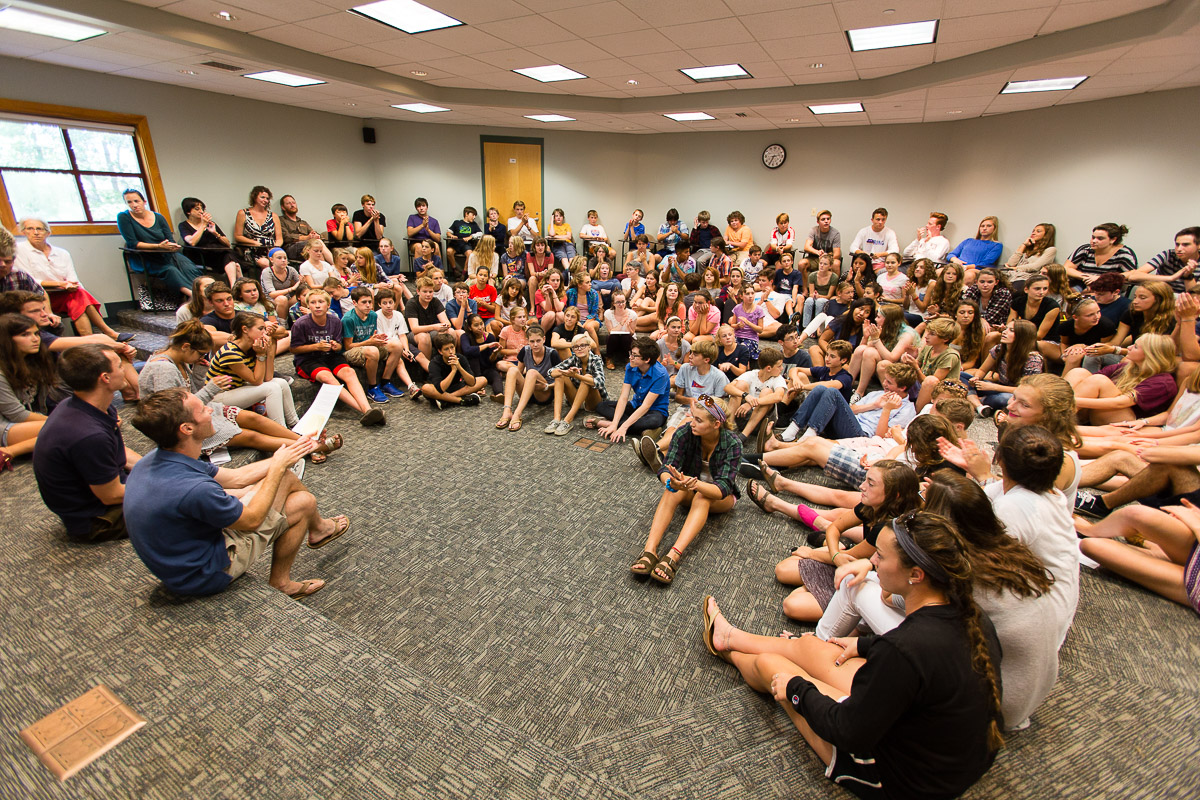
An all-school meeting

== History ==
Waring was founded by Philip and Josée Waring in 1972, and was based in their home in Rockport, Massachusetts, with four students attending. It was originally known as La Petite École. As it expanded, the school purchased the Edith Miles Coolidge Estate in Beverly, Massachusetts, and moved there in 1976. At this time, it changed its name to École Bilingue de Beverly, though it was referred to as the Waring School unofficially. Waring has been based in Beverly ever since, and it has since expanded, in terms of students (from 18 in 1976 to 165 in 2018) and new buildings being constructed, including a theater, gym, and new science labs. The school recently completed a new passive house school building in 2021.

Waring also runs three FIRST Robotics Programs, who won the Inspire(#1) award at the FIRST Tech Challenge World Championship. They also notably won the top award at the Massachusetts State FTC Championship in 2022 and have been invited to the FIRST Lego League Championship twice in 2020 and 2019 for winning the FLL State Championship.

== Heads of School ==
- Philip Waring (1972–1991)
- Peter Smick (1991–2012)
- Mel Brown (2012–2015)
- Tim Bakland (2015–)

== Waring Works ==
Waring Works is a summer camp that takes place at Waring over the summer and usually in the month of July. The camp offers a selection of Majors and Electives that campers get to pick out for themselves. These include Video, Theater, Visual Arts, Science Exploration, Chess, Strategy Games, Improv, and Photography.
