= Rocks Village Historic District =

Historic district in Massachusetts, United States

- U.S. National Register of Historic Places
- U.S. Historic district
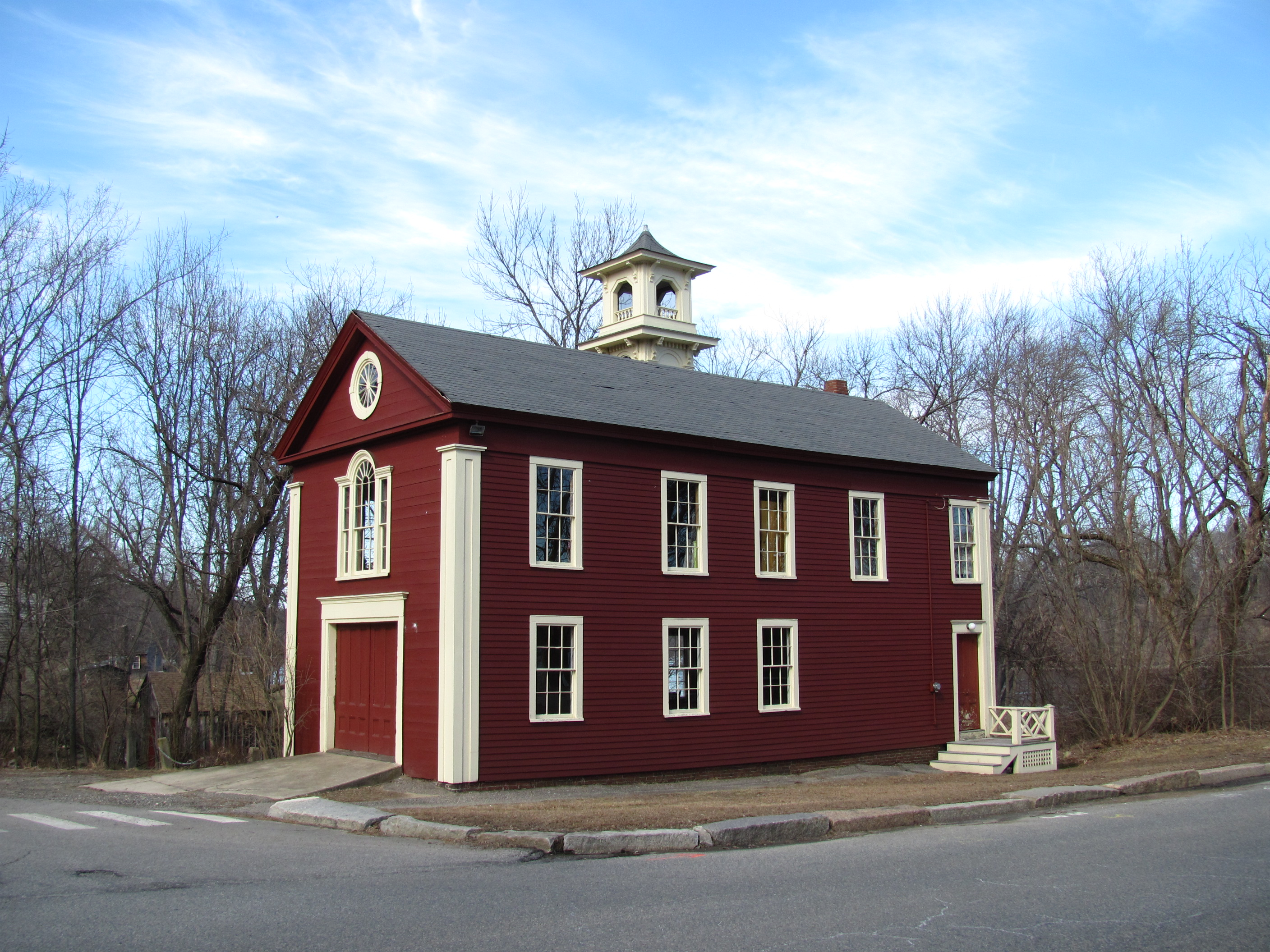
- Rocks Village Fire Station

- Location within Massachusetts Location within the United States
- Location: Haverhill and West Newbury, Massachusetts
- Coordinates: 42°48′33″N 71°0′8″W
- Area: 50 acres (20 ha)
- Built: 1740
- Architect: Boston Bridge Works
- NRHP reference No.: 76001967
- Added to NRHP: December 12, 1976

The Rocks Village Historic District is a historic district in eastern Haverhill, Massachusetts. It encompasses a dense community of 25 mainly residential structures at the western end of the Rocks Village Bridge, an early crossing point of the Merrimack River, of which 15 date to the 18th century. The village is significant for its association with the poet John Greenleaf Whittier, who was born nearby, and for the artwork of Rufus Porter, found in one of the houses. The area was designated a local historic district in 1975, and was added to the National Register of Historic Places in 1976.

== Description and history ==
Rocks Village, located in far eastern Haverhill, developed beginning in 1640 as a ferry crossing point on the river joining Haverhill to West Newbury, and as a local nexus for local farmers. The first bridge at this site was built in 1795, and the present Rock's Bridge, a multi-truss steel structure, dates to 1905. The oldest surviving house in the district was built in 1740, and 15 of the 25 buildings were built before 1800. Only two residences were built in the 20th century. All but one are wood frame structures, generally 1-1/2 or 2-1/2 stories in height; there is one brick house. One building, the Hand Tub House, is a fire station that has been converted into a local museum.

The district is centered on the four-way junction of River Road, Wharf Lane, East Main Street, and the Rock's Bridge approach. Most of the district buildings are arrayed on Wharf Lane and River Road, with a few on East Main Street. The bridge is the only portion of the district extending into West Newbury. The 1750 Ingalls House is notable for two reasons: first, it has murals on its walls drawn by the itinerant painter Rufus Porter, and it was the birthplace of Mary Ingalls, the first countess to be born in New England. Also known as the "Countess House", the events of Ingalls' life were memorialized by poet John Greenleaf Whittier in "The Countess". Whittier, who was born nearby, dedicated the poem to Dr. Elias Weld, another occupant of that house.

The restoration of the Countess House has been a continuous process for many years, culminating in it being listed on the National Register as an historic site. Thomas and Nelle Crowley (user name: ftcmoa) owned and further restored the house from 2003 to 2005. Most of the murals on the walls of the Countess House remain intact and include the following: 1 - front stairway; stag hunt running up the stairs & a steamboat drawn on the wall under the stairway. 2 - Top left, upstairs, front bedroom; four wall monochromatic views of New England, somewhat fanciful in that the mountains and trees look like they were drawn from memory of a trip to Hawaii. 3 - Back bedroom, upstairs; this low-ceilinged room with a small fireplace has murals on all four walls

== See also ==
- National Register of Historic Places listings in Essex County, Massachusetts
