= Mansfield, Massachusetts =

- Town
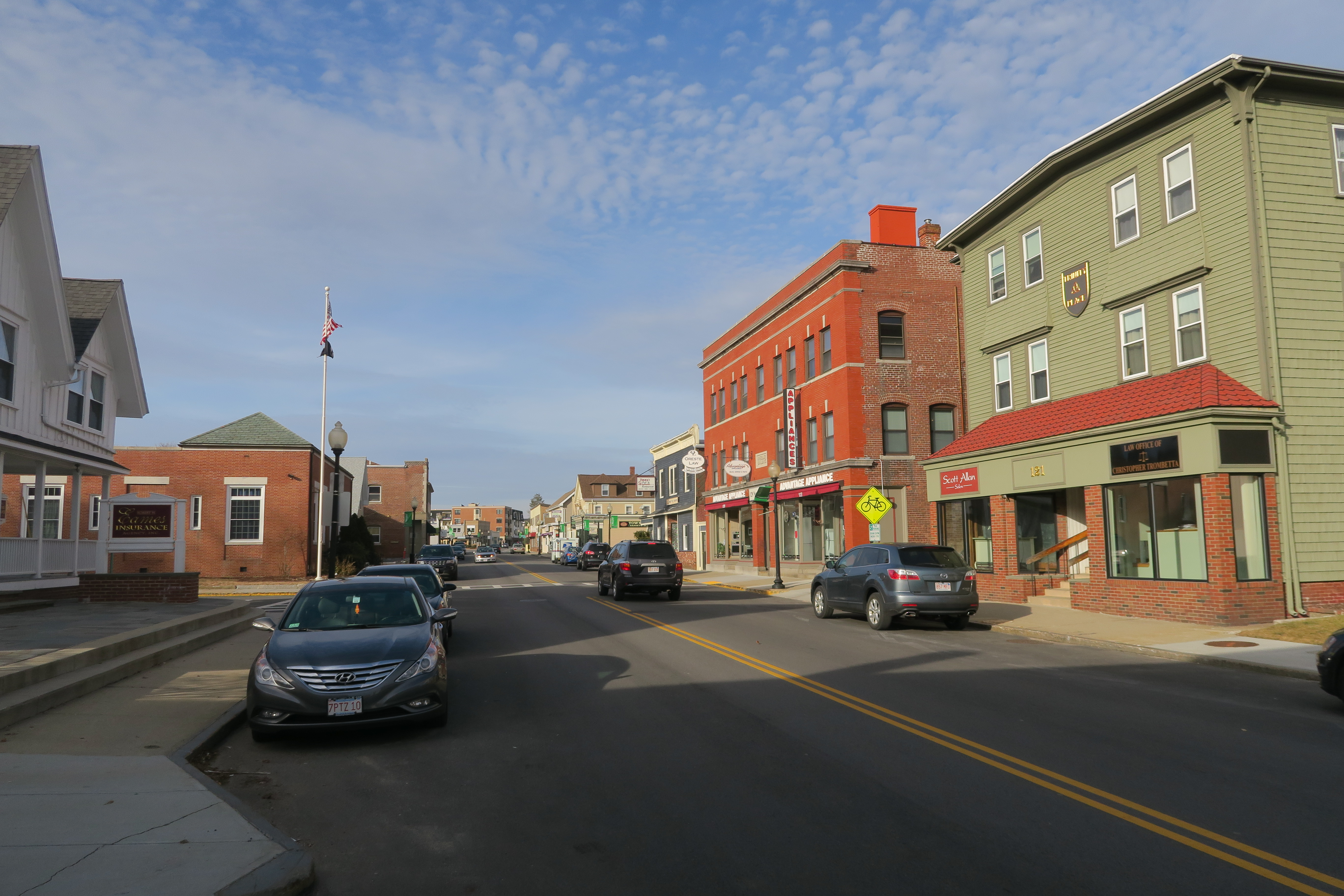
- North Main Street, Mansfield, MA

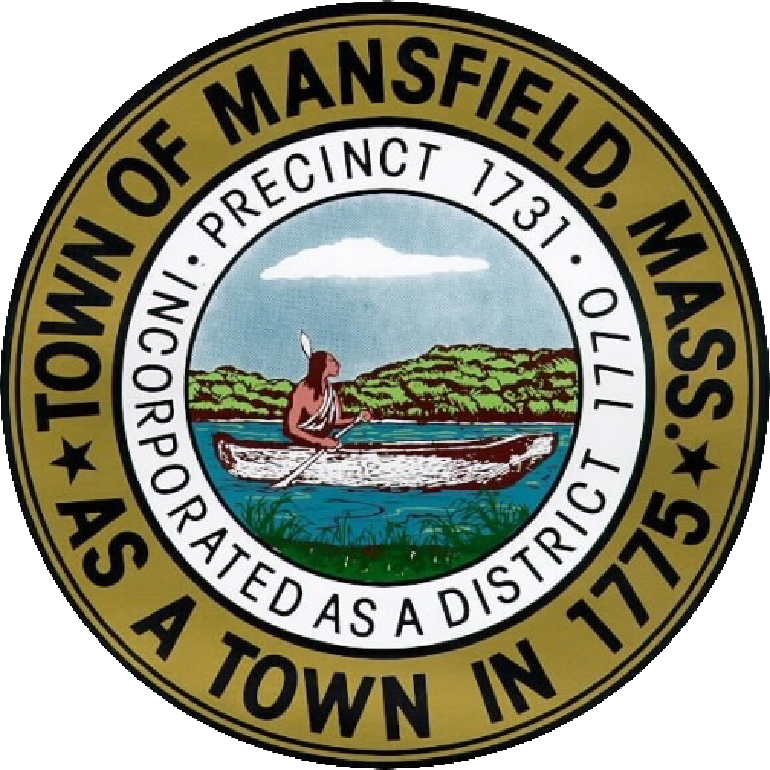
- Seal

- Location in Bristol County in Massachusetts
- Coordinates: 42°02′00″N 71°13′10″W
- Country: United States
- State: Massachusetts
- County: Bristol
- Settled: 1658
- Incorporated: 1775

Government
  - Type: Open town meeting
  - Body: Select Board
  - Town Manager: Mallory Aronstein

Area
  - Total: 20.7 sq mi (53.7 km^{2})
  - Land: 20.5 sq mi (53.0 km^{2})
  - Water: 0.27 sq mi (0.7 km^{2})
- Elevation: 161 ft (49 m)

Population (2020)
  - Total: 23,860
  - Density: 1,166.0/sq mi (450.19/km^{2})
- Time zone: UTC−5 (Eastern)
  - Summer (DST): UTC−4 (Eastern)
- ZIP Code: 02048
- Area code: 508/774
- FIPS code: 25-38225
- GNIS feature ID: 0618283
- Website: www.mansfieldma.com

Mansfield is a town in Bristol County, Massachusetts, United States. As of the United States 2020 Census, the town population is 23,860. Mansfield is 23 miles southwest of Boston and is 22 miles northeast of Providence, Rhode Island. The village of Mansfield Center is located in the town. The town is twinned with Mansfield in Nottinghamshire, England.

== History ==
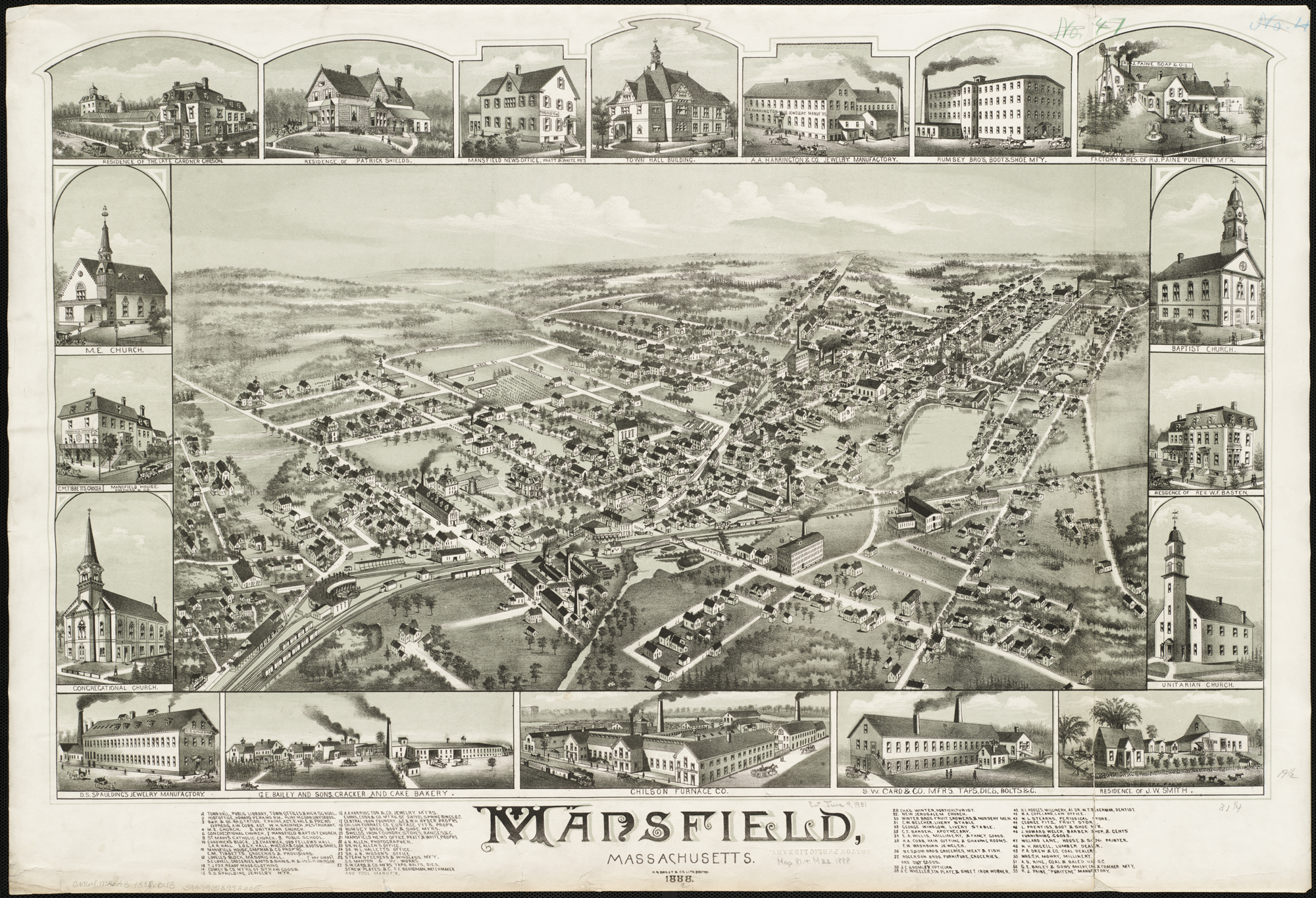
View of Mansfield in 1888

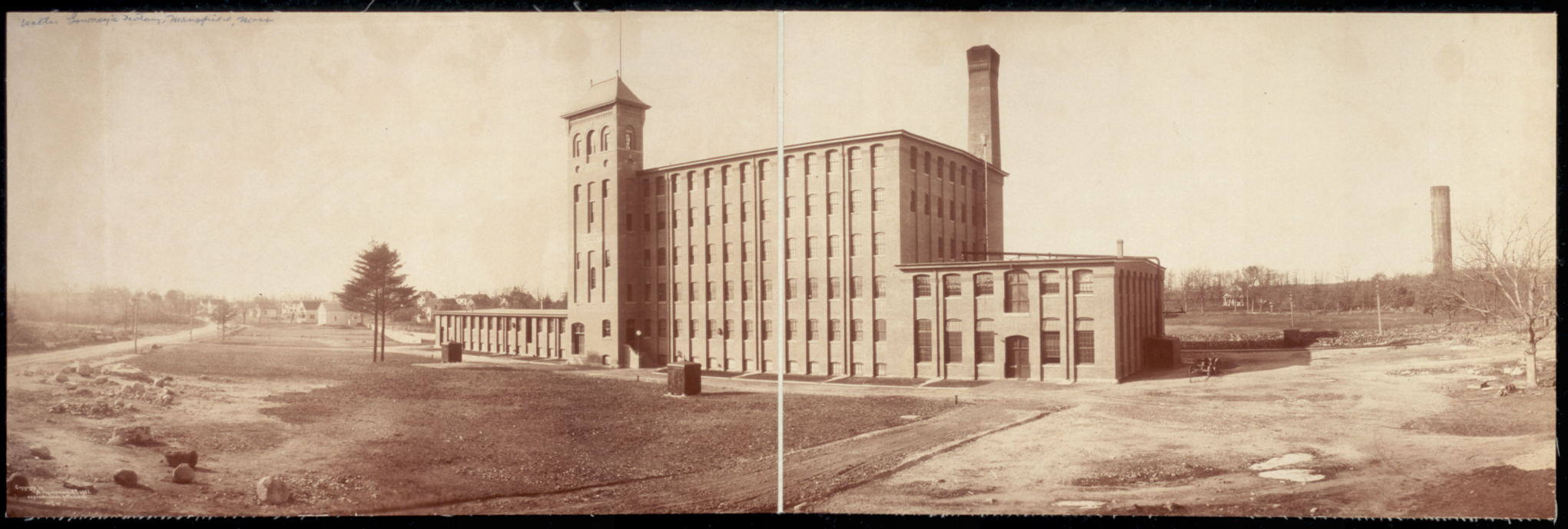
Walter Lowney's chocolate factory, Mansfield

The area to become Mansfield was first scouted in 1640 by Captain Miles Standish, settled in 1658 and was officially incorporated in 1775. It was named for William Murray, 1st Earl of Mansfield, a pro-colonial member of the House of Lords. Mansfield is the home of the Xfinity Center (formerly known as Great Woods, Tweeter Center and Comcast Center) concert venue, one of the most popular in New England.

One of the oldest buildings in Mansfield is the Fisher–Richardson House, built between 1743 and 1751, registered in the National Register of Historic Places. It was restored in 1930 and is a local history museum.

Mansfield is also the birthplace of Honey Dew Donuts, a regional New England chain of donut shops. The first Honey Dew was opened at 221 North Main Street on June 6, 1973.

Benjamin E. Bates, an industrialist and philanthropist, who was the founder of Bates College, was born in Mansfield in 1808. Stove and furnace manufacturer and innovator Gordon Chilson (1804–1877) worked here.

== Geography ==
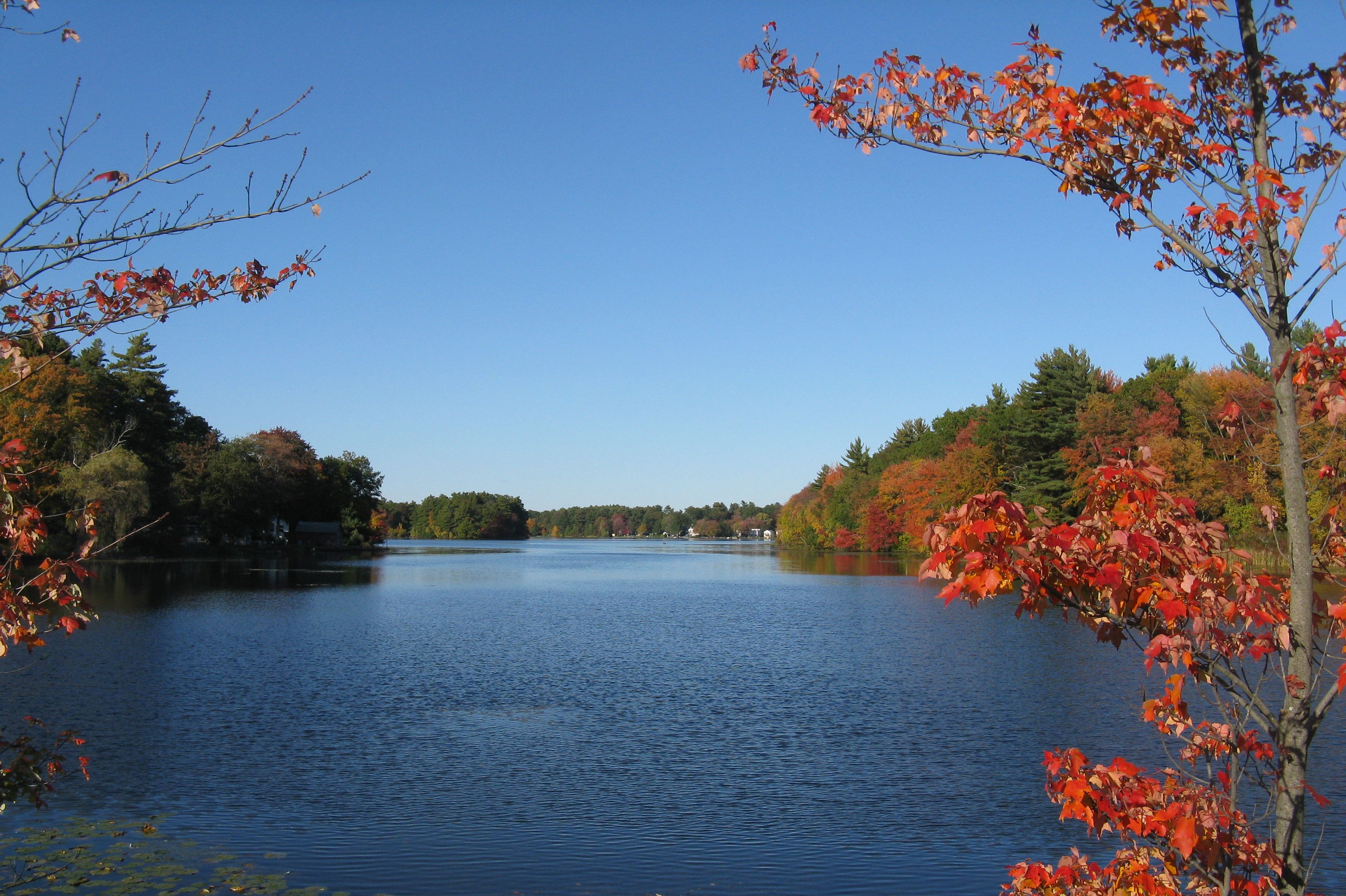
Norton Reservoir within the towns of Mansfield and Norton, looking north

According to the United States Census Bureau, the town has a total area of 20.7 square miles (54 km^{2}), of which 20.5 square miles (53 km^{2}) is land and 0.3 square miles (0.78 km^{2}) (1.25%) is water. There are five conservation areas in the town. They are, from largest to smallest: the Great Woods Conservation Area, Maple Park Conservation Area, York Conservation Area, Marie Strese Conservation Area, and Sweet Pond Conservation Area. The town is bisected by the Canoe, Rumford and Wading Rivers, as well as many small brooks which are all part of the Taunton River Watershed.

Mansfield's location is 28 miles south of Boston, 14 miles west of Brockton, and 19 miles north of Providence, Rhode Island. It is bordered by Foxborough and Sharon to the north, Easton to the east, Norton to the south, and North Attleborough and Attleboro to the west. The town's northern border is also a portion of the northern border of Bristol County. Its neighborhoods include East Mansfield, Whiteville, Ginty Corner, Mansfield Center, Purdy Corner, Robinsonville and West Mansfield.

== Demographics ==
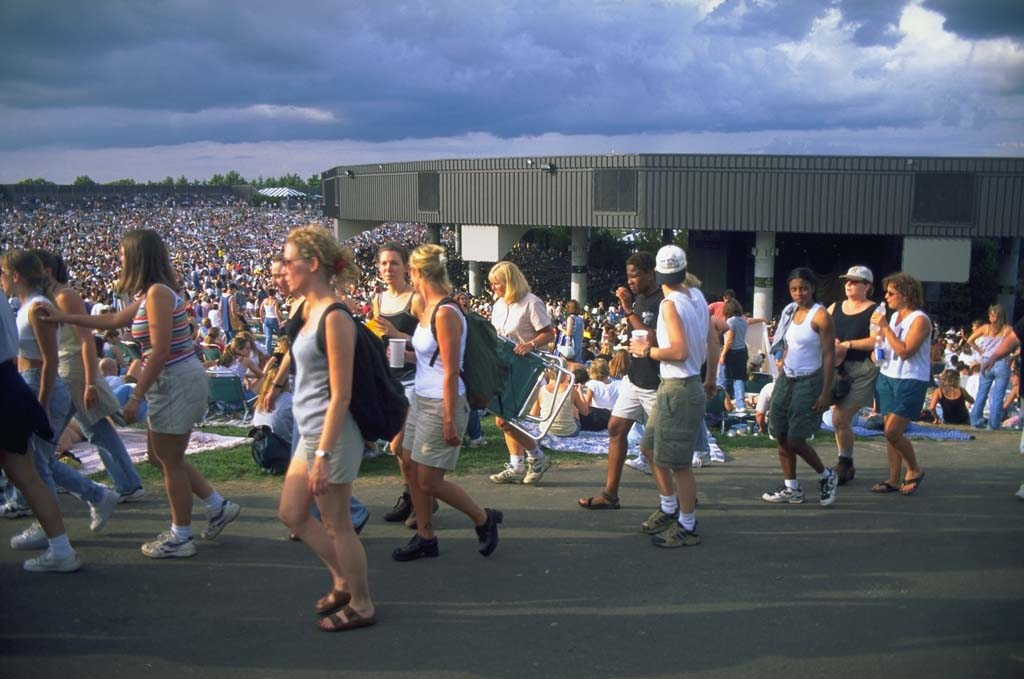
The Xfinity Center is a popular concert venue in the Boston area

Historical population
Year	Pop.	±%
1790	983	—
1850	1,789	+82.0%
1860	2,114	+18.2%
1870	2,432	+15.0%
1880	2,765	+13.7%
1890	3,432	+24.1%
1900	4,006	+16.7%
1910	5,183	+29.4%
1920	6,255	+20.7%
1930	6,364	+1.7%
1940	6,530	+2.6%
1950	7,184	+10.0%
1960	7,773	+8.2%
1970	9,939	+27.9%
1980	13,453	+35.4%
1990	16,568	+23.2%
2000	22,414	+35.3%
2010	23,184	+3.4%
2020	23,860	+2.9%
2024*	24,077	+0.9%
* = population estimate. Source: United States census records and Population Estimates Program data.

As of the census of 2000, there were 22,414 people, 7,942 households, and 5,861 families residing in the town. The population density was 1,095.4 inhabitants per square mile (422.9/km^{2}). There were 8,120 housing units at an average density of 396.8 per square mile (153.2/km^{2}). The racial makeup of the town was 94.30% White, 2.18% African American, 0.21% Native American, 1.93% Asian, 0.02% Pacific Islander, 0.43% from other races, and 0.94% from two or more races. Hispanic or Latino of any race were 1.41% of the population.

There were 7,942 households, out of which 44.7% had children under the age of 18 living with them, 62.2% were married couples living together, 8.9% had a female householder with no husband present, and 26.2% were non-families. Of all households, 21.1% were made up of individuals, and 5.9% had someone living alone who was 65 years of age or older. The average household size was 2.82 and the average family size was 3.34.

In the town, the population was spread out, with 31.4% under the age of 18, 5.3% from 18 to 24, 38.1% from 25 to 44, 18.9% from 45 to 64, and 6.4% who were 65 years of age or older. The median age was 34 years. For every 100 females, there were 99.4 males. For every 100 females age 18 and over, there were 94.8 males.

The median income for a household in the town was $66,925, and the median income for a family was $78,058 (these figures had risen to $93,533 and $111,316 respectively as of a 2007 estimate). Males had a median income of $52,416 versus $36,658 for females. The per capita income for the town was $27,441. About 3.0% of families and 4.5% of the population were below the poverty line, including 3.6% of those under age 18 and 12.9% of those age 65 or over.

== Arts and culture ==
=== Library ===
The Mansfield Public Library was established in 1884. In fiscal year 2008, the town of Mansfield spent 0.86% ($605,929) of its budget on its public library—some $25 per person, per year ($30.62 adjusted for inflation in 2021).

== Government ==
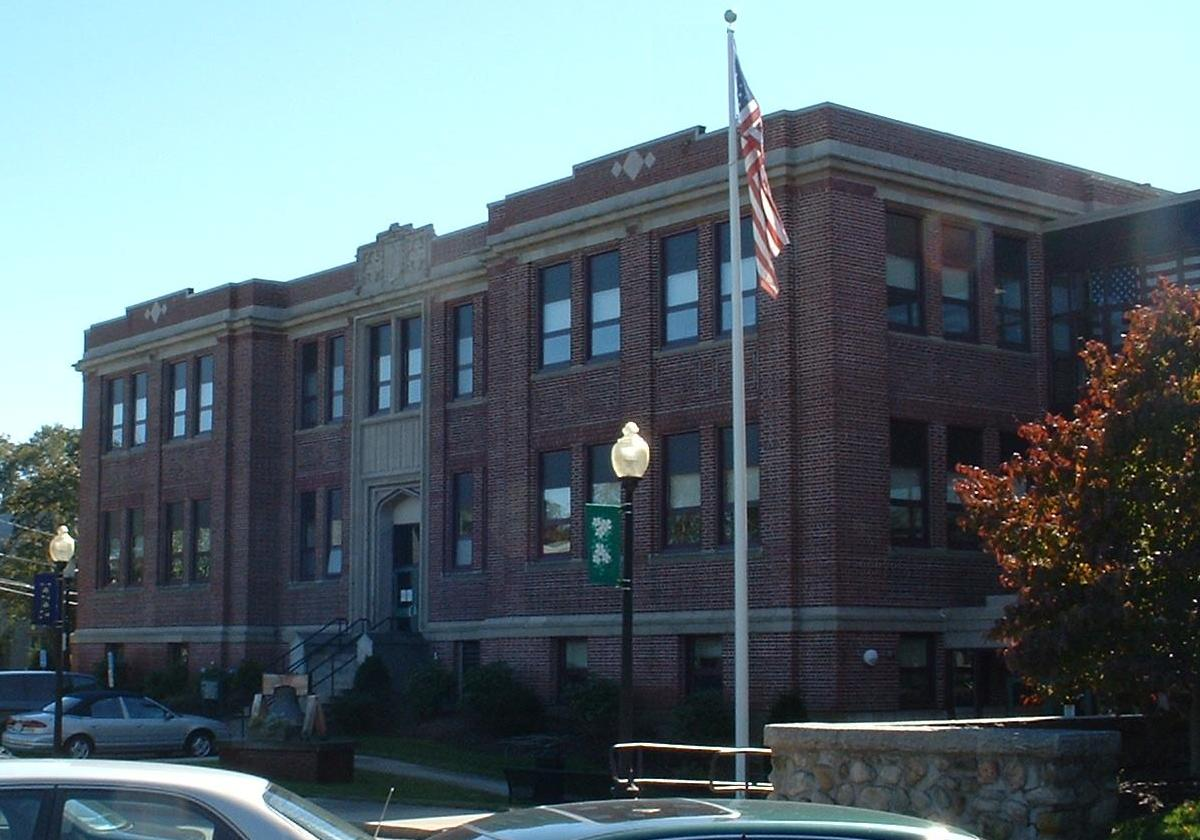
Mansfield Town Hall

The town is governed by an open town meeting, and is managed by a select board and town manager. The Mansfield Public Safety Complex, completed in 2019, houses the police and fire departments and is located in Mansfield Center on Route 106. There is also a secondary fire station located in West Mansfield. The Mansfield Public Library is located at Memorial Park, and the post office is near the intersection of Routes 106 & 140.

On the state level, the town is represented in the State Senate as a portion of the Bristol and Norfolk district (represented by Paul Feeney), including Dover, Foxborough, Mansfield, Medfield, Norton, Rehoboth, Seekonk and Walpole, as well as parts of Attleboro and Sharon. The town is a part of three separate state representative districts, the First and Fourteenth Bristol and Eighth Norfolk districts. The First Bristol district is represented by Republican Michael Chaisson. The Fourteenth Bristol and Eighth Norfolk districts are represented by Democrats Adam Scanlon and Ted Philips, respectively. The town is also patrolled by Troop H (Metro Boston region) of the Massachusetts State Police, 3rd District (Foxborough barracks). On the national level, the town is part of Massachusetts Congressional District 4, which is represented by Jake Auchincloss. The state's senior (Class II) Senator, elected in 2012, is Elizabeth Warren and the state's junior (Class I) Senator, elected in 2013, is Ed Markey.

Mansfield presidential election results
Year	Democratic	Republican	Third parties	Total Votes	Margin
2020	62.08% 9,024	35.42% 5,149	2.50% 364	14,537	26.66%
2016	53.73% 6,879	39.62% 5,073	6.65% 851	12,803	14.11%
2012	49.49% 5,932	48.97% 5,870	1.54% 184	11,986	0.52%
2008	52.77% 6,052	45.13% 5,176	2.10% 241	11,469	7.64%
2004	53.37% 5,775	45.59% 4,933	1.04% 113	10,821	7.78%
2000	53.66% 5,168	39.90% 3,843	6.44% 620	9,631	13.76%
1996	56.36% 4,926	32.55% 2,845	11.10% 970	8,741	23.81%
1992	38.40% 3,356	33.27% 2,908	28.33% 2,476	8,740	5.13%
1988	43.55% 3,243	55.05% 4,099	1.40% 104	7,446	11.50%
1984	36.78% 2,164	62.78% 3,694	0.44% 26	5,884	26.00%
1980	34.47% 1,907	48.45% 2,681	17.08% 945	5,533	13.99%
1976	51.32% 2,780	45.17% 2,447	3.51% 190	5,417	6.15%
1972	47.13% 1,979	52.01% 2,184	0.86% 36	4,199	4.88%
1968	55.16% 2,191	40.79% 1,620	4.05% 161	3,972	14.38%
1964	71.13% 2,723	28.45% 1,089	0.42% 16	3,828	42.69%
1960	49.11% 1,957	50.82% 2,025	0.08% 3	3,985	1.71%
1956	30.24% 1,139	69.60% 2,621	0.16% 6	3,766	39.35%
1952	36.13% 1,431	63.52% 2,516	0.35% 14	3,961	27.39%
1948	42.47% 1,472	55.86% 1,936	1.67% 58	3,466	13.39%
1944	40.60% 1,236	59.13% 1,800	0.26% 8	3,044	18.53%
1940	40.13% 1,265	59.55% 1,877	0.32% 10	3,152	19.42%

== Education ==
The first school record in Mansfield is from 1719, when Thomas Skinner was chosen to be the first schoolmaster. School was taught out of people's homes until the first school building was built in 1793. The school was a small brick building and was in poor condition by 1850. Mansfield's first high school came to be in 1872 under the direction of Rev. A. F. Frost.

Mansfield currently has its own school department, consisting of five schools, governed by a superintendent of schools (whose office is located directly adjacent to the town hall) and a school committee. (Coincidentally, the school department building was once the public library and before that, it was the town hall, and the town hall was once the high school.) There are five schools serving various levels within the town: the Roland Green Preschool, the Everett W. Robinson Elementary School (serving grades K–2), the Jordan-Jackson Elementary School (serving grades 3–5), the Harold L. Qualters Middle School (serving grades 6–8), and Mansfield High School. Mansfield's teams are nicknamed the Hornets, and their colors are green and white. For many years in the 1980s and early 1990s, the school's marching band hosted the first event of the New England Scholastic Band Association's fall field show competition season. Other than the Roland Green Preschool, all the town's schools are located on either side of East Street near the center of town.

In addition to the public schools within the town, Mansfield residents can also send their children to the Foxboro Regional Charter School free of charge. High school students may also attend Southeastern Regional Vocational-Technical High School in Easton or Bristol County Agricultural High School in Dighton free of charge. The town has one parochial school, Saint Mary's Catholic School, which serves grades Pre-K–8, and an Islamic high school, Al-Noor Academy, which opened in 2000 and serves the Islamic community along the I-95 corridor.

Mansfield is also known for its outstanding high school sports and music programs. Football, soccer, baseball, boys' and girls' basketball, lacrosse, track and field (Men), and Women's Indoor and Outdoor Track and Field teams have won multiple league, division, and all-state titles. In 2013 and 2019, the Mansfield Hornets football team won the Division 2 state title, and in 2018, the boys' basketball team won the state Division 1 championship, defeating Hockomock League rival Franklin at the Mass Mutual Center in Springfield. Mansfield High football and girls' basketball coach Michael Redding was inducted into the state football coaches' hall of fame in 2019. The Mansfield music program has also won many awards over the years. The school's percussion ensemble has won many regional championships in the NESBA (New England Scholastic Band Association) circuit and the international championship held by WGI (Winter Guard International) in 2015. The school also has a growing marching band (which competes in NESBA and USBands), concert band, choir, and orchestra.

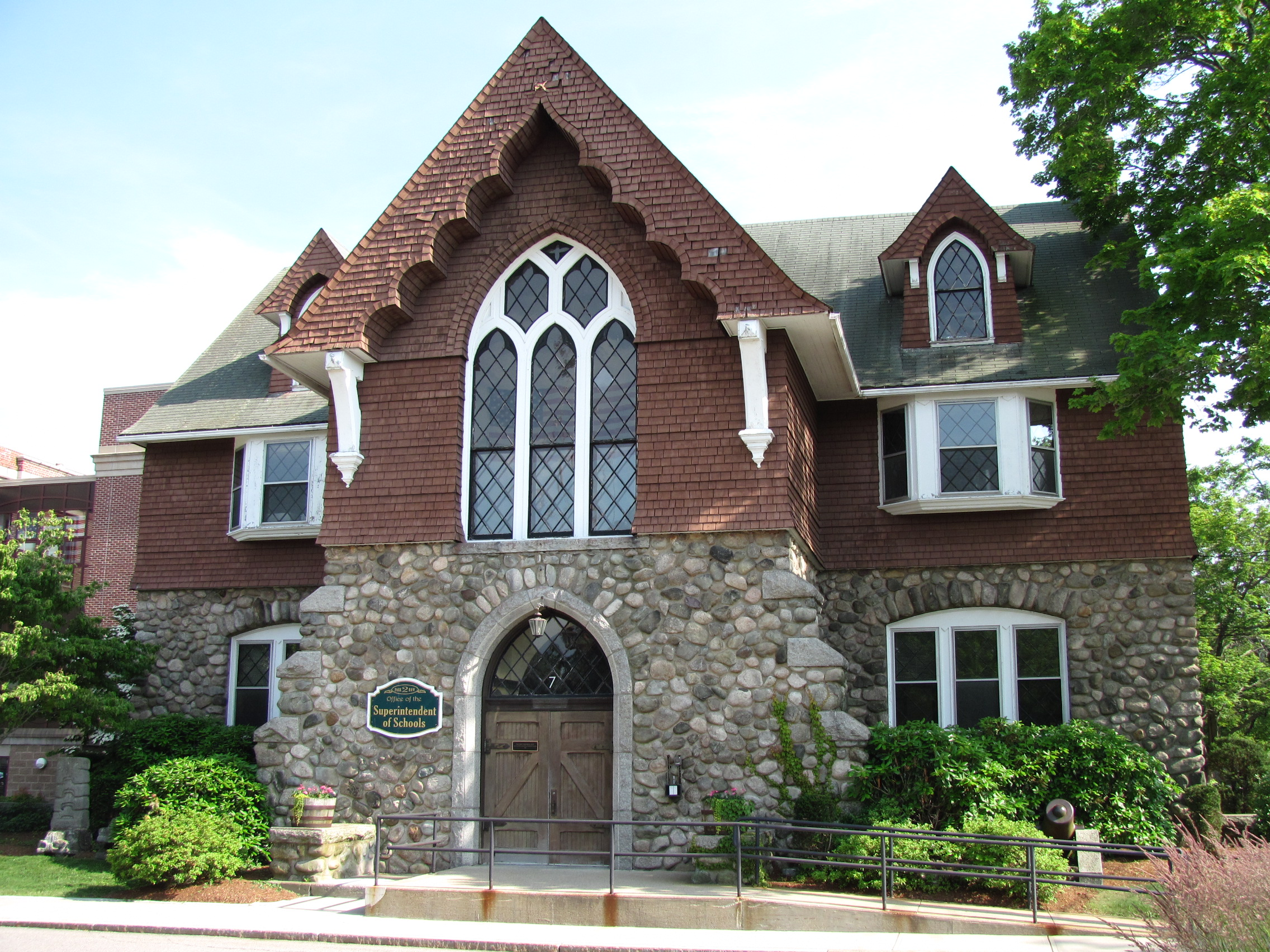
Superintendent of Schools

Mansfield High School

== Infrastructure ==
=== Transportation ===
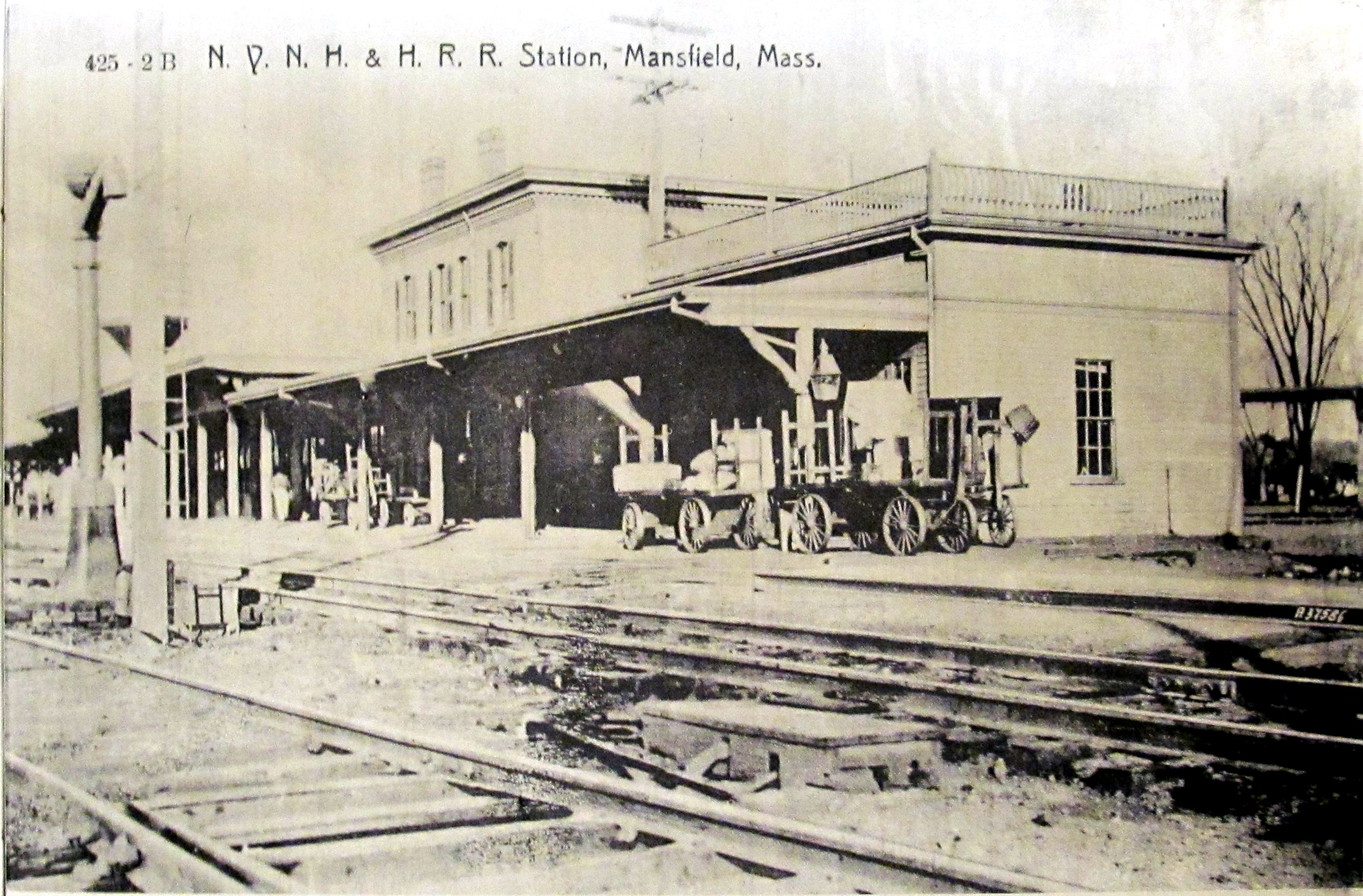
A 1908 view of the Mansfield station

One of the intersections of Interstates 95 and 495 is located on the Mansfield-Foxborough town line, with both highways going through the town. Additionally, the town includes open and limited-access sections of Route 140, as well as part of Route 106. The only exits off the interstates which are located within the town are I-495 Exit 31 (linking to a limited access section of Rt. 140 North from both directions of I-495) and I-95 Exit 13 (linking to Rt. 140 North / South and South Main Street). The town also has a stop along the MBTA's commuter line between Providence and Boston, and is serviced by Mansfield Municipal Airport, which serves smaller aircraft. Mansfield is effectively equidistant between two international airports, with parts of the town being closer to either Logan International Airport in Boston or T.F. Green Airport in Warwick, Rhode Island, each of which is approximately 30 to 35 miles from the town.

Mansfield Municipal Airport is a public airport located 2 mi (1.7 nmi; 3.2 km) southeast of the central business district of Mansfield.

== Notable people ==
- Benjamin Bates IV (born 1808), American industrialist
- Don Currivan (born 1920), Football Player
- Tom Gilson (born 1988), Arena Football League player
- Shawnae Jebbia (born 1971), Miss Massachusetts USA 1998 and Miss USA 1998
- Frank Jerome Murray (born 1904), US federal judge
- Jen Royle (born 1974), former reporter turned chef
- Laban Wheaton (born 1846), US Representative from Massachusetts
