= Groveland, Massachusetts =

- Town
- Town of Groveland
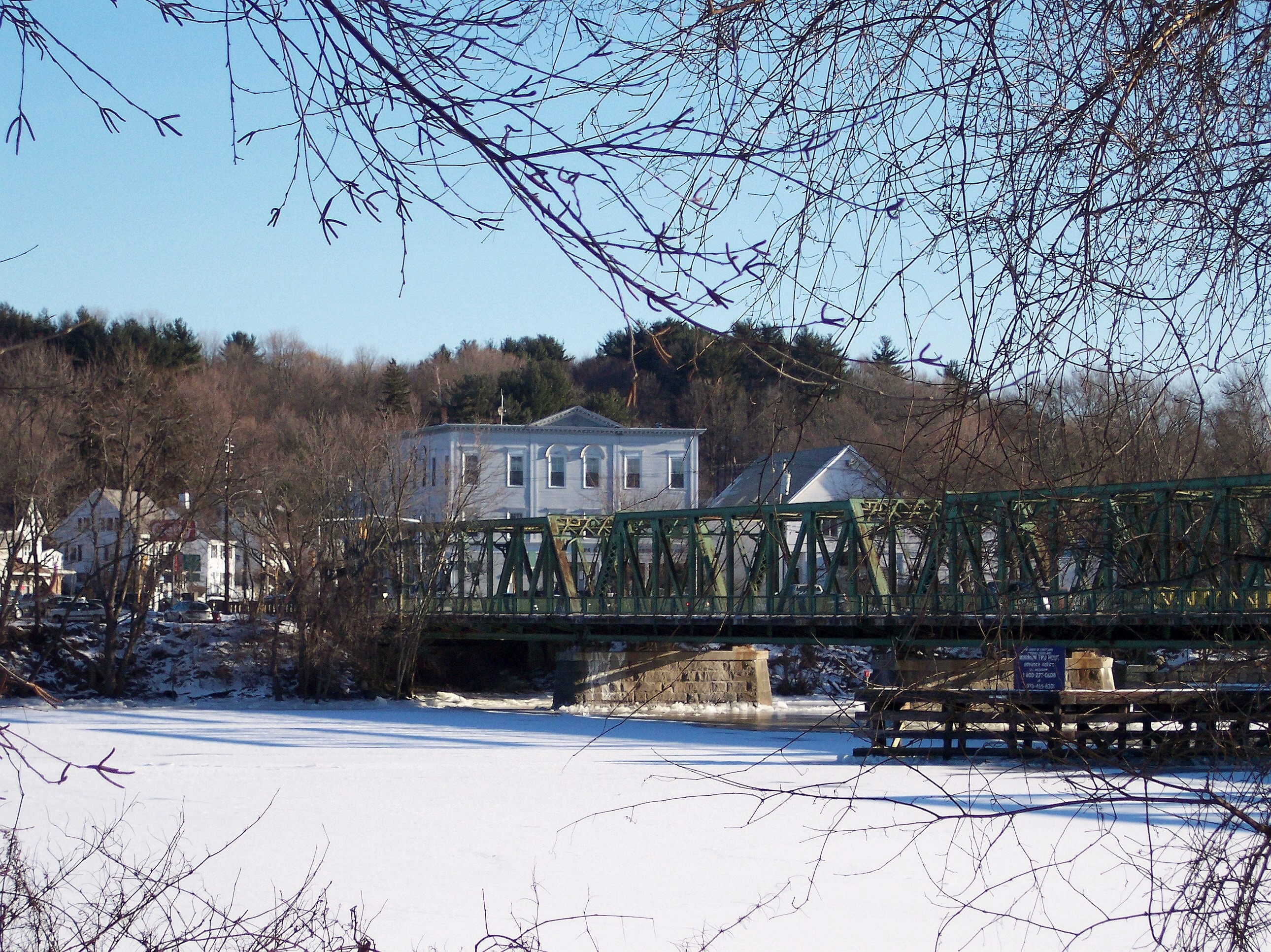
- Old Bates Bridge on the Merrimack River in 2006

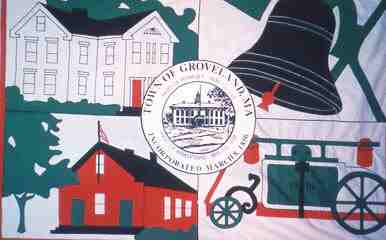
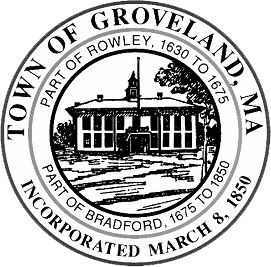
- Flag Seal

- Location in Essex County and Massachusetts.
- Coordinates: 42°45′37″N 71°01′55″W
- Country: United States
- State: Massachusetts
- County: Essex
- Settled: 1639
- Incorporated: 1850

Government
  - Type: Open town meeting
  - Town Manager: Rebecca Oldham

Area
  - Total: 9.4 sq mi (24.4 km^{2})
  - Land: 9.0 sq mi (23.2 km^{2})
  - Water: 0.46 sq mi (1.2 km^{2})
- Elevation: 49 ft (15 m)

Population (2020)
  - Total: 6,752
  - Density: 754/sq mi (291/km^{2})
- Time zone: UTC-5 (Eastern)
  - Summer (DST): UTC-4 (Eastern)
- ZIP code: 01834
- Area code: 351 / 978
- FIPS code: 25-27620
- GNIS feature ID: 0618298
- Website: www.grovelandma.com

Groveland is a town in Essex County, Massachusetts, United States. It is thirty-four miles north of Boston. At the 2020 census, it had a population of 6,752. The town is divided into two precincts, Groveland and South Groveland.

== History ==
Before incorporating as a town, Groveland was previously the East Parish of Bradford, which was originally part of the town of Rowley. Before Bradford was separated from Rowley in 1672, it was called "Rowley on the Merrimack", or just "Merrimack". Bradford in turn was annexed by Haverhill in 1897. Groveland officially incorporated as a separate town on September 9, 1850. Groveland residents celebrate the anniversary of this date as Groveland Day.

In December 1638, after seventeen years of service, the Reverend Ezekiel Rogers was discharged from his post as rector of the parish of Rowley in Yorkshire, England. He had refused to read "that accursed book allowing sports on the Lord's Day." Believing the future of Puritanism was at stake, he and the members of twenty families sailed for the New World. Within these families were people of means and learning, including farmers, weavers, carpenters, and smiths. They landed at Salem, Massachusetts, but did not attempt to make a settlement until the following spring. The first printing press brought to America was on board that same ship, the "John of London".

Since there were no plantations left along the coastline, Reverend Rogers settled a tract of land between Ipswich and Newbury, where a land boom had developed. These two towns had already established grants on this tract, so the newcomers were required to purchase them for £800. Reverend Rogers's settlement was established in modern-day Rowley. Named Roger's Plantation and later Rowley after the English town, the initial settlement comprised sixty families. In September 1639, the town incorporated, and included the territory now occupied by Rowley, Georgetown, Groveland, Boxford, and the Bradford village portion of Haverhill.

The Congregational church in Groveland has a bell crafted by Paul Revere. Of the 900 bells made by Revere's company, this is one of two remaining bells in active service (the other is in Lowell, Massachusetts). In town hall, the oldest hand-pump fire-engine in the country is on display. Built in 1798 and originally named Torrent of Roxbury, Massachusetts, the hand pumper was moved to Bradford in 1828 and renamed Engine 2. In 1850, the same year East Bradford became Groveland, the pumper was renamed Veto, and is now on display in Groveland's town hall.

=== Downtown Groveland ===
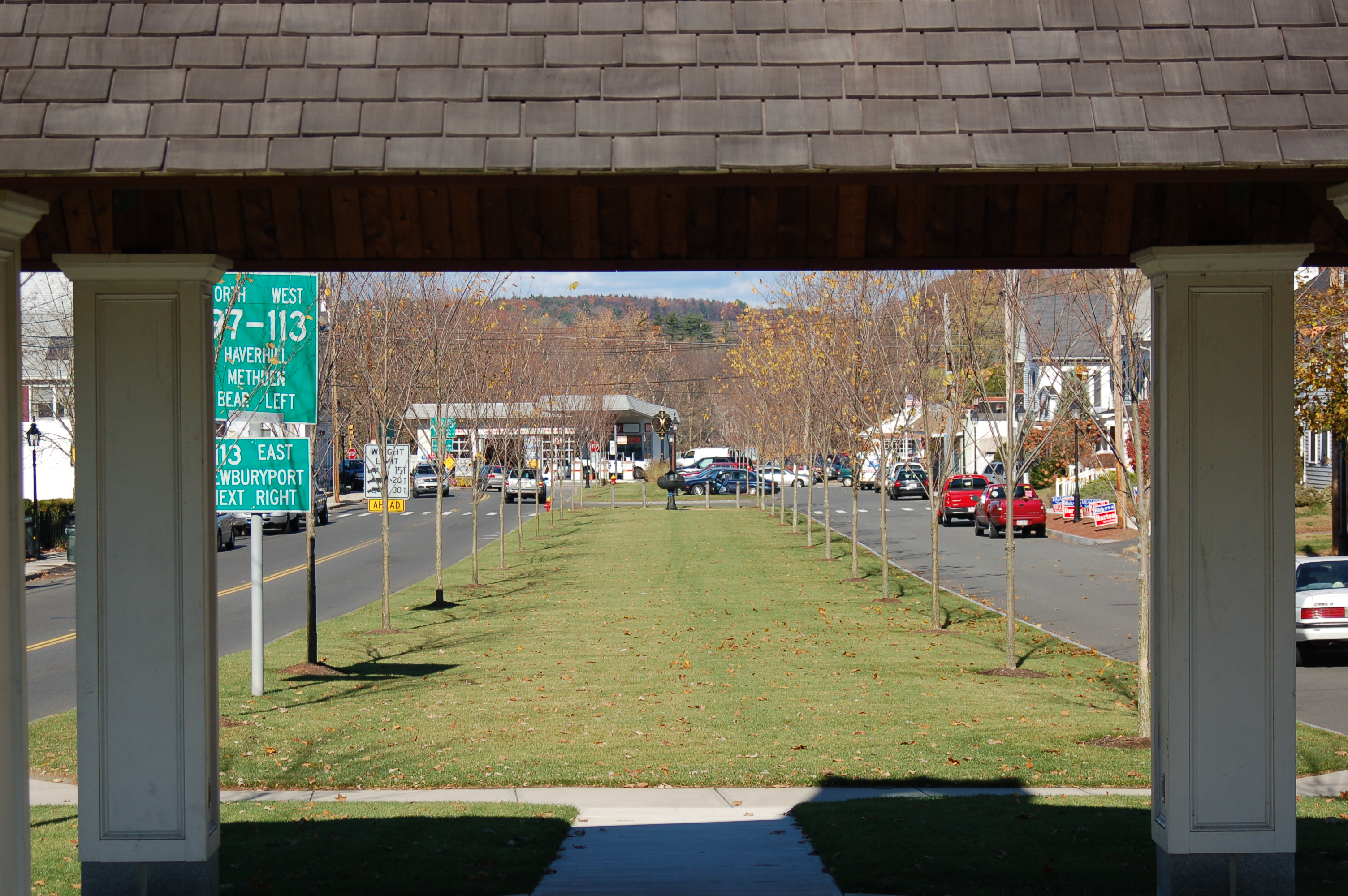
Downtown from Elm Park

Groveland's downtown is framed by the gazebo in Elm Park. Elm Park is a recent addition to Groveland. In the early part of the last century, elm trees were dominant in the landscape. Then, about 1950, many of the trees died of Dutch elm disease. It is only recently that resistant varieties of elms have been developed. With this development, the townspeople built a new park, planted with the new resistant variety. Since Groveland is primarily a bedroom community, there is considerable traffic during the commute drive time. However, once the rush is over, the town reverts to a sleepy village, with children and some grownups riding their bicycles about and walking.

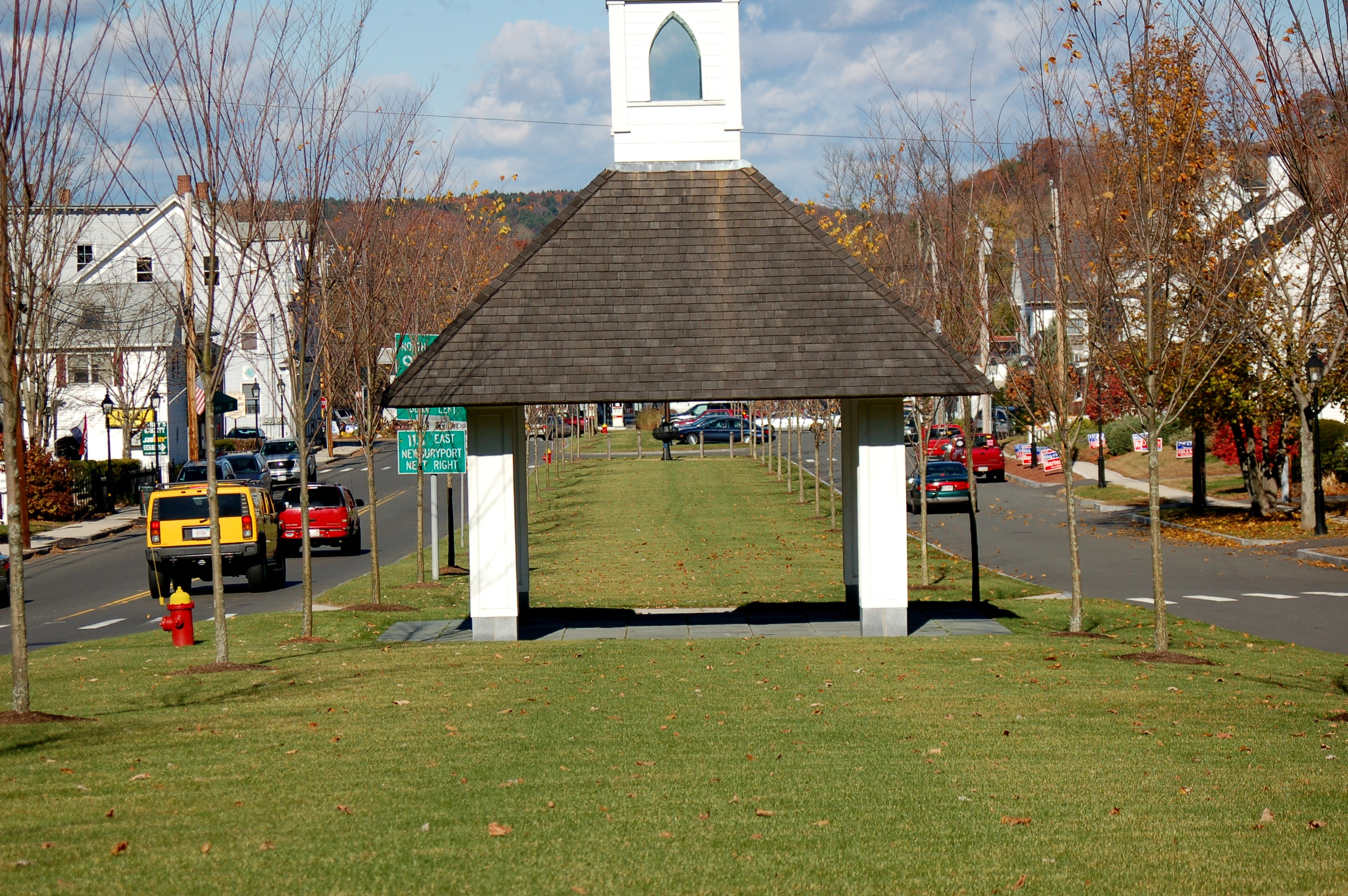
Elm Park

Named Constitution Park when first created in 1832, it was only in 1857 that the elm trees arrived and with it the park's new name. Elm Park was the first planned housing development in the area. House lots were laid out around the common and the owners of which given rights to the well at the south end of the common. By the 1950s, Dutch elm disease had ravaged most of the trees. In the early 1960s, the last tree was taken down and the park's fountain dismantled. Thirty years later, thanks to the perseverance of Groveland residents and town officials, the town received the first of several state grants to restore Elm Park. With assistance from the Department of Environmental Management, the Historic Commission and others, Groveland has succeeded in restoring Elm Park to its historic charm.

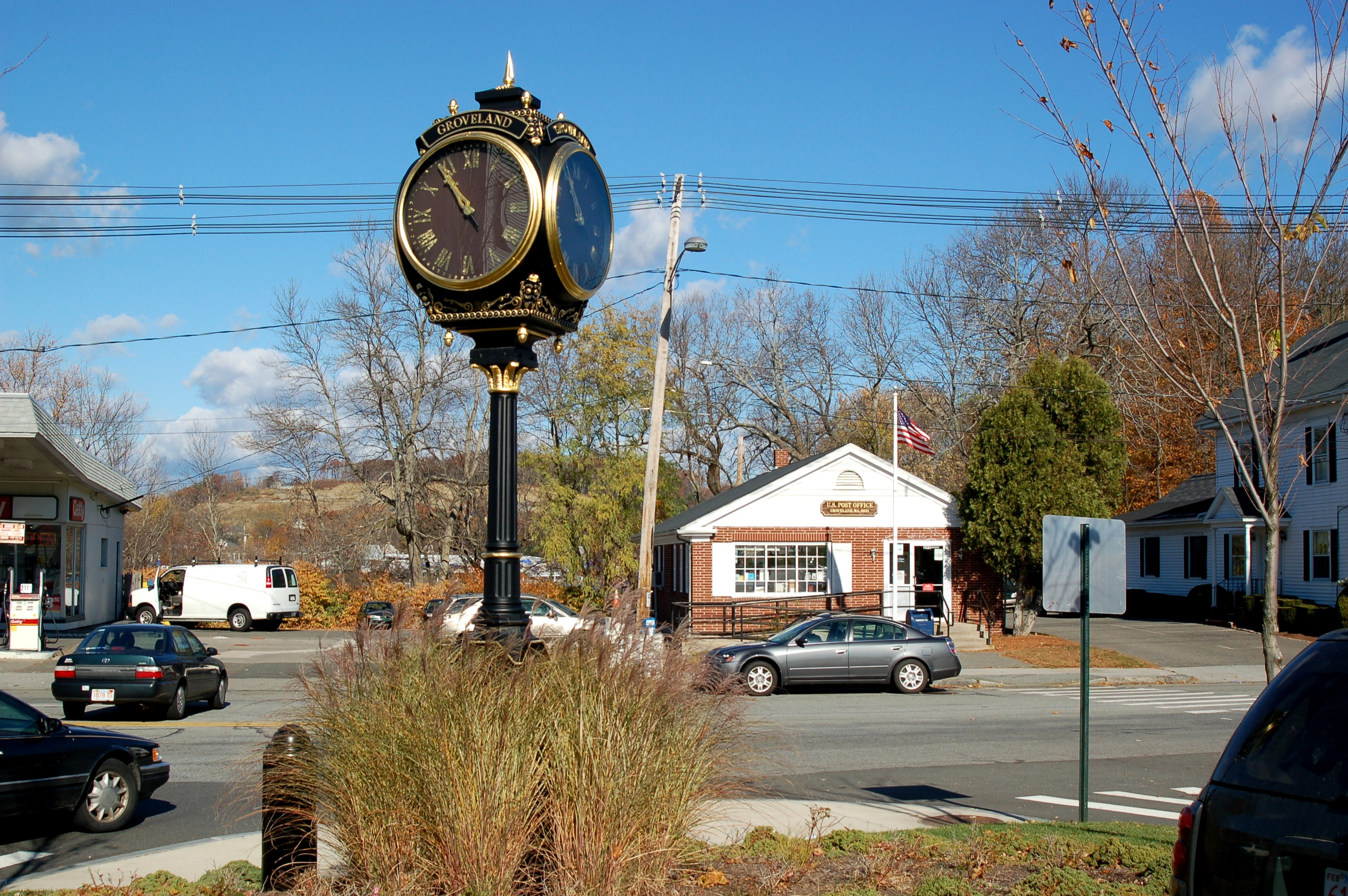
Post office

Today visitors can walk along new sidewalks lit at night by new versions of the park's original lampposts. A new fountain resembling the original, a gazebo much like the old Methodist meeting house that sat at the south end of the park, and a new clock adorn the grounds. A large stone sign and monuments to local veterans depict some of the park and town's history. The new elm trees are planted in roughly the same pattern as the originals.

The first town post office was established in 1810 in Bradford, and was located in Squire Greenough's store on Main Street. Mr. Greenough was the postmaster until 1825, when he was succeeded by Capt. Benjamin Parker, who relocated the post office, at first, to his own store, and then to the blacksmith shop near the Haverhill Bridge. Later that same year, the building itself was moved to the other side of the street, where it remained for many years. After the town of Groveland was established in 1850, a new post office was built approximately half a mile from the present location on Main Street.

== Geography and transportation ==
According to the United States Census Bureau, the town has a total area of 9.4 square miles (24 km^{2}), of which 8.9 square miles (23 km^{2}) is land and 0.5 square miles (1.3 km^{2}), or 4.99%, is water. The town lies along the south banks of the Merrimack River, and several other brooks, as well as the Parker River, pass through the town. There are two ponds, Crane Pond in the eastern end of town, and Johnson's Pond, on the Boxford town line. Along with a town forest, much of the eastern corner of town is taken up by the Crane Pond Wildlife Management Area.

Groveland is located in the northwestern part of Essex County, and is bordered by Haverhill to the west and northwest, West Newbury to the northeast, a small portion of Newbury to the east, Georgetown to the southeast, and Boxford to the southwest. Groveland's town center is located 9 miles (14 km) northeast of Lawrence and 10 miles (16 km) southwest of Newburyport.

There are no interstates passing through Groveland, but downtown is 7 miles or less to five interchanges of Interstate 95 and 9 miles or less to five interchanges of Interstate 495. The concurrency of Route 97 and Route 113 enters the town over the Bates Bridge from Haverhill. The bridge was opened in 2013, replacing a 1913 bridge that was immediately upriver of the new bridge; the 1913 bridge itself replaced its predecessor which crossed the river where School Street terminates at Main Street. From the end of the bridge, Route 97 heads south through the town to Georgetown, while Route 113 bears eastward along the river towards West Newbury. The bridge project cost $49.7M.

The Merrimack Valley Regional Transit Authority operates bus routes through town. The Haverhill/Reading Line of the MBTA Commuter Rail terminates in neighboring Haverhill, providing rail service into Boston's North Station. The nearest small-craft airport is Lawrence Municipal Airport in North Andover, and the nearest national air service can be found at Logan International Airport. There is a Peter Pan bus that goes to North Station that picks up/drops off at The Tea Garden, the Chinese food restaurant and bar in town.

=== Climate ===
Climate data for Groveland, Massachusetts (Aug. 1992–2020 normals, extremes 1992–present)
Month	Jan	Feb	Mar	Apr	May	Jun	Jul	Aug	Sep	Oct	Nov	Dec	Year
Record high °F (°C)	72 (22)	74 (23)	89 (32)	93 (34)	95 (35)	100 (38)	100 (38)	99 (37)	94 (34)	84 (29)	80 (27)	76 (24)	100 (38)
Mean maximum °F (°C)	58.1 (14.5)	57.9 (14.4)	67.0 (19.4)	80.2 (26.8)	89.7 (32.1)	91.6 (33.1)	93.9 (34.4)	92.3 (33.5)	88.7 (31.5)	78.5 (25.8)	69.9 (21.1)	61.0 (16.1)	95.8 (35.4)
Mean daily maximum °F (°C)	35.3 (1.8)	38.1 (3.4)	45.7 (7.6)	58.1 (14.5)	68.9 (20.5)	77.6 (25.3)	83.1 (28.4)	81.3 (27.4)	73.4 (23.0)	61.7 (16.5)	50.6 (10.3)	40.6 (4.8)	59.5 (15.3)
Daily mean °F (°C)	26.3 (−3.2)	28.5 (−1.9)	35.8 (2.1)	47.0 (8.3)	57.4 (14.1)	66.6 (19.2)	72.3 (22.4)	70.5 (21.4)	62.8 (17.1)	51.1 (10.6)	41.0 (5.0)	31.8 (−0.1)	49.3 (9.6)
Mean daily minimum °F (°C)	17.3 (−8.2)	18.8 (−7.3)	26.0 (−3.3)	35.9 (2.2)	45.8 (7.7)	55.6 (13.1)	61.6 (16.4)	59.7 (15.4)	52.1 (11.2)	40.5 (4.7)	31.5 (−0.3)	23.1 (−4.9)	39.0 (3.9)
Mean minimum °F (°C)	−4.3 (−20.2)	−1.1 (−18.4)	6.2 (−14.3)	21.1 (−6.1)	30.8 (−0.7)	41.4 (5.2)	49.8 (9.9)	46.1 (7.8)	34.3 (1.3)	24.1 (−4.4)	16.0 (−8.9)	4.3 (−15.4)	−6.9 (−21.6)
Record low °F (°C)	−22 (−30)	−16 (−27)	−8 (−22)	10 (−12)	26 (−3)	36 (2)	45 (7)	41 (5)	29 (−2)	14 (−10)	6 (−14)	−8 (−22)	−22 (−30)
Average precipitation inches (mm)	3.70 (94)	3.61 (92)	4.95 (126)	4.16 (106)	3.83 (97)	4.20 (107)	3.56 (90)	3.37 (86)	4.08 (104)	4.92 (125)	3.88 (99)	4.72 (120)	48.98 (1,246)
Average snowfall inches (cm)	17.9 (45)	17.2 (44)	14.4 (37)	2.4 (6.1)	0.0 (0.0)	0.0 (0.0)	0.0 (0.0)	0.0 (0.0)	0.0 (0.0)	0.4 (1.0)	1.8 (4.6)	13.0 (33)	67.1 (170.7)
Average extreme snow depth inches (cm)	11.7 (30)	15.9 (40)	11.7 (30)	1.5 (3.8)	0.0 (0.0)	0.0 (0.0)	0.0 (0.0)	0.0 (0.0)	0.0 (0.0)	0.5 (1.3)	0.5 (1.3)	8.7 (22)	20.8 (53)
Average precipitation days (≥ 0.01 in)	12.0	10.6	11.5	10.9	12.5	11.6	9.5	9.2	9.0	11.0	10.6	11.7	130.1
Average snowy days (≥ 0.1 in)	8.0	7.2	5.4	1.3	0.0	0.0	0.0	0.0	0.0	0.3	1.3	5.3	28.8
Source 1: NOAA
Source 2: National Weather Service (mean maxima/minima, snow depth 2006–2020)

== Demographics ==
Historical population
Year	Pop.	±%
1850	1,286	—
1860	1,448	+12.6%
1870	1,776	+22.7%
1880	2,227	+25.4%
1890	2,191	−1.6%
1900	2,376	+8.4%
1910	2,253	−5.2%
1920	2,650	+17.6%
1930	2,336	−11.8%
1940	2,122	−9.2%
1950	2,340	+10.3%
1960	3,297	+40.9%
1970	5,382	+63.2%
1980	5,040	−6.4%
1990	5,214	+3.5%
2000	6,038	+15.8%
2010	6,459	+7.0%
2020	6,752	+4.5%
2022	6,721	−0.5%
Source: United States census records and Population Estimates Program data.

As of the census of 2020, there were 6752 people, 2672 (+/-212) households, and 1898 (+/-167) residing in the town. The population density was 758.7 inhabitants per square mile (292.9/km^{2}) of land. There were 2,672 housing units at an average density of 263.6 per square mile (101.8/km^{2}) of land. The racial makeup of the town was 97.00% White, 0.16% African American, 0.00% Native American, 0.32% Asian, 0.56% from other races, and 1.94% from two or more races. Hispanic or Latino of any race was 1.84% of the population.

There were 2672 households, of which 31.8% had children under the age of 18 living with them, 61.6% were married couples living together, 8.3% had a female householder with no husband present, and 29.0% were non-families. 21.3% of all households were made up of individuals, and 10.4% had someone living alone who was 65 years of age or older. The average household size was 2.53 and the average family size was 3.02.

In the town, the age groups wer spread out, with 21.6% under the age of 18, 5.2% from 18 to 24, 18.6% from 25 to 44, 25.6% from 45 to 64, and 20.6% who were 65 years of age or older. The median age was 42.6 years. For every 100 females, there were 91.9 males. For every 100 females age 18 and over, there were 82.8 males.

The median income for a household in the town in 2010 was $79,521, and the median income for a family was $95,451. Males had a median income of $61,750 versus $54,023 for females. The per capita income for the town was $34,254; about 3.6% of families and 4.0% of the population were below the poverty line, including 8.2% of those under age 18 and 2.6% of those age 65 or over.

== Government ==
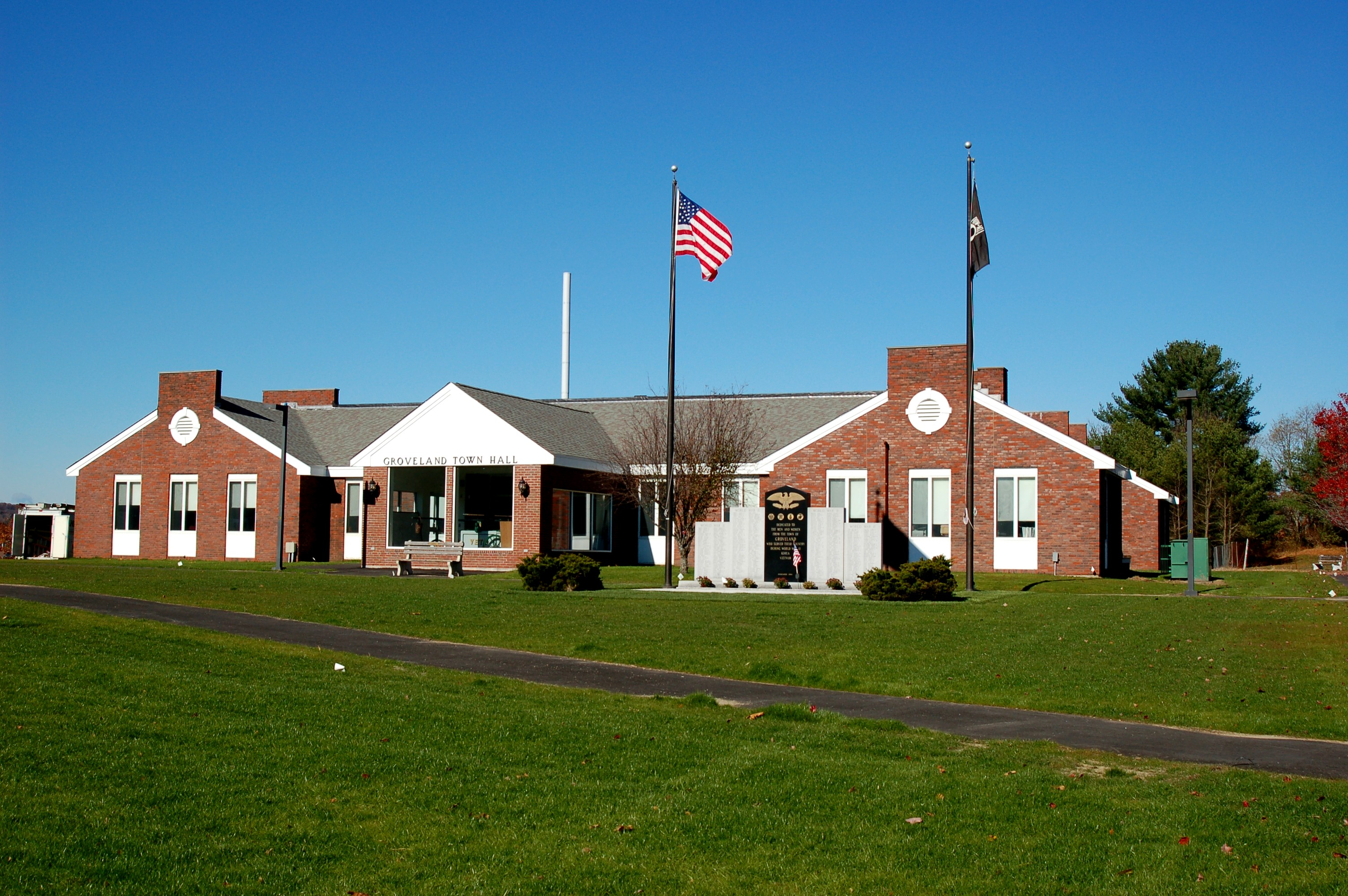
Groveland Town Hall

Groveland has an open-town meeting form of government. The Select Board comprises five members, who are elected for three-year terms, in the annual town election. The Select Board is vested with all the municipal authority not specifically retained by the town's legislative body, town meeting, or other elected boards. The Selectmen are responsible for all facets of governmental duties. The warrants for the annual and special town meetings are generated from their office, as are any warrants for any elections or override votes scheduled. A Town Administrator appointed by the Select Board is the Chief Operating Officer of the town and serves as the agent of the Select Board in the daily administration of the town The Select Board work with the Town Administrator, the Town Accountant, and Finance Board members to establish the annual operating budget for the town. Every July 1 the Select Board appoints residents to various official boards and commissions, approve the hiring of all employees, hold public hearings on important town issues, and enforce town by-laws and regulations. The Select Board meets bi-weekly on Monday evenings, unless otherwise posted, at 6:30 pm in the main meeting room of Town Hall. Most all of the meetings on important town issues in which the public are expected to participate are held after normal "working hours." This allows the working public to participate fully in the government of the town.

=== Groveland Town Hall ===
The town's administrative complex is located on Main Street, and contains the town hall, police and fire stations, and the Langley-Adams Library. Located at 183 Main Street, the Groveland Town Hall contains most of Groveland's municipal offices. The large windows in front expose a showroom containing historic artifacts, including the famous "VETO No. 2" fire pumper, Groveland's first fire apparatus.

=== Groveland Police Department ===
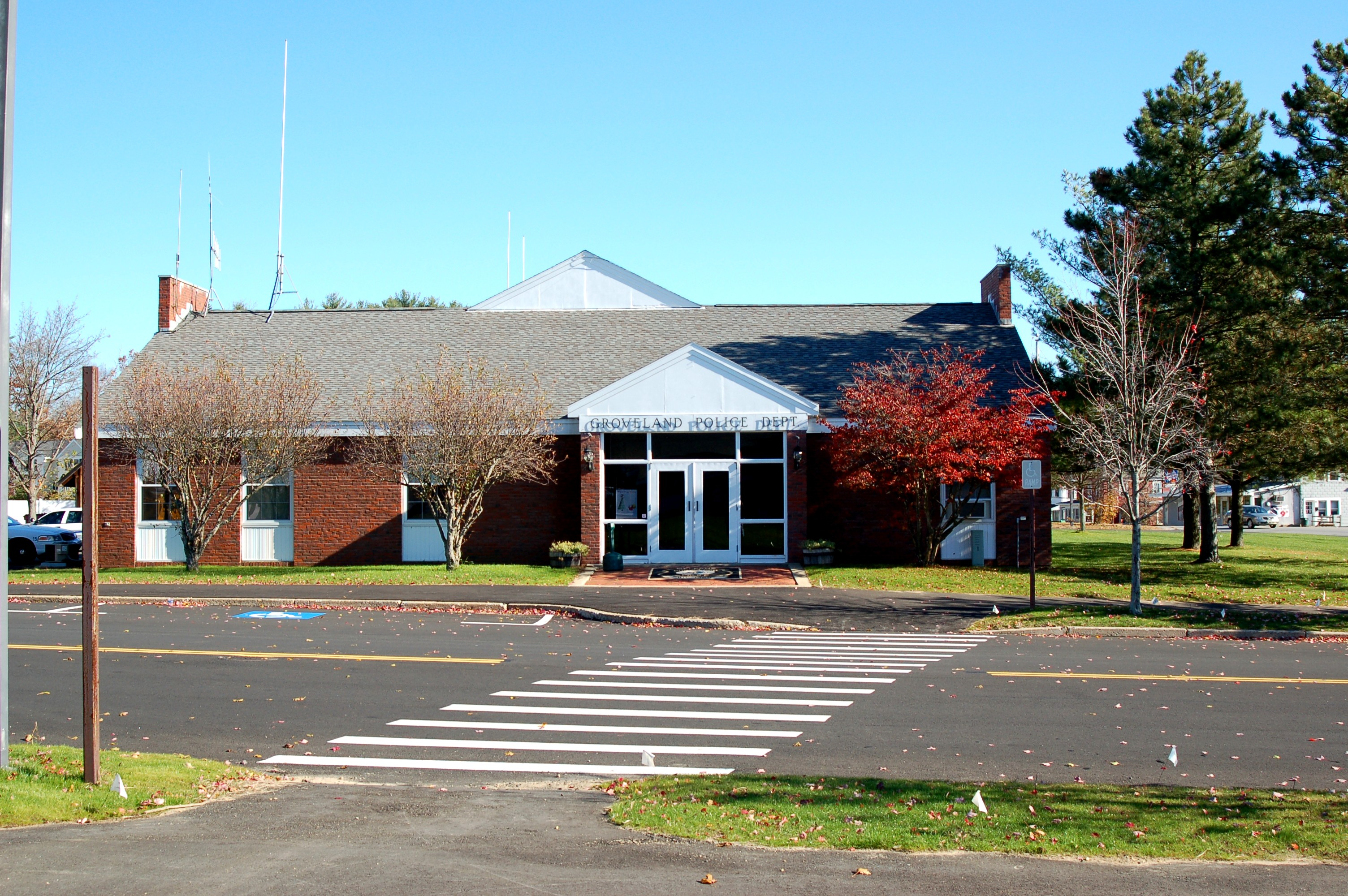
Groveland Police Department

Because of the low crime rate, there is not a lot of visible activity here. However, the police are on duty 24/7 and a dispatcher is always on site. This facility also contains a jail for temporary holding of suspects.

=== Groveland Fire Department ===
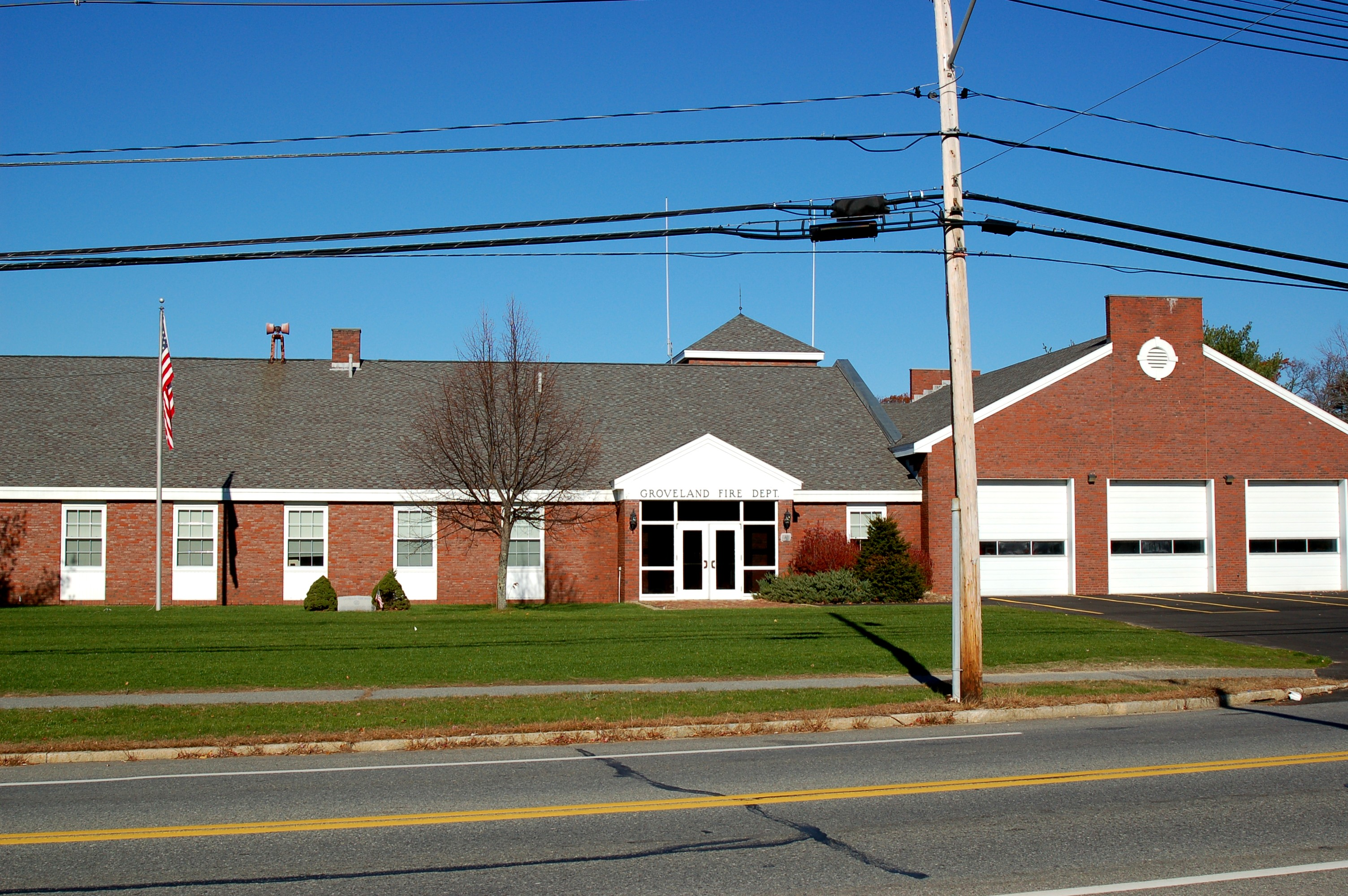
Groveland Fire Department

The Fire Department consists of 40 firefighters all of which serve on a paid call basis. There are two stations from which the firefighters are dispatched, Central Station (as seen in the picture on the left) and South Station. The workforce is divided equally between the two stations, with 20 firefighters in Central Station and 20 in South Station. The Fire Department serves the town in all areas of fire suppression including residential, commercial, and woodland properties. Currently the GFD has 8 in service apparatuses. In Central Station there is the Ladder Truck, Engine 1(pumper) Squad 1 and Tanker 1. In South Station you can find Squad 2, Engine 2 (Tanker/Pumper), Engine 3 (pumper) and Combo 2 (forestry truck). It is also responsible for conducting water and ice rescue in addition to providing numerous emergency medical service calls. Fire personnel undergo rigorous and diversified training on an ongoing basis in order to develop the skills necessary to provide the services needed in a rapidly growing community. The department's equipment and manpower is designed to be flexible, efficient, effective, and tailored to addressing the specific community needs.

=== Langley-Adams Library ===
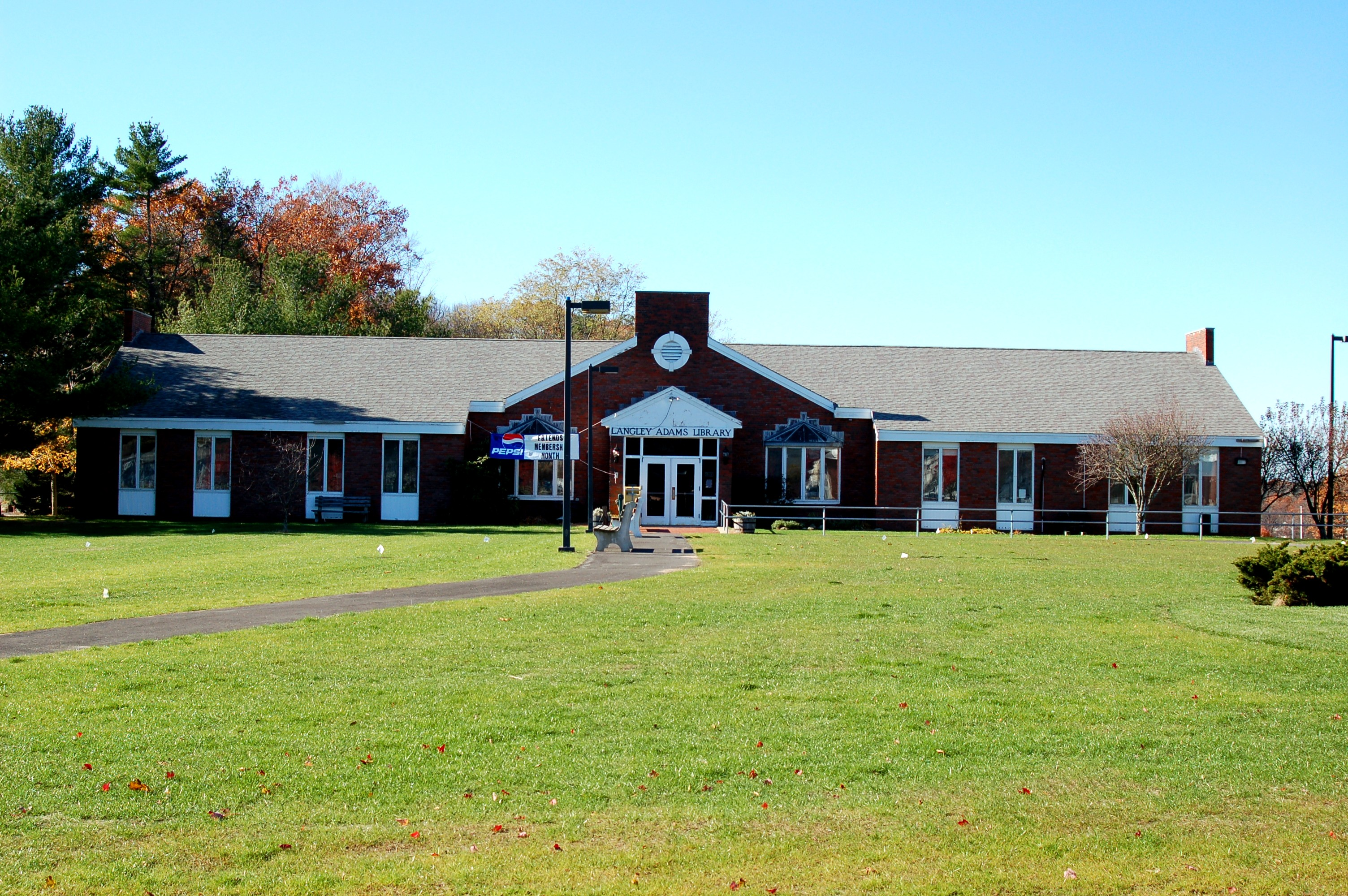
Langley-Adams Library

Langley-Adams Library is a public library and a member of the Merrimack Valley Library Consortium, sharing book-borrowing with other area libraries. The Library uses the Evergreen open source integrated library system that is common to all libraries in the Consortium.

Groveland presidential election results
Year	Democratic	Republican	Other	Total Votes	Margin
2024	50.35% 2,250	46.3% 2,069	3.06% 150	4,469	3.36%
2020	53.37% 2,421	43.56% 1,976	3.06% 139	4,536	9.81%
2016	45.57% 1,822	48.37% 1,934	6.05% 242	3,998	2.80%
2012	45.88% 1,832	52.19% 2,084	1.93% 77	3,993	6.31%
2008	49.30% 1,898	48.49% 1,867	2.21% 85	3,850	0.81%
2004	49.58% 1,782	48.83% 1,755	1.59% 57	3,594	0.75%
2000	50.11% 1,567	41.96% 1,312	7.93% 248	3,127	8.15%
1996	53.99% 1,502	32.96% 917	13.05% 363	2,782	21.03%
1992	37.98% 1,119	34.39% 1,013	27.63% 814	2,946	3.60%
1988	44.44% 1,214	53.29% 1,456	2.27% 62	2,732	8.86%
1984	36.35% 899	63.24% 1,564	0.40% 10	2,473	26.89%
1980	32.27% 776	49.52% 1,191	18.21% 438	2,405	17.26%
1976	48.23% 1,173	47.74% 1,161	4.03% 98	2,432	0.49%
1972	43.72% 999	55.45% 1,267	0.83% 19	2,285	11.73%
1968	47.64% 990	49.28% 1,024	3.08% 64	2,078	1.64%
1964	60.98% 1,125	38.64% 713	0.38% 7	1,845	22.33%
1960	37.53% 605	62.34% 1,005	0.12% 2	1,612	24.81%
1956	23.38% 314	76.40% 1,026	0.22% 3	1,343	53.02%
1952	27.22% 371	72.63% 990	0.15% 2	1,363	45.41%
1948	36.40% 431	62.16% 736	1.44% 17	1,184	25.76%
1944	38.05% 401	61.86% 652	0.09% 1	1,054	23.81%
1940	37.81% 436	61.75% 712	0.43% 5	1,153	23.94%

== Education ==
Groveland is a member of the Pentucket Regional School District, which includes the towns of West Newbury and Merrimac. Groveland itself currently has one educational institution, the Dr. Elmer S. Bagnall Elementary School. Junior and senior high school students attend Pentucket Regional Middle High School, located in West Newbury.

== Places of worship ==
- Groveland Congregational Church, 4 King Street
- St James Episcopal Church, 121 Washington Street
- New Destiny Christian Church, 2 Esty Way
- St Patrick's Parish, 114 Center Street (part of Sacred Hearts Parish of Bradford)

== Points of interest ==
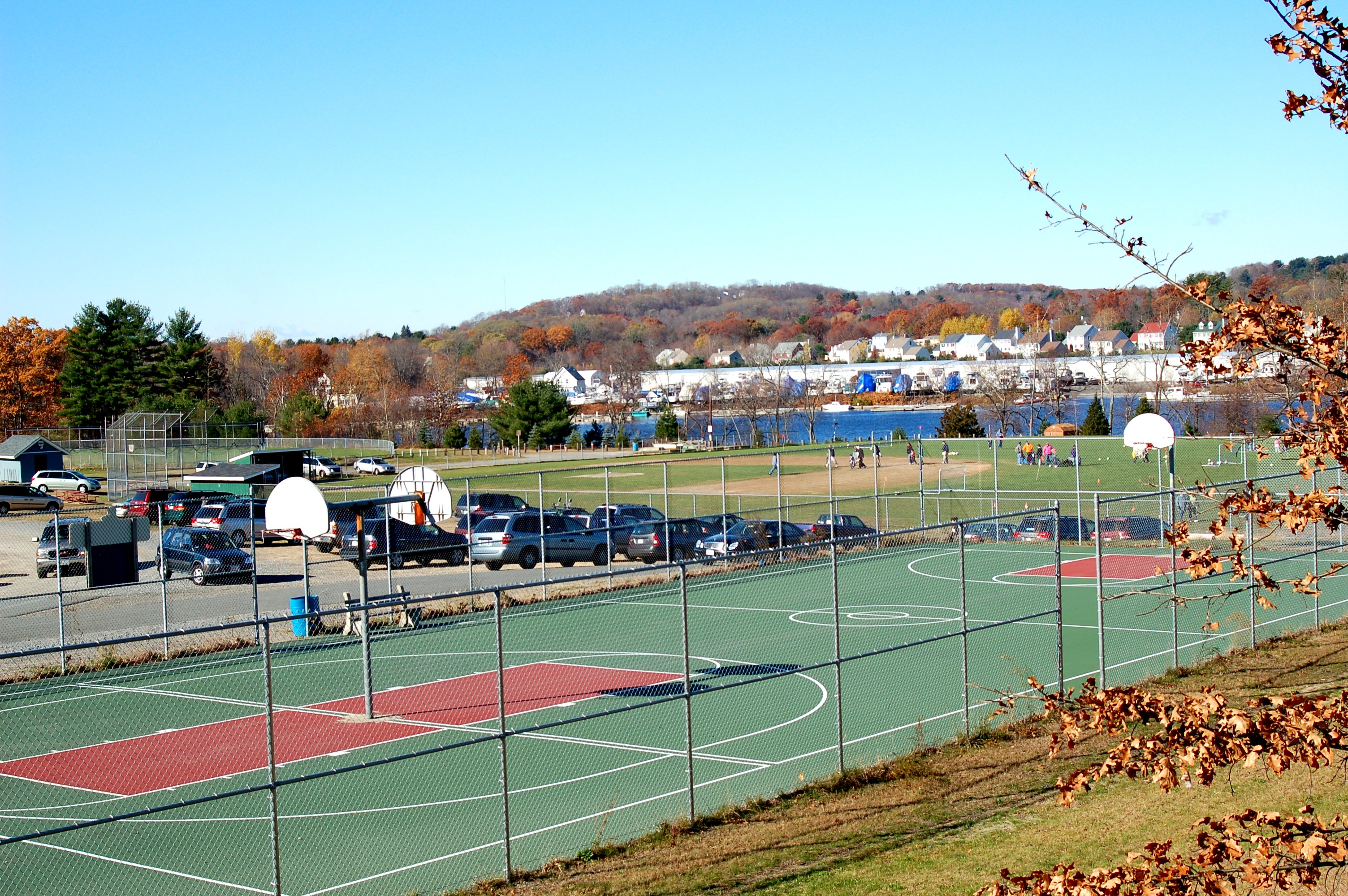
The Pines Recreation Area

The town supports baseball and soccer fields, basketball courts, picnic areas and parks, as well as boating facilities on the Merrimack River. In 2005, Groveland built Elm Park near its center, replacing a basketball court. North Groveland is also home to attractions such as Stickney's Boulder. South Groveland contains notable attractions such as Washington Park, and Nuns' Hill.

=== The Pines Recreation Area ===
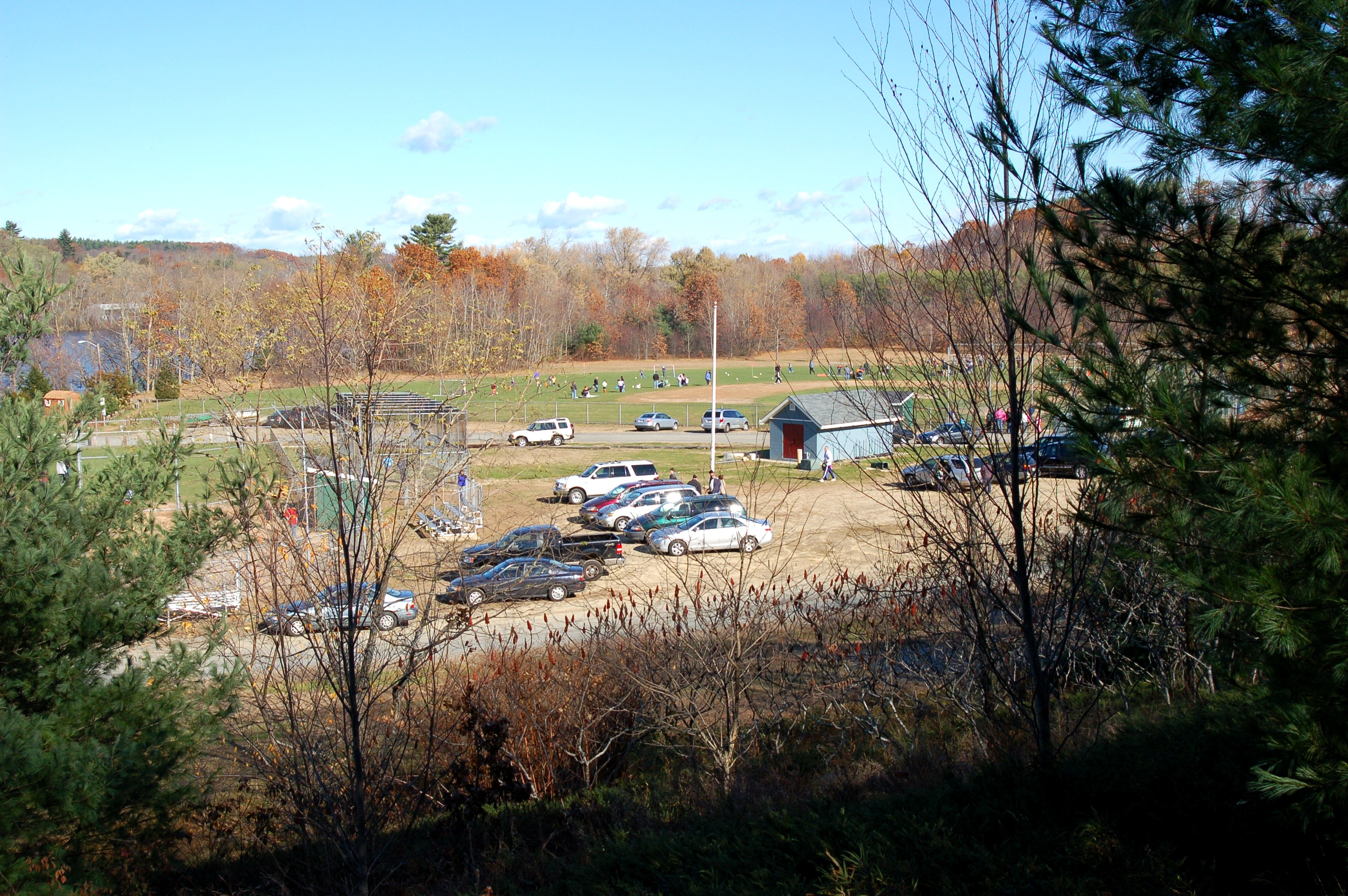
The Pines. This photograph was taken from the hillside that overlooks the Pines. In the 1950s, this spot overlooked the Pines Speedway. Many local youth sat at this very spot to catch a glimpse of the races held nearly every weekend.

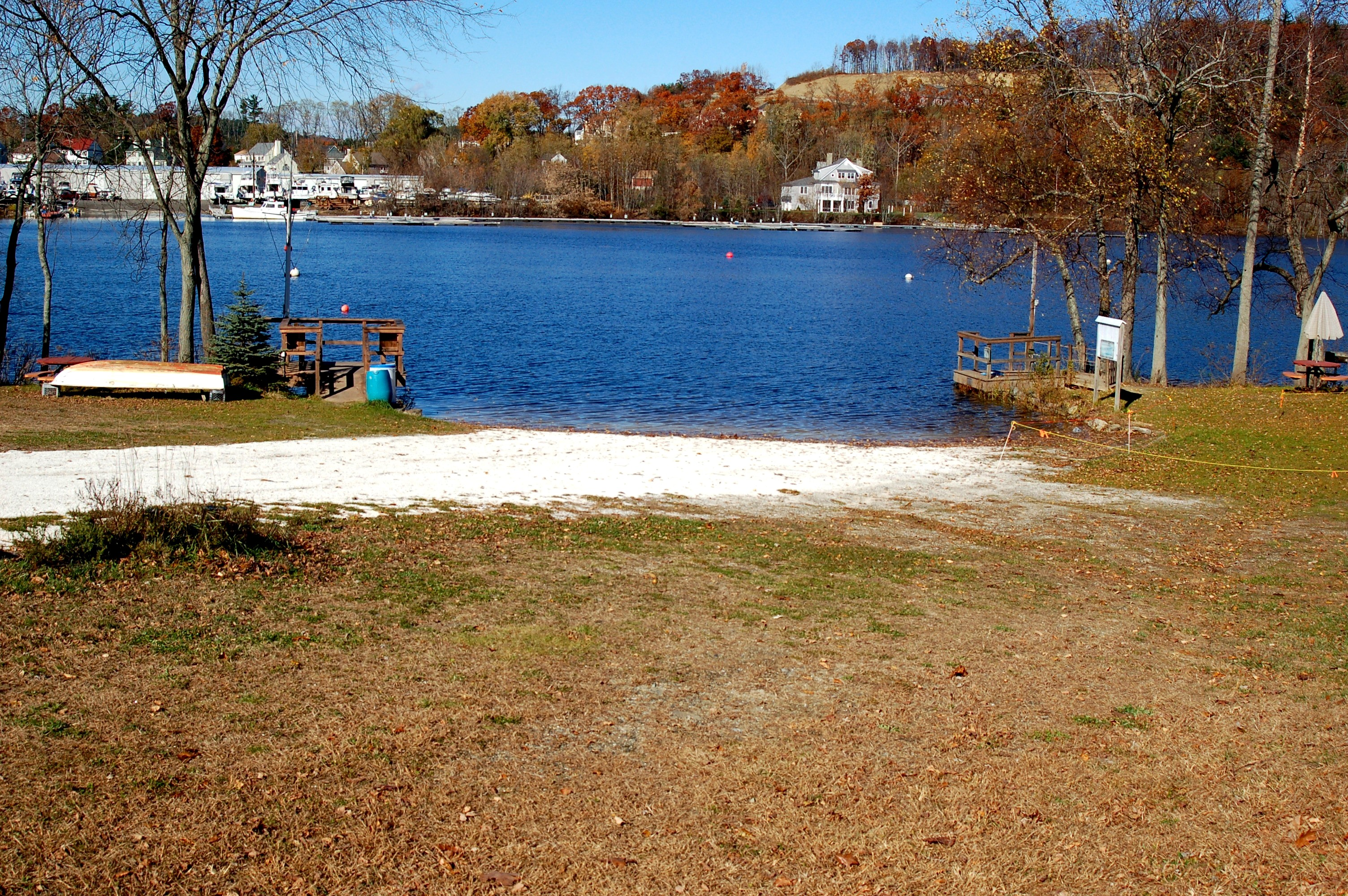
Boat ramp on the Merrimack. This is Groveland's contribution to water sports. The ramp is long with a shallow slope so that even the most amateur boaters have no problems launching and recovering their watercraft. This photograph was taken after the docks had been removed for storage for the upcoming winter.

The Pines Recreation area comprises two basketball courts, two baseball/softball diamonds, dog park, tennis and pickleball courts, playground, plus access to the Merrimack River. The Pines also provides a nature trail that runs through a wooded area along the river. Motor vehicles have been excluded from this trail so it is a quiet place to walk or jog.

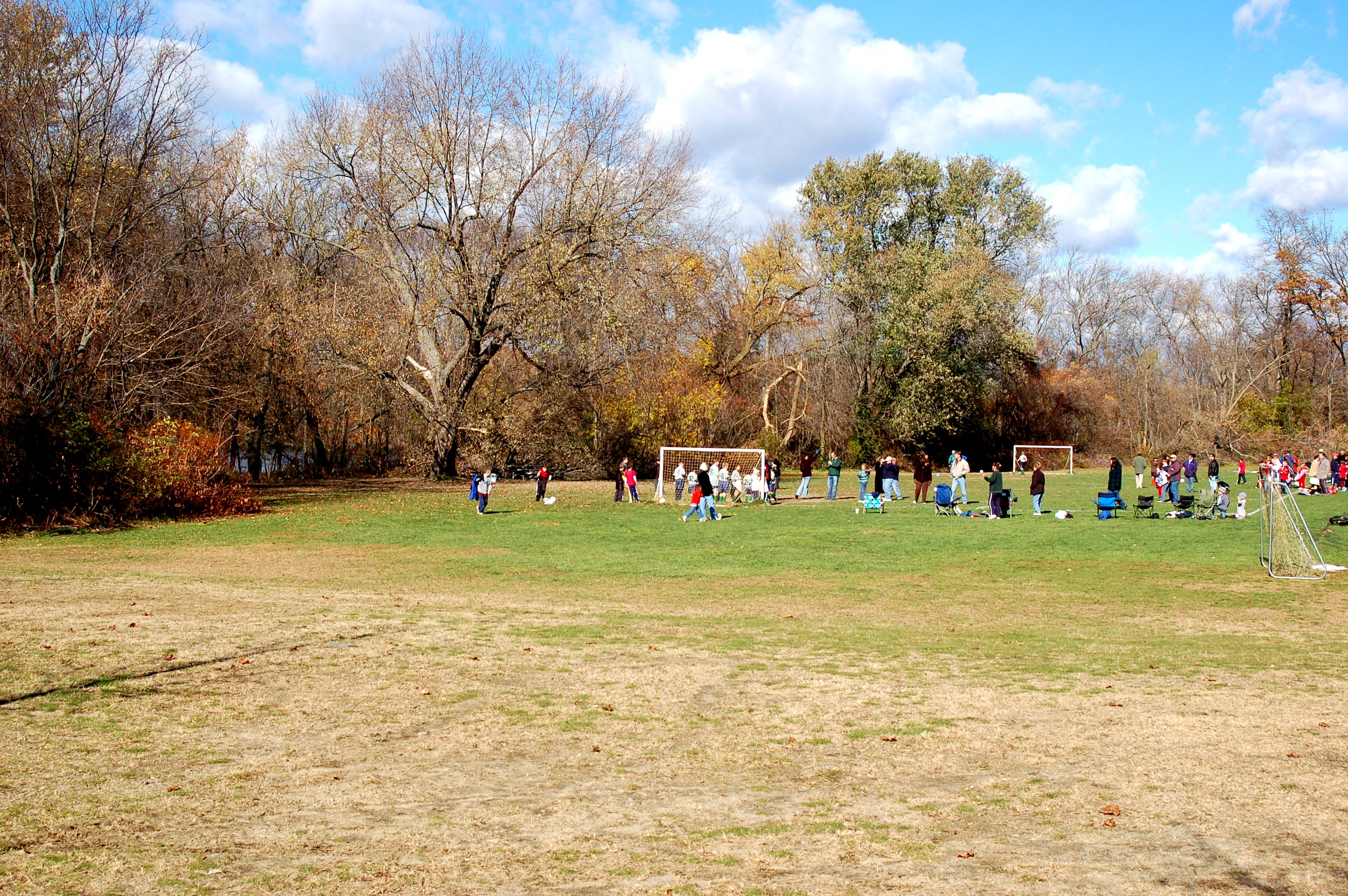
Soccer field in South Groveland. Shanahan Field (named after an elementary school that once sat on the site) is located in South Groveland. The headquarters of the Groveland Historical Society is located next to Shanahan Field.

== Notable people ==
- John G. B. Adams, American soldier who received the Medal of Honor for his actions during the American Civil War
- Larry Dorr, lifelong resident. Manager of Blood Sweat & Tears for 26 years, as well as many other musicians
