= NESBA =

NESBA may refer to:

- New England Scholastic Band Association
- Northeast Sportbike Association

== See also ==
- Nisba (disambiguation)
