= 1956 United States presidential election in Massachusetts =

- November 6, 1956
- Turnout: 89.40% (▼5.49%)

| Nominee | Dwight D. Eisenhower | Adlai Stevenson |
| Party | Republican | Democratic |
| Home state | Pennsylvania (Note: Although he was born in Texas and grew up in Kansas before his military career, at the time of his election Eisenhower was president of Columbia University and was, officially, a resident of New York. During his first term as president, he moved his private residence to Gettysburg, Pennsylvania, and officially changed his residency to Pennsylvania.) | Illinois |
| Running mate | Richard Nixon | Estes Kefauver |
| Electoral vote | 16 | 0 |
| Popular vote | 1,393,197 | 948,190 |
| Percentage | 59.32% | 40.37% |

Eisenhower
40–50%
50–60%
60–70%
70–80%
80–90%
90–100%
Stevenson
50–60%
60–70%
President before election
Dwight D. Eisenhower
Republican
Elected President
Dwight D. Eisenhower
Republican

The 1956 United States presidential election in Massachusetts took place on November 6, 1956, as part of the 1956 United States presidential election, which was held throughout all contemporary 48 states. Voters chose 16 representatives, or electors to the Electoral College, who voted for president and vice president.

Massachusetts voted decisively for the Republican nominee, incumbent President Dwight D. Eisenhower of Pennsylvania, over the Democratic nominee, former Governor Adlai Stevenson of Illinois. Eisenhower ran with incumbent Vice President Richard Nixon of California, while Stevenson's running mate was Senator Estes Kefauver of Tennessee.

Eisenhower carried the state with 59.32% of the vote to Stevenson's 40.37%, a Republican victory margin of 18.95%. As Eisenhower won a decisive re-election victory nationwide, Massachusetts weighed in for this election as about 4% more Republican than the national average. This remains the last presidential election in which Massachusetts voted more Republican than the nation, as the state would trend dramatically toward the Democratic Party beginning in 1960.

Once a typical Yankee Republican bastion in the wake of the Civil War, Massachusetts had been a Democratic-leaning state since 1928, when a coalition of Irish Catholic and other ethnic immigrant voters primarily based in urban areas turned Massachusetts and neighboring Rhode Island into New England's only reliably Democratic states. Massachusetts voted for Al Smith in 1928, for Franklin Roosevelt 4 times in the 1930s and 1940s, and for Harry S. Truman in 1948. However, General Dwight Eisenhower, a war hero and moderate Republican who pledged to support and continue popular New Deal Democratic policies, was finally able to appeal to a broad enough coalition both to win back the White House and to flip Massachusetts back into the Republican column.

In his initial 1952 campaign, Eisenhower won back Massachusetts by a closer 54–45 margin, but the popular incumbent, who governed in a very moderate way that appealed to New England voters, was able to more than double his margin of victory in the state in the 1956 election. Eisenhower carried 13 of the state's 14 counties, Stevenson's only victory coming from urban Suffolk County, home to the state's capital and largest city, Boston.

No Republican would carry Massachusetts in a presidential election again until Ronald Reagan narrowly won the state in 1980. As of the 2024 presidential election, this is the last election that a Republican has won the counties of Bristol, Hampshire and Middlesex. Eisenhower's 1,393,197 votes were also the most votes for a Republican presidential candidate in Massachusetts.

To date, this is the last time that the cities of Everett, Holyoke, Lynn, Malden, Medford, New Bedford, Newton, North Adams, Northampton, Pittsfield, Randolph, Salem, Somerville, Springfield, Winthrop, and Worcester and the towns of Adams, Arlington, Brookline, Montague, Provincetown, Sharon, Sunderland, and Watertown voted Republican.

== Results ==
1956 United States presidential election in Massachusetts
| Party | Candidate | Votes | Percentage | Electoral votes |
|---|---|---|---|---|
| Republican | Dwight D. Eisenhower (incumbent) | 1,393,197 | 59.32% | 16 |
| Democratic | Adlai Stevenson | 948,190 | 40.37% | 0 |
| Socialist Labor | Eric Hass | 5,573 | 0.24% | 0 |
| Prohibition | Enoch A. Holtwick | 1,205 | 0.05% | 0 |
| Write-ins | Write-ins | 341 | 0.01% | 0 |
| Totals | | 2,348,506 | 100.00% | 16 |

=== Results by county ===
| County | Dwight D. Eisenhower Republican | | Adlai Stevenson Democratic | | Various candidates Other parties | | Margin | | Total votes cast |
| County | # | % | # | % | # | % | # | % | Total votes cast |
|---|---|---|---|---|---|---|---|---|---|
| Barnstable | 23,472 | 83.23% | 4,672 | 16.57% | 58 | 0.21% | 18,800 | 66.66% | 28,202 |
| Berkshire | 41,355 | 61.75% | 25,361 | 37.87% | 257 | 0.38% | 15,994 | 23.88% | 66,973 |
| Bristol | 109,542 | 57.85% | 79,357 | 41.91% | 466 | 0.25% | 30,185 | 15.94% | 189,365 |
| Dukes | 2,618 | 82.85% | 541 | 17.12% | 1 | 0.03% | 2,077 | 65.73% | 3,160 |
| Essex | 166,115 | 60.09% | 109,671 | 39.67% | 667 | 0.24% | 56,444 | 20.42% | 276,453 |
| Franklin | 19,779 | 72.09% | 7,574 | 27.61% | 83 | 0.30% | 12,205 | 44.48% | 27,436 |
| Hampden | 104,689 | 55.87% | 81,743 | 43.63% | 935 | 0.50% | 22,946 | 12.24% | 187,367 |
| Hampshire | 26,361 | 61.93% | 16,119 | 37.87% | 84 | 0.20% | 10,242 | 24.06% | 42,564 |
| Middlesex | 343,125 | 61.12% | 216,668 | 38.60% | 1,580 | 0.28% | 126,457 | 22.52% | 561,373 |
| Nantucket | 1,582 | 83.26% | 317 | 16.68% | 1 | 0.05% | 1,265 | 66.58% | 1,900 |
| Norfolk | 152,747 | 66.41% | 76,656 | 33.33% | 593 | 0.26% | 76,091 | 33.08% | 229,996 |
| Plymouth | 75,575 | 71.19% | 30,377 | 28.61% | 209 | 0.20% | 45,198 | 42.58% | 106,161 |
| Suffolk | 162,836 | 45.78% | 191,245 | 53.77% | 1,605 | 0.45% | -28,409 | -7.99% | 355,686 |
| Worcester | 163,401 | 60.10% | 107,889 | 39.68% | 580 | 0.21% | 55,512 | 20.42% | 271,870 |
| Totals | 1,393,197 | 59.32% | 948,190 | 40.37% | 7,119 | 0.31% | 445,007 | 18.95% | 2,348,506 |

=== Results by congressional district ===
Eisenhower won a majority of the vote in 11 out of 14 congressional districts in Massachusetts while Stevenson won a majority of the vote in 3 districts.

| District | Eisenhower | Stevenson |
|---|---|---|
| 1st | 63.1% | 36.9% |
| 2nd | 57.3% | 42.7% |
| 3rd | 57.5% | 42.5% |
| 4th | 63.8% | 36.2% |
| 5th | 63.2% | 36.8% |
| 6th | 65.6% | 34.4% |
| 7th | 46.4% | 53.6% |
| 8th | 62.4% | 37.6% |
| 9th | 68.4% | 31.6% |
| 10th | 57.2% | 42.8% |
| 11th | 45.6% | 54.4% |
| 12th | 40.4% | 59.6% |
| 13th | 64.7% | 35.3% |
| 14th | 63.8% | 36.2% |

== See also ==
- United States presidential elections in Massachusetts
