= 1948 United States presidential election in Massachusetts =

- November 2, 1948
- Turnout: 86.74%

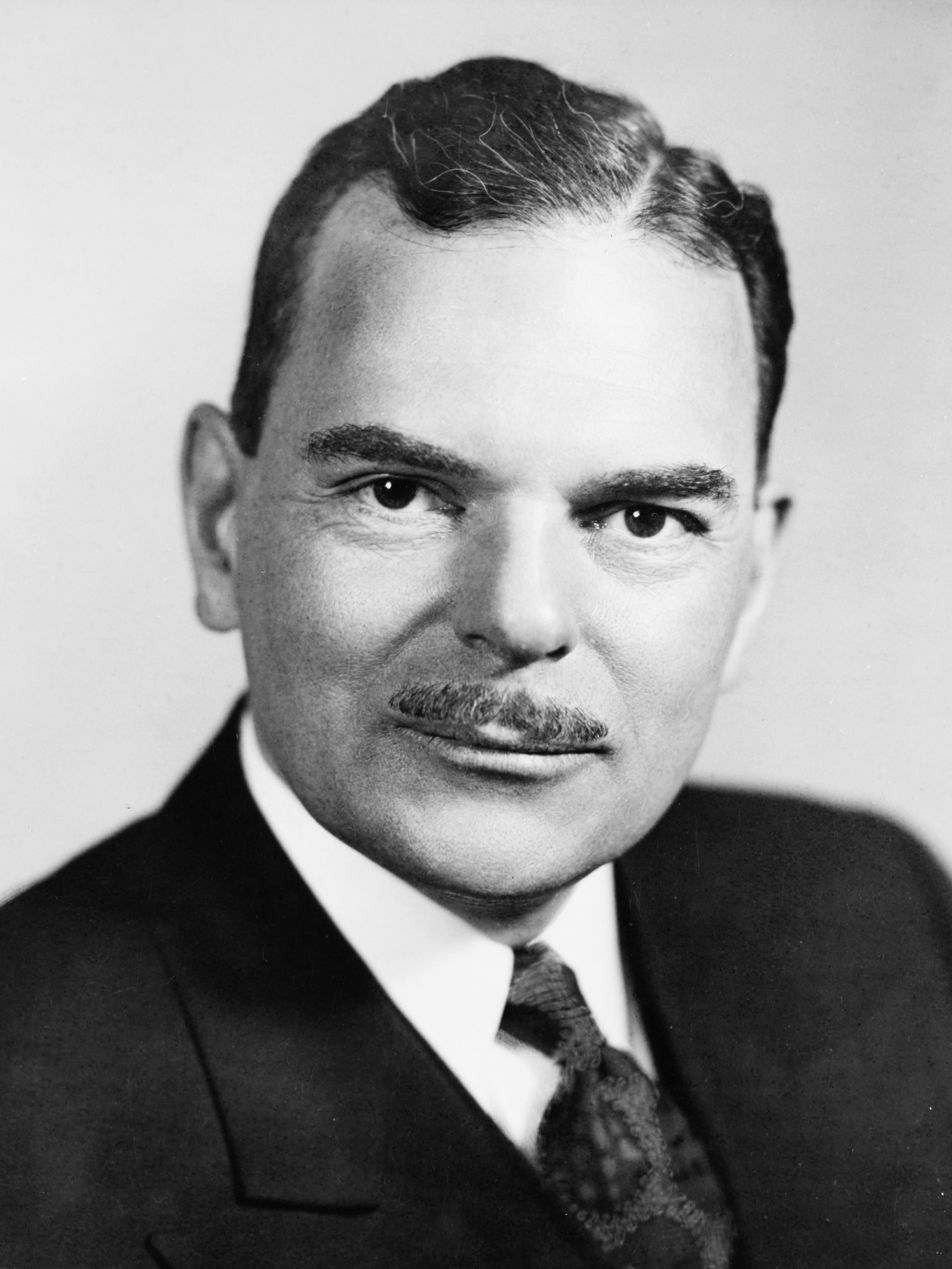
Nominee	Harry S. Truman	Thomas E. Dewey
Party	Democratic	Republican
Home state	Missouri	New York
Running mate	Alben W. Barkley	Earl Warren
Electoral vote	16	0
Popular vote	1,151,788	909,370
Percentage	54.66%	43.16%

Truman
40–50%
50–60%
60–70%
70–80%
Dewey
40–50%
50–60%
60–70%
70–80%
80–90%
90–100%
President before election
Harry S. Truman
Democratic
Elected President
Harry S. Truman
Democratic

The 1948 United States presidential election in Massachusetts took place on November 2, 1948, as part of the 1948 United States presidential election, which was held throughout all contemporary 48 states. Voters chose 16 representatives, or electors to the Electoral College, who voted for president and vice president.

Massachusetts voted for the Democratic nominee, incumbent President Harry S. Truman of Missouri, over the Republican nominee, former Governor Thomas E. Dewey of New York. Truman ran with Senator Alben W. Barkley of Kentucky, while Dewey's running mate was Governor Earl Warren of California.

Truman carried the state with 54.66% of the vote to Dewey's 43.16%, a Democratic victory margin of 11.50%. Progressive Party candidate Henry A. Wallace came in a distant third, with 1.81%. As Truman narrowly won an upset victory over Dewey nationally, Massachusetts weighed in as 7% more Democratic than the national average.

Once a typical Yankee Republican bastion in the wake of the Civil War, Massachusetts had been a Democratic-leaning state since 1928, when a coalition of Irish Catholic and other ethnic immigrant voters primarily based in urban areas turned Massachusetts and neighboring Rhode Island into New England's only reliably Democratic states. Massachusetts voted for Al Smith in 1928 and for Franklin D. Roosevelt four times in the 1930s and 1940s. Truman's victory thus marked the Democratic Party's sixth straight win in Massachusetts.

Despite the national race being much closer, Truman in 1948 outperformed any of Roosevelt's four victories in the state of Massachusetts. FDR had never won the state with more than a single-digit margin; Roosevelt's largest margin of victory was by 9.46% in 1936 and he never took a vote share higher than the 53.11% he received in 1940. In 1944, Roosevelt carried Massachusetts with 52.80% to Dewey's 46.99%, a fairly close margin of only 5.81%. Truman's victory four years later taking 54.66% and winning by 11.50% thus made 1948 the strongest showing ever by a Democratic presidential candidate in Massachusetts up to that point, a record that would stand until John F. Kennedy ran from Massachusetts in 1960.

Truman would carry 8 of the state's 14 counties, including the most heavily populated parts of the state surrounding the cities of Boston, Worcester, and Springfield. Notably, Truman flipped highly populated Middlesex County, in which did not vote for any of Franklin Roosevelt's four victories in the state, into the Democratic column. Massachusetts and neighboring Rhode Island were the only states in the Northeast to favor Truman over Dewey in 1948, the same split that had occurred in 1928. Both states had large urban Irish Catholic populations, who remained loyal Democrats in the wake of 1928, even as other groups defected back to the GOP.

== Results ==
1948 United States presidential election in Massachusetts
Party	Candidate	Votes	Percentage	Electoral votes
Democratic	Harry S. Truman (incumbent)	1,151,788	54.66%	16
Republican	Thomas E. Dewey	909,370	43.16%	0
Progressive	Henry A. Wallace	38,157	1.81%	0
Socialist Labor	Edward A. Teichert	5,535	0.26%	0
Prohibition	Claude A. Watson	1,663	0.08%	0
Write-ins	Write-ins	633	0.03%	0
Totals		2,107,146	100.00%	16

=== Results by county ===
County	Harry S. Truman Democratic		Thomas E. Dewey Republican		Henry Wallace Progressive		Various candidates Other parties		Margin		Total votes cast
County	#	%	#	%	#	%	#	%	#	%	Total votes cast
Barnstable	4,616	23.68%	14,633	75.08%	183	0.94%	58	0.30%	-10,017	-51.40%	19,490
Berkshire	30,668	51.75%	27,482	46.37%	738	1.25%	379	0.64%	3,186	5.38%	59,267
Bristol	106,741	61.86%	63,216	36.64%	1,914	1.11%	680	0.39%	43,525	25.22%	172,551
Dukes	720	28.99%	1,731	69.69%	26	1.05%	7	0.28%	-1,011	-40.70%	2,484
Essex	132,016	53.58%	108,894	44.20%	4,483	1.82%	978	0.40%	23,122	9.38%	246,371
Franklin	9,231	37.87%	14,919	61.21%	130	0.53%	93	0.38%	-5,688	-23.34%	24,373
Hampden	94,609	56.41%	70,256	41.89%	2,302	1.37%	553	0.33%	24,353	14.52%	167,720
Hampshire	18,012	50.27%	17,331	48.37%	313	0.87%	177	0.49%	681	1.90%	35,833
Middlesex	248,240	51.09%	228,262	46.98%	7,601	1.56%	1,805	0.37%	19,978	4.11%	485,908
Nantucket	409	28.36%	1,013	70.25%	14	0.97%	6	0.42%	-604	-41.89%	1,442
Norfolk	72,327	40.92%	100,280	56.74%	3,420	1.94%	710	0.40%	-27,953	-15.82%	176,737
Plymouth	34,765	40.83%	48,925	57.46%	1,281	1.50%	175	0.21%	-14,160	-16.63%	85,146
Suffolk	265,611	68.98%	105,671	27.44%	12,360	3.21%	1,425	0.37%	159,940	41.54%	385,067
Worcester	133,823	54.68%	106,757	43.62%	3,382	1.38%	785	0.32%	27,066	11.06%	244,757
Totals	1,151,788	54.66%	909,370	43.16%	38,157	1.81%	7,831	0.37%	242,418	11.50%	2,107,146

==== Counties that flipped from Republican to Democratic ====
- Middlesex

== See also ==
- United States presidential elections in Massachusetts
