= Nisba =

The Arabic word nisba (نسبة; also transcribed as nisbah or nisbat) may refer to:

- Nisba, a suffix used to form adjectives in Arabic grammar, or the adjective resulting from this formation
  - comparatively, in Afro-Asiatic: see Afroasiatic languages#nisba
- Nisba (onomastics), a word used as an element in an Arabic name
