= New England Scholastic Band Association =

The New England Scholastic Band Association or NESBA as it is more commonly known, is a sanctioning body for marching band, winter percussion, and winter guard contests in the New England region.

== Marching band ==
Each fall, NESBA holds several marching band competitions, in which anywhere from 10 to 40 bands from across New England compete. The bands are scored individually on a scale of 0–100. The scores are broken down into 5 subcategories:

- General Effect Music - a grade of the overall impression of the musical selections
- Ensemble Music - a grade of the quality and arrangement of the musical selections
- Performance Music - a grade of the execution of the musical selections
- General Effect Visual - a grade of the overall impression of the drill and visual aspects of the show
- Performance Visual - a grade of the execution of the drill and visual aspects of the show

Each subcategory is given a grade from 0 to 20, and the 5 scores are added to get the total score. Medals are awarded on the following scale:

- Bronze: 45.00 - 74.99
- Silver: 75.00 - 84.99
- Gold: 85.00 - 94.99
- Platinum: 95.00 and above

In addition, caption awards are given to one group in each division for the following categories:

- High Auxiliary - selected by visual judges for the best colorguard and other visual effects
- High Music - selected by the music performance and ensemble judges, and given to the band with the highest aggregate scores in Performance and Ensemble Music
- High Percussion - selected by all music judges for the best percussion and pit ensemble.
