= 1976 United States presidential election in Massachusetts =

- November 2, 1976
- Turnout: 82.47% (▲1.71%)

Nominee	Jimmy Carter	Gerald Ford
Party	Democratic	Republican
Home state	Georgia	Michigan
Running mate	Walter Mondale	Bob Dole
Electoral vote	14	0
Popular vote	1,429,475	1,030,276
Percentage	56.11%	40.44%

Carter
40–50%
50–60%
60–70%
70–80%
80–90%
Ford
40–50%
50–60%
60–70%
70–80%
President before election
Gerald Ford
Republican
Elected President
Jimmy Carter
Democratic

The 1976 United States presidential election in Massachusetts took place on November 2, 1976, as part of the 1976 United States presidential election, which was held throughout all 50 states and D.C. Voters chose 14 representatives, or electors to the Electoral College, who voted for president and vice president.

Massachusetts voted for the Democratic nominee, Georgia Governor Jimmy Carter, over incumbent Republican President Gerald Ford of Michigan. Carter's running mate was Senator Walter Mondale of Minnesota, while Ford ran with Senator Bob Dole of Kansas.

Carter carried Massachusetts with 56.11% of the vote to Ford's 40.44%, a 15.67% margin of victory. In a distant third was Independent candidate Eugene McCarthy, a former Democratic Senator from Minnesota known for his anti-war activism, who took 2.58%.

As Carter narrowly defeated Ford nationally to win the presidency, Massachusetts weighed in as 13% more Democratic than the national average in the 1976 election. Massachusetts had been a Democratic-leaning state since 1928, and a Democratic stronghold since 1960, so Carter's win was not unexpected. In 1972, Massachusetts was the only state in the nation to vote for Democrat George McGovern over Republican Richard Nixon in the latter's 49-state landslide. McGovern had carried Massachusetts 54–45, despite losing every other state in the midst of a massive Republican landslide.

Ford for his part performed relatively strongly in the state as a moderate Northern Republican, holding at just over 40% of the vote, while Carter gained only slightly over McGovern- even though Carter was winning nationally while McGovern was losing in a landslide. The state's capital and largest city, Boston, would be one of the few regions in the country where McGovern would actually perform more strongly than Carter in absolute terms. Suffolk County, where Boston is located, had voted for George McGovern in 1972 by a landslide of 66% versus Richard Nixon's 33%, but in 1976, Carter would only win the county with 61% versus Gerald Ford's 35%. Nevertheless, Dukes County, home to Martha's Vineyard, cast only its second-ever Democratic presidential vote, after 1964. This similarly occurred in Franklin County, and Plymouth cast only its third-ever Democratic victory. This is also the state with the most electoral votes that was decided by double digits.

In the 1960s, for three elections straight beginning with John F. Kennedy in 1960, Democrats had won landslides of over 60% of the vote, with Republicans failing to break 40%. Even in the GOP landslide of 1972, Massachusetts had clocked in as a whopping 32% more Democratic than the nation. Thus overall the results of 1976 indicated a slight Republican rebound in the state that would continue into the 1980s. To date, this is the last time that the towns of Chilmark and Conway voted Republican.

== Results ==
1976 United States presidential election in Massachusetts
Party	Candidate	Votes	Percentage	Electoral votes
Democratic	Jimmy Carter	1,429,475	56.11%	14
Republican	Gerald Ford (incumbent)	1,030,276	40.44%	0
Independent	Eugene McCarthy	65,637	2.58%	0
Socialist Workers	Peter Camejo	8,138	0.32%	0
American	Thomas J. Anderson	7,555	0.30%	0
U.S. Labor	Lyndon LaRouche	4,922	0.19%	0
Write-ins	Write-ins	1,554	0.06%	0
Totals		2,547,557	100.00%	14
Voter Turnout (Voting age/Registered)				62%/81%

=== Results by county ===
County	Jimmy Carter Democratic		Gerald Ford Republican		Various candidates Other parties		Margin		Total votes cast
County	#	%	#	%	#	%	#	%	Total votes cast
Barnstable	31,568	43.00%	39,295	53.52%	2,554	3.48%	-7,727	-10.52%	73,417
Berkshire	39,337	57.12%	27,462	39.87%	2,072	3.01%	11,875	17.25%	68,871
Bristol	116,318	60.66%	69,957	36.48%	5,494	2.86%	46,361	24.18%	191,769
Dukes	2,513	48.94%	2,365	46.06%	257	5.00%	148	2.88%	5,135
Essex	165,710	54.97%	125,538	41.65%	10,196	3.38%	40,172	13.32%	301,444
Franklin	14,985	48.06%	14,837	47.58%	1,359	4.36%	148	0.48%	31,181
Hampden	110,028	59.38%	70,008	37.78%	5,254	2.84%	40,020	21.60%	185,298
Hampshire	34,947	58.17%	22,219	36.99%	2,909	4.84%	12,728	21.18%	60,075
Middlesex	359,919	55.77%	260,044	40.29%	25,419	3.94%	99,875	15.48%	645,382
Nantucket	1,115	42.46%	1,399	53.27%	112	4.27%	-284	-10.81%	2,626
Norfolk	155,342	51.33%	136,628	45.15%	10,646	3.52%	18,714	6.18%	302,616
Plymouth	83,663	50.88%	74,684	45.42%	6,086	3.70%	8,979	5.46%	164,433
Suffolk	142,010	61.11%	80,623	34.70%	9,739	4.19%	61,387	26.41%	232,372
Worcester	172,320	60.41%	105,217	36.89%	7,707	2.70%	67,103	23.52%	285,244
Totals	1,429,475	56.11%	1,030,276	40.44%	87,806	3.45%	399,199	15.67%	2,547,558

==== Counties that flipped from Republican to Democratic ====
- Dukes
- Franklin
- Plymouth

== See also ==
- United States presidential elections in Massachusetts
