= 1944 United States presidential election in Massachusetts =

- November 7, 1944

Nominee	Franklin D. Roosevelt	Thomas E. Dewey
Party	Democratic	Republican
Home state	New York	New York
Running mate	Harry S. Truman	John W. Bricker
Electoral vote	16	0
Popular vote	1,035,296	921,350
Percentage	52.80%	46.99%

Roosevelt
50–60%
60–70%
70–80%
Dewey
40–50%
50–60%
60–70%
70–80%
80–90%
90–100%
President before election
Franklin D. Roosevelt
Democratic
Elected President
Franklin D. Roosevelt
Democratic

The 1944 United States presidential election in Massachusetts took place on November 7, 1944, as part of the 1944 United States presidential election, which was held throughout all contemporary 48 states. Voters chose 16 representatives, or electors to the Electoral College, who voted for president and vice president.

Massachusetts voted for the Democratic nominee, incumbent President Franklin D. Roosevelt of New York, over the Republican nominee, Governor Thomas E. Dewey of New York. Roosevelt ran with Senator Harry S. Truman of Missouri, while Dewey's running mate was Governor John W. Bricker of Ohio.

Roosevelt carried the state with 52.80% of the vote to Dewey's 46.99%, a Democratic victory margin of 5.81%.

As Roosevelt was re-elected nationally to his fourth and final term, Massachusetts weighed in as about 2% more Republican than the national average.

Once a typical Yankee Republican bastion in the wake of the Civil War, Massachusetts had been a Democratic-leaning state since 1928, when a coalition of Irish Catholic and other ethnic immigrant voters primarily based in urban areas turned Massachusetts and neighboring Rhode Island into New England's only reliably Democratic states. Massachusetts voted for Al Smith in 1928, and for Franklin Roosevelt in his three election campaigns preceding 1944. Roosevelt's 1944 victory thus marked the fifth straight win for the Democratic Party in Massachusetts, although Roosevelt's victory margin was slightly reduced from 1940.

Roosevelt and Dewey would split the state's 14 counties, winning 7 counties each. However Roosevelt won the most heavily populated parts of the state including the cities of Boston, Worcester, and Springfield, while most of Dewey's wins were small or island counties.

== Results ==
1944 United States presidential election in Massachusetts
Party	Candidate	Votes	Percentage	Electoral votes
Democratic	Franklin D. Roosevelt (incumbent)	1,035,296	52.80%	16
Republican	Thomas E. Dewey	921,350	46.99%	0
Socialist Labor	Edward A. Teichert	2,780	0.14%	0
Prohibition	Claude A. Watson	973	0.05%	0
Write-ins	Write-ins	266	0.01%	0
Totals		1,960,665	100.00%	16

=== Results by county ===
County	Franklin D. Roosevelt Democratic		Thomas E. Dewey Republican		Various candidates Other parties		Margin		Total votes cast
County	#	%	#	%	#	%	#	%	Total votes cast
Barnstable	4,938	29.88%	11,543	69.85%	44	0.27%	-6,605	-39.97%	16,525
Berkshire	31,212	55.51%	24,830	44.16%	185	0.33%	6,382	11.35%	56,227
Bristol	90,529	59.68%	60,880	40.13%	283	0.19%	29,649	19.55%	151,692
Dukes	861	38.54%	1,372	61.41%	1	0.04%	-511	-22.87%	2,234
Essex	118,228	51.24%	111,958	48.52%	570	0.25%	6,270	2.72%	230,756
Franklin	9,400	41.40%	13,252	58.37%	51	0.22%	-3,852	-16.97%	22,703
Hampden	91,819	59.05%	63,293	40.71%	374	0.24%	28,526	18.34%	155,486
Hampshire	17,676	54.09%	14,907	45.62%	97	0.30%	2,769	8.47%	32,680
Middlesex	210,253	47.03%	236,102	52.81%	725	0.16%	-25,849	-5.78%	447,080
Nantucket	569	42.18%	779	57.75%	1	0.07%	-210	-15.57%	1,349
Norfolk	69,606	41.56%	97,490	58.21%	383	0.23%	-27,884	-16.65%	167,479
Plymouth	32,290	40.51%	47,245	59.27%	174	0.22%	-14,955	-18.76%	79,709
Suffolk	234,475	62.61%	139,285	37.19%	727	0.19%	95,190	25.42%	374,487
Worcester	123,440	55.54%	98,414	44.28%	404	0.18%	25,026	11.26%	222,258
Totals	1,035,296	52.80%	921,350	46.99%	4,019	0.20%	113,946	5.81%	1,960,665

== See also ==
- United States presidential elections in Massachusetts
