= 1940 United States presidential election in Massachusetts =

- November 5, 1940
- Turnout: 78.7% ▲2.8 pp

Nominee	Franklin D. Roosevelt	Wendell Willkie
Party	Democratic	Republican
Home state	New York	New York
Running mate	Henry A. Wallace	Charles L. McNary
Electoral vote	17	0
Popular vote	1,076,522	939,700
Percentage	53.11%	46.36%

Roosevelt
40–50%
50–60%
60–70%
70–80%
Willkie
40–50%
50–60%
60–70%
70–80%
80–90%
90–100%
President before election
Franklin D. Roosevelt
Democratic
Elected President
Franklin D. Roosevelt
Democratic

The 1940 United States presidential election in Massachusetts took place on November 5, 1940, as part of the 1940 United States presidential election, held throughout all contemporary 48 states. Voters chose 17 representatives, or electors to the Electoral College, who voted for president and vice president.

Massachusetts voted for the Democratic nominee, incumbent President Franklin D. Roosevelt of New York, over the Republican nominee, corporate lawyer Wendell Willkie of New York. Roosevelt ran with Secretary of Agriculture Henry A. Wallace of Iowa, while Willkie's running mate was Senate Minority Leader Charles L. McNary of Oregon.

Roosevelt carried the state with 53.11% of the vote to Willkie's 46.36%, a Democratic victory margin of 6.75%. As Roosevelt was re-elected nationally to an unprecedented third term, Massachusetts weighed in as about 3% more Republican than the national average. Roosevelt's win may have been aided by support in New England for aid to Britain during World War Two, as he maintained his votes better among those of English descent than the German-American populations of the interior.

Once a typical Yankee Republican bastion in the wake of the Civil War, Massachusetts had been a Democratic-leaning state since 1928, when a coalition of Irish Catholic and other ethnic immigrant voters primarily based in urban areas turned Massachusetts and neighboring Rhode Island into New England's only reliably Democratic states. Massachusetts voted for Al Smith in 1928, and for Franklin Roosevelt in his national Democratic landslides of 1932 and 1936. Roosevelt's 1940 victory thus marked the fourth straight win for the Democratic Party in Massachusetts, a state that had voted Democratic only once in its history prior to this series of consecutive Democratic wins. Roosevelt and Willkie would split the state's 14 counties, winning seven counties each. However, Roosevelt won the most heavily populated parts of the state including the cities of Boston, Worcester, and Springfield, while most of Willkie's wins were small or island counties.

== Results ==
1940 United States presidential election in Massachusetts
Party	Candidate	Votes	Percentage	Electoral votes
Democratic	Franklin D. Roosevelt (incumbent)	1,076,522	53.11%	17
Republican	Wendell Willkie	939,700	46.36%	0
Socialist	Norman Thomas	4,091	0.20%	0
Communist	Earl Browder	3,806	0.19%	0
Socialist Labor	John W. Aiken	1,492	0.07%	0
Prohibition	Roger Babson	1,370	0.07%	0
Write-ins	Write-ins	12	0.00%	0
Totals		2,026,993	100.00%	17

=== Results by county ===
County	Franklin D. Roosevelt Democratic		Wendell Willkie Republican		Various candidates Other parties		Margin		Total votes cast
County	#	%	#	%	#	%	#	%	Total votes cast
Barnstable	5,351	29.53%	12,659	69.87%	108	0.60%	-7,308	-40.34%	18,118
Berkshire	32,620	55.40%	25,973	44.11%	287	0.49%	6,647	11.29%	58,880
Bristol	97,571	61.60%	60,143	37.97%	677	0.43%	37,428	23.63%	158,391
Dukes	1,014	37.98%	1,643	61.54%	13	0.49%	-629	-23.56%	2,670
Essex	125,998	51.69%	116,134	47.65%	1,603	0.66%	9,864	4.04%	243,735
Franklin	9,472	39.92%	14,137	59.58%	119	0.50%	-4,665	-19.66%	23,728
Hampden	89,477	57.80%	64,502	41.67%	817	0.53%	24,975	16.13%	154,796
Hampshire	17,823	52.86%	15,651	46.42%	241	0.71%	2,172	6.44%	33,715
Middlesex	218,662	47.18%	242,658	52.36%	2,116	0.46%	-23,996	-5.18%	463,436
Nantucket	624	37.89%	1,015	61.63%	8	0.49%	-391	-23.74%	1,647
Norfolk	67,654	40.75%	97,525	58.74%	838	0.50%	-29,871	-17.99%	166,017
Plymouth	34,481	41.24%	48,617	58.15%	508	0.61%	-14,136	-16.91%	83,606
Suffolk	243,233	63.32%	138,575	36.07%	2,337	0.61%	104,658	27.25%	384,145
Worcester	132,541	56.62%	100,468	42.92%	1,099	0.47%	32,073	13.70%	234,108
Totals	1,076,522	53.11%	939,700	46.36%	10,771	0.53%	136,822	6.75%	2,026,993

== See also ==
- United States presidential elections in Massachusetts
