= Boxford =

Boxford may refer to:

- Boxford, Berkshire, England
  - Boxford railway station
- Boxford, Suffolk, England
- Boxford, Massachusetts, United States
  - Boxford (CDP), Massachusetts
- Boxford, Missouri, United States
- Boxford Lathe, a brand of machine tool
