= Boxford Village Historic District =

Historic district in Massachusetts, United States

- U.S. National Register of Historic Places
- U.S. Historic district
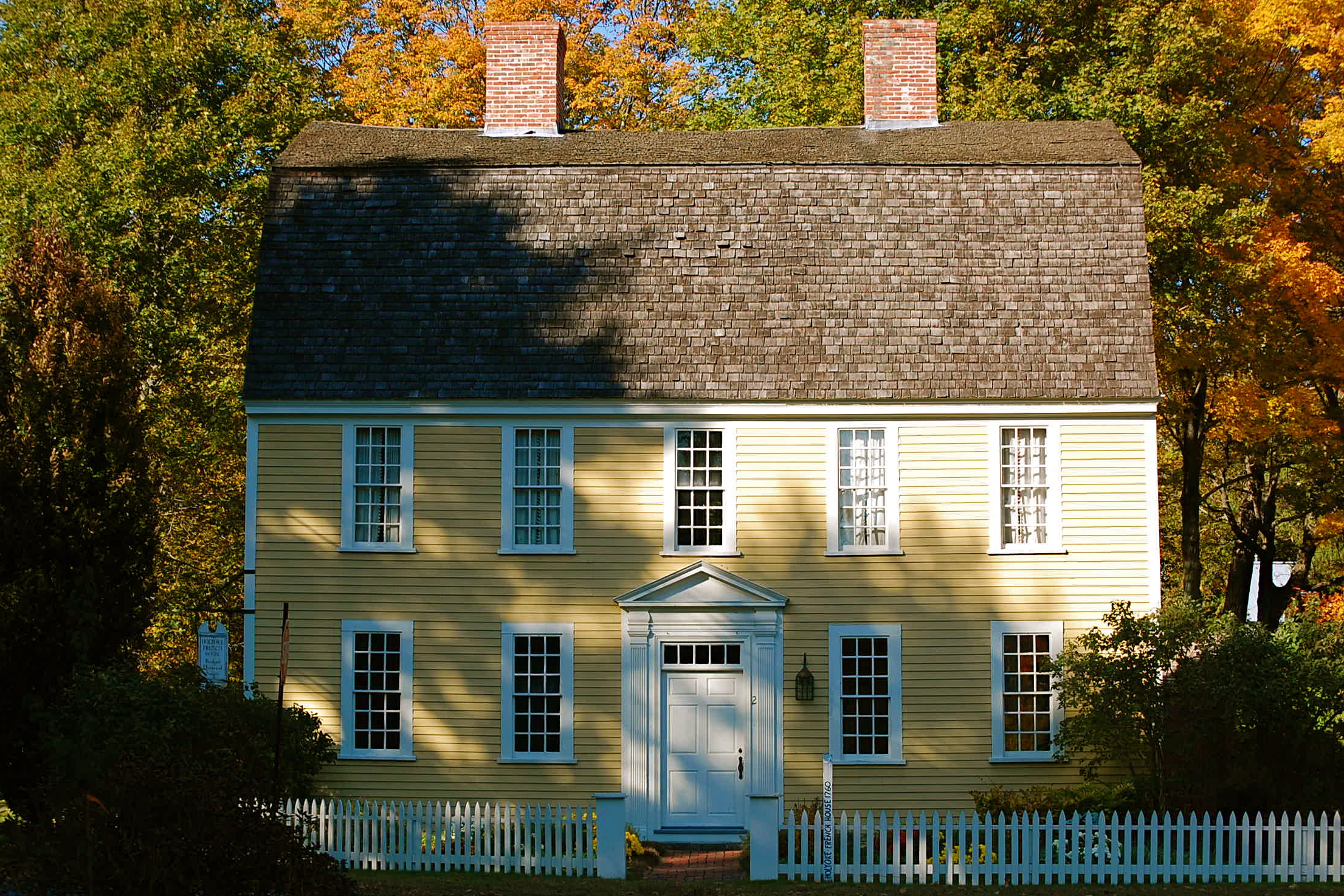
- Holyoke-French House

- Location within Massachusetts Location within the United States
- Location: Boxford, Massachusetts
- Coordinates: 42°39′43″N 70°59′58″W
- Built: 1667
- Architectural style: Greek Revival, Colonial
- NRHP reference No.: 73000279
- Added to NRHP: April 11, 1973

The Boxford Village Historic District encompasses the historic early center of Boxford, Massachusetts, which was established in 1638 and incorporated in 1685.

== Overview ==
The district runs from near Towne Road in the west, along Main Street and Topsfield Road to Dana Road, and includes sections of Middleton Road (between Main and Elm), Elm Street (between Main and Middleton), Depot Road (between Main and Cross) and Cross Street (between Depot and Topsfield). It includes a remarkable concentration of structures dating to no later than the late 18th century. The district was listed on the National Register of Historic Places in 1973. It includes the Holyoke-French House, a First Period house owned by the Boxford Historical Society and operated as a house museum.

The district was named as one of the 1,000 places to visit in Massachusetts by the Great Places in Massachusetts Commission.

== See also ==
- Howe Village Historic District
- National Register of Historic Places listings in Essex County, Massachusetts
- List of the oldest buildings in Massachusetts
