= Norfolk County =

Norfolk County may refer to:

- Norfolk County, Massachusetts, United States
- Norfolk County, Ontario, Canada
- Norfolk County, Virginia, (defunct)
- Norfolk, a county in England
- Norfolk, Virginia, an independent city and county-equivalent in Virginia, United States
- "Old" Norfolk County, Massachusetts Colony (extinct)
