= Howe Village Historic District =

Historic district in Massachusetts, United States

- U.S. National Register of Historic Places
- U.S. Historic district
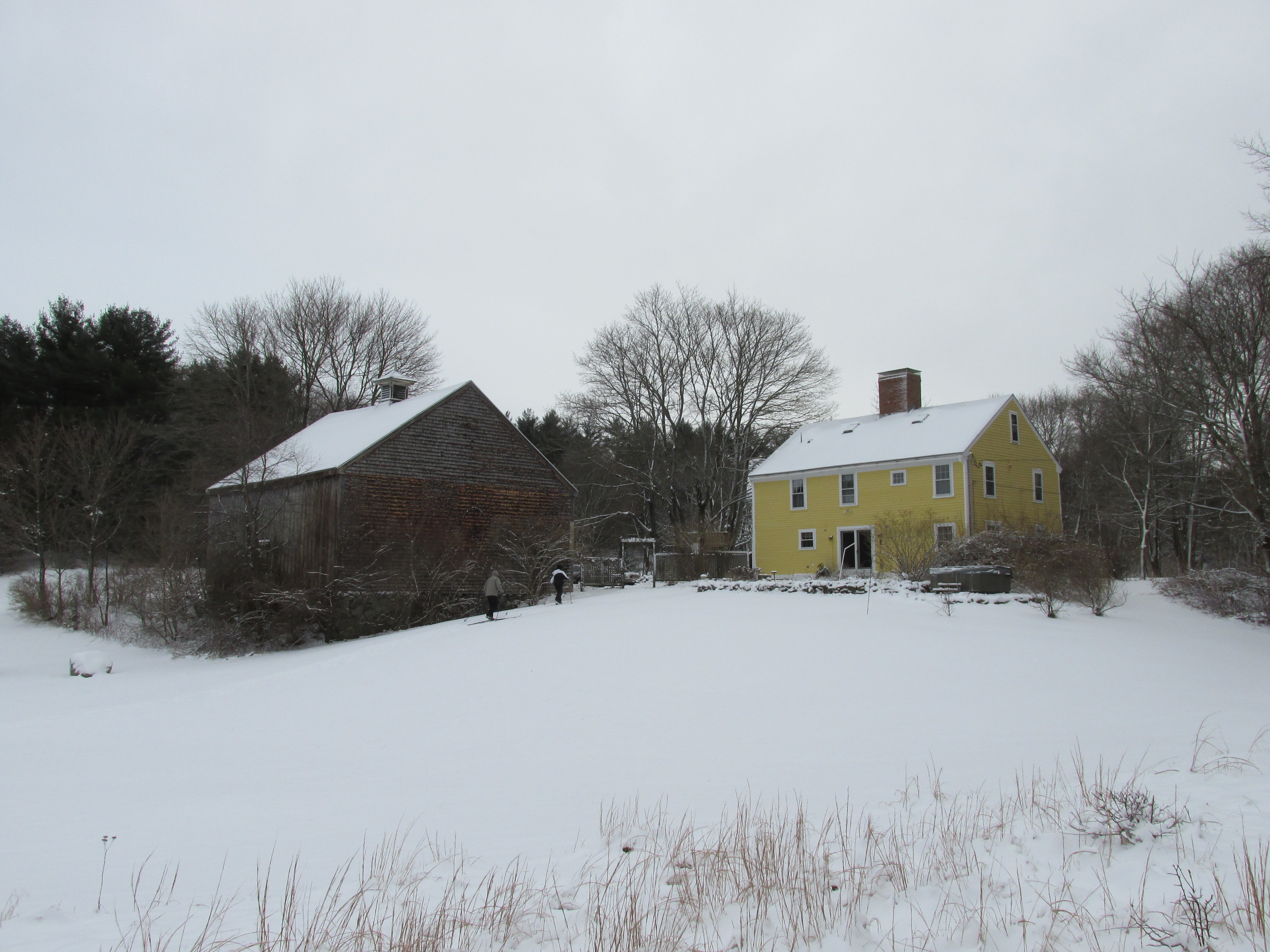
- Ipswich Road at Pye Brook Lane

- Location within Massachusetts Location within the United States
- Nearest city: Boxford, Massachusetts
- Coordinates: 42°40′32″N 70°58′8″W
- Built: 1684
- Architectural style: Colonial, Federal
- NRHP reference No.: 73000282
- Added to NRHP: April 3, 1973

The Howe Village Historic District is a historic district in Boxford, Massachusetts. It encompasses an area in and around Massachusetts Route 97, just east of Interstate 95 and south of the junction of those two roads, and includes most of the properties on Ipswich Road and a few on adjacent roads. This area was among the first to be settled in what is now Boxford, and consists of a rural cluster of houses built between about 1750 and 1850. The district was listed on the National Register of Historic Places in 1973.

== Description and history ==
The town of Boxford was incorporated in 1685, but had probably been settled earlier by landowners from Rowley, from which it was divided. Ipswich Road was from an early date the principal road between Ipswich and Andover, two early colonial settlements. Thomas Perley purchased land along the road and built a tavern in 1684 to serve passing travelers. The site of his tavern is where what is now known as the Asa Perley House stands; it was either built about 1760, or is a substantial alteration of Thomas Perley's original house. Aaron Perley, a later descendant of Thomas, built the fine Federal style house at 35 Ipswich Road in about 1818. Members of the Perley family played a significant role in the early civic life of Boxford, and continue to live in the community.

The oldest house with certain dating is the Old Hale House (15 Ipswich Road), which dates to about 1749, and belonged to the Hale family until the late 19th century. Four of the seven historic houses in the district were built by members of the Howe family in the first half of the 19th century. The Howes were industrious, and several of its members were involved in the shoemaking trade, which at that time was a cottage industry operated out of people's homes or small outbuildings. Both the Edward Howe House (5 Ipswich) and William Howe House (7 Ipswich) were used in shoemaking operations until late in the 19th century.

== See also ==
- Boxford Village Historic District
- National Register of Historic Places listings in Essex County, Massachusetts
