= Dickinson–Pillsbury–Witham House =

Historic house in Massachusetts, United States

- U.S. National Register of Historic Places
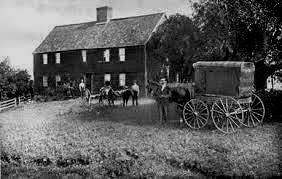
- An early photo of the Dickinson–Pillsbury–Witham House

- Location within Massachusetts Location within the United States
- Location: 170 Jewett Street, Georgetown, Massachusetts
- Coordinates: 42°43′44.04″N 70°56′42″W
- Built: c. 1700
- Architectural style: First Period, Colonial
- MPS: First Period Buildings of Eastern Massachusetts TR
- NRHP reference No.: 90000210
- Added to NRHP: March 9, 1990

The Dickinson–Pillsbury–Witham House is a historic First Period house which, along with an 18th-century barn, sits on an 8.84-acre lot in Georgetown, Massachusetts. The well-preserved building with its massive original hardwood frame has many surviving early components, including a rare original enclosed stairway, doors, wooden latches, hardware, cupboards, brick nogging in the walls, and early paint.

The house was the original home of the Georgetown Historical Society. The Society moved to the Brocklebank–Nelson–Beecher House in 1975 and sold the Dickinson–Pillsbury–Witham House to an archaeologist, who took meticulous care of the property for over 40 years. During that time the building was surveyed by architectural historian and genealogist Abbott Lowell Cummings.

The oldest part of the 2 1/2-story wood-frame colonial house was built c. 1700 by James Dickinson, and consisted of the chimney and rooms to its right. The left side rooms are also First Period, apparently built soon afterward, based on similar construction methods used on the two sections. In 1856 a knee-wall cape was moved to the lot and attached as an ell on the right-hand side against the oldest end of the dwelling.

In addition to historical integrity, the house is notable for being the home of War of 1812 veteran and inventor Paul Pillsbury, who purchased the property about 1801. His inventions included devices for pegging shoes, milling bark off tree sections, and stripping kernels from ears of corn. Paul Pillsbury and his wife Elisabeth Frink had a family of seven sons and one daughter. Elisabeth died in 1829 at age 41. Pillsbury remarried in 1843 to Sarah Andrews Pike, the widow of Benjamin Pike and mother of CSA Brigadier-General Albert Pike. Paul Pillsbury was also the uncle of abolitionist Parker Pillsbury and the great-uncle of attorney Albert E. Pillsbury who drafted the bylaws of the NAACP.

The house was listed on the National Register of Historic Places in 1990.

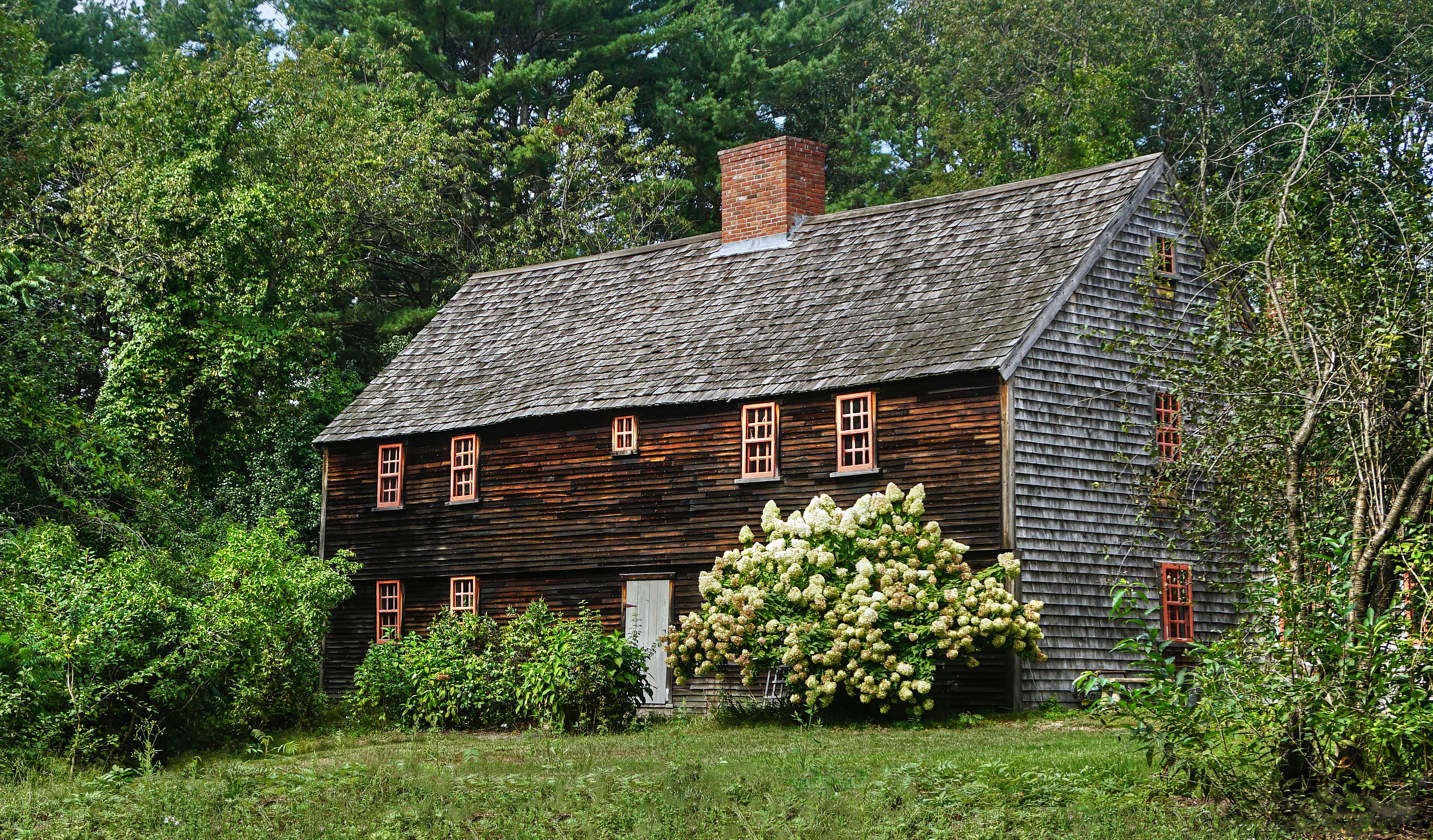
The Dickinson–Pillsbury–Witham House

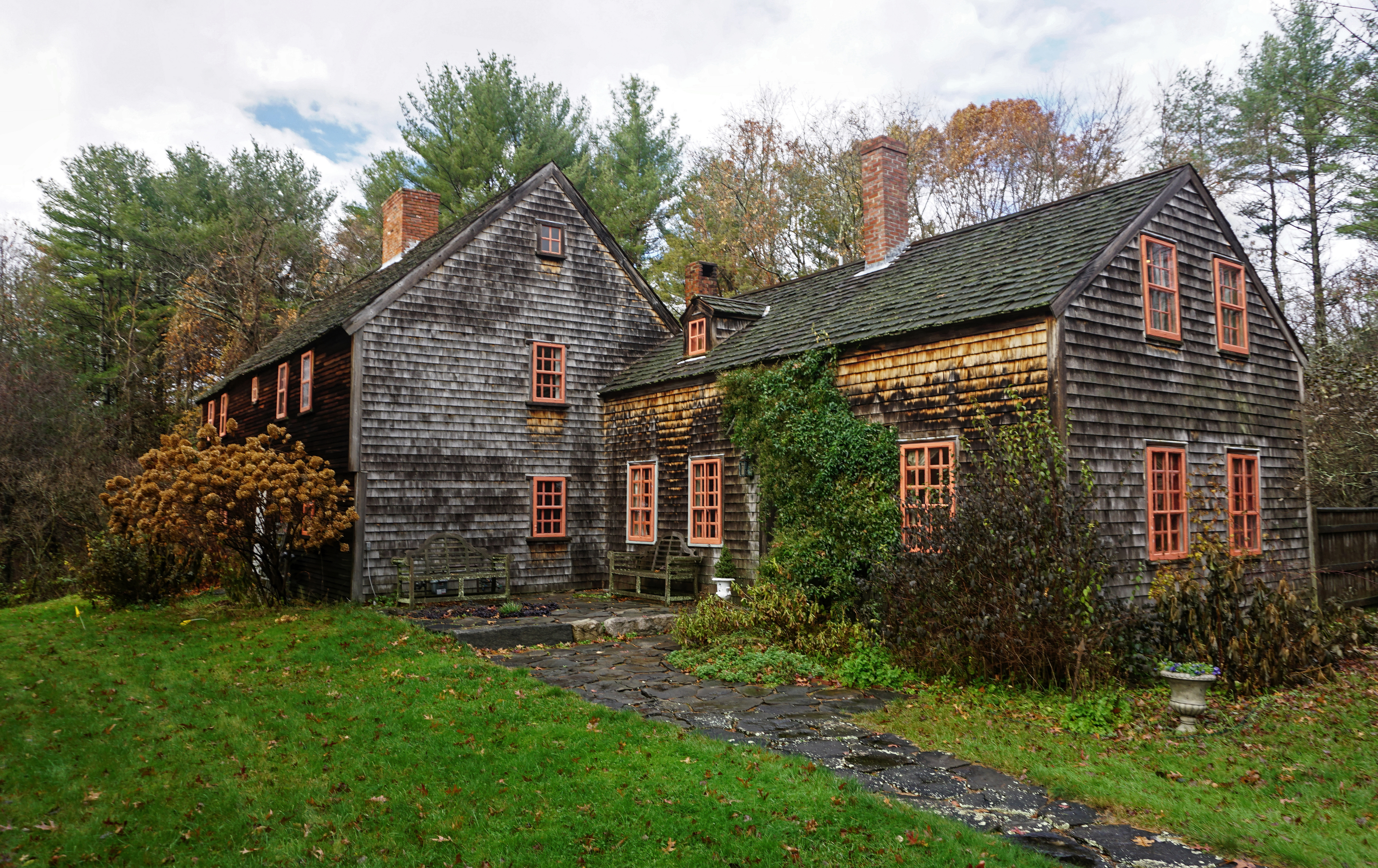
Dickinson House with Pillsbury 1856 knee-wall cape addition

== See also ==
- National Register of Historic Places listings in Essex County, Massachusetts
- List of the oldest buildings in the United States
