= Norfolk County, Massachusetts Colony =

Coordinates: 43°00′00″N 71°00′00″W

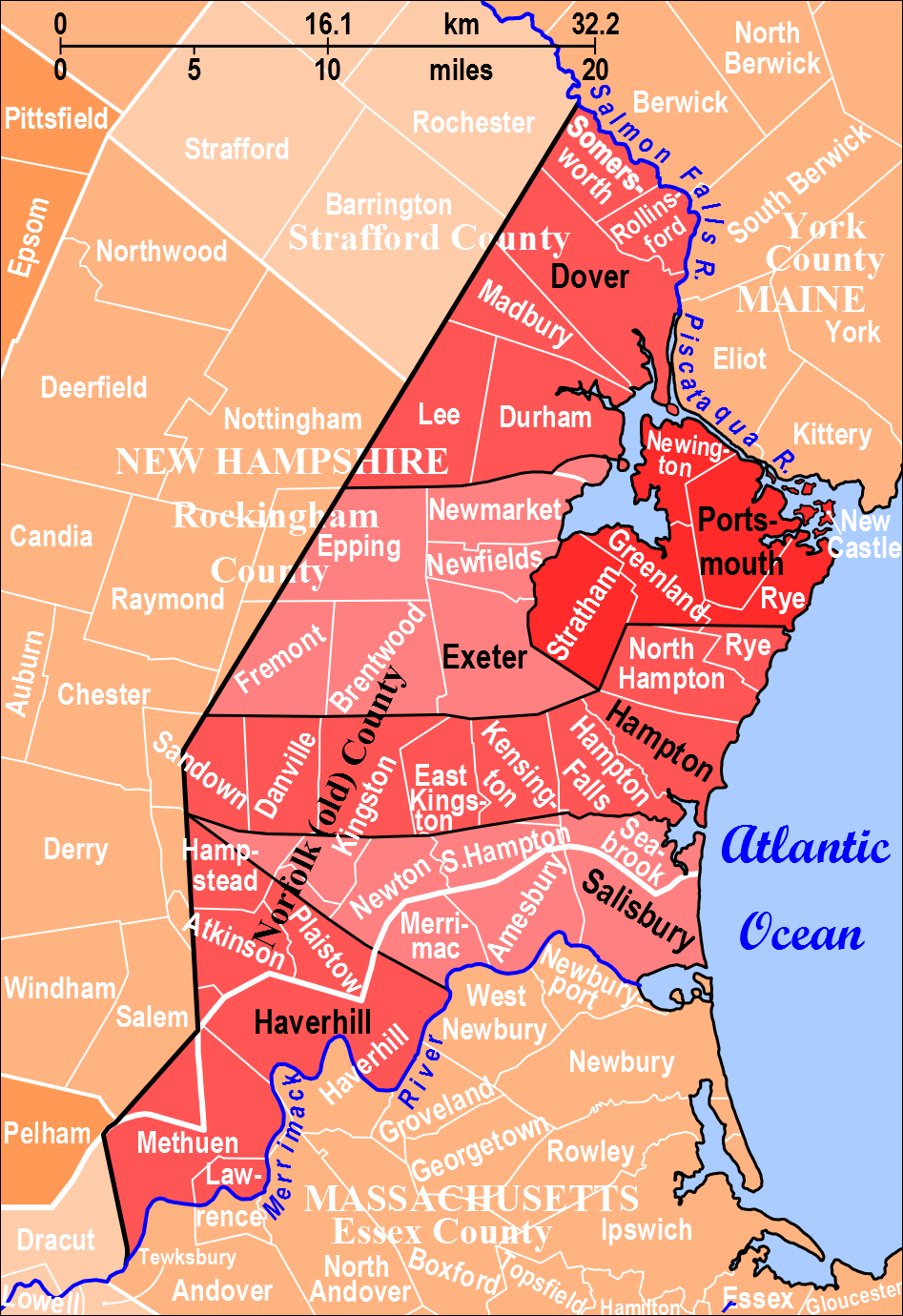
Norfolk County in Massachusetts and New Hampshire (created in 1643 part of Massachusetts Bay Colony) had six towns shown in red and black. This is overlaid on a map of present-day MA and NH town borders in white.

Norfolk County, Massachusetts Colony was one of the original four counties created in the Massachusetts Bay Colony. The land was originally granted as separate from Massachusetts, but boundary disputes among the settlers led to their petitioning to join the colonial government to the south. The county was created by the Massachusetts General Court on May 10, 1643, when it was ordered "that the whole plantation within this jurisdiction be divided into four sheires".

Norfolk County contained the settlements of Salisbury, Hampton, Haverhill, Exeter, Dover, and Portsmouth. It effectively encompassed all settlements from the Merrimack River, north to the Piscataqua River, and extending inland about a dozen miles. In 1680, the Province of New Hampshire was formally separated from Massachusetts, with Norfolk County forming the core. Massachusetts retained the northern bank of Merrimack River and the towns of Salisbury and Haverhill were added to Essex County. Hampton, Exeter, Dover, and Portsmouth were governed at two levels, town and province/colony, until 1769, when New Hampshire was itself divided into counties, so that Norfolk ceased to exist.

The former Norfolk County is often referred to as "Old Norfolk County."

Four volumes of records of the Old Norfolk County exist and are at the Essex County Registry of Deeds in Salem. They have been electronically imaged into JPG image files but are not yet online. These four record books were also abstracted by Sidney Perley in The Essex Antiquarian. This magazine (published 1897 to 1911) has also been electronically imaged and some volumes are available at Google Books.

A new, unrelated county was established as Norfolk County, Massachusetts from most of the southern portion of Suffolk County in 1793.
