= Georgetown, Massachusetts =

Town in Massachusetts, United States

- Town
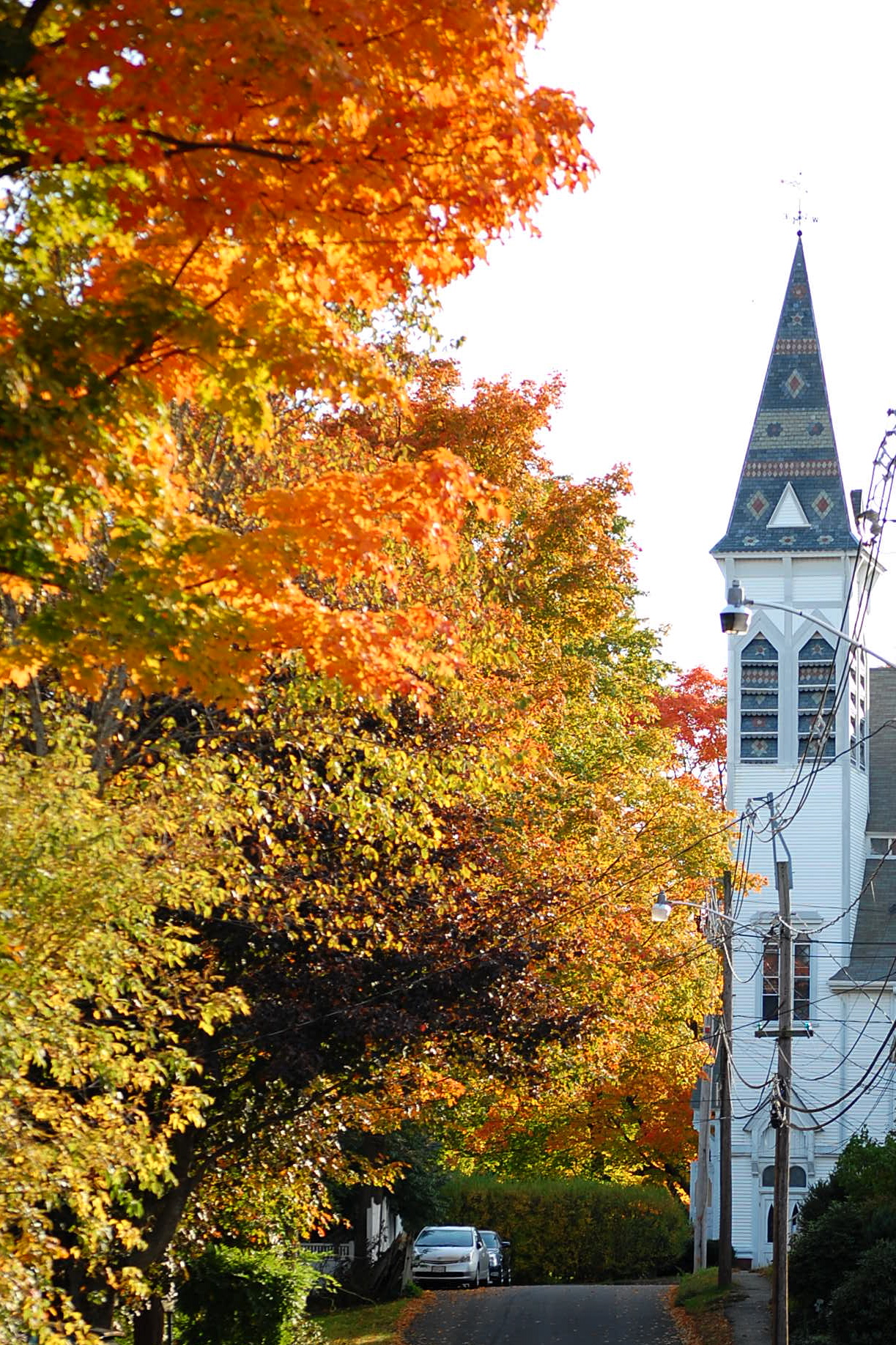
- Spire of the First Congregational Church in Georgetown

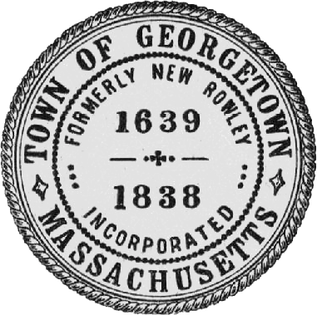
- Seal
- Nickname: New Rowley (former official name)
- Location in Essex County and the Commonwealth of Massachusetts.
- Coordinates: 42°43′30″N 70°59′30″W
- Country: United States
- State: Massachusetts
- County: Essex
- Settled (as New Rowley): 1639
- Incorporated: 1838

Government
  - Type: Open town meeting
  - Town Administrator: Orlando Pacheco

Area
  - Total: 13.2 sq mi (34.1 km^{2})
  - Land: 12.9 sq mi (33.3 km^{2})
  - Water: 0.31 sq mi (0.8 km^{2})
- Elevation: 79 ft (24 m)

Population (2020)
  - Total: 8,470
  - Density: 659/sq mi (254/km^{2})
- Time zone: UTC−5 (Eastern)
  - Summer (DST): UTC−4 (Eastern)
- ZIP Code: 01833
- Area code: 351/978
- FIPS code: 25-25625
- GNIS feature ID: 0619445
- Website: www.georgetownma.gov

Georgetown is a town in Essex County, Massachusetts, United States. The population was 8,470 at the 2020 census. It was incorporated in 1838 from part of Rowley.

== History ==
Georgetown was originally settled in 1639 as a part of the town of Rowley by the Reverend Ezekiel Rogers. The town at the time stretched from the Atlantic coast to the Merrimack River, south of Newbury and north of Ipswich. Several farmers, finding suitable meadowlands in the western half of the settlement, began settling along the Penn Brook by the middle of the seventeenth century, creating Rowley's West Parish. Though not directly involved in King Philip's War, the village nonetheless did become a victim of Indian raids. The village, which became known as New Rowley, grew for many years, with small mills and eventually a shoe company opening up in the town. By 1838, the town was sufficiently large enough for its own incorporation, and was renamed Georgetown. Small industry continued, and today the town is mostly residential in nature, a distant suburb of Boston's North Shore.

== Geography ==
According to the United States Census Bureau, the town has a total area of 13.2 square miles (34.1 km^{2}), of which 12.9 square miles (33.3 km^{2}) is land and 0.31 square miles (0.8 km^{2}), or 2.20%, is water. Georgetown is located on the edge of the hills and coastal plain of northeastern Massachusetts. It has many streams and brooks, as well as two major ponds, Rock Pond and Pentucket Pond. The town has several areas of protected land, including the Georgetown-Rowley State Forest to the south, the Crane Pond Wildlife Management Area to the north, the Lufkins Brook Area to the west, and a small portion of the Boxford State Forest in the southwest.

Georgetown is located approximately 10 miles (16 km) east of Lawrence, 11 miles (18 km) south-southwest of Newburyport, and 28 miles (45 km) north of Boston, north of the center of Essex County. It is bordered by Groveland to the northwest, Newbury to the northeast, Rowley to the southeast, and Boxford to the southwest. Interstate 95 crosses through the eastern half of town, with one exit within the town, at Route 133. Route 133 crosses from east to west through town, with Route 97 crossing from northwest to south. Both state routes share a short stretch of road near the town center. The town has no mass transit; the nearest rail service can be found along the Newburyport/Rockport Line of the MBTA Commuter Rail in Rowley. The nearest air service is at Logan International Airport.

== Demographics ==
Historical population
Year	Pop.	±%
1850	2,052	—
1860	2,075	+1.1%
1870	2,088	+0.6%
1880	2,231	+6.8%
1890	2,117	−5.1%
1900	1,663	−21.4%
1910	1,621	−2.5%
1920	1,478	−8.8%
1930	1,853	+25.4%
1940	1,803	−2.7%
1950	2,411	+33.7%
1960	3,755	+55.7%
1970	5,290	+40.9%
1980	5,687	+7.5%
1990	6,384	+12.3%
2000	7,377	+15.6%
2010	8,183	+10.9%
2020	8,470	+3.5%
2022*	8,408	−0.7%
* = population estimate. Source: United States census records and Population Estimates Program data.

As of the census of 2010, there were 8,183 people, 2,937 households, and 2,290 families residing in the town. The population density was 619.9 inhabitants per square mile (239.3/km^{2}). There were 3,044 housing units at an average density of 230.6 per square mile (89.0/km^{2}). The racial makeup of the town was 96.9% White, 0.5% Black or African American, 0.2% American Indian and Alaska Native, 0.9% Asian, 0.3% from other races, and 1.2% from two or more races. Hispanic or Latino of any race were 1.7% of the population.

There were 2,937 households, out of which 40.9% had children under the age of 18 living with them, 66.9% were married families, 3.1% had a male householder with no wife present, 8.0% had a female householder with no husband present, and 22.0% were non-families. Of all households, 17.8% were made up of individuals, and 7.7% had someone living alone who was 65 years of age or older. The average household size was 2.78 and the average family size was 3.18.

In the town, the population was spread out, with 27.0% under the age of 18, 5.4% from 18 to 24, 23.4% from 25 to 44, 33.0% from 45 to 64, and 11.3% who were 65 years of age or older. The median age was 41.8 years. For every 100 females, there were 97.5 males. For every 100 females age 18 and over, there were 93.8 males.

According to the 2010 census the median income for a household in the town was $108,137, and in 2008 the median income for a family was $79,649. Males had a median income of $58,806 versus $36,108 for females. The per capita income for the town was $28,846. About 2.7% of families and 4.2% of the population were below the poverty line, including 3.8% of those under age 18 and 5.5% of those age 65 or over.

== Government ==
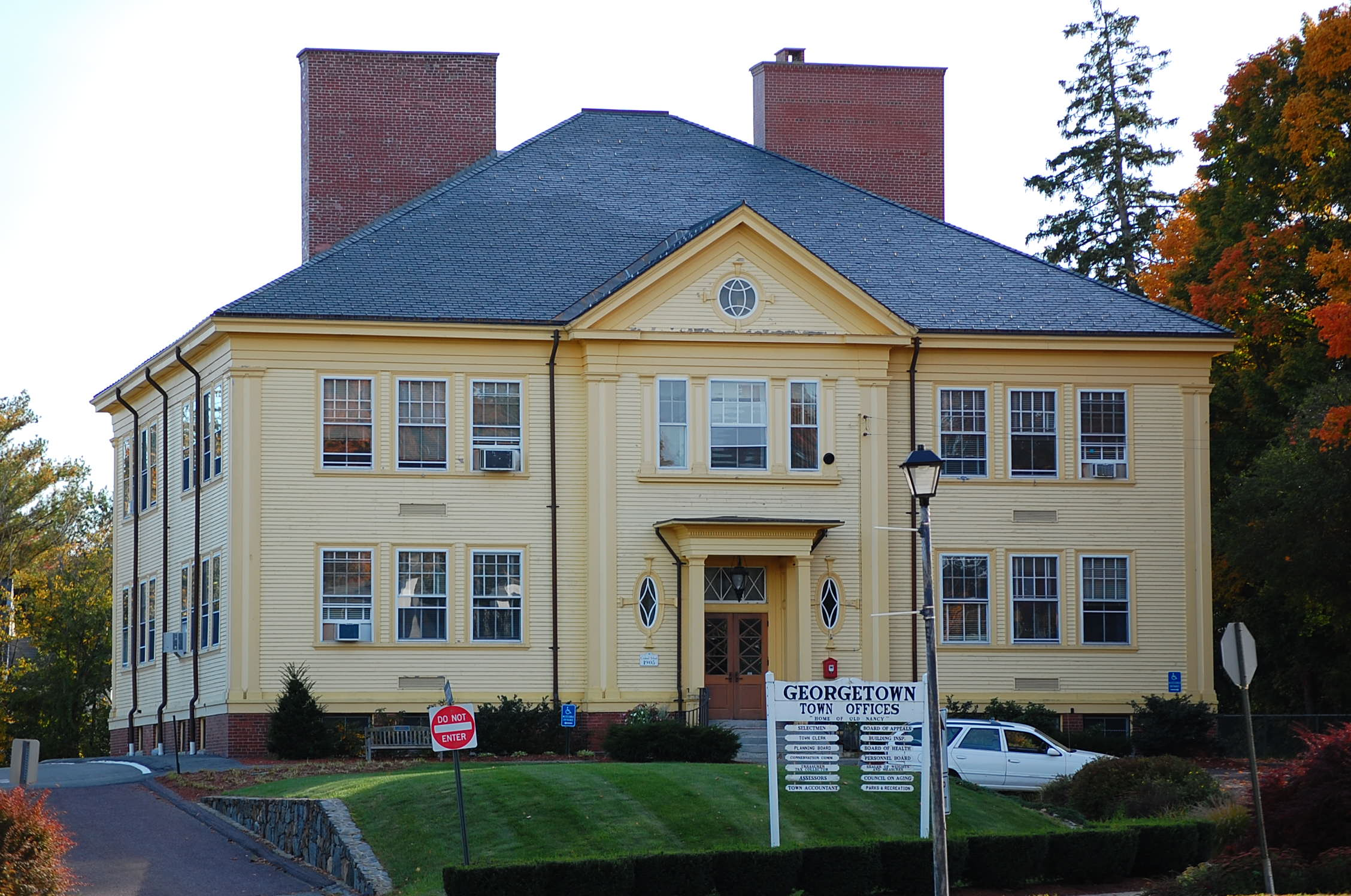
Town offices

Georgetown employs the open town meeting form of government, and is led by a board of selectmen and a town administrator. The current board of selectmen consist of Amy Smith (chair), Douglas Dawes, Daryle J. LaMonica, Rachel Bancroft, and Robert Hoover (Clerk). Georgetown has its own police department, two fire stations (Central Station in downtown and Erie Station in the Northern sector of town), a post office, library, electric department and highway department. The nearest hospitals to the town are in Haverhill, Newburyport and Beverly.

On the state level, Georgetown is under the jurisdiction of the Central District Court of Essex County, located in Haverhill. It is patrolled by the Newbury barracks of Troop A of the Massachusetts State Police. In state government, Georgetown is part of the Second and Eighteenth Essex Districts in the Massachusetts House of Representatives, and is part of the First Essex and Middlesex District in the Massachusetts Senate. On the national level, Georgetown is in Massachusetts's 6th congressional district, and has been represented since 2015 by Seth Moulton (D). In the United States Senate, Massachusetts's senior senator, elected in 2012, is Elizabeth Warren (D), and its junior senator, elected in 2013, is Edward Markey (D).

== Education ==
Georgetown, unlike its neighboring municipalities, has its own municipal school district, and is not part of a regional school association or district. Georgetown has two (formerly three) schools:

- Penn Brook Elementary School is an elementary school on Elm Street in Georgetown for grades preschool–5.
- Georgetown Middle-High School is the only high school/middle school in the town and serves grades 6–12.

Georgetown High School's colors are royal blue and white, and its team name is the Royals, with a mounted knight as its mascot. They compete in the Small School division of the Cape Ann League, and have a Thanksgiving Day football rivalry with Manchester-Essex Regional High School. In addition to GHS, high school students may also attend Whittier Regional Vocational Technical High School in Haverhill, which serves as the eastern Merrimack Valley's vocational school. Private schools are also located throughout the area, the nearest being The Governor's Academy in Newbury.

== Points of interest ==
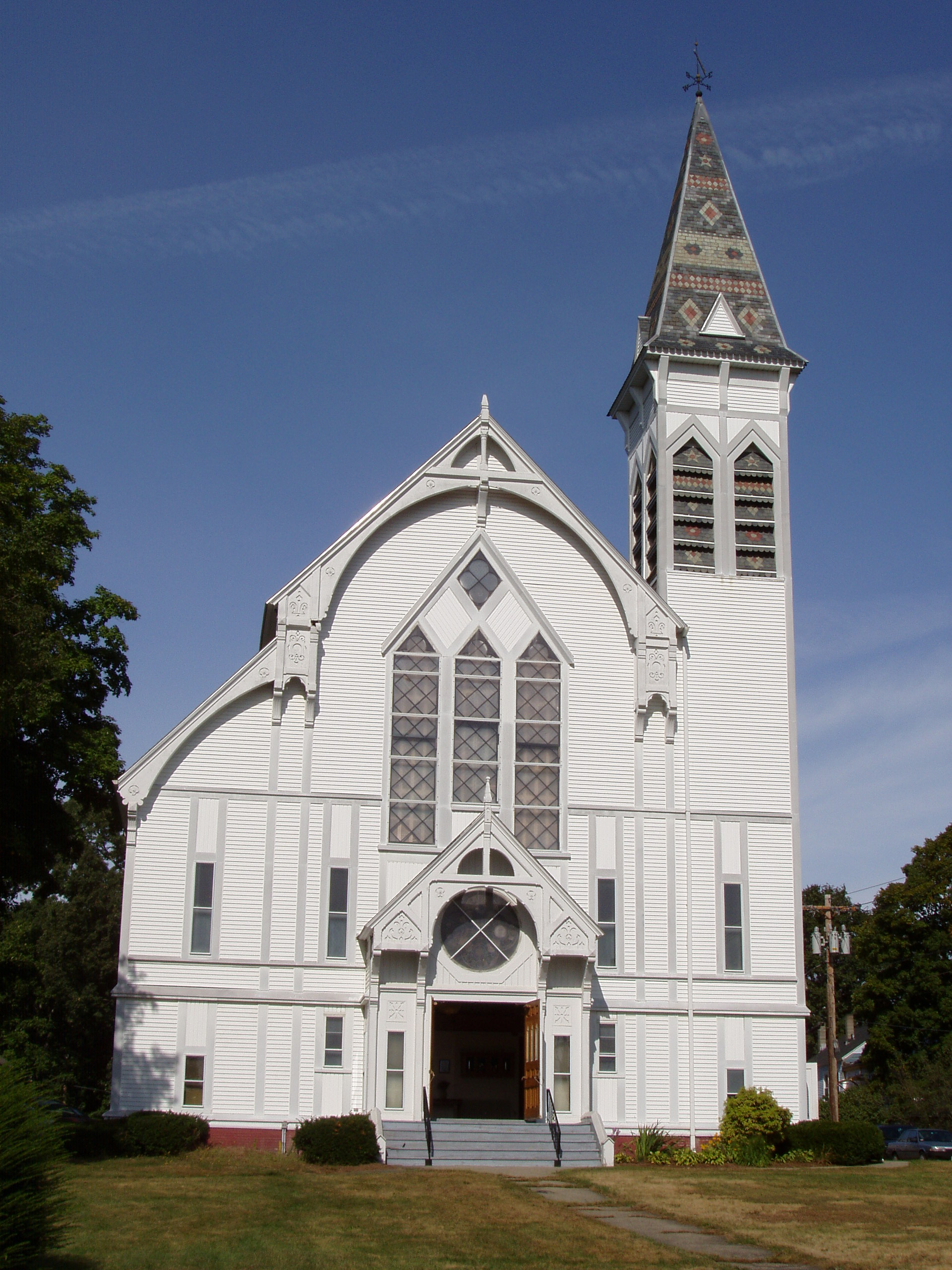
Front view of the First Congregational Church, designed by Peabody & Stearns

- Brocklebank–Nelson–Beecher House
- Dickinson–Pillsbury–Witham House
- Adams–Clarke House
- Georgetown Central School Memorial Town Hall
- Erie 4 Fire Company is the oldest privately owned and operated volunteer fire company in America.
- Georgetown-Rowley State Forest
- Goodrich Massacre Site
- The "Old Nancy" cannon, a relic of the Revolutionary War, may be viewed at the Town Hall.
- Union Cemetery. Cuffee Dole, an African-American man, was buried on the outskirts of the cemetery, but as it grew his plot became more centrally located.
- Georgetown Peabody Library is the town's only public library and named for the noted philanthropist George Peabody who provided the funds to build the library to honor his mother. Peabody provided the funds necessary for the building of the Peabody Institute Libraries in Danvers and Peabody, as well Georgetown (Washington, D.C.), Baltimore, Thetford, Austin and others. He funded the establishment of the Peabody Museums at Harvard and Yale and in Salem. The Georgetown Peabody Library finished an addition and renovation in September 2007.

== Notable people ==
- Matt Antonelli, former MLB player
- Bill Chisholm, founder of Symphony Technology Group (STG), majority owner of the Boston Celtics
- Pat Freiermuth, Pittsburgh Steelers tight end
- Charles Beecher, American minister, composer of religious hymns, and prolific author, preached in Georgetown and died in Georgetown as well
- Jeremiah Chaplin, theologian
- Paul Harding, best known for his debut novel Tinkers (2009), which won the 2010 Pulitzer Prize for Fiction
- William Dutton Hayward, founder of Hayward, California
- Charlotte Nichols Saunders Horner (1823–1906), botanist and plant collector
- Oliver Waterman Larkin, author, winner of 1950 Pulitzer Prize in history for Art and Life in America
- Terry O'Reilly, Boston Bruins hockey player, long time Georgetown resident
- David Pingree (1795–1863), a merchant and landowner
- Brian St. Pierre, former standout quarterback at St. John's Preparatory School and Boston College. He played in the NFL from 2003 to 2010 and is now the head coach at his high school alma mater (St. John's)
- Fred Tenney, baseball player and manager born in Georgetown, buried in Harmony Cemetery
- Jenny Thompson, U.S. Olympic swimming star, lived in town from 1974 to the early 1980s
- Raymond H. Torrey, journalist and hiking pioneer
- John Updike, novelist, resided at 58 West Main Street from 1976 to 1982. His jogs through Georgetown provided backdrop for his 1981 novel Rabbit Is Rich, which won him the National Book Critics Circle Award, the National Book Award and the Pulitzer Prize for Fiction

== In popular culture ==
- Georgetown served as the filming location for Diane English's movie The Women (2008). The movie starred numerous Hollywood leading ladies, including Eva Mendes, Meg Ryan, Carrie Fisher, Annette Bening, Jada Pinkett Smith, Candice Bergen, Bette Midler and Debra Messing. The primary filming location was at Camp Leslie, along the shore of Pentucket Pond.
