= Adams–Clarke House =

Historic house in Massachusetts, United States

- U.S. National Register of Historic Places
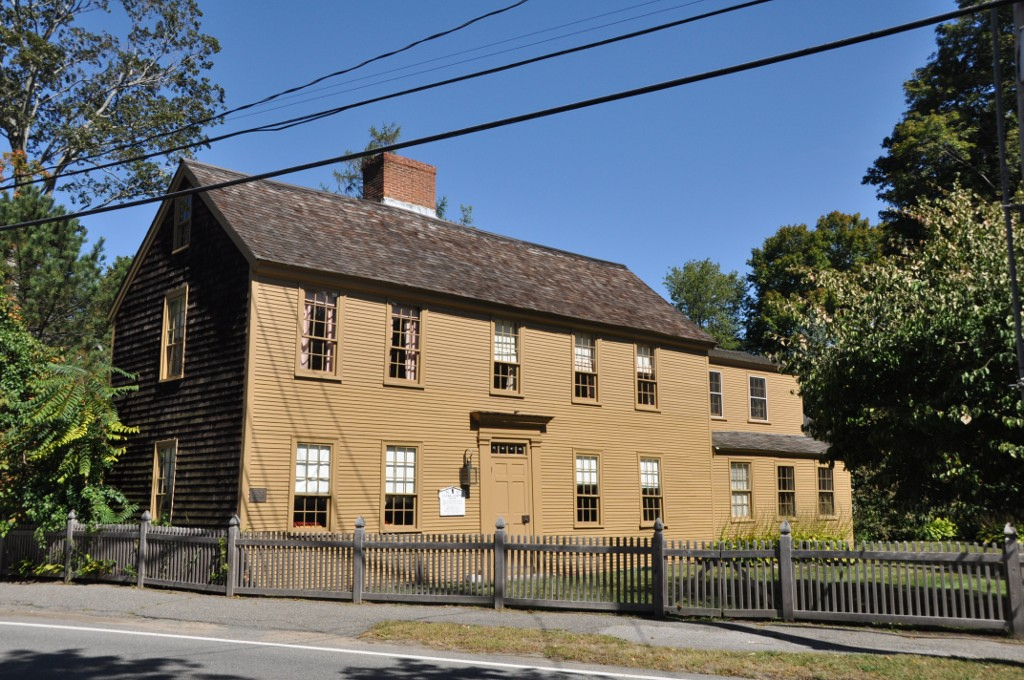

- Location within Massachusetts Location within the United States
- Location: 93 W. Main St., Georgetown, Massachusetts
- Coordinates: 42°43′42″N 70°59′43″W
- Built: 1725
- Architectural style: Colonial
- MPS: First Period Buildings of Eastern Massachusetts TR
- NRHP reference No.: 90000211
- Added to NRHP: March 9, 1990

The Adams–Clarke House is a historic late First Period house in Georgetown, Massachusetts. Built about 1725, it retains a number of features transitional between the First and Second periods of colonial architecture. It was listed on the National Register of Historic Places in 1990.

== Description and history ==
The Adams–Clarke House is located northwest of Georgetown center, on the north side of West Main Street (Massachusetts Route 97) between Pentucket and Weston Avenues. It is oriented facing nearly directly south, placing it at an unusual angle to the street, which runs roughly northwest. It is a 2 1/2-story wood-frame structure, with a side-gable roof, central chimney, and clapboarded exterior. Its main facade is five bays wide, with a Federal-style central entrance flanked by pilasters and topped by a four-light transom and corniced entablature. Windows are 9-over-6 sash, with simple framing. An ell extends to the east side of the building. On the interior, the right side parlor has exposed unchamfered beams, while the left parlor has a Second Period fireplace mantel. The lobby, set between the chimney and the door, includes a winding staircase with feathered sheathing similar to that seen in the right parlor. The addition's interior is Federal in style.

The house was probably built by Isaac Davis sometime after he bought the land in 1716. Its oldest section is the chimney and right side rooms, with the left side rooms added not long afterward. The house exterior was refashioned in Federal style c. 1800, about the time the right-side addition was built. A later 18th-century resident was Benjamin Adams, a militia officer who served in the American Revolutionary War, and represented Rowley in the state legislature.

== See also ==
- National Register of Historic Places listings in Essex County, Massachusetts
