= Rebecca Eames =

- Born: Rebecca Blake; February 1641; Gloucester, Massachusetts Bay Colony
- Died: May 8, 1721 (aged 80); Boxford, Massachusetts Bay Colony
- Spouse: Robert Eames
- Parent(s): George Blake and Dorthy T Blake

Rebecca Blake Eames (February 1, 1641 - May 8, 1721) was among those accused of witchcraft during the Salem witch trials of 1692.

Rebecca Eames was in the crowd at the August 19, 1692, hanging of witches in Salem when she was accused of causing a pinprick in the foot of another spectator. She was arrested. Eames later testified that the devil had appeared to her as a colt and had persuaded her to follow him. She testified that she had allowed her son Daniel (born 1663) to be baptized by the devil. She confessed to afflicting Timothy Swan.

She was examined again on August 31, 1692, by John Hathorne and Jonathan Corwin. She repeated her confession and implication of her son Daniel as a wizard and her confession of afflicting Timothy Swan. She also implicated "Toothaker Widow" [Margaret Toothaker] and Abigail Faulkner as fellow witches.

Mary Walcott, Mary Warren and Ann Putnam Jr. gave testimony on September 15 that they had been afflicted by Rebecca Eames. She was tried and convicted on September 17, with nine others. They were all condemned to die. Four of those nine were executed on September 22. In October, the Court of Oyer and Terminer was dissolved. Rebecca Eames remained in Salem prison. On December 5, she submitted a petition to Governor Phips retracting her "false and untrue" confession, saying she had been "hurried out of my Senses" by Abigail Hobbs and Mary Lacey who had said she would be hanged if she did not confess. Her husband, Robert Eames, died on July 22, 1693, four months after his wife's release from prison.

== Life ==
Born in February 1641 in Gloucester, Massachusetts, she married Robert Eames, an immigrant from England, in 1661 in Andover, Massachusetts. She died on May 8, 1721, in Boxford, Massachusetts.

Children:

- Hannah Eames (December 18, 1661 – July 8, 1731, at Andover, Essex, Massachusetts)
- Daniel Eames (April 7, 1663 – after 1695) (Note: Daniel Eames and his wife, Lydia Wheeler Eames, were also accused but survived the trials.)
- Robert Eames (February 28, 1667/68 – after 1698)
- John Eames (October 11, 1670 – July 24, 1726, at Groton, Middlesex, Massachusetts)
- Dorothy Eames (born December 20, 1674)
- Jacob Eames (July 20, 1677 – after 1700)
- Joseph Eames (October 9, 1681 – December 27, 1753, at Boxford, Essex, Massachusetts)
- Nathaniel Eames (November 19, 1685 – January 11, 1765, at Boxford, Essex, Massachusetts)
