= Charlotte Nichols Saunders Horner =

American botanist (1823–1906)

- Born: July 5, 1823; Boxford, Massachusetts, U.S.
- Died: July 18, 1906 (aged 83); Georgetown, Massachusetts, U.S.
- Other name: Charlotte N. S. Horner
- Occupations: Botanist, plant collector

Signature
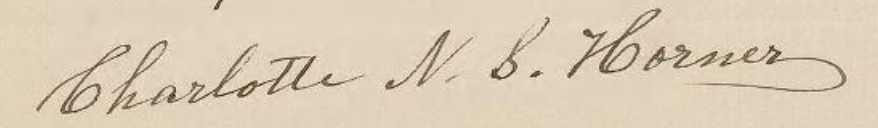

Charlotte Nichols Saunders Horner (July 5, 1823 – July 18, 1906) was an American botanist and plant collector from Massachusetts, focusing on spermatophytes. Horner was the first woman to deliver a scientific presentation to the Massachusetts Horticultural Society.

== Life and career ==
Horner was born on July 5, 1823, in Boxford, Massachusetts, to Mary (née Parker) and Samuel Morse. She received private schooling. She taught at North Andover and Boxford schools from the age of 16 and eventually married a shoemaker and stationmaster named William Spofford Horner, settling in nearby Georgetown, a village north of Boston.

She launched and ran a successful business supplying botanical specimens to Boston-area high schools and possibly to Harvard College to support courses and practical exams. In 1886 alone, she supplied 450 students at two high schools with more than 10,300 specimens of some 80 species and varieties. Her plant business earned her at least $50 in 1885 and $195 in 1893 – a sizable income for the time. When her husband retired after 25 years as a stationmaster, he worked as an agent for a plant nursery and accompanied his wife on collecting trips for both businesses. She closed her botanical supply business in 1898, the same year her husband died.

Horner assembled an extensive herbarium, collecting and classifying specimens from more than 50 towns across 9 states, including one or more species of every known fern genus in the U.S. After William's death, at the age of 75, she spent some weeks in Colorado camping and collecting plants. Of her collections, more than 1,300 specimens are known to exist today, held at the Gray Herbarium, the New England Botanical Society, the Peabody Essex Museum, and other herbaria across the Northeast. The Harvard University Herbaria have digitized 792 of the specimens. As of 2025, at least 148 specimens have been cited in 43 scientific publications.

Horner was recognized among fellow botanists as an expert in New England plants. She received a diploma from the Massachusetts Horticultural Society in 1869, indicating that she may have become a member, and became a Member for Life in 1873. In 1880 she became the first woman to deliver a scientific talk to the Society in its 51 years of existence. She was one of only seven women botanists in the northeastern United States to publish in scientific journals in the 1880s and 1890s. Between 1871 and 1896, Horner received dozens of awards and cash prizes for her displays of hundreds of specimens (flowering plants, ferns, mosses, fungi, vegetables, fruits, and others) at weekly, monthly, and annual exhibitions of the Horticultural Society and the Essex County Agricultural Society. In 1880, she became the first recipient of the Horticultural Society’s silver medal for native plants, winning a second silver medal two years later. She became a member of the Essex Institute in 1895.

Horner died in Georgetown in 1906 at the age of 83. She was interred at Union Cemetery in Georgetown.
