= Georgetown Central School =

- U.S. National Register of Historic Places
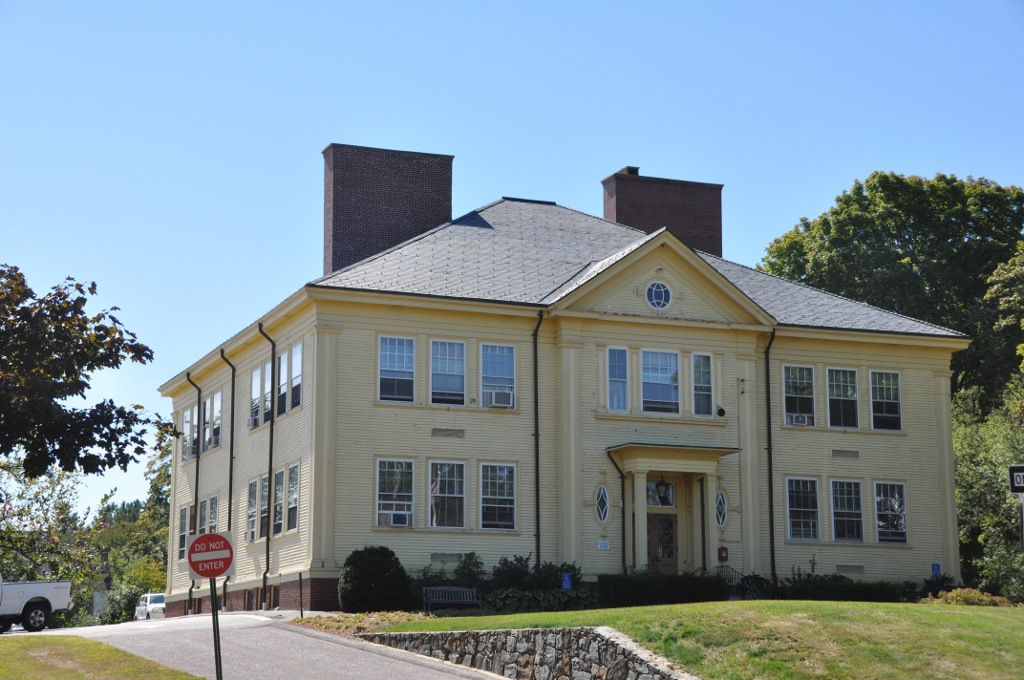

- Location within Massachusetts Location within the United States
- Location: Georgetown, Massachusetts
- Coordinates: 42°43′22″N 70°59′34″W
- Built: 1905
- Architect: Cooper and Bailey
- Architectural style: Colonial Revival
- NRHP reference No.: 01000915
- Added to NRHP: August 30, 2001

Georgetown Central School, or Memorial Town Hall, is a historic school building at 1 Library Street in Georgetown, Massachusetts. The building currently serves as Georgetown's Town Hall. It occupies a prominent location in the town center, and is one of its best Colonial Revival structures.

The two story wood-frame building was built in 1905 to a design by the Boston architectural firm of Cooper and Bailey, and located at the site of an earlier one-room schoolhouse built in the 18th century. It was Georgetown's first multi-room school building, and was built after the town's first high school/town hall burned down in 1898. Its siting, use, and construction were attended by some controversy, The building housed grades 1 through 9 until 1919, when the junior high grades were moved to Perley High School. It continued to serve as an elementary school until the 1970s, by which time modern facilities had been constructed for all grades. In 1974 the building was converted for use as town hall. The building underwent a major restoration in 1999–2000 in which its Colonial Revival details were sensitively restored.

The building is situated on a rise overlooking Library and Central Streets, and is accessed by drives that flank its east and west sides. It is a nearly square building, with nine window bays on the north and south sides, and eight on the east and west elevations. Windows are located symmetrically, and the entrances are centered on the north and south elevations. The main entrance is highlighted by a pedimented porch supported by narrow columns. The hipped roof is made of slate, a replacement of the original done during the 2000 restoration. Two chimney stacks, each a long narrow brick structure, rise above the east and west sides. An elevator head house has been added to the south side of the building. The exterior walls are sheathed with clapboard, with pilastered corner trim and a plain cornice. The interior of the building has been sensitively restored to bring back details that were originally present during its period as a school (as evidenced by historic photographs) and later removed.

The building was listed on the National Register of Historic Places in 2001.

== See also ==
- National Register of Historic Places listings in Essex County, Massachusetts
