= South Bend Lathe =

South Bend Lathe is a brand of machine tools. Today's South Bend Lathe corporation is the successor to the original South Bend Lathe Works, an American machine tool builder that for many decades was one of the most important builders of metalworking lathes in the U.S. and in the world.

The South Bend Lathe Works was established in 1906 in South Bend, Indiana by identical twin brothers John J. O'Brien and Miles W. O'Brien. By 1930, the company was building 47% of the engine lathes sold each year in the United States. In a quarter century, South Bend Lathe Works had become the largest exclusive manufacturer of metalworking precision lathes in the world. In the 1920s through 1960s, South Bend lathes were found in countless machine shops and factories, and they were also one of the most commonly used brands in vocational schools.

The 9-inch lathe was so successful that many other companies made almost direct copies (clones), including the Boxford Lathe Model A in England; Purcell, Demco, and FW Hercus in Australia; Blomqvist and Storebro in Sweden; and Sanches Blanes S.A. in Brazil.

The company made a case study for business-management academics during the mid-1970s when it became employee-owned under an Employee Stock Ownership Plan model.

Later South Bend Lathe became a division of LeBlond Limited, which is part of the Makino corporation, a multinational machine tool–building firm.

In 2009, the brand was sold to Shiraz Balolia, founder of the machinery firms Grizzly Industrial Inc. and Woodstock International Inc.

Under LeBlond, South Bend Lathe produced precision machine tools, although it was not the giant of market share that it was during the 1920s through 1950s. The new owner, Balolia, planned to redevelop and manage the brand as one that appeals to the demand for high-end quality that many South Bend lathe enthusiasts share. A new line of South Bend brand machine tools is now sold through Grizzly dealers. Their niche in the manual-control machine tool market is what marketers sometimes term the "mass luxury" segment of a market, where low-end affordability blends into high-end desirability in a combination that buyers sense highest value. In South Bend Lathe's case, the affordability of machine tools from Taiwan or China mixes with the desirability of certain German and Japanese components (such as spindle bearings) and higher standards (compared to many Taiwanese or Chinese brands) in terms of tolerances, inspection, features, and rigidity.

U.S. Navy ships of different classes have South Bend lathes on board. NASA currently has at least one modern South Bend lathe in their equipment arsenal. The South Bend Lathe factory has been razed. A Notre Dame research facility is at that location.
