= Brocklebank–Nelson–Beecher House =

Building in Georgetown, Massachusetts

Coordinates: 42.7202°N 70.986°W

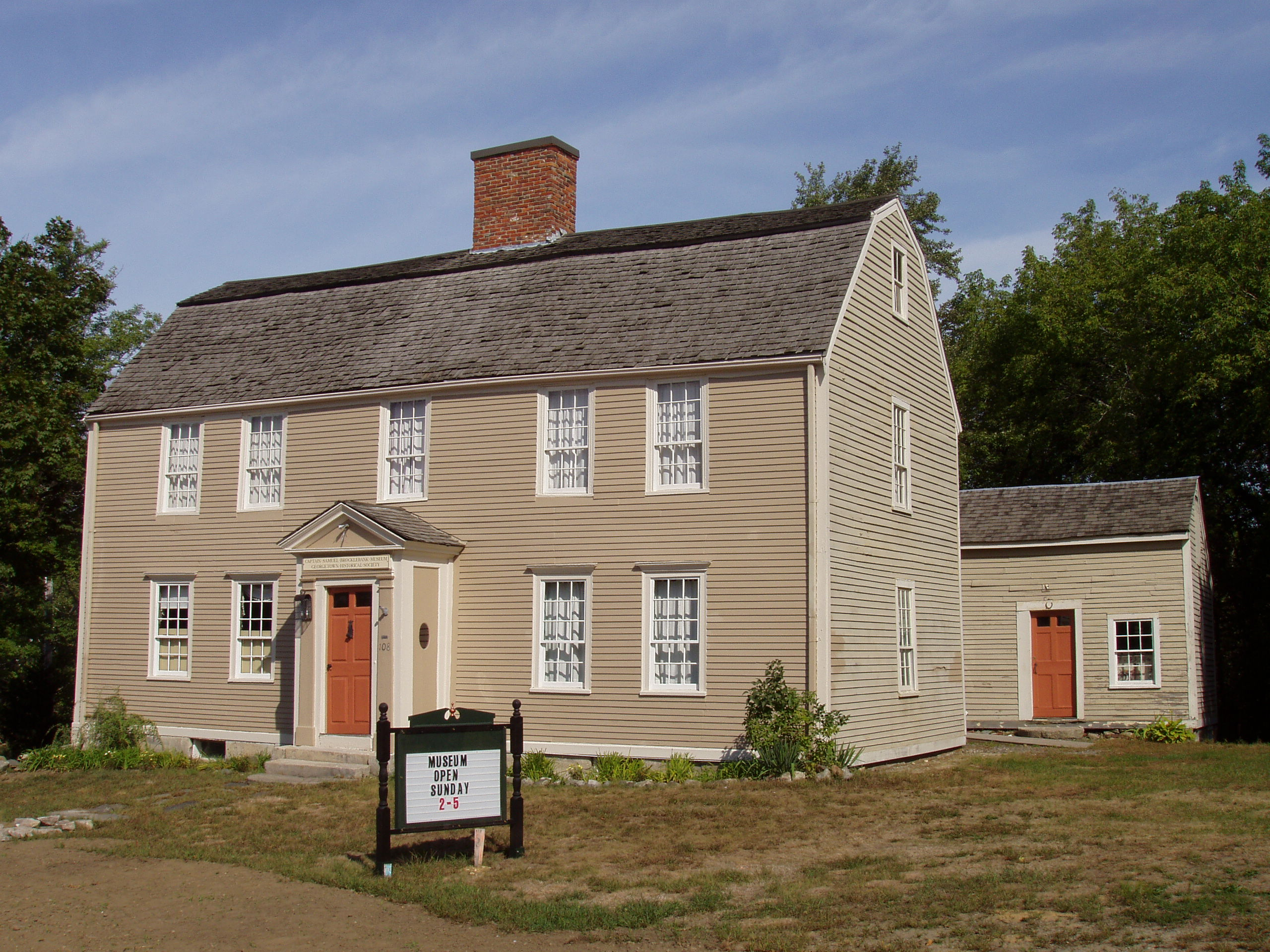
The Brocklebank–Nelson–Beecher House, Georgetown, Massachusetts.

The Brocklebank–Nelson–Beecher House (circa 1668) is a First Period Colonial house located at 108 East Main Street (Route 133), Georgetown, Massachusetts. It is now a nonprofit museum owned by the Georgetown Historical Society. An admission fee is charged.

== History ==
In 1661, the house's land was granted to Captain Samuel Brocklebank, a surveyor who had come from England in 1638. It is believed that Brocklebank built the house shortly after his marriage in 1668, near a brook where he had kept cattle penned previously. Brocklebank, a captain in the militia, was killed with his entire company in Sudbury in 1676 in a skirmish with Indians during King Philip's War. The house remained within the family until 1754, when it was acquired by Dudley Tyler for use as a tavern, which use continued under Solomon Nelson who purchased the property in 1767. In 1858 the house was bought by Rev Charles Beecher, brother of Harriet Beecher Stowe and Henry Ward Beecher. In 1880 the house was purchased by M. G. Spofford and in 1931 by furniture manufacturer Everett Spaulding, a tenth generation Brocklebank descendant who sold the property to the Society in 1975.

== Present description ==
The original house was extended several times in its early years, and is now a gambrel roofed, 5-bay, center chimney dwelling of early eighteenth-century appearance. A number of items are exhibited within, including many of Capt. Brocklebank's journals. There are also many historically accurate pieces within as well as a display of a small back yard shoe shop.
