= Holyoke–French House =

Historic house in Massachusetts, United States

- U.S. National Register of Historic Places
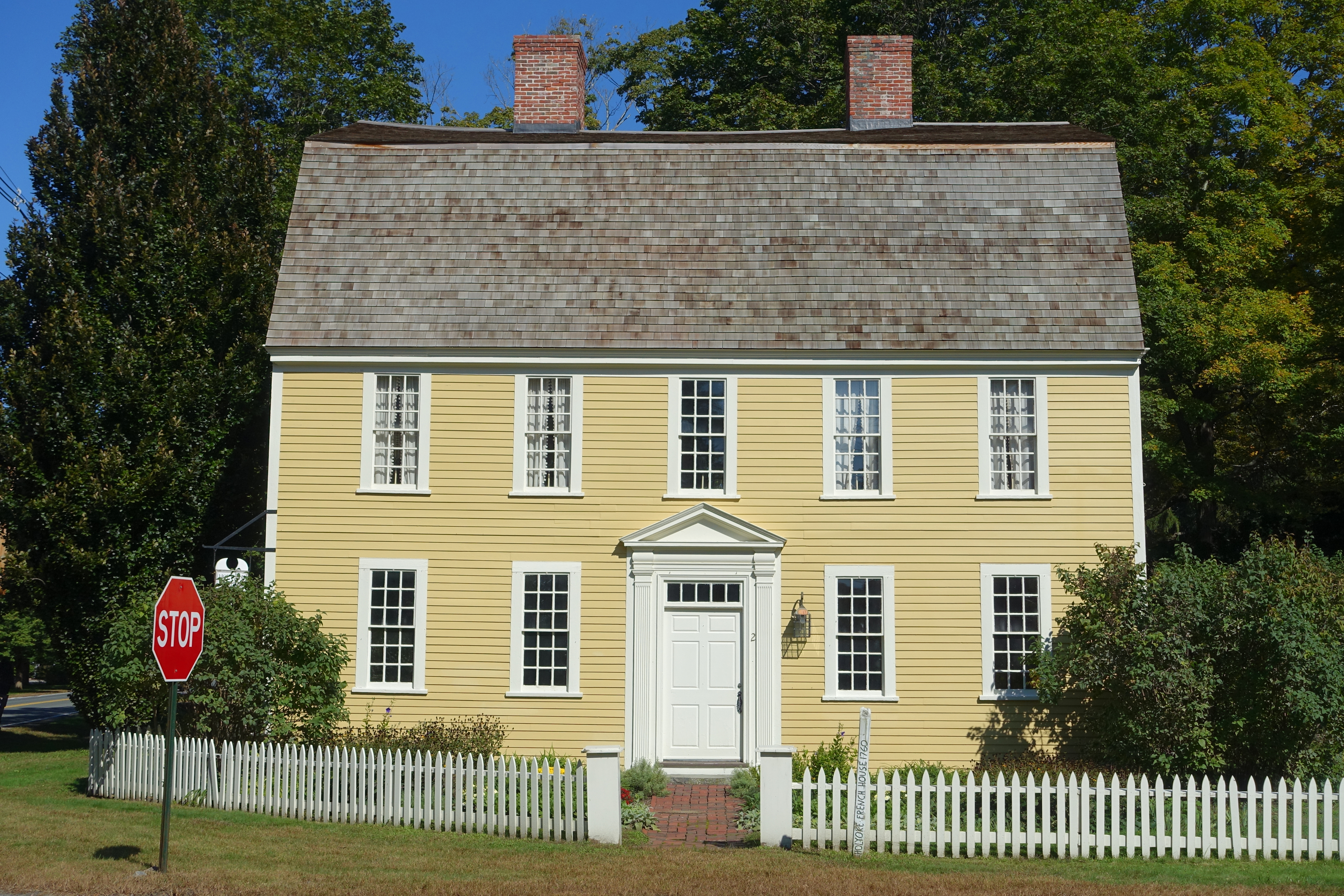
- Location: Elm St. and Topsfield Rd. Boxford, Massachusetts
- Coordinates: 42.661°N 70.99721°W
- NRHP reference No.: 72000123
- Added to NRHP: April 26, 1972

The Holyoke–French House is a historical house at Elm Street and Topsfield Road in Boxford, Massachusetts. It is a 2 1/2-story wood-frame structure, with a side-gable gambrel roof, twin interior chimneys, clapboard siding, and a stone foundation. The center entrance is flanked by pilasters and is topped by a transom window and a gabled pediment.

The first house on this site was built c. 1704 as a parsonage for Boxford's first preacher, Thomas Symmes. The present house was built in 1760 for the third minister, Elizur Holyoke. This house (as the name suggests) is known for two of the families that resided there, the Holyokes and the Frenches. This house is now owned by the Boxford Historical Society.

== See also ==
- National Register of Historic Places listings in Essex County, Massachusetts
- List of the oldest buildings in Massachusetts
