= Boxford (CDP), Massachusetts =

Boxford, Massachusetts
- Census-designated place
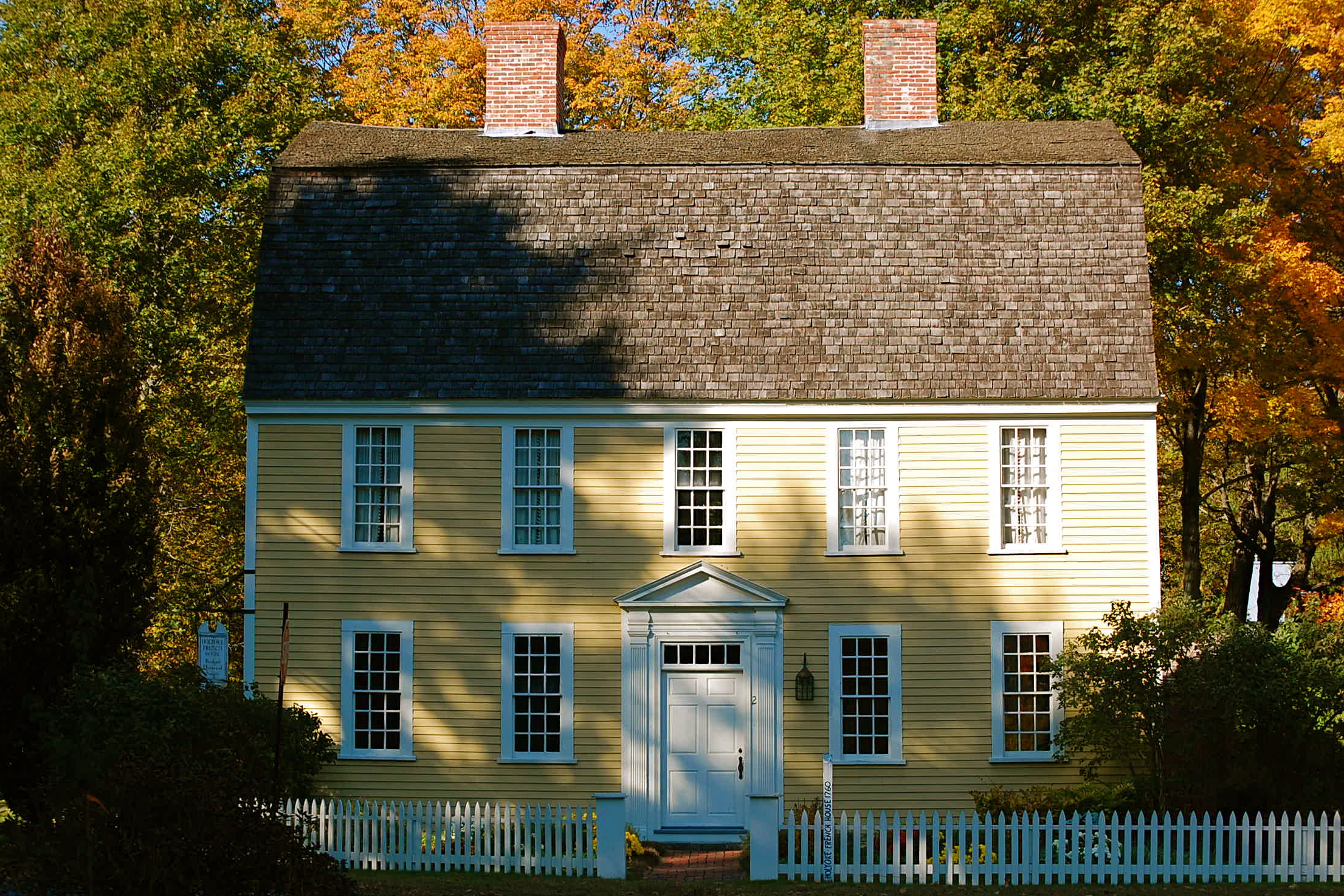
- Holyoke French House

- Location in Essex County and the state of Massachusetts.
- Coordinates: 42°40′25″N 70°59′10″W
- Country: United States
- State: Massachusetts
- County: Essex
- Town: Boxford

Area
  - Total: 5.47 sq mi (14.18 km^{2})
  - Land: 5.36 sq mi (13.89 km^{2})
  - Water: 0.11 sq mi (0.28 km^{2})
- Elevation: 102 ft (31 m)

Population (2020)
  - Total: 2,432
  - Density: 453.4/sq mi (175.05/km^{2})
- Time zone: UTC-5 (Eastern (EST))
  - Summer (DST): UTC-4 (EDT)
- ZIP code: 01921
- Area code: 978
- FIPS code: 25-07385
- GNIS feature ID: 0614204

Boxford is a census-designated place (CDP) in the town of Boxford in Essex County, Massachusetts, United States. The population was 2,339 at the 2010 census.

== Geography ==
According to the United States Census Bureau, the CDP has a total area of 5.5 square miles (14.2 km^{2}), of which 5.4 square miles (13.9 km^{2}) is land and 0.12 square miles (0.3 km^{2}) (1.99%) is water.

== Demographics ==
Historical population
Census	Pop.	Note	%±
2020	2,432		—
U.S. Decennial Census

As of the census of 2000, there were 2,340 people, 756 households, and 674 families residing in the CDP. The population density was 164.0 people/km^{2} (425 people/mi^{2}). There were 765 housing units at an average density of 53.6 units per square kilometre (139 units/mi^{2}). The racial makeup of the CDP was 96.84% White, 0.34% African American, 1.37% Asian, 0.00% Pacific Islander, 0.47% from other races, and 0.98% from two or more races. 0.98% of the population were Hispanic or Latino of any race.

There were 756 households, out of which 47.4% had children under the age of 18 living with them, 80.4% were married couples living together, 6.6% have a woman whose husband does not live with her, and 10.8% were non-families. 7.9% of all households were made up of individuals, and 3.2% had someone living alone who was 65 years of age or older. The average household size was 3.10 and the average family size was 3.29.

In the CDP, the population was spread out, with 31.3% under the age of 18, 4.1% from 18 to 24, 26.2% from 25 to 44, 27.5% from 45 to 64, and 10.9% who were 65 years of age or older. The median age was 40 years. For every 100 females, there were 99.5 males. For every 100 females age 18 and over, there were 95.1 males.

The median income for a household in the CDP was $108,778, and the median income for a family was $116,810. Males had a median income of $72,426 versus $38,073 for females. The per capita income for the CDP was $51,977. None of the families and 1.0% of the population were below the poverty line. Out of the total people living in poverty, 0.0% are under the age of 18 and 5.1% are 65 or older.
