= Sidney Perley =

American poet

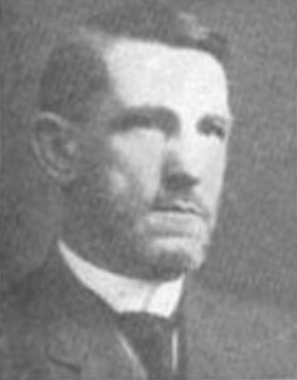
- Born: March 6, 1858; Boxford, Massachusetts
- Died: June 9, 1928 (aged 70); Boston, Massachusetts
- Education: Boston University School of Law
- Occupations: Lawyer, writer
- Spouse: Harriet Hood Spofford (m. 1889)
- Children: 2

Sidney Perley (1858–1928) was an American lawyer, writer, poet, editor, and historian.

== Early life ==
Sidney Perley, son of Humphrey and Eunice Perley, was born in Boxford, Massachusetts on March 6, 1858.

He went to school in Boxford and subsequently studied law at the Boston University School of Law, graduating with an LL. B. in 1886. On July 20, 1880, he was admitted to practice in the courts of Boston. The following September, he began his professional career in Salem.

== As a historian ==
Since childhood, Perley had studied history and genealogy, and his History of Boxford was published when he was 21. He was a founder and editor of the Essex Antiquarian, a quarterly magazine devoted to the genealogy, biography, history, and antiquities of Essex County.

From 1877, Perley was a member of the New England Historic Genealogical Society, and was also a member of the Essex Institute and various other professional and literary organizations.

== Politics and official positions ==
From 1881 to 1886, he was the town auditor of Boxford. From 1900 to 1903, he was a member of the school committee of the city of Salem.

He was a Republican, and supported prohibition. At one point he was a key figure in the Prohibition Party in Essex County, and stood as its candidate for the office of attorney-general of Massachusetts, member of the governor's council, clerk of courts and Senator.

== Personal life ==
On June 11, 1889, Sidney Perley married Harriet Hood Spofford, who was (born December 10, 1861). They had two children: Eleanor Spofford (born October 9, 1894) and Richard Hood (born October 17, 1898).

Sidney Perley died in Boston on June 9, 1928, soon after the publication of his 3 volume History of Salem, Massachusetts.

== Works ==
- Perley, Sidney. History of Boxford, Essex County, Massachusetts. Full images at books.google.Published 1880.
- Perley, Sidney. Historic Storms of New England: Its Gales, Hurricanes, Tornadoes, Etc. Published 1891.
- Perley, Sidney. Mortuary Law. Published by George B. Reed, Law Publisher 1896.
- Perley, Sidney. Poets of Essex County Massachusetts. Published 1889.
- Perley, Sidney. Essex Antiquarian,Volume 1, 1897.
- Perley, Sidney. Essex Antiquarian,Volume 3, 1899. Full images at books.google.
- Perley, Sidney. Essex Antiquarian,Volume 8, 1909.
- Perley, Sidney. N.E.Historical Genealogical Register. Volume 62,1908.page 51, Obituary of Alfred Poore 1818-1907.
- Perley, Sidney. The Indian Land Titles of Essex County, Massachusetts. Published 1912.
- Perley, Sidney. History of Salem, Massachusetts in Three Volumes. Full images at University of Virginia eText Center and the Salem Witch Trial Documentary Archive and Transcription Project.
