= Boxford Lathe =

Brand of machine tool

Boxford Lathe was a brand of lathes produced by Denford Machine Tools from 1946 until 1952. The original factory was in Box Tree Mills, Wheatley, Halifax, West Yorkshire, England. Denford Machine Tools also produced other metalworking tools including precision measuring tools such as an optical comparator. The lathes and other tools were marketed under the name "Box-Ford". The name appears to be a portmanteau of "Box Tree Mills" and the founder's surname, "Denford". In 1952, the founder, Horace Denford, sold the company with Boxfords continuing at Halifax (initially under the ownership of T.S.Harrison and later independently owned) and Denfords in Brighouse.

In December 2011, Boxford Lathes moved from its original home at Box Tree Mills in Halifax to a custom-built new factory in Elland.

As of Autumn 2018, Boxfords are due to relocate their factory, although where is not yet public knowledge, but their current building is now up for sale.

== Boxford Lathe models ==
| Model | Swing | Centre distance | Screw cutting | Cross-feed | Production |
|---|---|---|---|---|---|
| A and AUD | 9 inch | 16 to 24 inch | Gearbox | Power | 1946–1977 |
| B and BUD | 9 inch | 16 to 24 inch | Manual | Power | 1948–1977 |
| C and CUD | 9 inch | 16 to 24 inch | Manual | Manual | 1950–1977 |
| T and TUD | 9 inch | 16 to 24 inch | None | Manual | 1950–1960 |
| VSL | 9 or 10 inch | 16 to 30 inch | Gearbox | Power | 1966–1988 |
| ME10 and ME10A | 10 inch | 22 to 32 inch | Manual or Gearbox | Power | 1976–1988 |

The model A had an optional inch or metric screw-cutting gearbox and power cross-feed. The addition of the letters, "UD" to the model letter signifies "Under Drive". Model AUD is a Model A with the Under Drive mount. The four lathes (A, B, C, and T) were dimensionally identical but with different features. Model A was the top of the line with the screw-cutting gearbox. Model B was next with power cross feed and manual gear change for screw cutting. Model C had manual cross-feed and manual gear change for screw cutting. Model T was the Training lathe. The VSL (for late machines, VSL500) was an AUD with infinitely-variable spindle speed control, larger bore through spindle, 'L00' fitting for chucks instead of the threaded fitting of the other models and some other uprated features making it more attractive to industry. The lathes were based on the design of the very successful American South Bend Lathe models.
