= Boxford, Massachusetts =

- Town
- Town of Boxford
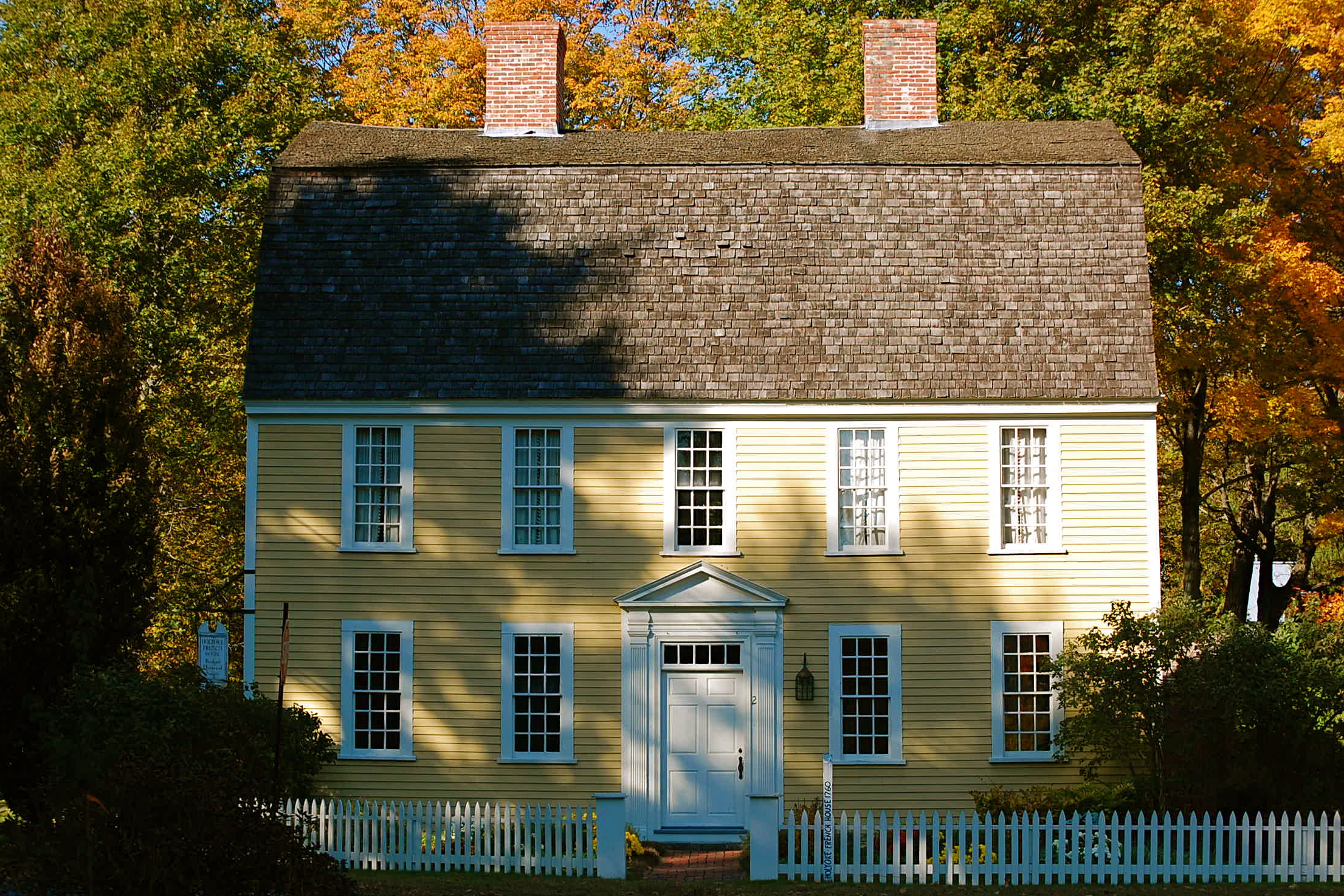
- The Holyoke-French House (c. 1760) in East Boxford Village

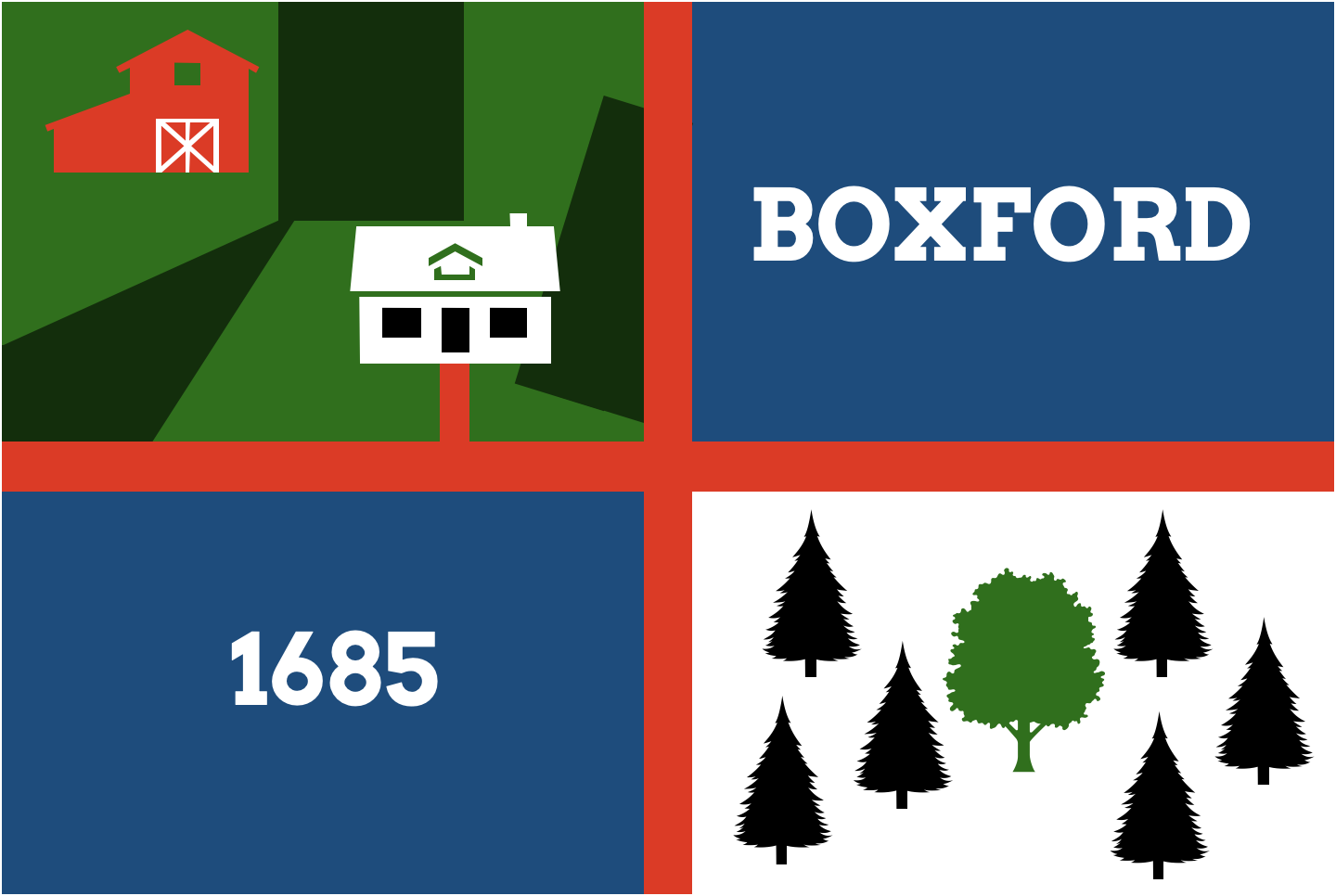
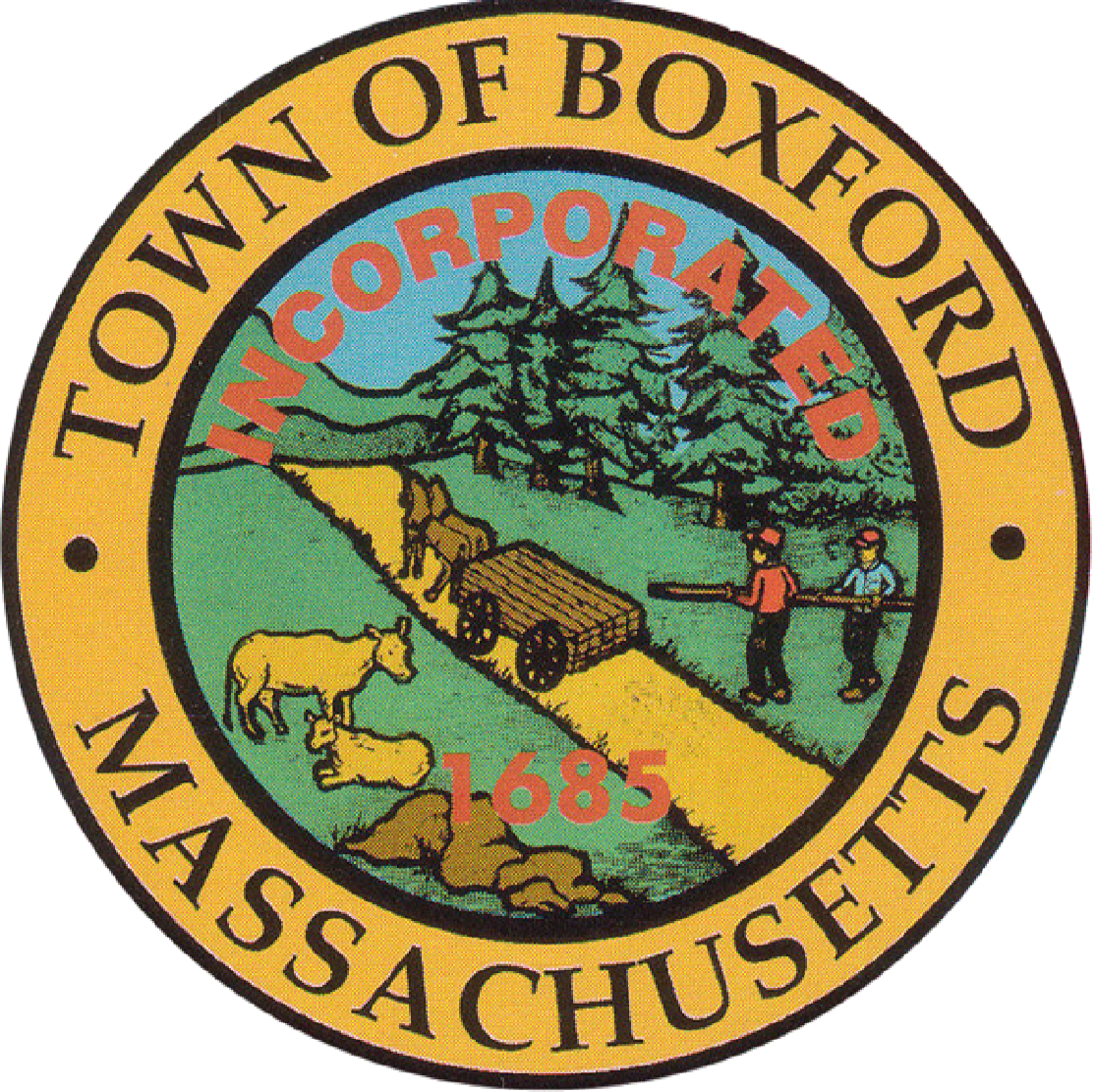
- Flag Seal Wordmark

- Location in Essex County and the state of Massachusetts.
- Coordinates: 42°39′40″N 70°59′50″W
- Country: United States
- State: Massachusetts
- County: Essex
- Settled: 1645
- Incorporated: 1685

Government
  - Type: Open town meeting
  - Town Administrator: Matthew Coogan

Area
  - Total: 24.4 sq mi (63.2 km^{2})
  - Land: 23.6 sq mi (61.0 km^{2})
  - Water: 0.85 sq mi (2.2 km^{2})
- Elevation: 95 ft (29 m)

Population (2020)
  - Total: 8,203
  - Density: 348/sq mi (134/km^{2})
- Time zone: UTC-5 (Eastern)
  - Summer (DST): UTC-4 (Eastern)
- ZIP code: 01921
- Area code: 351 / 978
- FIPS code: 25-07420
- GNIS feature ID: 0618294
- Website: Town of Boxford Official Web Site
- The town of Boxford has no stoplights, no street lights and only has four stores in the whole town. Wayne's Convenience store, Benson's Homemade Ice Cream, West Village Provisions, and Boxford House of Pizza.

Boxford is a town in Essex County, Massachusetts, United States. According to the U.S. Census Bureau, the town's population was 8,203 in 2020.

The original town center of Boxford, along with East Boxford and other areas in the eastern part of the town, comprise the census-designated place of Boxford.

== History ==
Native Americans inhabited northeastern Massachusetts for thousands of years prior to European colonization of the Americas. At the time of contact, the area that would become Boxford was controlled by Agawam sachem Masconomet, but the Agawam would experience severe population loss from virgin soil epidemics, especially in 1617–1619, killing an estimated 50–75% of the indigenous population in the region. Although Boxford was settled by Europeans in 1646, it was not until 1700 that the selectmen of Boxford would pay Masconomet's grandson Samuel English nine pounds for the rights to the town land.

Europeans first settled in Boxford in 1646 as a part of Rowley Village by Abraham Redington. When Boxford was officially incorporated in 1685, about forty families resided there. Farming was the primary occupation of the early settlers, although townspeople also counted craftsmen among their ranks. The original structure of Boxford's First Church was constructed in 1701 in East Boxford Village. As the population of West Boxford expanded, the legislature designated this section of town as precinct 2 in 1735. Town meetings then alternated between East and West parishes. The first West Boxford church building was erected in 1774. The town's largest industry—a match factory located on Lawrence Road—opened its doors just after the end of the American Civil War, and operated from 1866 to 1905.

As part of the American Bicentennial celebrations which took place during the mid-1970s, residents of Boxford, Massachusetts, visited two villages named Boxford in England in 1975. The aim of their trip was to search for the source of their town's name, ultimately deciding that the village of Boxford in the Babergh district of Suffolk, England, was likely the original source. Villagers from Boxford, Suffolk, were then invited to Boxford, Massachusetts, the following summer for two-week homestays with local host families. This second transatlantic exchange, which began in late July 1976, generated media attention from both Evening Standard and the BBC's Nationwide program Sally's Dumptruck.

== Geography ==
According to the United States Census Bureau, the town has a total area of 24.4 square miles (63.2 km^{2}), of which 23.6 square miles (61.0 km^{2}) is land and 0.85 square miles (2.2 km^{2}), or 3.46%, is water.

Boxford is divided into Boxford Village (commonly called East Boxford) and West Boxford Village, corresponding to the respective East and West Boxford centers. It is heavily forested and criss-crossed by various streams and brooks, many of which empty into the Ipswich River on Boxford's southern border. A number of ponds dot town as well, among them Stiles Pond, Cedar Pond, Spofford Pond, Lowe Pond, Four Mile Pond and Baldpate Pond. Throughout Boxford there are also a number of scenic hiking trails. The highest natural point in Boxford is Bald Hill, at an elevation of 243 feet (74 m). It sits in a corner of the Boxford State Forest, near Interstate 95 and the town's border with Middleton.

Small farms are interspersed throughout Boxford. Stone walls, remnants of old farming land boundaries, meander through the area. One major farm located in Boxford is Small Oxx farm, a branch of the main farm, Smolak's, located in North Andover.

Boxford is located near the geographic center of Essex County, with Boxford Center about 10 miles (16 km) southeast of Lawrence and 24 miles (39 km) north of Boston. The town is bordered by Haverhill to the north, Groveland to the northeast, Georgetown and Rowley to the east, Ipswich and Topsfield to the southeast, Middleton to the southwest, and North Andover to the west.

The eastern end of Boxford is crossed by Interstate 95, with three exits lying within the town. Route 133 crosses through the northern part of town, from North Andover to Georgetown, and Route 97 crosses through the eastern part of town, from Topsfield to Georgetown. The town does not have any means of mass transportation. The Newburyport/Rockport Line of the MBTA Commuter Rail passes through neighboring Rowley and Ipswich to the east, and the Haverhill/Reading Line passes to the north. The nearest small airport is Lawrence Municipal Airport, located in North Andover, and the nearest domestic and international air service is Logan International Airport.

== Demographics ==
Historical population
Year	Pop.	±%
1790	925	—
1850	982	+6.2%
1860	1,020	+3.9%
1870	847	−17.0%
1880	824	−2.7%
1890	865	+5.0%
1900	704	−18.6%
1910	718	+2.0%
1920	588	−18.1%
1930	652	+10.9%
1940	778	+19.3%
1950	926	+19.0%
1960	2,010	+117.1%
1970	4,032	+100.6%
1980	5,374	+33.3%
1990	6,266	+16.6%
2000	7,921	+26.4%
2010	7,965	+0.6%
2020	8,203	+3.0%
2022*	8,112	−1.1%
* = population estimate. Source: United States census records and Population Estimates Program data.

As of the census of 2000, there were 7,921 people, 2,568 households, and 2,254 families residing in the town. The population density was 330.4 inhabitants per square mile (127.6/km^{2}). There were 2,610 housing units at an average density of 42.0 persons/km^{2} (108.9 persons/sq mi). The racial makeup of the town was 97.37% White, 0.34% African American, 0.11% Native American, 1.21% Asian, 0.03% Pacific Islander, 0.29% from other races, and 0.64% from two or more races. 0.85% of the population were Hispanic or Latino of any race.

There were 2,568 households, out of which 48.5% had children under the age of 18 living with them, 80.0% were married couples living together, 6.0% had a female householder with no husband present, and 12.2% were non-families. 9.7% of all households were made up of individuals, and 4.9% had someone living alone who was 65 years of age or older. The average household size was 3.08 and the average family size was 3.32.

In the town, the population was spread out, with 32.2% under the age of 18, 4.2% from 18 to 24, 25.8% from 25 to 44, 28.5% from 45 to 64, and 9.3% who were 65 years of age or older. The median age was 39 years. For every 100 females, there were 98.9 males. For every 100 females age 18 and over, there were 94.8 males.

The median income for a household in the town was $113,212, and the median income for a family was $119,491. Males had a median income of $90,397 versus $48,042 for females. The per capita income for the town was $48,846. 1.4% of the population and 0.8% of families were below the poverty line. Out of the total people living in poverty, 0.8% are under the age of 18 and 3.1% are 65 or older

== Government and infrastructure ==
Boxford employs the open town meeting form of government, and is led by a board of selectmen and a town executive secretary. Boxford has a police department, a fire department with two branches in the main villages, two post offices, a public works department and a library, which is isolated within the town hall. Boxford has no water department; all residents and businesses have wells and septic. A second library was located in West Boxford, but due to budget constraints it was closed in 2008. The nearest hospitals are Merrimack Valley Hospital in Haverhill to the north, Lawrence General to the west, and Beverly Hospital to the south.

On the state level, Boxford is under the jurisdiction of the Central District Court of Essex County, located in Haverhill. It is patrolled by the Newbury station of Troop A of the Massachusetts State Police. The town is represented by two representatives, from the Second and Eighteenth Essex districts, in the Massachusetts House of Representatives, and as part of the First Essex and Middlesex district in the Massachusetts Senate. On the national level, the town is part of Massachusetts's 6th congressional district, and has been represented by Seth Moulton (D) since 2014. The state's senior Senator, elected in the 2012, is Elizabeth Warren (D), and its junior Senator, elected in 2013, is Ed Markey.

== Politics ==
One of the few communities in Massachusetts to have more registered Republicans than Democrats (as of 2012), Boxford is more conservative than the rest of the state. It was the only town not to vote to reelect Senator John Kerry in 2008. In 2012, Mitt Romney received 59% of the vote in Boxford compared to President Obama's 40%. Hillary Clinton, however, became the first Democratic presidential nominee to win the town in the 21st century in 2016. The former Secretary of State defeated Republican entrepreneur Donald Trump by 47.93–42.85 percent of the vote, with 5.80 percent going to Libertarian Gary Johnson. In 2020, Boxford's numbers were much more line with most other Massachusetts towns, as Joe Biden carried the town by a 15-point margin.

Boxford town vote by party in presidential elections
Year	Democratic	Republican	Third Parties
2020	55.84% 3,117	40.69% 2,271	3.47% 194
2016	47.12% 2,454	42.13% 2,194	10.75% 560
2012	39.79% 2,066	58.42% 3,034	1.79% 93
2008	45.90% 2,286	51.92% 2,586	2.18% 109
2004	42.91% 2,064	55.37% 2,664	1.72% 83
2000	40.57% 1,804	51.99% 2,312	7.44% 331
1996	39.33% 1,619	50.06% 2,061	10.61% 437
1992	29.34% 1,153	44.23% 1,738	26.43% 1,039
1988	32.00% 1,158	65.81% 2,381	2.19% 79
1984	25.10% 769	74.51% 2,283	0.39% 12
1980	20.10% 570	61.13% 1,733	18.77% 532
1976	28.30% 714	67.62% 1,706	4.08% 103
1972	28.27% 588	70.04% 1,457	1.69% 35
1968	26.62% 446	70.69% 1,184	2.69% 45
1960	18.41% 200	80.94% 879	0.65% 7
1956	10.52% 76	88.65% 640	0.83% 6
1952	11.82% 71	84.86% 510	3.32% 20
1948	13.88% 64	85.25% 393	0.87% 4
1944	20.82% 92	79.18% 350	0.00% 0
1940	19.90% 85	80.10% 342	0.00% 0
1900	12.60% 17	85.18% 115	2.22% 3
1896	4.31% 6	84.89% 118	10.80% 15
1892	33.13% 54	62.57% 102	4.30% 7
1888	30.54% 51	64.07% 107	5.39% 9
1884	29.81% 48	63.98% 103	6.21% 10
1880	34.11% 58	65.89% 112	0.00% 0
1876	26.09% 42	73.91% 119	0.00% 0
1872	16.80% 22	83.20% 109	0.00% 0
1868	21.09% 31	78.91% 116	0.00% 0
1864	23.35% 39	76.65% 128	0.00% 0
1856	11.93% 21	75.00% 132	13.07% 23

== Education ==
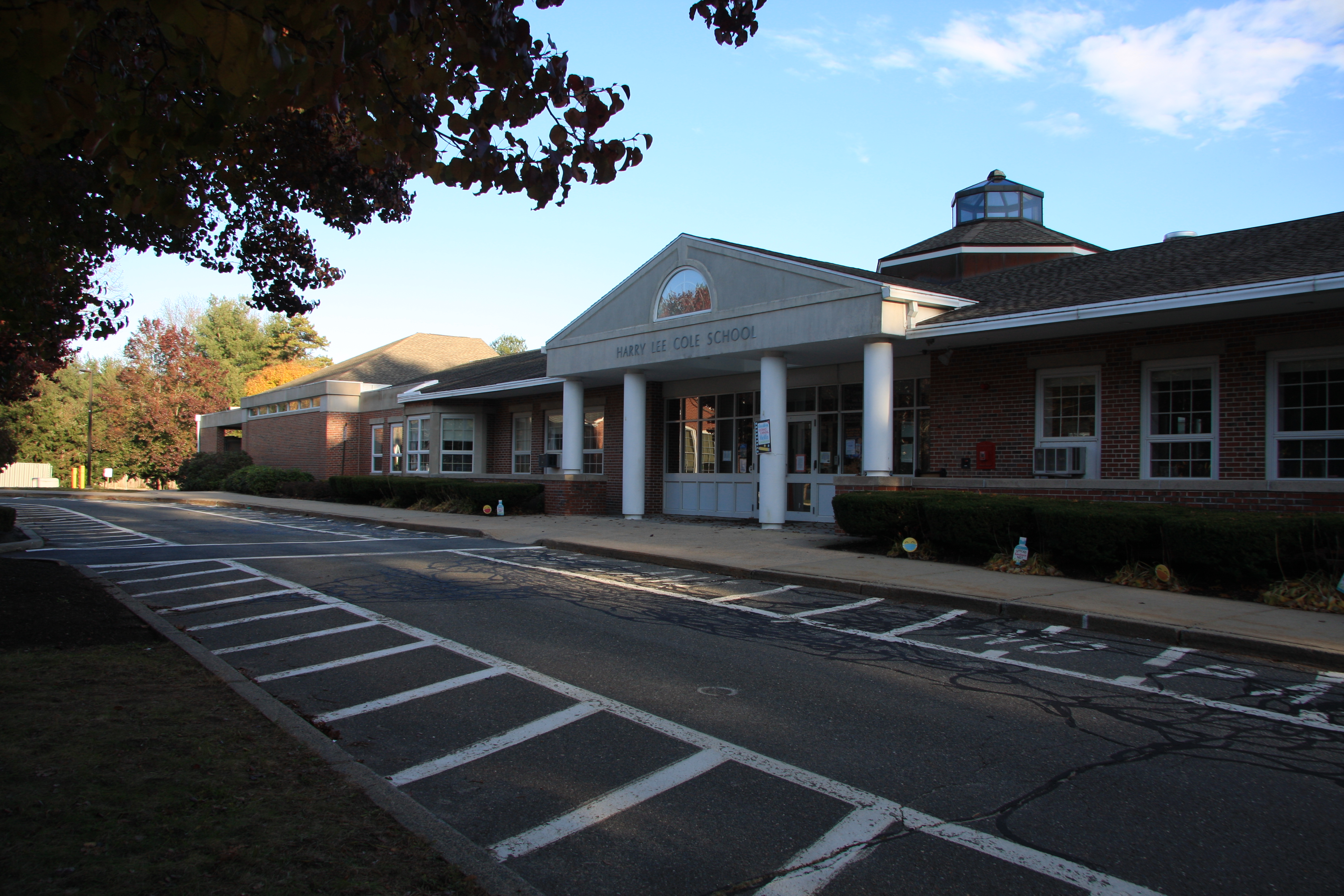
Harry Lee Cole School

Boxford has one high school, Masconomet Regional High School, named after Chief Masconomet, sagamore of the Agawam tribe, who lived in Essex County at the time of English colonization. Masconomet is a regional school, serving the towns of Boxford, Middleton, and Topsfield. The school was commonly believed to be in Topsfield because it had a Topsfield street address. However, the school, which is located on Endicott Road, lies entirely within Boxford. Students may also elect to attend Essex North Shore Agricultural and Technical High School in Danvers. Nearby private schools include The Governor's Academy in Byfield; Pingree School in South Hamilton; St. John's Preparatory School (boys only) in Danvers; Phillips Academy in Andover; and Brooks School in North Andover.

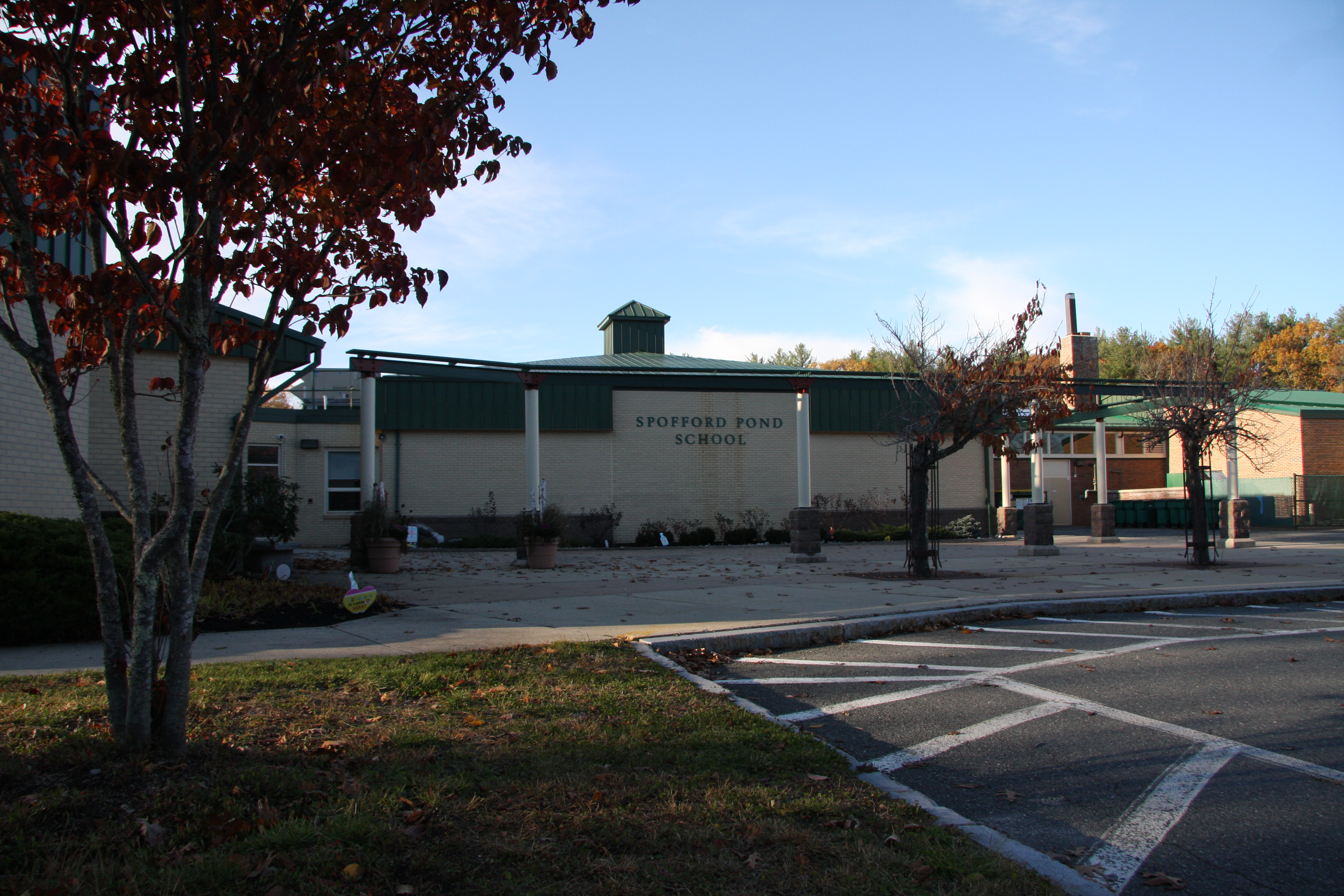
Spofford Pond School

Masconomet Regional Middle School is also located in Boxford, and is attached to the high school. There are also three elementary schools in Boxford. The Harry Lee Cole School, which serves Preschool through Grade 2, is located near East Boxford center. The Spofford Pond School, serving Grades 3 through 6, is located on the western side of the town's geographic center, near Boxford's town hall. Boxford Academy, serving Preschool through Grade 5, is located in First Church Congregational Boxford on Georgetown Road.

== Points of interest ==
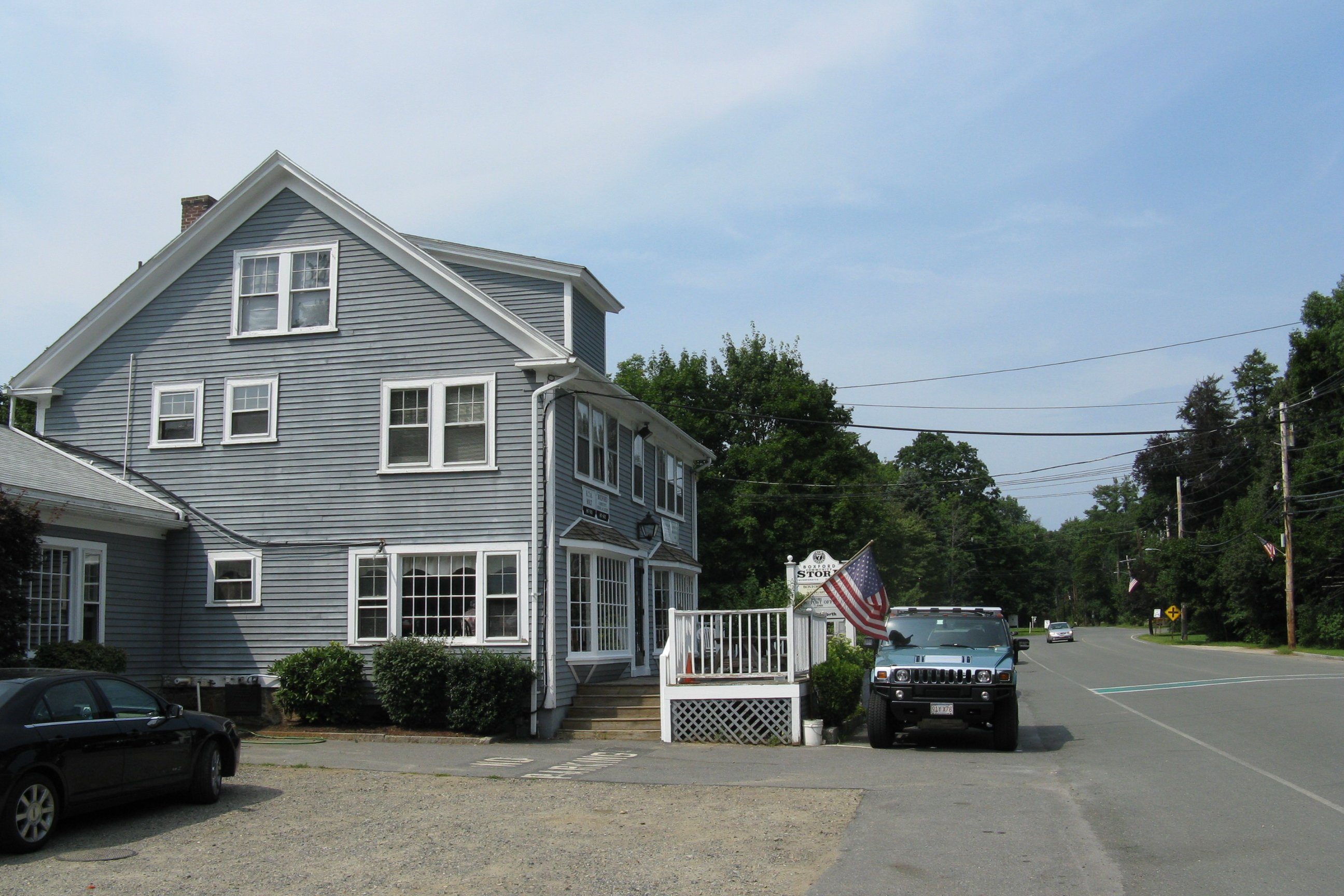
Boxford Community Store

Boxford State Forest, near Interstate 95 and the towns of Topsfield and Middleton, boasts numerous walking trails that weave through heavily forested areas. There are also smaller parks and trails like the Wildcat trail and Witch Hollow Farm trails located within the thick forests. Much of the open lands within town are managed by the Boxford Trails Association/Boxford Open Land Trust.

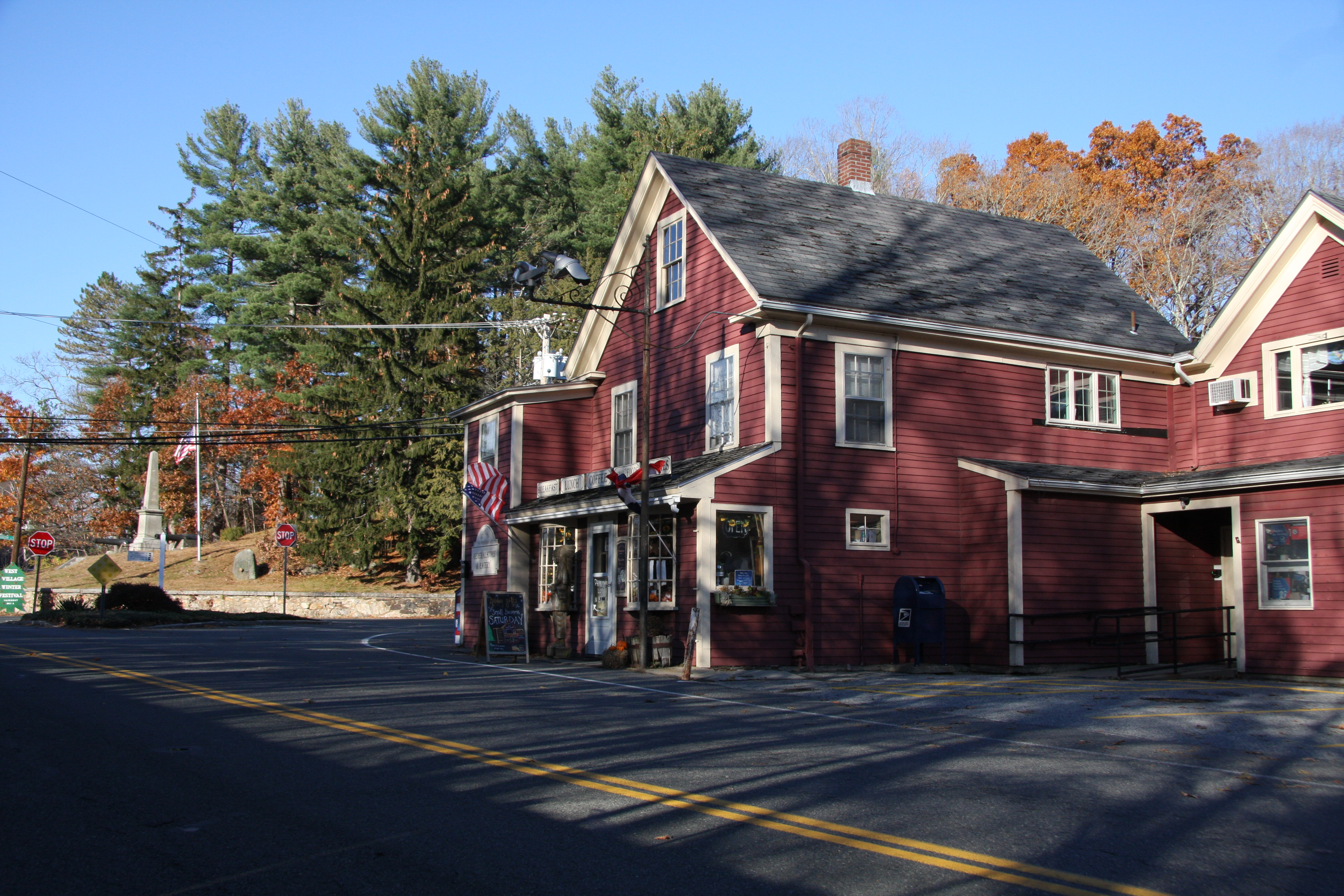
West Village Store and Post Office

Boxford is also well known for its Apple Festival, happening each fall. The apple festival takes place on the streets near Waynes. "Witch Hollow Farm", (a.k.a. the Tyler-Wood House) built c. 1727 by Capt. John Tyler the son of Moses Tyler whose sister-in-law, Rebecca Eames was tried in the famous 1693 Salem Witch Trials, found at the intersection of Main Street and Ipswich Road in Boxford. The house gets its name from a hollow that was on the Tyler property in the 1690s where Rebecca Eames claimed, in her trial, that she was bewitched by the Devil. It is a nationally recognized "Haunted House".

Boxford's centrally located Stiles Pond is the site for the town beach, where membership can be purchased by Boxford residents only, each season for a nominal fee through the Boxford Athletic Association (BAA). The adjacent ballpark and play area were recently designated by unanimous vote at Town Meeting as "Keith Koster Memorial Baseball Park" in memory of one of Boxford's beloved young people, a former Boxford beach lifeguard, baseball and football player who fell victim to a senseless act of crime in 2006.

Baldpate Pond, and the adjacent state recreation area, is another popular swimming, fishing, boating, and hiking location.

Camp Rotary is a popular summer co-ed boarding camp located on Stiles Pond off Ipswich Road in Boxford. Danvers YMCA holds another popular summer day camp on Stiles Pond, next to the town beach.

Recently constructed is the Boxford Commons. Boxford Commons is an outdoor sports recreation area that includes a football/soccer/field hockey fields. Boxford Commons also includes a play area for younger children. The Commons is located on Captain Cashin way, off of Middleton Rd near Harry Lee Cole School and the Boxford Fire Department. The fields are primarily used for sports for toddlers up to middle schoolers. The main field is a turf field used primarily for football and soccer.

== In popular culture ==
The fictional main character captain Ed Mercer of the American science-fiction television series The Orville was from Boxford in the late 24th century.

== Notable people ==
- Anna Bargman (born 2002), player for the New York Sirens
- Raymond Bourque (born 1960), Boston Bruins – Hall of Fame member – former team captain
- Mark Bavaro (born 1963), Pro Bowl football player for the New York Giants
- Johnny Bucyk (born 1935), Boston Bruins – Hall of Famer – former team captain
- Thomas Knowlton (1740–1776), colonel in the Continental Army during the American Revolution
- Chris Kreider (born 1991), Boston College Eagles men's ice hockey and NHL player currently playing for the Montreal Canadiens
- Charlotte Nichols Saunders Horner (1823–1906), botanist and plant collector; born in Boxford
- Earle O. Latham (1908–1999), first vice-president of the Federal Reserve Bank of Boston
- Alice Freeman Palmer (1855–1902), educator and president of Wellesley College
- Sidney Perley (1858–1928), lawyer, writer, author, poet and historian
- Rufus Porter (1792–1884), painter, designer of the Colt revolver, and founder of Scientific American
- Dan Ross (born 1957), Cincinnati Bengals tight end, [Pro Bowl 1982], [Super Bowl XVI, 11 receptions]
- Debra Jo Rupp (born 1951), actress, known for her role as Kitty Foreman in That '70s Show
- Henry Knox Sherrill (1890–1980), an Episcopal clergyman and the 20th Presiding Bishop of the Episcopal Church from 1947 to 1958, having previously served as Bishop of Massachusetts (1930–1947)
- Jermaine Wiggins, New England Patriots
- Carl Yastrzemski (born 1939), longtime left fielder for the Boston Red Sox and a Major League Baseball Hall of Fame member

== Sources ==
- Perley, Sidney. History of Boxford, Essex County, Massachusetts. Full images at books.google.Published 1880.
- Perley, Francis, Samuel Wood, Moses Carleton. 1795 Map of Boxford.
- Dorman, Moses. 1830 Map of Boxford.
- Beers, D.G. 1872 Atlas of Essex County 1872 Map of Boxford. Plate 57.
- Walker, George H. 1884 Atlas of Essex County 1884 Map of Boxford. Plate 109.
- Vital Records of Boxford to 1849. Originally published by the Topsfield Historical Society in 1905. Transcribed and put online by John Slaughter and Jodi Salero 2007.
- Boxford Town Records 1685–1706. Transcribed by Sidney Perley in 1880. From page 41 of Volume 5 of The Historical Collections of the Topsfield Historical Society. Published 1899. Full image and OCR at books.google.
- Burt, Bill (2007-07-02). "'67 Sox were there from start to finish". Gloucester Daily Times. Archived from the original on 6 October 2008.
- Goode, John (2004-12-14). "A Giant Among Us". Boston.com. Archived from the original on 19 March 2005.
