= Lowell-Dracut-Tyngsboro State Forest =

Forest in Massachusetts, United States

- Location within Massachusetts Location within the United States
- Location: Middlesex County, Massachusetts, United States
- Coordinates: 42°39′52″N 71°21′51″W
- Area: 1,109 acres (449 ha)
- Elevation: 151 ft (46 m)
- Established: 1941
- Named for: The towns where it is located
- Administrator: Massachusetts Department of Conservation and Recreation
- Website: Official website

Lowell-Dracut-Tyngsboro State Forest is a publicly owned forest with recreational features, measuring 1,109 acres (449 ha) and lying contiguously in the City of Lowell, and the towns of Dracut and Tyngsborough, Massachusetts. The forest has 180 acres (73 ha) of ponds, swamps, and wetlands, and is maintained by the Massachusetts Department of Conservation and Recreation.

== History ==
The area that makes up the state forest originally belonged to the Mohawk, Huron, and Wowenocks Native Americans. It was later colonized by Western settlers before becoming the Pawtucket Falls Indian Reservation. In 1941, Thomas Varnum sold several hundred acres of Hawk Valley Farm to the state for the creation of Lowell-Dracut State Forest.

== Activities and amenities ==
The forest offers fishing and restricted hunting in addition to six miles of trails used for hiking, mountains biking, horseback riding, cross-country skiing, and snowmobiling. Motorized vehicles are restricted to seasonal snowmobiles. Park access-points are at Trotting Park Road, Gumpus Road, Totman Road, Fellows Lane, and Althea Avenue.
