= Sampas Pavilion =

Outdoor amphitheater in Lowell, Massachusetts

Coordinates: 42.642779°N 71.340612°W

- Interactive map of Sampas Pavilion
- Location: Lowell, Massachusetts
- Owner: Lowell Heritage State Park
- Seating type: Lawn
- Capacity: 1,000
- Type: Outdoor amphitheatre

Sampas Pavilion is an outdoor amphitheater located in the Pawtucketville neighborhood of Lowell, Massachusetts along the Pawtucket Boulevard, 25 miles northwest of Boston, Massachusetts, United States, and owned by the state of Massachusetts. The pavilion is located on the banks of the Merrimack River and is part of Lowell Heritage State Park. The seating capacity is approximately 1,000, consisting of general admission lawn seats and additional seating in the back. The venue has been in use since the early 1970s and has been used for events such as musical performances, ethnic festivals, and political rallies. The pavilion hosts a summer concert series, motorcycle rallies, and the city of Lowell's Fourth of July fireworks.

== Notable musical performances ==
The following have performed at the Sampas Pavilion:

- Under The Fig Tree
- Arthur Fiedler and the Boston Pops Orchestra

== See also ==
- List of contemporary amphitheatres
