= Lowell, Massachusetts =

City in Massachusetts, United States

- City
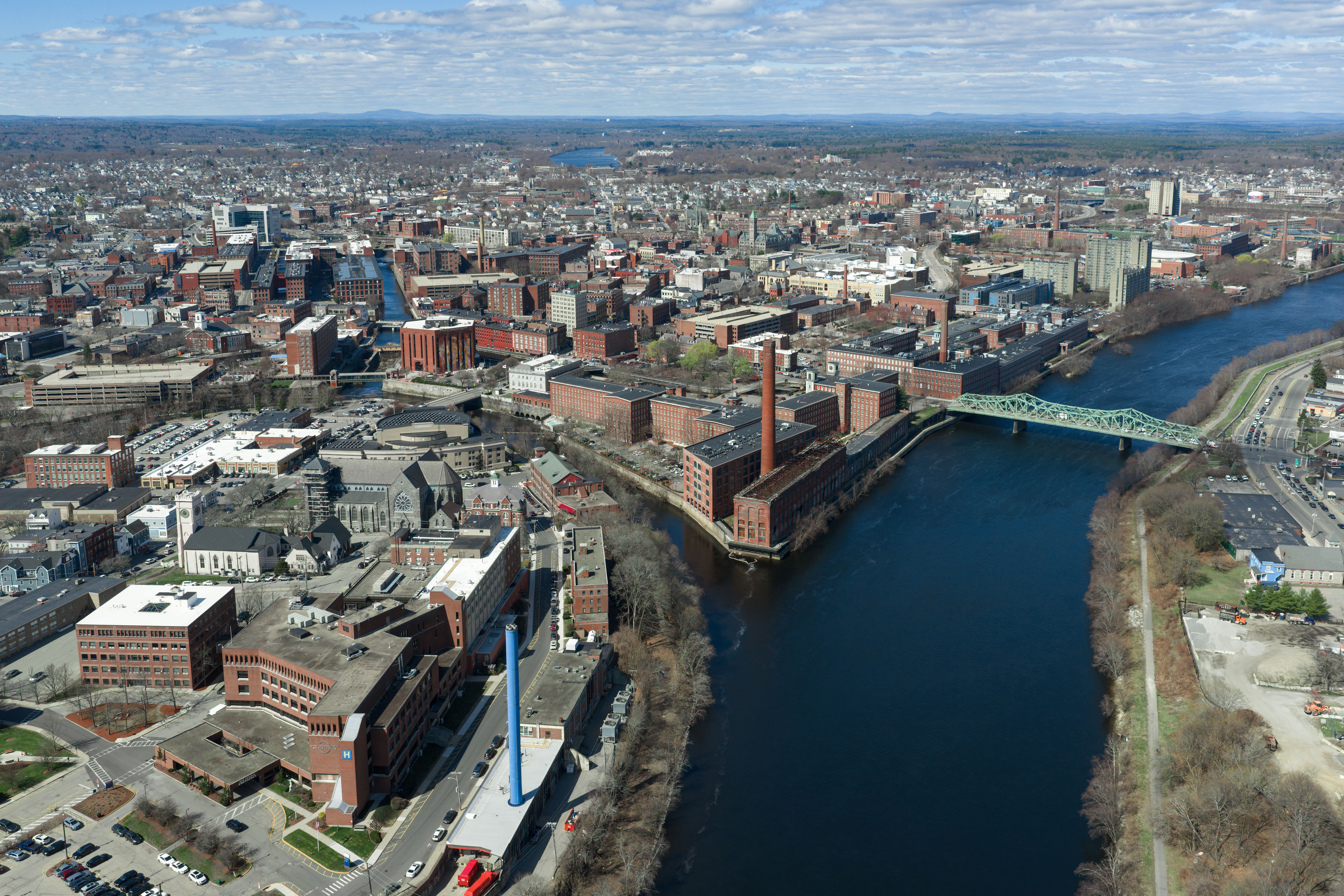
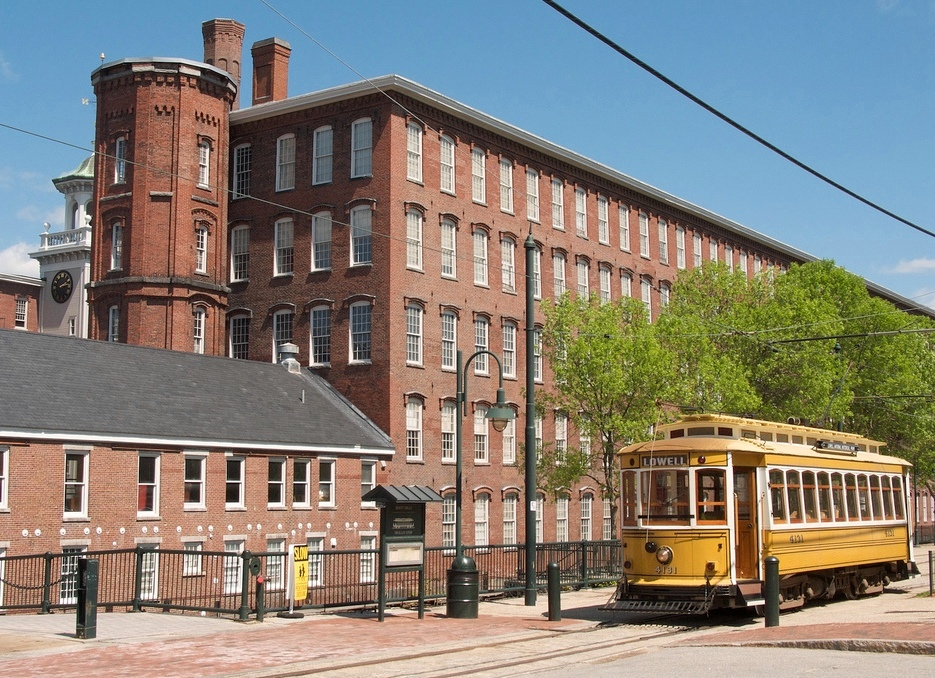
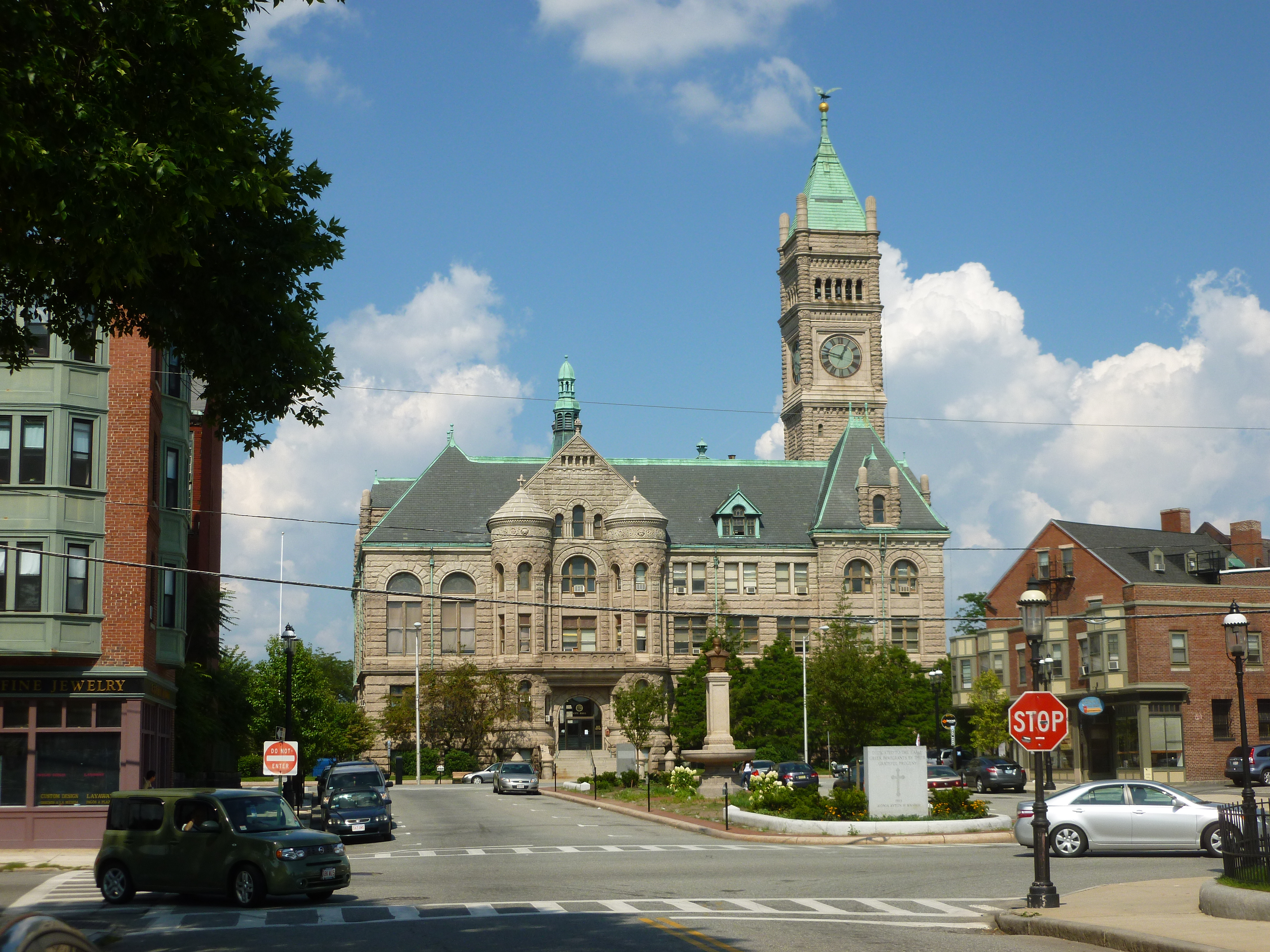
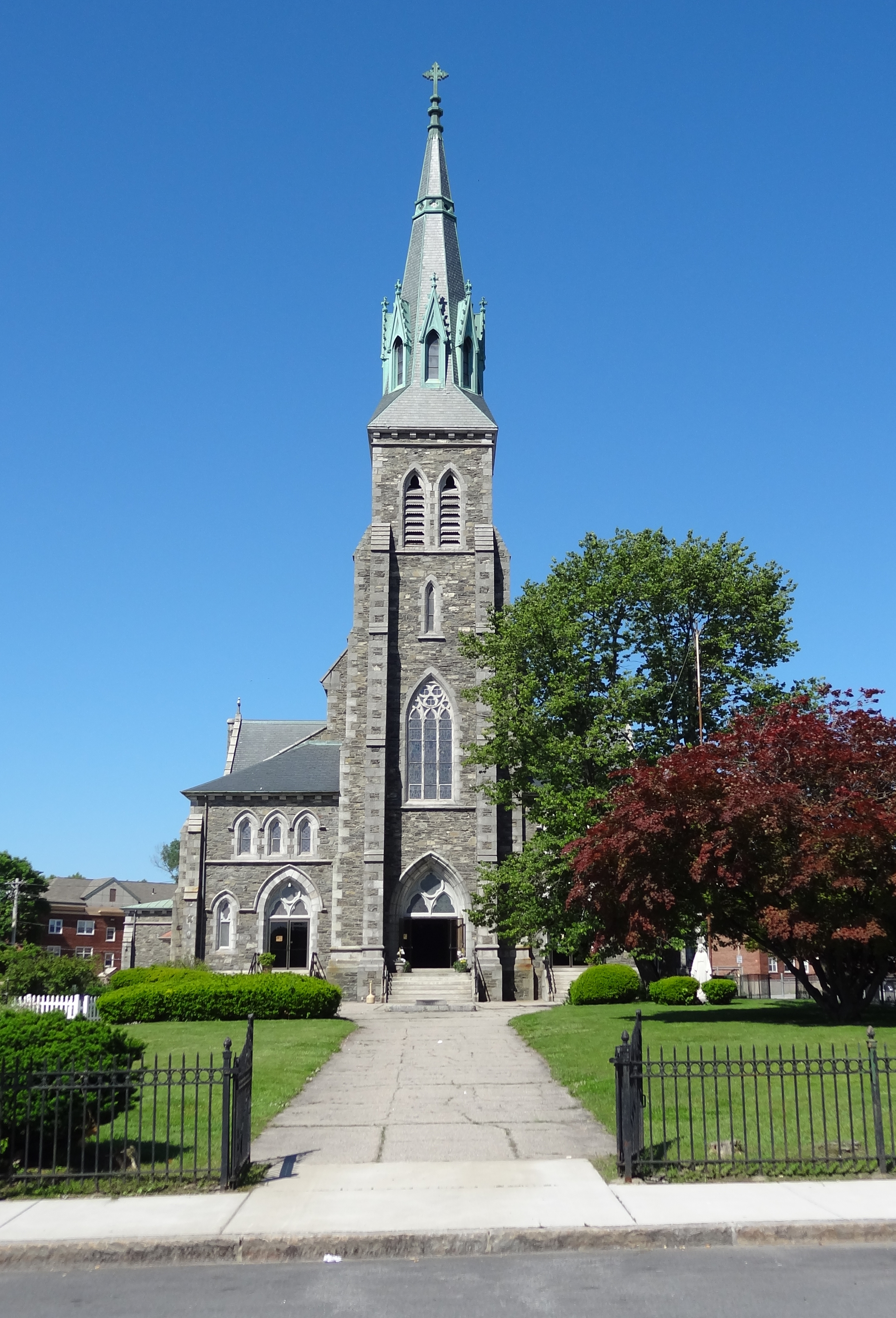
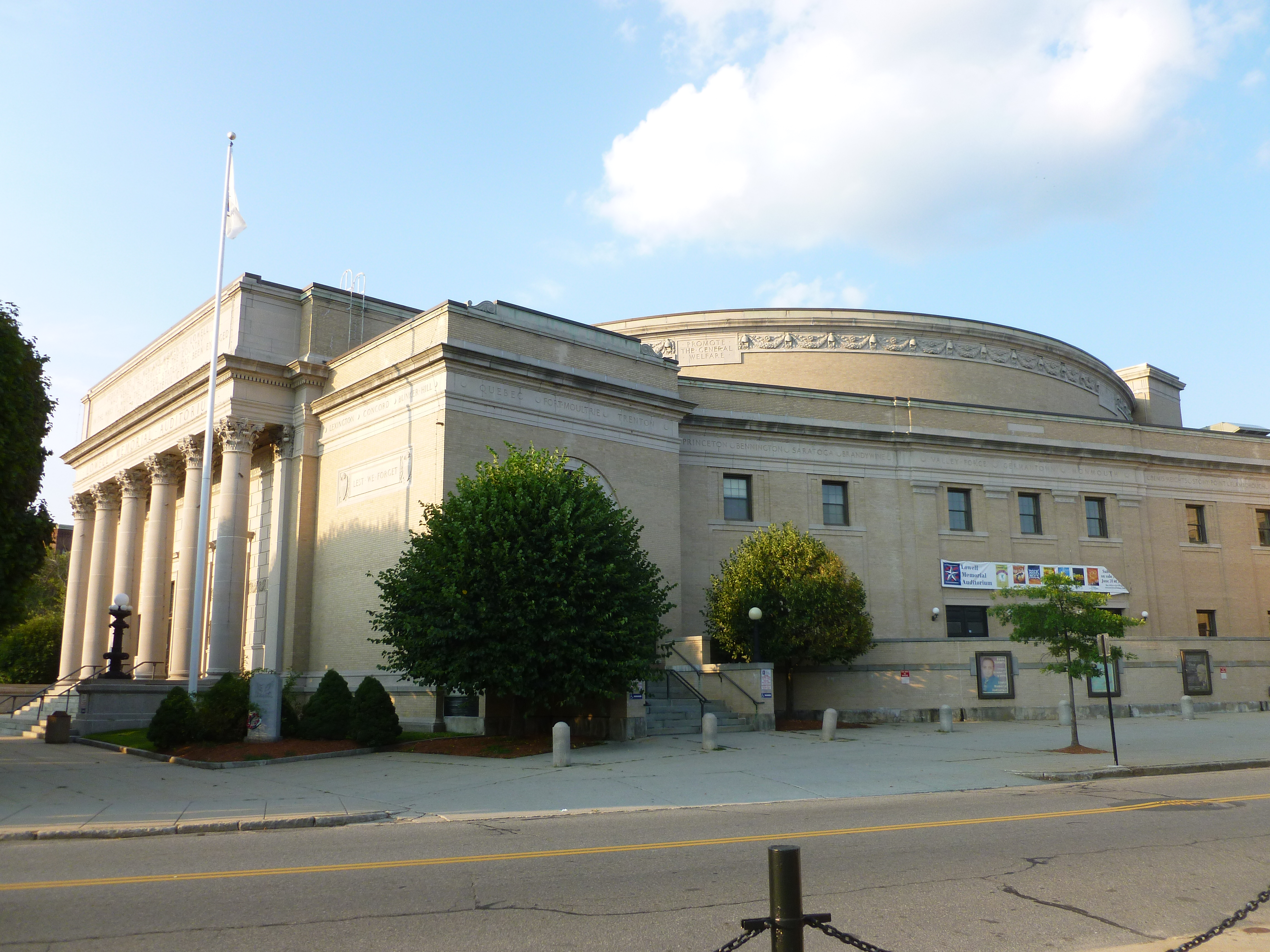
- Downtown Lowell Lowell Mills Lowell City Hall St. Patrick's Church Lowell Memorial Auditorium

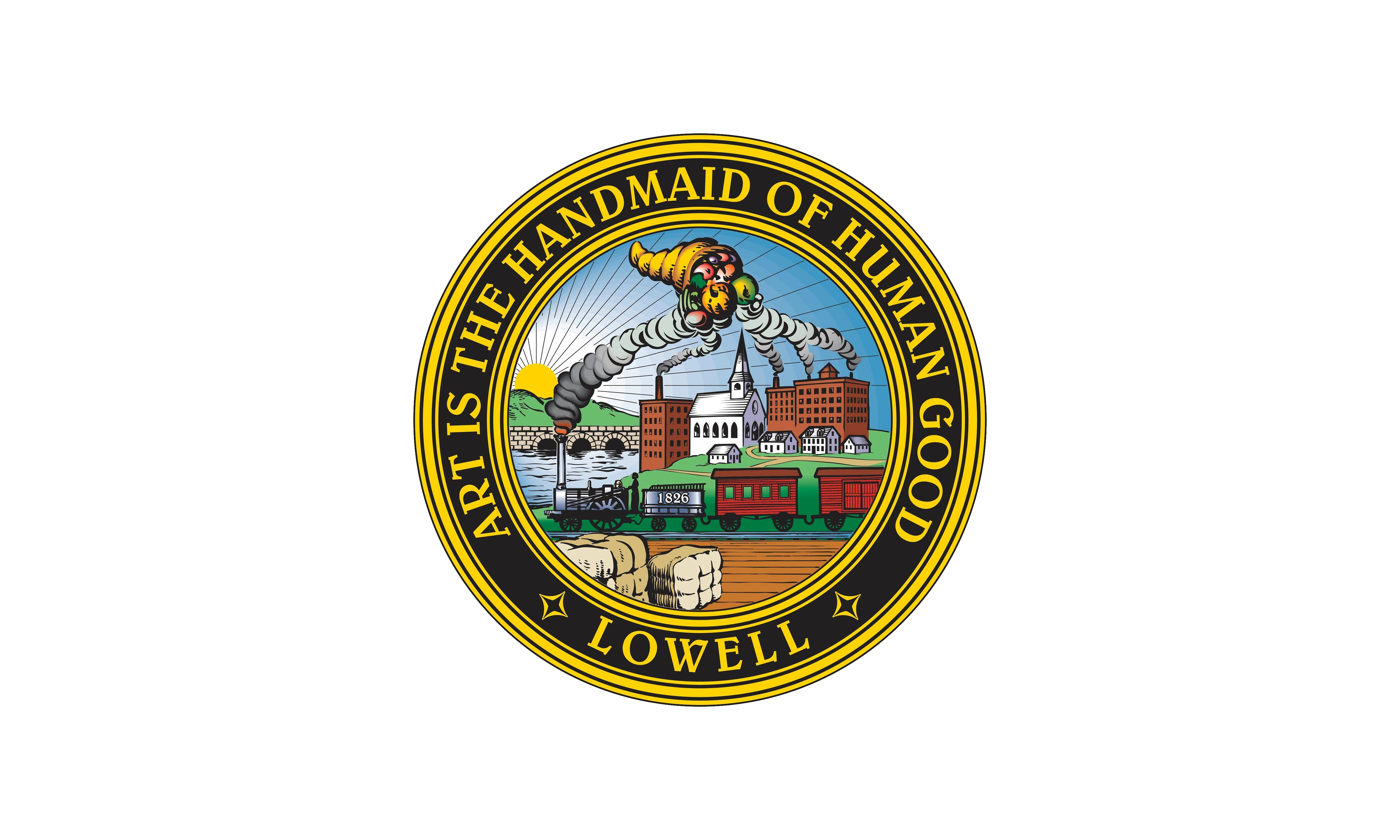
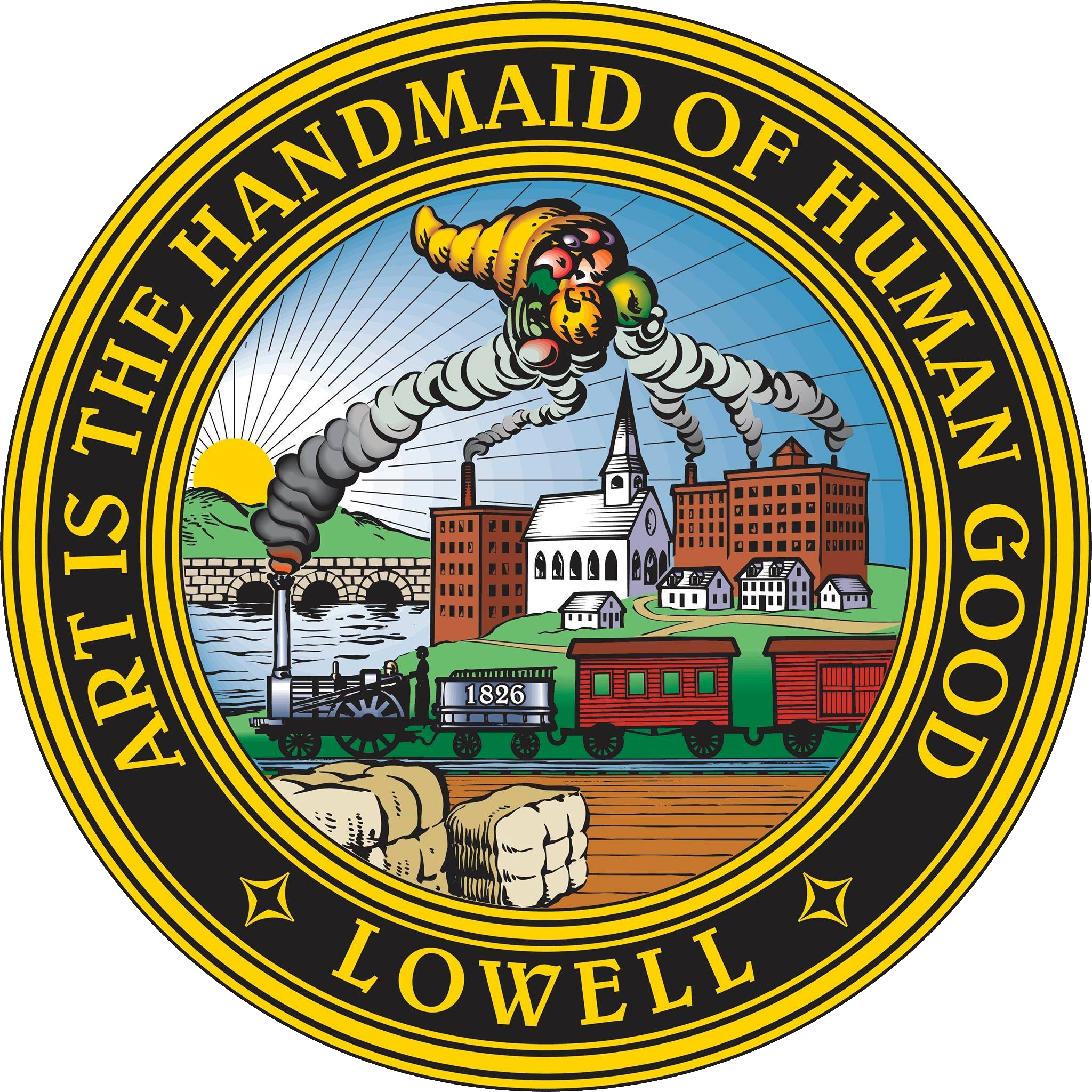
- Flag Seal
- Nicknames: Mill City, Spindle City, City of Lights, City of Magic
- Motto: "Art is the Handmaid of Human Good."
- Location in Middlesex County in Massachusetts

- Location in the United States Lowell (the United States)
- Coordinates: 42°38′22″N 71°18′53″W
- Country: United States
- State: Massachusetts
- County: Middlesex
- Region: New England
- Settled: 1652
- Incorporated: 1826
- A city: 1836
- Named for: Francis Cabot Lowell

Government
  - Type: Manager-City council
  - Mayor: Erik Gitschier
  - City Manager: Thomas Golden Jr.

Area
  - Total: 14.53 sq mi (37.63 km^{2})
  - Land: 13.61 sq mi (35.25 km^{2})
  - Water: 0.92 sq mi (2.38 km^{2})
- Elevation: 102 ft (31 m)

Population (2020)
  - Total: 115,554
  - Density: 8,490.0/sq mi (3,278.02/km^{2})
  - Demonym: Lowellian
- Time zone: UTC−5 (Eastern)
  - Summer (DST): UTC−4 (Eastern)
- ZIP Codes: 01850–01854
- Area code: 978 / 351
- FIPS code: 25-37000
- GNIS feature ID: 0611832
- Website: lowellma.gov

Lowell (/ˈloʊəl/) is a city in Massachusetts, United States. Alongside Cambridge, it is one of the two traditional seats of Middlesex County. With an estimated population of 115,554 in 2020, it was the fifth most populous city in Massachusetts as of the last census, and the third most populous in the Boston metropolitan statistical area. The city is also part of a smaller Massachusetts statistical area, called Greater Lowell, and of New England's Merrimack Valley region.

Incorporated in 1826 to serve as a mill town, Lowell was named after Francis Cabot Lowell, a local figure in the Industrial Revolution. The city became known as the cradle of the American Industrial Revolution because of its textile mills and factories. Many of Lowell's historic manufacturing sites were later preserved by the National Park Service to create Lowell National Historical Park. During the Cambodian genocide (1975–1979), the city took in an influx of refugees, leading to a Cambodia Town and America's second-largest Cambodian-American population.

Lowell is home to two institutions of higher education. UMass Lowell, part of the University of Massachusetts system, has three campuses in the city. Middlesex Community College's two campuses are in Lowell and in the town of Bedford, Massachusetts. Arts facilities in the city include the Whistler House Museum of Art, the Merrimack Repertory Theatre, the Lowell Memorial Auditorium, and Sampas Pavilion. In sports, the city has a long tradition of boxing, hosting the annual New England Golden Gloves boxing tournament. The city has a baseball stadium, Edward A. LeLacheur Park, and a multipurpose indoor sports arena, the Tsongas Center, both of which have hosted collegiate and minor-league professional sports teams. Cawley Stadium, home of the Lowell High School Red Raiders, also played host to the Boston Patriots during their first season.

== History ==
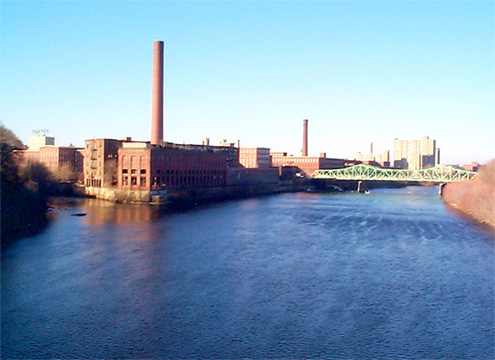
The Massachusetts Mill at the confluence of the Merrimack and Concord Rivers; across the Cox Bridge are the Boott Mills; in the upper left is the historic Lowell Sun building with its iconic sign on top.

=== Indigenous and colonial history ===
The Pawtucket Falls, which provided the hydropower for Lowell's industry in the 1800s, also served as an important seasonal fishing site for native people at the time of European colonization in the 1600s. The Pawtucket people are named for this location, literally meaning "at the falls" in Massachusett. In the mid-1600s, English efforts to convert native people to Christianity led to the founding of the "praying town" of Wamesit at the confluence of the Concord and Merrimack Rivers in what is today Lowell, however the Christian population of Wamesit was reckoned at only 75 people just prior to King Phillip's War, which significantly altered relations between English colonists and indigenous groups in New England, and led to the abandonment of many praying towns. By the 1800s, the area that would become Lowell was part of the farming community of East Chelmsford, Massachusetts.

=== Founding and early industry ===
Founded in the 1820s as a planned manufacturing center for textiles, Lowell is located along the rapids of the Merrimack River, 25 miles (40 km) northwest of Boston in what used to be a farming community called East Chelmsford, Massachusetts. The so-called Boston Associates, including Nathan Appleton and Patrick Tracy Jackson of the Boston Manufacturing Company, named the new mill town after their visionary leader, Francis Cabot Lowell, who had died five years before its 1823 incorporation. As Lowell's population grew, it acquired land from neighboring towns, and diversified into a full-fledged urban center. Many of the men who composed the labor force for constructing the canals and factories had immigrated from Ireland, escaping the poverty and Great Famine of the 1830s and 1840s. The mill workers, young single women called Mill Girls, generally came from the farm families of New England.

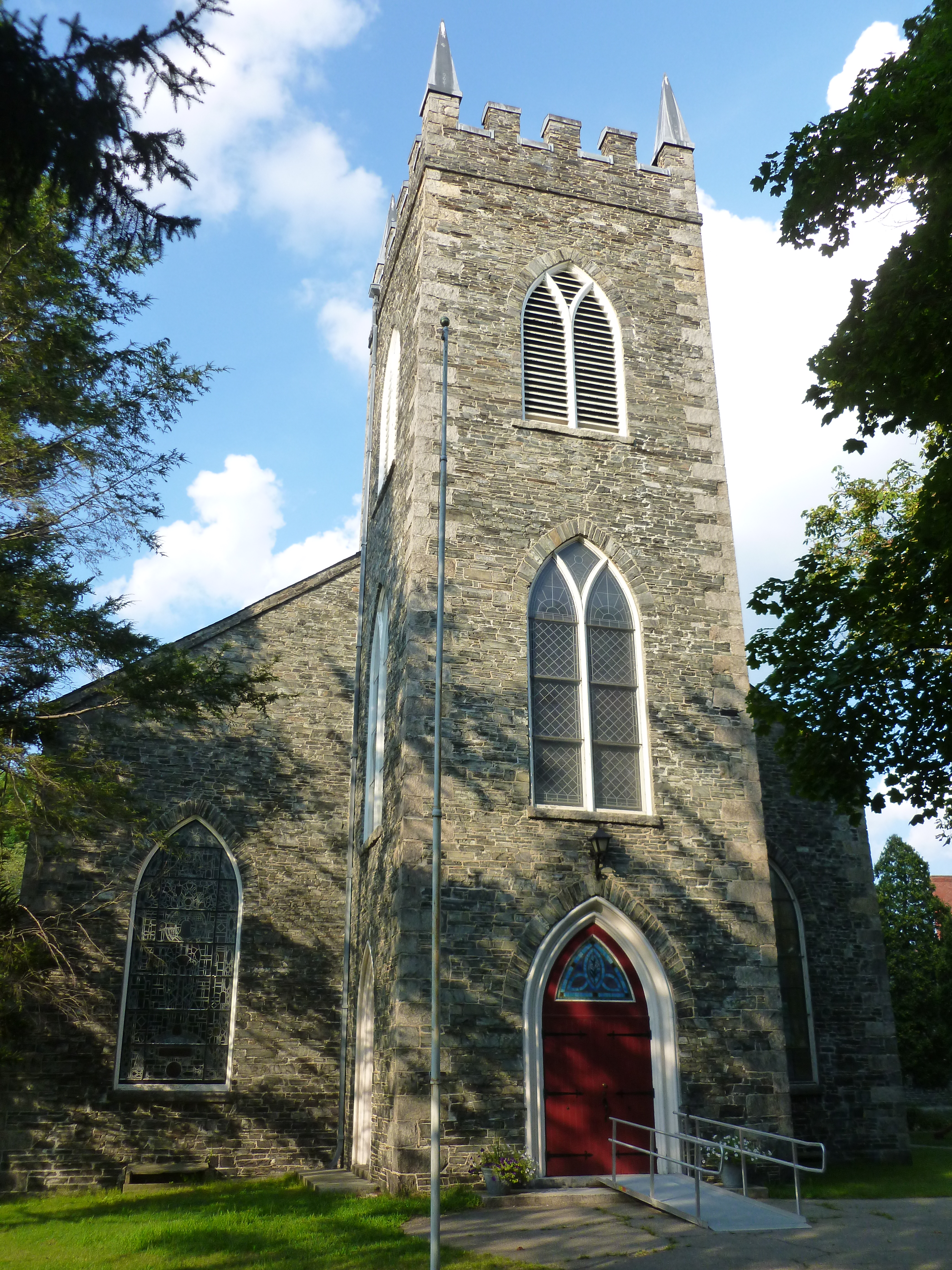
Saint Anne's Episcopal Church, built 1824

By the 1850s, Lowell had the largest industrial complex in the United States. The textile industry wove cotton produced in the Southern United States. In 1860, there were more cotton spindles in Lowell than in all eleven states combined that would form the Confederate States of America. Many of the coarse cottons produced in Lowell eventually returned to the South to clothe enslaved people, and, according to historian Sven Beckert, "'Lowell' became the generic term slaves used to describe coarse cottons." The city continued to thrive as a major industrial center during the 19th century, attracting more migrant workers and immigrants to its mills. Next were the Catholic Germans, followed by a large influx of French Canadians during the 1870s and 1880s. Later waves of immigrants came to work in Lowell and settled in ethnic neighborhoods, with the city's population reaching almost 50% foreign-born by 1900. By the time World War I broke out in Europe, the city had reached its economic peak.

In 1922, it was affected by the 1922 New England Textile Strike, shutting down the mills in the city over an attempted wage cut.

The Mill Cities' manufacturing base declined as companies began to relocate to the South in the 1920s. The city fell into hard times, and was even referred to as a "depressed industrial desert" by Harper's Magazine in 1931, as the Great Depression worsened. At this time, more than one third of its population was "on relief" (government assistance), as only three of its major textile corporations remained active. Several years later, the mills were reactivated, making parachutes and other military necessities for World War II. However, this economic boost was short-lived and the post-war years saw the last textile plants close.

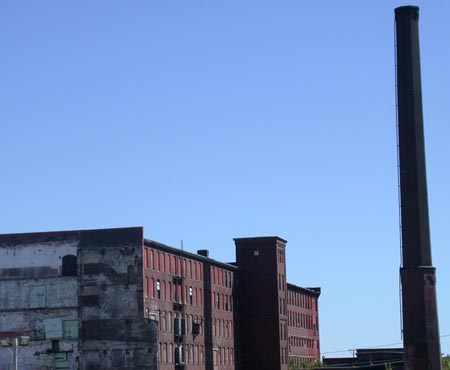
Mills sat abandoned after industry left the city in the early twentieth century.

=== Zoning, development and the Massachusetts Miracle ===
In the 1970s, Lowell became part of the Massachusetts Miracle, being the headquarters of Wang Laboratories. At the same time, in part because many immigrants fled from Cambodia due to the genocide committed by the Khmer Rouge, Lowell became home to thousands of new immigrants, bolstering its population and workforce. The city continued to rebound, but this time, focusing more on culture. The former mill district along the river was partially restored and became part of the Lowell National Historical Park, founded in the late 1970s.

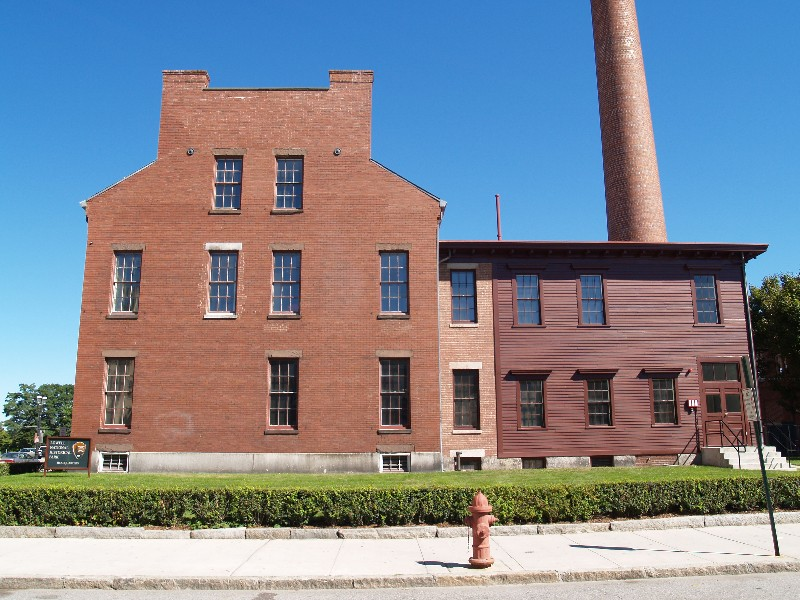
Former mill agent's house

Although Wang went bankrupt in 1992, the city continued its cultural focus by hosting the nation's largest free folk festival, the Lowell Folk Festival, as well as many other cultural events. This effort began to attract other companies and families back to the urban center. Additional historic manufacturing and commercial buildings were adapted as residential units and office space. By the 1990s, Lowell had built a new ballpark and arena, which became home to two minor league sports teams, the Lowell Devils and Lowell Spinners. The city also began to have a larger student population. The University of Massachusetts Lowell and Middlesex Community College expanded their programs and enrollment. During the period of time when Lowell was part of the Massachusetts Miracle, the Lowell City Development Authority created a Comprehensive Master Plan which included recommendations for zoning adaptations within the city. The city's original zoning code was adopted in 1926 and was significantly revised in 1966 and 2004, with changes included to respond to concerns about overdevelopment.

In 2002, in lieu of updating the Comprehensive Master Plan, more broad changes were recommended so that the land use and development would be consistent with the current master plan. The most significant revision to the 1966 zoning code is the adoption of an inclusion of a transect-based zoning code and some aspects of a form-based code style of zoning that emphasizes urban design elements as a means to ensure that infill development will respect the character of the neighborhood or district in question. By 2004, the recommended zoning changes were unanimously adopted by the City Council and despite numerous changes to the 2004 Zoning Code, it remains the basic framework for resolving zoning issues in Lowell to this day.

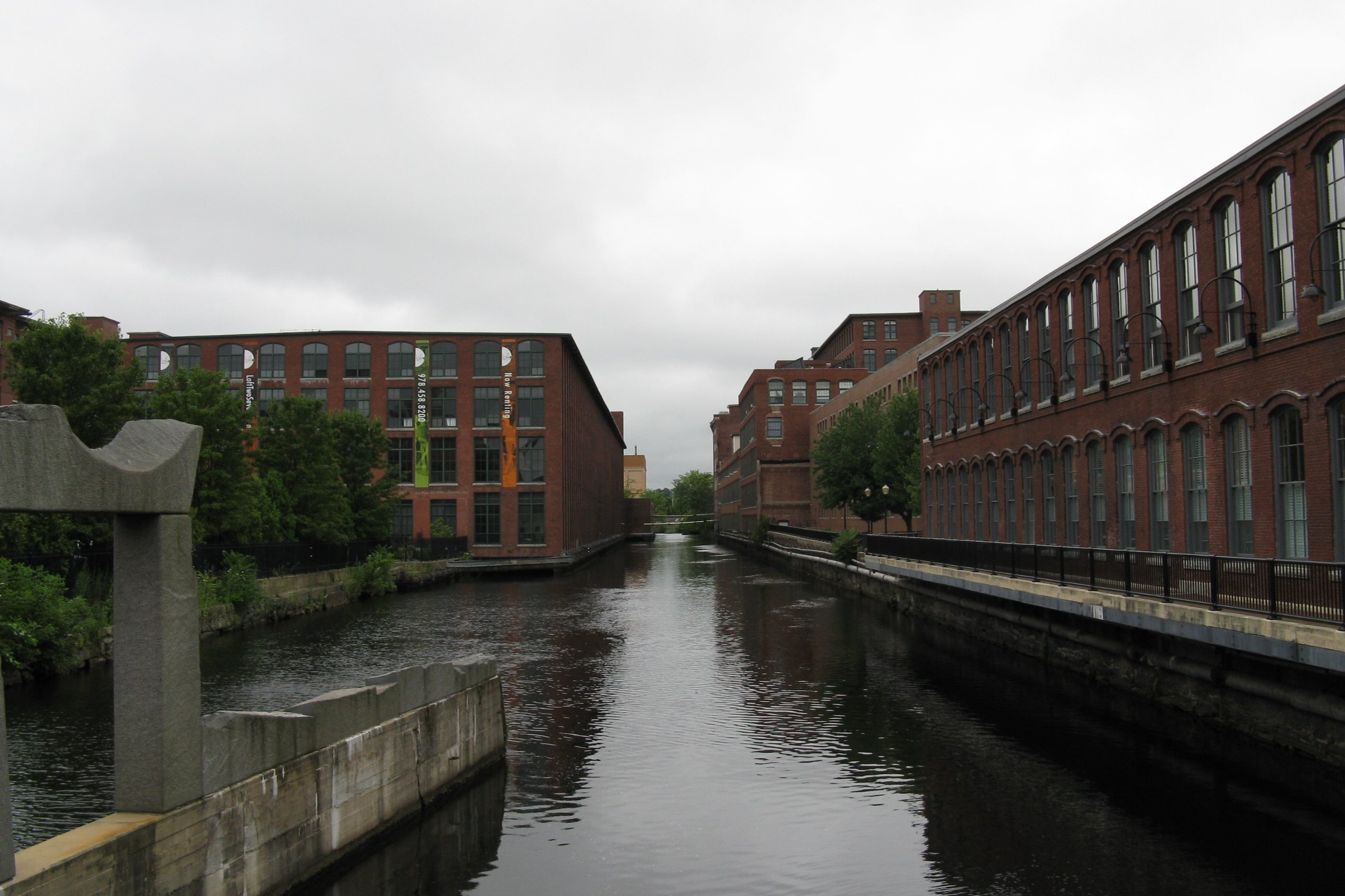
Pawtucket Canal

The Hamilton Canal District (HCD) is the first district in Lowell in which regulation and development is defined by Form-Based Code (HCD-FBC) and legislated by its own guiding framework consistent to the HCD Master Plan. The HCD is a major redevelopment project that comprises 13 acres of vacant, underutilized land in downtown Lowell abutting former industrial mills. Trinity Financial was elected as the Master Developer to recreate this district with a vision of making a mixed-use neighborhood. Development plans included establishing the HCD as a gateway to downtown Lowell and enhanced connectivity to Gallagher Terminal.

=== Anti-crime efforts ===
In the 1990s, Lowell had been locally notorious for being a place of high drug trafficking and gang activity, and was the setting for a real life documentary, High on Crack Street: Lost Lives in Lowell. Between the years 1994–1999, crime dropped 50%, which was the highest rate of decrease for any American city with over 100,000 residents.

== Geography ==
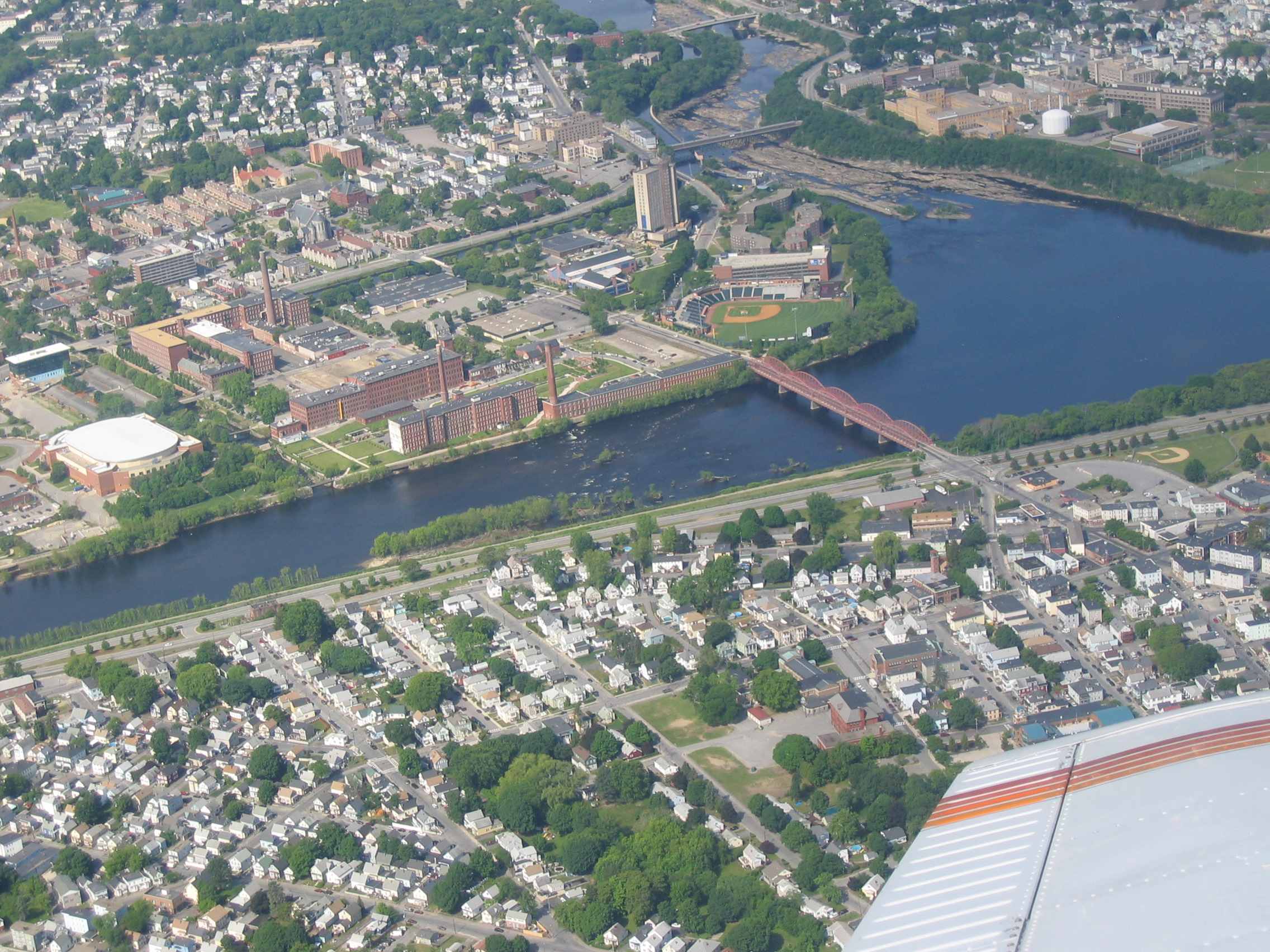
Aerial view of LeLacheur Park and the UMass-Lowell campus

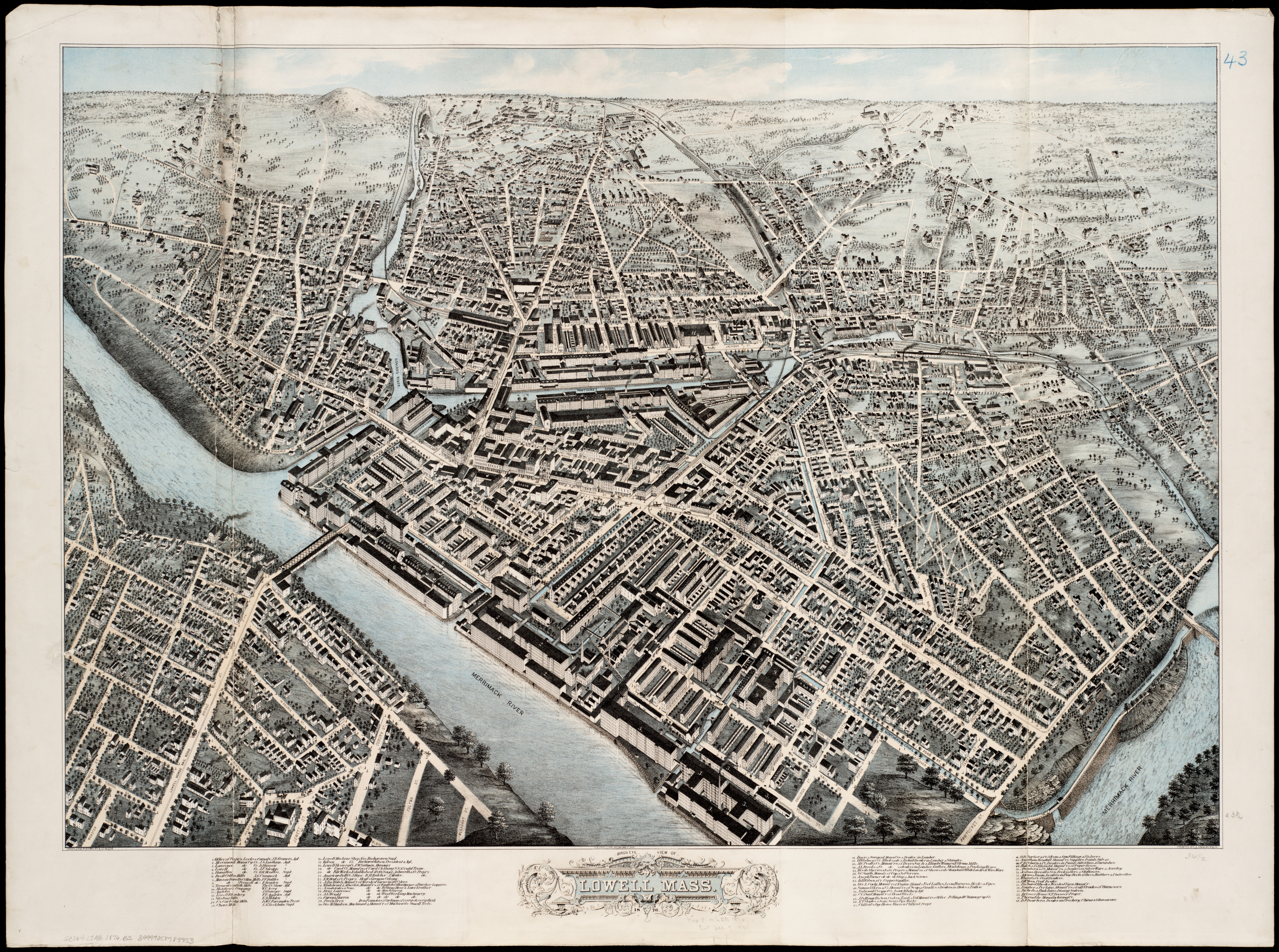
Lowell in 1876

Lowell is located at 42°38′22″N 71°18′53″W (42.639444, −71.314722). According to the United States Census Bureau, the city has a total area of 14.5 square miles (38 km^{2}) of which 13.8 square miles (36 km^{2}) is land and 0.8 square miles (2.1 km^{2}) (5.23%) is water.

=== Climate ===
Lowell features a four-season Humid continental climate, with long and cold winters, which typically experience an average 56 in (1,400 mm) of snowfall, with the highest ever recorded seasonal snowfall being 120 in (3,000 mm) in the winter of 2014–2015. Summers are hot and humid, and of average length, while autumn and spring are brief transition periods between the two. On average, temperature in Lowell ranges from 64 to 84 °F (18 to 29 °C) in the summer months, and between 2 and 33 °F (−17 and 1 °C) in the winter months, with the yearly average being 49 °F (9 °C).

Climate data for Lowell, Massachusetts (1991–2020 normals, extremes 1885–present)
Month	Jan	Feb	Mar	Apr	May	Jun	Jul	Aug	Sep	Oct	Nov	Dec	Year
Record high °F (°C)	70 (21)	77 (25)	89 (32)	96 (36)	98 (37)	103 (39)	103 (39)	103 (39)	100 (38)	89 (32)	81 (27)	76 (24)	103 (39)
Mean maximum °F (°C)	56.1 (13.4)	58.0 (14.4)	68.3 (20.2)	82.9 (28.3)	90.2 (32.3)	94.1 (34.5)	95.5 (35.3)	93.8 (34.3)	90.0 (32.2)	79.8 (26.6)	69.9 (21.1)	60.1 (15.6)	97.5 (36.4)
Mean daily maximum °F (°C)	34.0 (1.1)	37.3 (2.9)	45.4 (7.4)	59.0 (15.0)	70.0 (21.1)	79.0 (26.1)	84.7 (29.3)	83.0 (28.3)	75.5 (24.2)	62.4 (16.9)	50.5 (10.3)	39.8 (4.3)	60.0 (15.6)
Daily mean °F (°C)	24.9 (−3.9)	27.1 (−2.7)	34.9 (1.6)	46.8 (8.2)	57.5 (14.2)	67.0 (19.4)	72.8 (22.7)	71.1 (21.7)	63.5 (17.5)	50.9 (10.5)	40.4 (4.7)	31.0 (−0.6)	49.0 (9.4)
Mean daily minimum °F (°C)	15.8 (−9.0)	16.9 (−8.4)	24.4 (−4.2)	34.6 (1.4)	45.0 (7.2)	55.0 (12.8)	60.9 (16.1)	59.3 (15.2)	51.5 (10.8)	39.5 (4.2)	30.3 (−0.9)	22.1 (−5.5)	37.9 (3.3)
Mean minimum °F (°C)	−2.4 (−19.1)	0.7 (−17.4)	8.2 (−13.2)	23.9 (−4.5)	33.4 (0.8)	43.3 (6.3)	51.9 (11.1)	49.8 (9.9)	37.6 (3.1)	26.5 (−3.1)	17.0 (−8.3)	5.8 (−14.6)	−5.0 (−20.6)
Record low °F (°C)	−22 (−30)	−29 (−34)	−14 (−26)	6 (−14)	27 (−3)	33 (1)	44 (7)	38 (3)	26 (−3)	19 (−7)	1 (−17)	−20 (−29)	−29 (−34)
Average precipitation inches (mm)	3.61 (92)	3.20 (81)	4.32 (110)	4.06 (103)	3.81 (97)	4.37 (111)	3.86 (98)	4.00 (102)	3.89 (99)	5.00 (127)	3.85 (98)	4.54 (115)	48.51 (1,233)
Average snowfall inches (cm)	15.9 (40)	14.2 (36)	11.2 (28)	1.9 (4.8)	0.0 (0.0)	0.0 (0.0)	0.0 (0.0)	0.0 (0.0)	0.0 (0.0)	0.0 (0.0)	1.5 (3.8)	11.4 (29)	56.1 (141.6)
Average extreme snow depth inches (cm)	10.7 (27)	11.2 (28)	9.8 (25)	1.3 (3.3)	0.0 (0.0)	0.0 (0.0)	0.0 (0.0)	0.0 (0.0)	0.0 (0.0)	0.1 (0.25)	1.2 (3.0)	8.0 (20)	17.5 (44)
Average precipitation days (≥ 0.01 in)	10.9	9.2	10.6	11.2	12.7	11.3	10.4	9.7	9.2	10.9	10.5	10.7	127.3
Average snowy days (≥ 0.1 in)	6.3	5.2	3.6	0.8	0.0	0.0	0.0	0.0	0.0	0.1	1.0	3.8	20.8
Source 1: NOAA
Source 2: National Weather Service

=== Physical ===
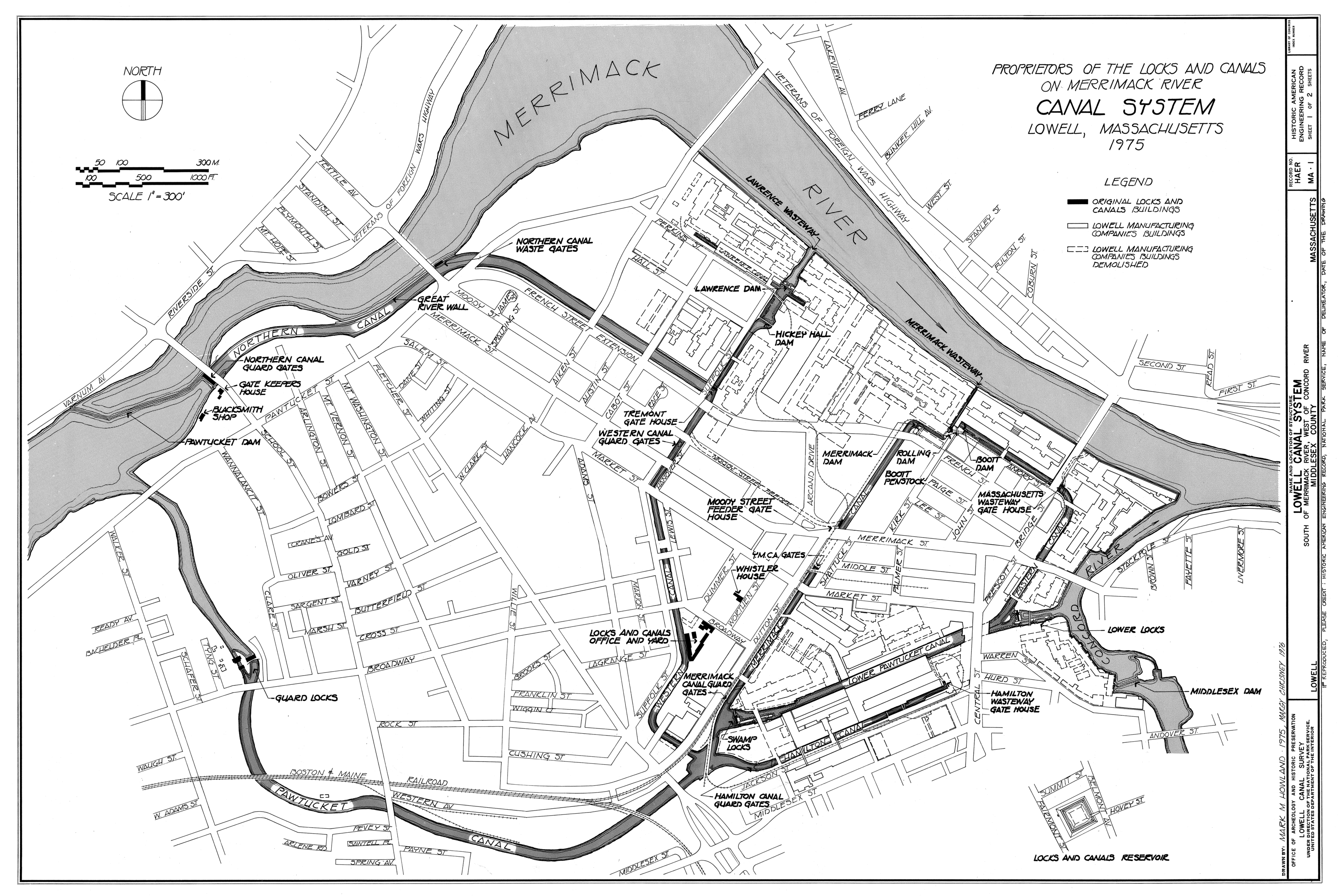
Central Lowell's canal system (1975). The city limits extend in all directions from this central core.

Lowell is located at the confluence of the Merrimack and Concord rivers. The Pawtucket Falls, a mile-long set of rapids with a total drop in elevation of 10 meters or 32 feet, ends where the two rivers meet. At the top of the falls is the Pawtucket Dam, designed to turn the upper Merrimack into a millpond, diverted through Lowell's extensive canal system.

The Merrimack, which flows southerly from Franklin, New Hampshire to Lowell, makes a northeasterly turn there before emptying into the Atlantic Ocean at Newburyport, Massachusetts, approximately 40 miles (64 km) downriver from Lowell. It is believed that in prior ages, the Merrimack continued south from Lowell to empty into the ocean somewhere near Boston. The glacial deposits that redirected the flow of the river left the drumlins that dot the city, most notably, Fort Hill in the Belvidere neighborhood. Other large hills in Lowell include Lynde Hill, also in Belvidere, and Christian Hill, in the easternmost part of Centralville at the Dracut town line.

The Concord, or Musketaquid (its original name), forms from the confluence of the Assabet and Sudbury rivers at Concord, Massachusetts. This river flows north into the city, and the area around the confluence with the Merrimack was known as Wamesit. Like the Merrimack, the Concord, although a much smaller river, has many waterfalls and rapids that served as power sources for early industrial purposes, some well before the founding of Lowell. Immediately after the Concord joins the Merrimack, the Merrimack descends another ten feet in Hunt's Falls.

There is a ninety-degree bend in the Merrimack partway down the Pawtucket Falls. At this point, the river briefly widens and shallows. Here, Beaver Brook enters from the north, separating the city's two northern neighborhoods, Pawtucketville and Centralville. Entering the Concord River from the southwest is River Meadow, or Hale's Brook. This brook flows largely in a man-made channel, as the Lowell Connector was built along it. Both of these minor streams have limited industrial histories as well.

The bordering towns (clockwise from north) are Dracut, Tewksbury, Billerica, Chelmsford, and Tyngsborough. The border with Billerica is a point in the middle of the Concord River where Lowell and Billerica meet Tewksbury and Chelmsford.

The ten communities designated part of the Lowell Metropolitan area by the 2000 US Census are Billerica, Chelmsford, Dracut, Dunstable, Groton, Lowell, Pepperell, Tewksbury, Tyngsborough, and Westford, and Pelham, New Hampshire. See Greater Lowell.

=== Neighborhoods ===
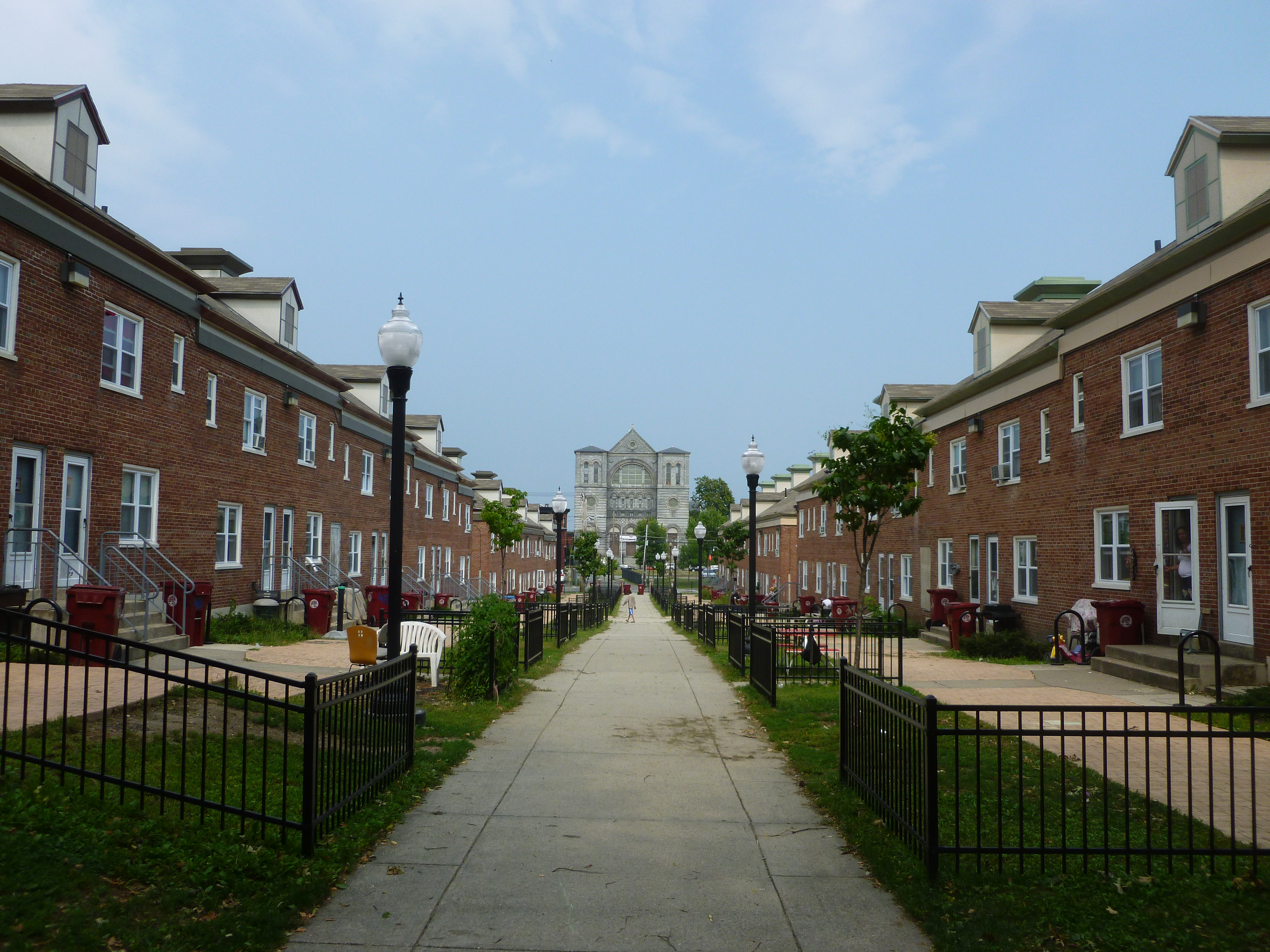
The Acre neighborhood

Lowell has eight distinct neighborhoods: the Acre, Back Central, Belvidere, Centralville, Downtown, Highlands, Pawtucketville, and South Lowell. The city also has five ZIP codes: four are geographically distinct general ZIP codes, and one (01853) is for post-office boxes only.

The Centralville neighborhood, ZIP Code 01850, is the northeastern section of the city, north of the Merrimack River and east of Beaver Brook. Christian Hill is the section of Centralville east of Bridge Street.

The Highlands, ZIP Code 01851, is the most populated neighborhood, with almost a quarter of the city residing here. It is located in the southwestern section of the city, bordered to the east by the Lowell Connector and to the north by the railroad. Lowellians further distinguish the sections of the Highlands as the Upper Highlands and the Lower Highlands, the latter being the area closer to downtown. Middlesex Village, Tyler Park, and Drum Hill are in this ZIP Code. The Upper Highlands also includes the University of Massachusetts Lowell, South Campus (Fine Arts, Humanities, Social Sciences, Health Sciences & Education).

Downtown, Belvidere, Back Central, and South Lowell make up the 01852 ZIP Code, and are the southeastern sections of the city (south of the Merrimack River and southeast of the Lowell Connector). Belvidere is the mostly residential area south of the Merrimack River, east of the Concord River, and north of the Lowell and Lawrence railroad. Belvidere Hill Historic District runs along Fairmount Street. Lower Belvidere is the section west of Nesmith Street. Rogers Fort Hill Park Historic District, Lowell Cemetery, and Shedd Park are this side of town. Back Central is an urban area south of downtown, toward the mouth of River Meadow Brook. South Lowell is the area south of the railroad and east of the Concord River. Other minor neighborhoods within this ZIP Code are Ayers City, Bleachery, Chapel Hill, the Grove, Oaklands, Riverside Park, Swede Village, and Wigginville. Although the use of the names of these smaller neighborhoods has been in decline in the past decades, there has been recently a reemergence of their use. Downtown Lowell includes the UMass Lowell East Campus which consists of university housing, recreation facilities, research and the university's sports arena, as well as the Middlesex Community College.

Pawtucketville, the University of Massachusetts Lowell, North Campus; and the Acre make up the 01854 ZIP Code. The northwestern portion of the city includes the neighborhood where Jack Kerouac resided around the area of University Avenue (previously known as Moody Street). The North Campus of UMass Lowell (Colleges of Engineering, Sciences and Business) is in Pawtucketville near the Lowell General Hospital. The older parts of the neighborhood are around University Avenue and Mammoth Road, whereas the newer parts are around Varnum Avenue. Pawtucketville is the official entrance to the Lowell-Dracut-Tyngsborough State Forest, the site of an historic Native American tribe, and in the age of the Industrial Revolution was a prominent source of granite used in canals and factory foundations.

== Demographics ==
Historical population
Year	Pop.	±%
1830	6,474	—
1840	20,796	+221.2%
1850	33,383	+60.5%
1860	36,827	+10.3%
1870	40,928	+11.1%
1880	59,475	+45.3%
1890	77,696	+30.6%
1900	94,969	+22.2%
1910	106,294	+11.9%
1920	112,759	+6.1%
1930	100,234	−11.1%
1940	101,389	+1.2%
1950	97,249	−4.1%
1960	92,107	−5.3%
1970	94,239	+2.3%
1980	92,418	−1.9%
1990	103,439	+11.9%
2000	105,167	+1.7%
2010	106,519	+1.3%
2020	115,554	+8.5%
2024*	120,418	+4.2%
* = population estimate. Source: United States census records and Population Estimates Program data. Source: U.S. Decennial Census

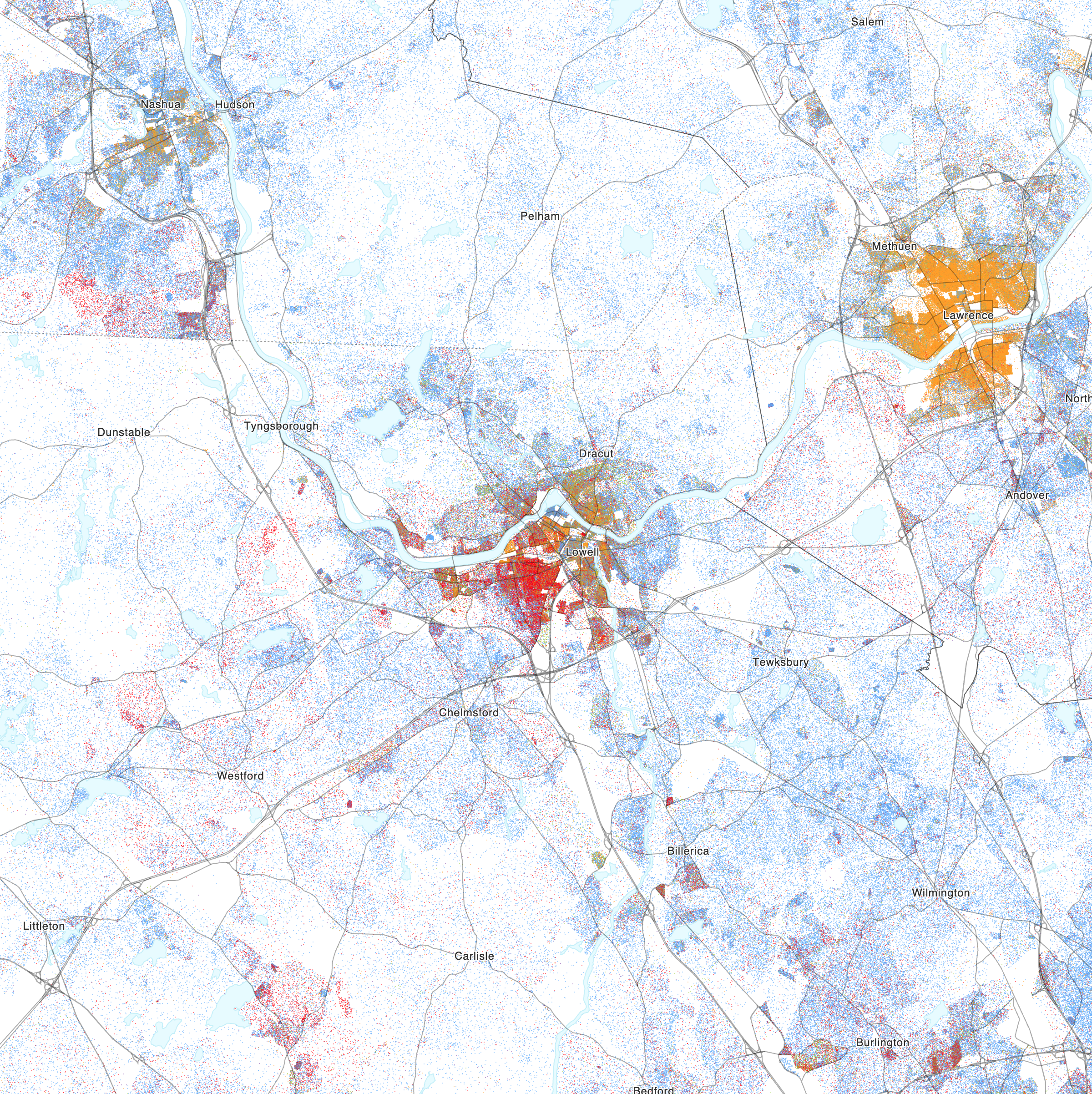
Map of racial distribution in Lowell, 2020 U.S. census. Each dot is one person: ⬤ White ⬤ Black ⬤ Asian ⬤ Hispanic ⬤ Multiracial ⬤ Native American/Other

=== 2020 census ===
Lowell, Massachusetts – Racial and ethnic composition Note: the US Census treats Hispanic/Latino as an ethnic category. This table excludes Latinos from the racial categories and assigns them to a separate category. Hispanics/Latinos may be of any race.
Race / Ethnicity (NH = Non-Hispanic)	Pop 2000	Pop 2010	Pop 2020	% 2000	% 2010	% 2020
White (NH)	65,760	56,280	46,908	62.53%	52.84%	40.59%
Black or African American (NH)	3,644	6,367	9,570	3.46%	5.98%	8.28%
Native American or Alaska Native (NH)	170	137	111	0.16%	0.13%	0.10%
Asian (NH)	17,302	21,337	25,548	16.45%	20.03%	22.11%
Pacific Islander or Native Hawaiian (NH)	12	34	56	0.01%	0.03%	0.05%
Some other race (NH)	474	1,554	2,494	0.45%	1.46%	2.16%
Mixed race or Multiracial (NH)	3,071	2,414	5,816	2.92%	2.27%	5.03%
Hispanic or Latino (any race)	14,734	18,396	25,051	14.01%	17.27%	21.68%
Total	105,167	106,519	115,554	100.00%	100.00%	100.00%

=== Population density ===
According to the 2010 Census, there were 106,519 people living in the city. The population density was 7,842.1 inhabitants per square mile (3,027.9/km^{2}). There were 41,431 housing units at an average density of 2,865.5/sq mi (1,106.4/km^{2}).

=== Household size ===
In 2010, there were 38,470 households, and 23,707 families living in Lowell; the average household size was 2.66 and the average family size was 3.31. Of those households, 34.9% had children under the age of 18 living with them, 35.9% were married couples living together, 14.7% had a female householder with no husband present, 38.4% were non-families, 29.4% of all households were made up of individuals, and 8.3% had someone living alone who was 65 years of age or older.

=== Age distributions ===
Lowell has also experienced a significant increase in the number of residents between the ages of 50–69, while the percentages of residents under the age of 15 and over the age of 70 decreased. In 2010 the city's population had a median age of 32.6. The age distribution was 23.7% of the population under the age of 18, 13.5% from 18 to 24, 29.4% from 25 to 44, 23.3% from 45 to 64, and 10.1% who were 65 years of age or older. For every 100 females, there were 98.6 males; while for every 100 females age 18 and over, there were 97.6 males.

=== Median income ===
For a household in the city was $51,714, according to the American Community Survey 5-year estimate ending in 2012. The median income for a family was $55,852. Males had a median income of $44,739 versus $35,472 for females. The per capita income for the city was $22,730. About 15.2% of families and 17.5% of individuals were below the poverty line, including 24.5% of those under age 18 and 13.2% of those age 65 or over.

=== Racial makeup ===
In 2010, the ethnic diversity of the city was 60.3% White (49.3% Non-Hispanic White), 20.2% Asian American (12.5% Cambodian, 2.0% Indian, 1.7% Vietnamese, 1.4% Laotian), 6.8% African American, 0.3% Native American, 8.8% from other races, 3.6% from two or more races. Hispanic or Latino of any race were 17.3% of the population. The largest Hispanic group was those of Puerto Rican ancestry, constituting 11.3% of the population. In 2020, the most commonly reported ancestries were Cambodian (15%), Irish (14.1%), Puerto Rican (11.1%), English (7%), French (6.1%), and Italian (5.2%).

==== Southeast Asian population ====
In 2010, Lowell had the highest proportion of residents of Cambodian origin of any place in the United States at 12.5% of the population. The Government of Cambodia opened up its third U.S. Consular Office in Lowell, on April 27, 2009. The other consular offices are in Long Beach, California, and Seattle, Washington, which also have large Cambodian-American communities. In 2022, Lowell elected Sokhary Chau, the first Cambodian-American mayor in the United States.

In 1999, the municipality had significant numbers of Hmong, lowland Lao, and Vietnamese people.

== Arts and culture ==
=== Annual events ===
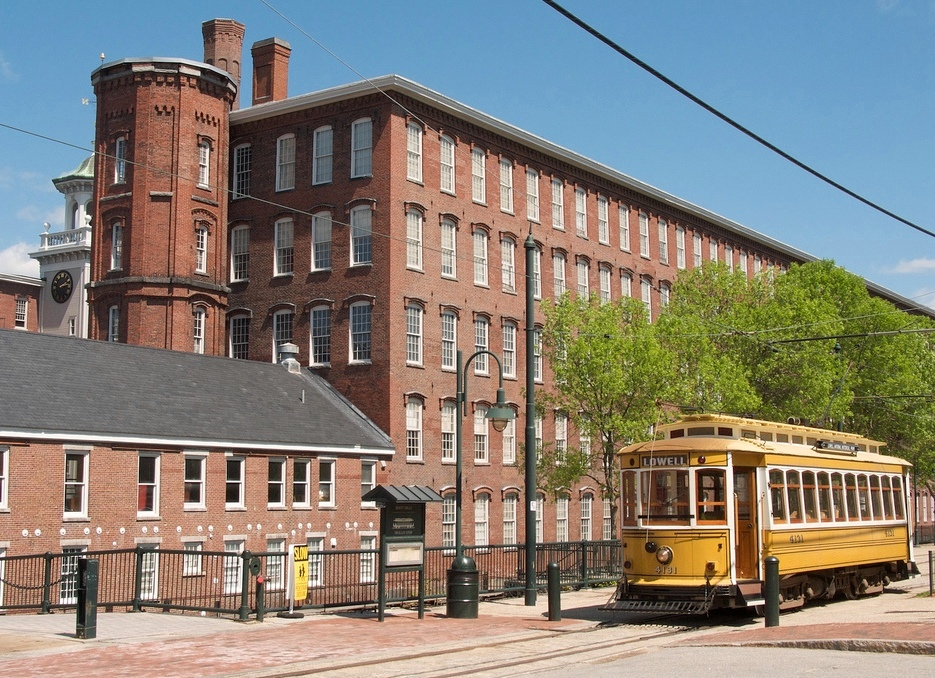
The Boott Cotton Mill Museum and Trolley

- February: Winterfest – celebration of winter. (Also, Lowell's Birthday)
- March: Lowell Women's Week – A week of events recognizing women's achievements, struggles, and contributions to the Lowell community past and present. Irish Cultural Week – A celebration of Irish history and culture within the Greater Lowell community.
- April: Lowell Film Festival – Showcases documentary and feature-length films focusing on a variety of topics of interest to the Greater Lowell community and beyond
- May: Doors Open Lowell – A celebration of preservation, architecture, and design where many historic buildings that normally have limited public access are open for viewing
- June: African Festival – A celebration of the various African communities in and around Lowell
- July: Lowell Folk Festival – A three-day free folk music and traditional arts festival attended by on average 250,000 people on the last weekend in July
- August: Lowell Southeast Asian Water Festival – celebrates Southeast Asian culture
- September: Lowell Kinetic Sculpture Race – From the crossroads of Science, Technology, Engineering, Art and Mathematics comes a spectacular racing spectacle!
- October: Lowell Celebrates Kerouac Festival – A celebration of the works of Jack Kerouac and his roots in the city of Lowell
- October: Bay State Marathon and half marathon

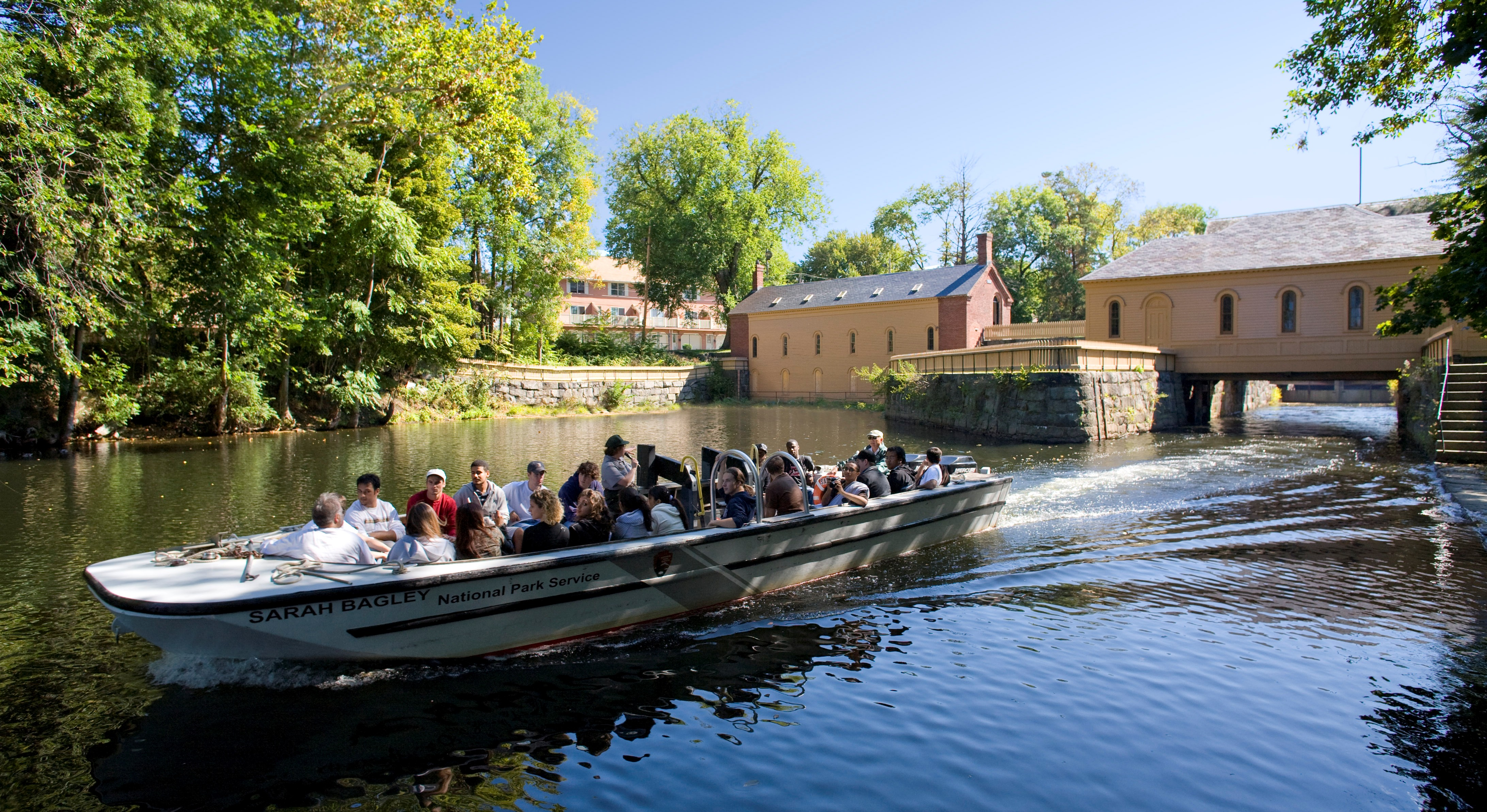
The National Park Boat Tour

=== Points of interest ===
Among the many tourist attractions, Lowell also currently has 39 places on the National Register of Historic Places including many buildings and structures as part of the Lowell National Historical Park.

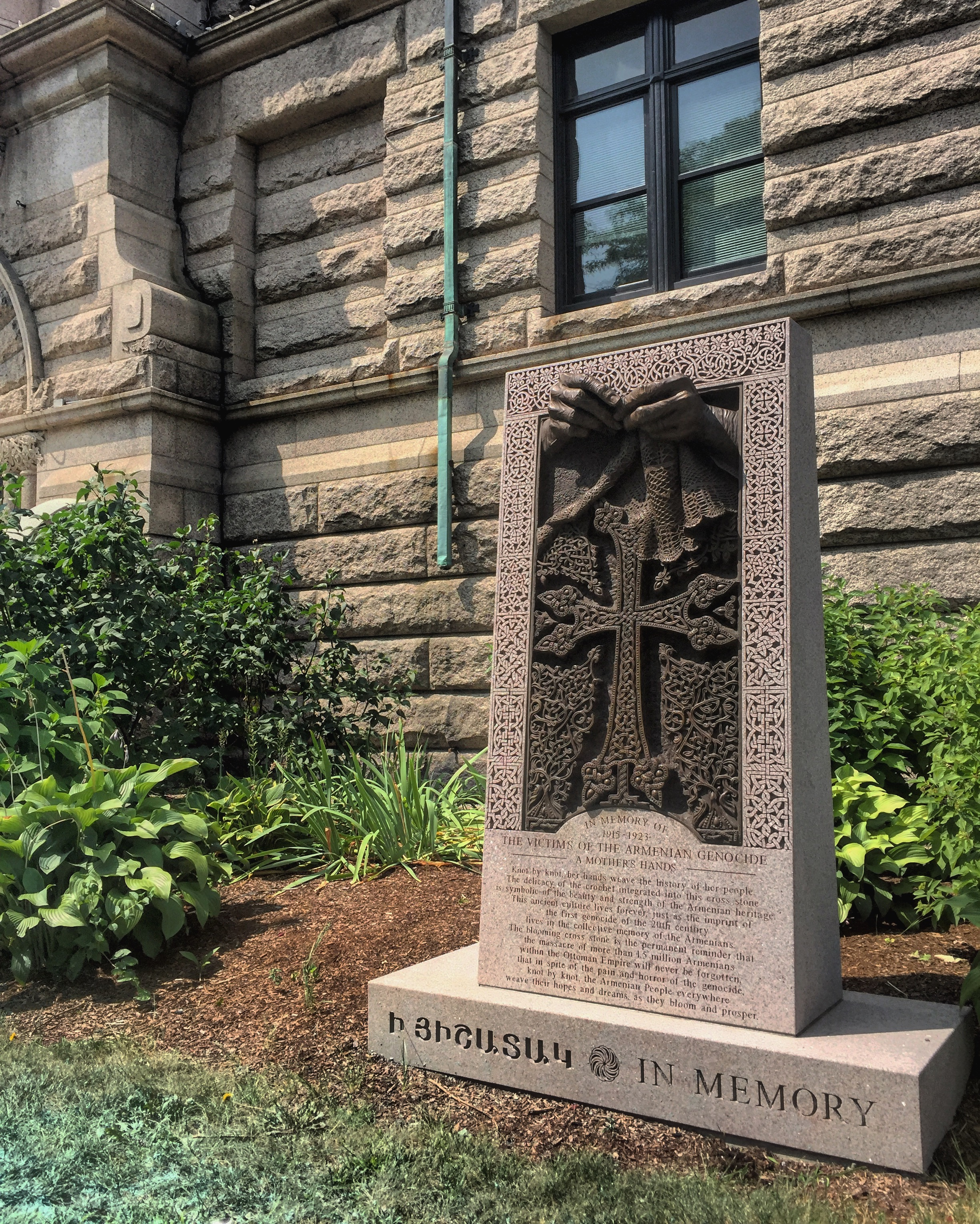
"A Mother's Hands" Armenian Genocide memorial outside of Lowell City Hall

- In the mid-1980s, Kerouac Park was placed in downtown.
- Lowell National Historical Park: Maintains Lowell's history as an early manufacturing and immigrant city. Exhibits include weave rooms, a waterpower exhibit, and paths along 5.6 miles (9.0 km) of largely restored canals.
- Lowell-Dracut-Tyngsboro State Forest: Hiking, biking, and cross-country skiing trails in an urban state forest
- University of Massachusetts Lowell: State University
- University of Massachusetts Lowell Radiation Laboratory: The site of a small nuclear reactor at the school
- Vandenberg Esplanade: Walking, biking, swimming, and picnicking park along the banks of the Merrimack River. Contains the Sampas Pavilion.
- Western Avenue Studios: Largest complex of artists studios in the United States at 122 Western Avenue.
- Jack Kerouac's birthplace: In the Centralville section of the city at 9 Lupine Road.
- Armenian genocide memorial: "A Mother's Hands" monument at Lowell City Hall.
- Bette Davis's birthplace: In the Highlands section of the city at 22 Chester Street.
- Rosalind Elias's birthplace: In the Acre neighborhood at 144 School Street .
- Lowell Cemetery: burial site of many of Lowell's wealthy industrialists from the Victorian era, as well as several U.S. Congressmen, a Massachusetts Governor, John McFarland, and a U.S. Senator. 77 Knapp Avenue.
- Edson Cemetery: burial site of Jack Kerouac and William Preston Phelps. Location of a monument dedicated to Chief Passaconaway. 1375 Gorham Street.
- The Acre: Lowell's gateway neighborhood where waves of immigrants have established their communities.
- Yorick Building: Former home of the gentlemen's club the "Yorick Club", currently a restaurant & function facility (Cobblestones).
- Little Cambodia: In 2010, the city began an effort to make it a tourist destination.

=== Culture ===
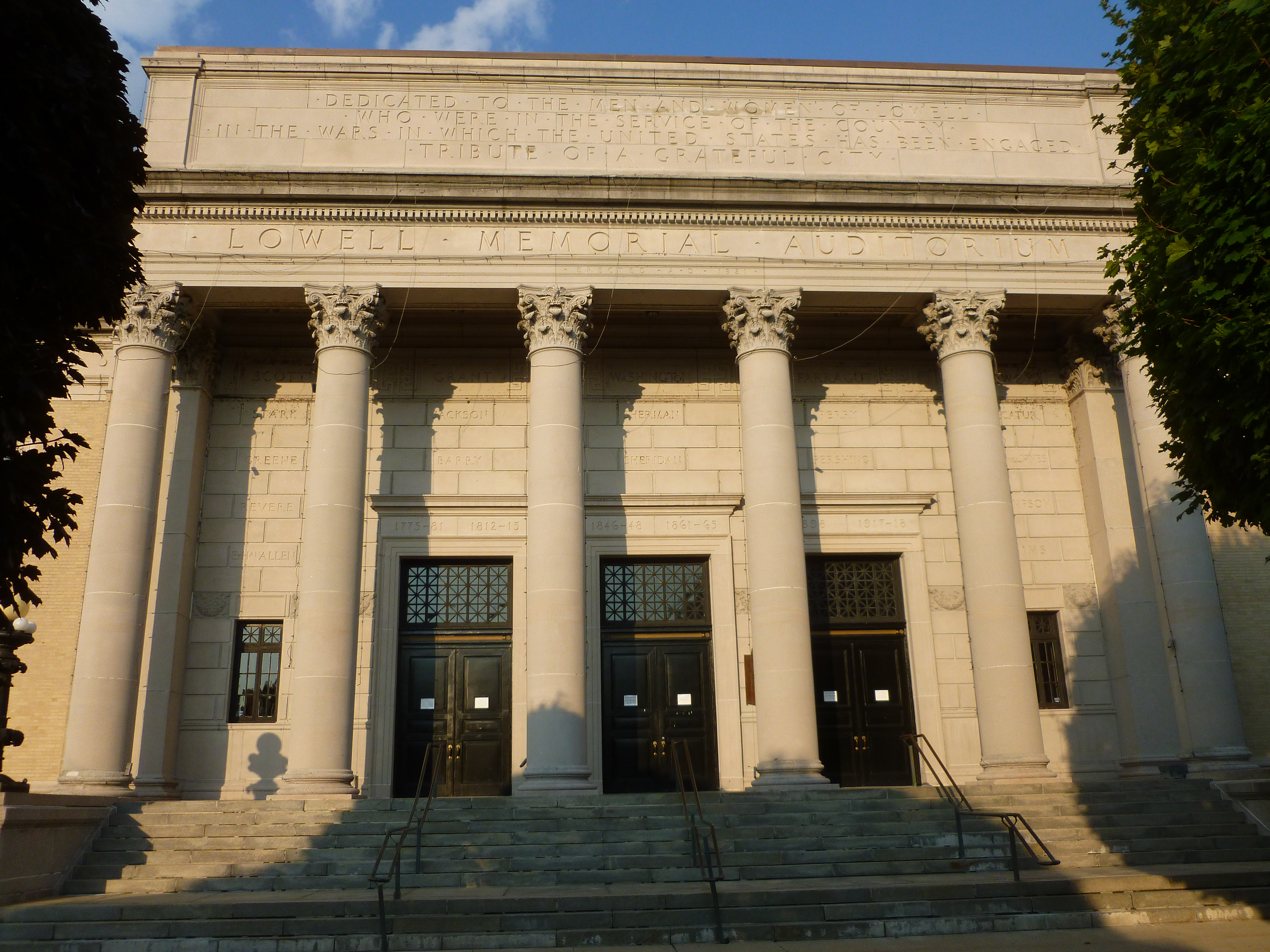
Lowell Memorial Auditorium

In the early years of the 1840s when the population quickly exceeded 20,000, Lowell became very active as a cultural center, with the construction of the Lowell Museum, the Mechanics Hall, as well as the new City Hall used for art exhibits, lectures, and for the performing arts. The Lowell Museum was lost in a devastating fire in the early morning of January 31, 1856, but was quickly rehoused in a new location. The Lowell Art Association was founded in 1876, and the new Opera House was built in 1889. Continuing to inspire and entertain, Lowell currently has a plethora of artistic exhibitions and performances throughout a wide range of venues in the city:

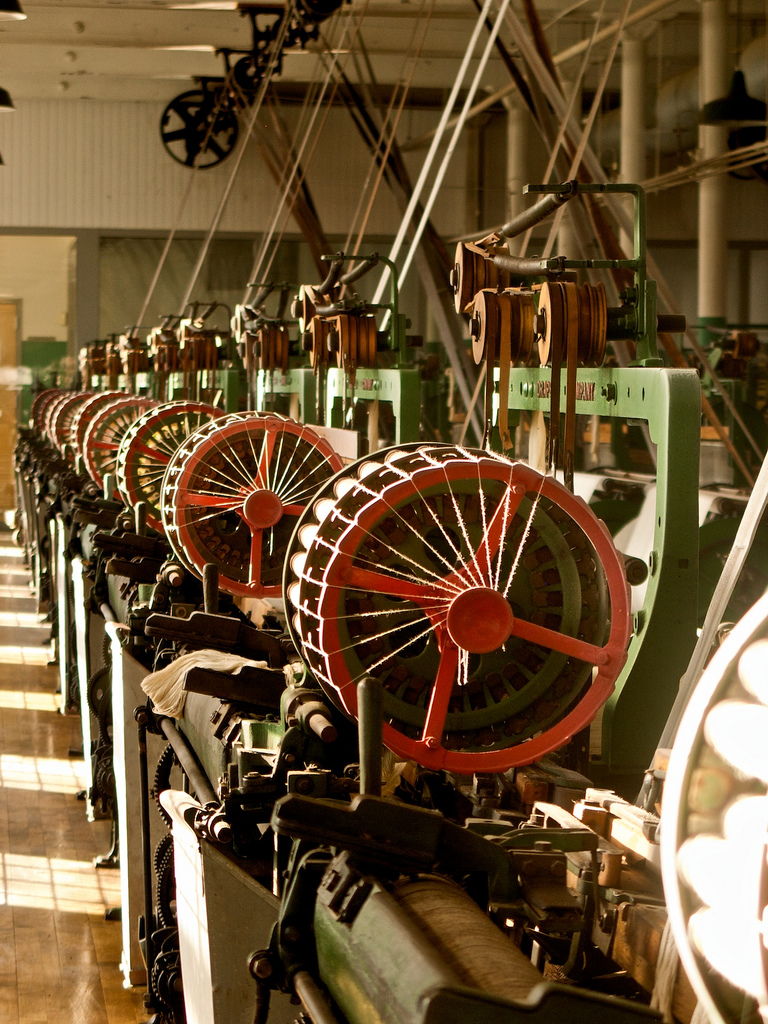
The Boott Cotton Mill and Museum

=== Museums and public galleries ===
- 119 Gallery
- Arts League of Lowell & All Gallery
- The American Textile History Museum (closed in 2016)
- Ayer Lofts Artist Live-work Lofts
- The Boott Cotton Mills Museum: Lowell National Historic Park
- Brush Art Gallery and Studios
- Gallery Z & Artist Cooperative
- The Lowell Gallery
- Mill No. 5 – an eclectic indoor mall/streetscape featuring artisanal foods and hand-made items, live music and The Luna Theater, an independent film venue.
- National Streetcar Museum
- The New England Quilt Museum
- Patrick J. Mogan Cultural Center: Lowell National Historic Park
- Whistler House Museum of Art – Art museum in birthplace of James McNeill Whistler.
- Western Avenue Studios (The Loading Dock Galleries) – A converted mill with over 300 working artists and musicians.
- UMass Lowell Galleries

=== Interactive and live performances ===
- Angkor Dance Troupe – Cambodian classical and folk dance company and youth program
- Arts League of Lowell
- Center for Lowell History, University of Massachusetts Lowell – local history library and archive
- The Gentlemen Songsters The Lowell Chapter of The Barbershop Harmony Society – Causing Harmony In The Merrimack Valley.
- Lowell Memorial Auditorium – Mid-sized venue for live performances.
- The Lowell Chamber Orchestra – First professional orchestra based in Lowell
- Lowell Philharmonic Orchestra – Community orchestra presenting free concerts and offering youth programs
- Lowell Poetry Network – A network of area poets and appreciators of poetry who host readings, receptions, and open mics.
- Lowell Rocks – Lowell nightlife and entertainment web site promoting performances at local bars and clubs
- Lowell Summer Music Series – Boarding House Park
- Merrimack Repertory Theater – Professional equity theater
- Play by Player's Theatre Company – critically acclaimed community theater
- RRRecords – Internationally known record label and store
- Sampas Pavilion – Outdoor amphitheater on the banks of the Merrimack River
- Standing Room Only Players – musical review troupe
- UMass Lowell Department of Music Performances
- The United Teen Equality Center A by teens, for teens youth center promoting peace, positivity and empowerment for young people in Lowell.
- UnchARTed – Gallery, studios, cafe, bar, and performance space in downtown Lowell

=== Libraries ===
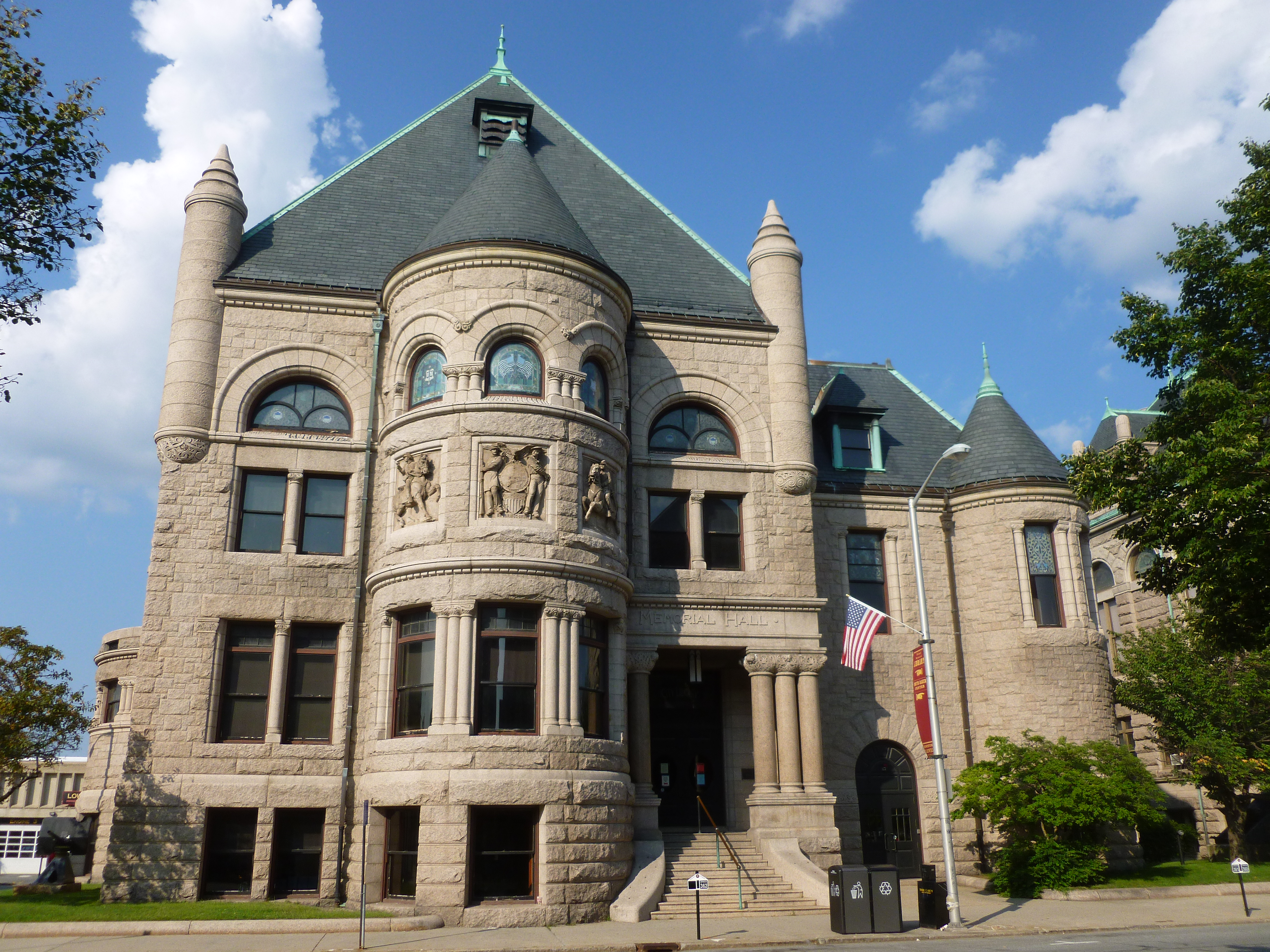
Pollard Memorial Library in August 2011

==== Municipal ====
===== Pollard Memorial Library / Lowell City Library =====
The first Lowell public library was established in 1844 with 3,500 volumes, and was set up in the first floor of the Old City Hall, 226 Merrimack St. In 1872, the expanding collection was relocated down the street to the Hosford Building at 134 Merrimack St. In 1890–1891, the City of Lowell hired local Architect Frederick W. Stickney to design the new Lowell City Library, known as "Memorial Hall, in honor of the city's men who died in the American Civil War. In 1981, the library was renamed the Pollard Memorial Library in memory of the late Mayor Samuel S. Pollard. And, in the mid-2000s the century-old National Historic building underwent a major $8.5m renovation. The city also expanded the library system to include the Senior Center Branch, located in the City of Lowell Senior Center.

In fiscal year 2008, the city of Lowell spent 0.36% ($975,845) of its budget on its public libraries, which houses 236,000 volumes, and is a part of the Merrimack Valley Library Consortium. Currently, circulation of materials averages around 250,000 annually, with approximately one-third deriving from the children's collection. In fiscal year 2009, Lowell spent 0.35% ($885,377) of its budget on the library—approximately $8 per person, per year ($9.83 adjusted for inflation in 2021).

As of 2012, the Pollard Library purchases access for its patrons to databases owned by: EBSCO Industries; Gale, of Cengage Learning; Heritage Archives, Inc.; New England Historic Genealogical Society; OverDrive, Inc.; ProQuest; and World Trade Press.

==== University ====
===== Lydon Library =====
The Lydon Library is a part of the University of Massachusetts Lowell system, and is located on the North Campus. The building is named in honor of President Martin J. Lydon, whose vision expanded and renamed the college during his tenure in the 1950s and 1960s. Its current collection concentrates on the sciences, engineering, business management, social sciences, humanities, and health.

===== O'Leary Library =====
The O'Leary Library is a part of the University of Massachusetts Lowell system, and is located on the South Campus. The building is named in honor of former History Professor and then President O'Leary, whose vision helped merge the Lowell colleges during his tenure in the 1970s and 1980s. Its current collection concentrates on music and art.

===== Center for Lowell History =====
The Center for Lowell History [special collections and archives] is a part of the University of Massachusetts Lowell system, established in 1971 to assure the safekeeping, preservation, and availability for study and research of materials in unique subject areas, particularly those related to the Greater Lowell Area and the University of Massachusetts Lowell. Located downtown in the Patrick J. Mogan Cultural Center at 40 French Street, the center is committed to the design and implementation of historical, educational, and cultural programs that link the university and the community in developing an economically strong and multi-culturally rich region. Its current collections and archives focus on historic and contemporary issues of Lowell (including: industrialization, textile technology, immigration, social history, regional history, labor history, women's history, and environmental history).

== Sports ==
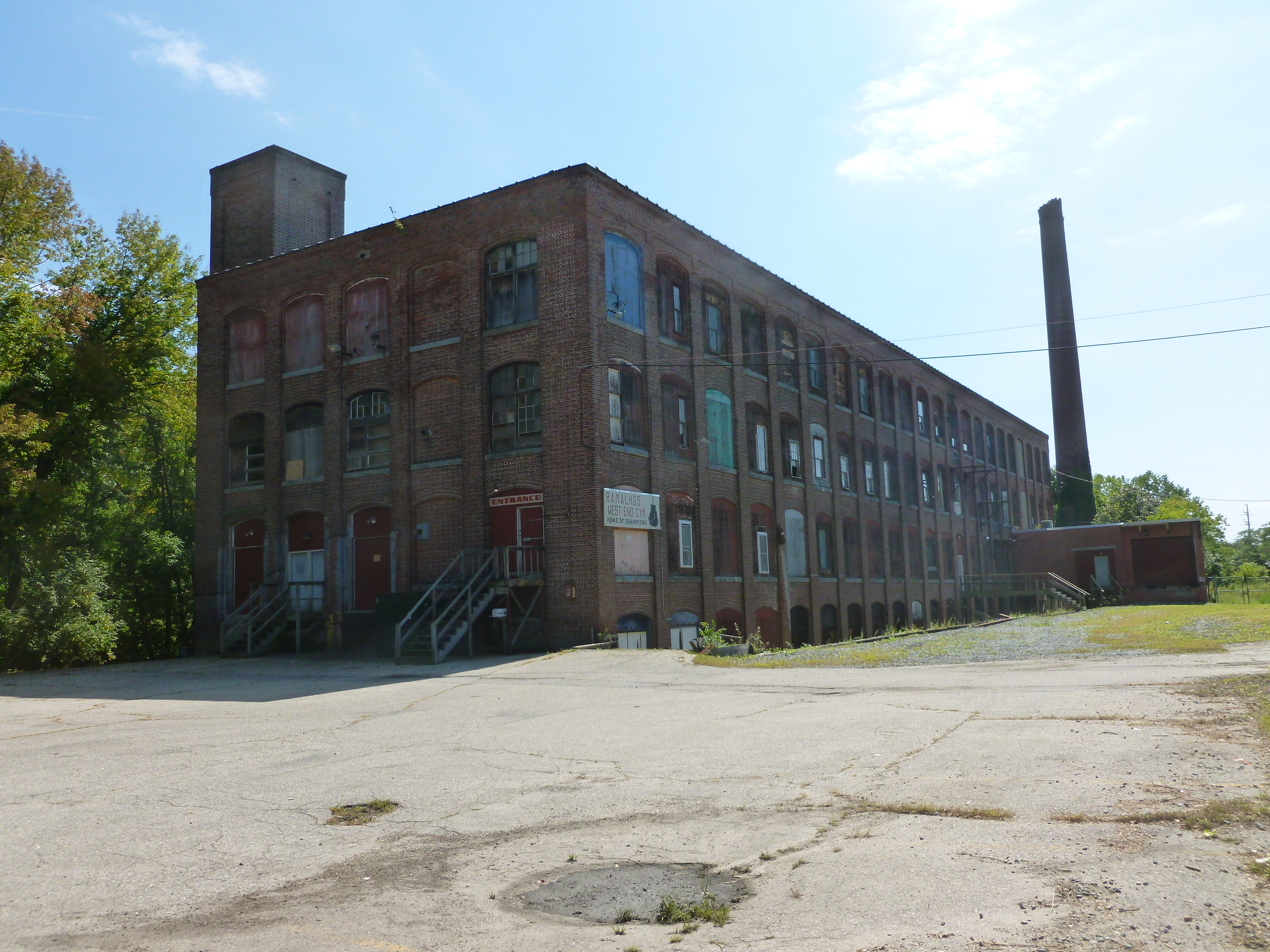
Ramalho's West End Gym trains the city's boxers.

=== Boxing ===
Boxing has formed an important part of Lowell's working-class culture. The city's auditorium hosts the annual New England Golden Gloves tournament, which featured fighters such as Rocky Marciano, Sugar Ray Leonard, and Marvin Hagler. Micky Ward and Dicky Eklund both began their careers in Lowell, the subject of the 2010 film The Fighter. Arthur Ramalho's West End Gym is where many of the city's boxers train.

=== Teams ===
- University of Massachusetts Lowell River Hawks – NCAA Division I Hockey, Soccer, Basketball, Baseball, Softball, Track & Field, Field Hockey, Volleyball
- Boston Fleet – professional ice hockey team. They are one of the six charter franchises of the Professional Women's Hockey League (PWHL)
- Massachusetts Pirates – Professional indoor football team that competes in the Indoor Football League (IFL)
- Lowell Spinners – Former Class A short-season professional baseball affiliate of the Boston Red Sox
- Lowell All-Americans – Former member of the New England Collegiate Baseball League|NECBL (Collegiate Summer Baseball)
- New England Riptide – Former member of the National Pro Fastpitch League (Major League Softball)
- Lowell Nor'easter – Former Semi-Professional football team (New England Football League)
- Greater Lowell United FC – Former semi-Pro soccer team (NPSL)

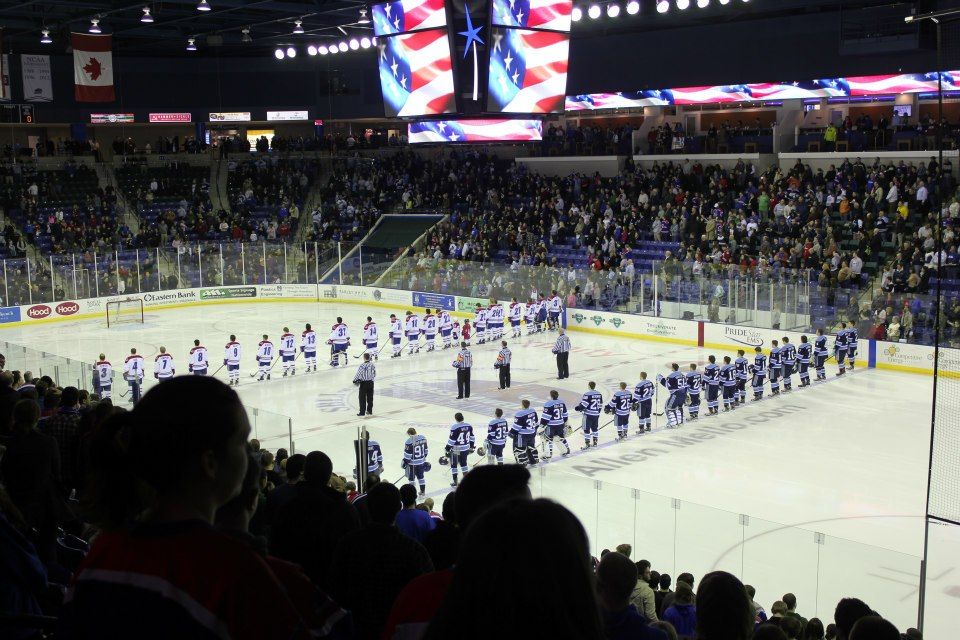
Tsongas Center at UMass Lowell

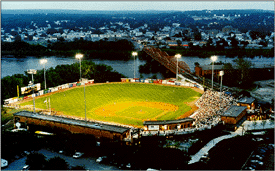
LeLacheur Park, home of the UMass Lowell River Hawks baseball team

== Parks and recreation ==
=== Athletic venues ===
- Edward A. LeLacheur Park Baseball Stadium – owned by the University of Massachusetts Lowell
- Lowell Memorial Auditorium – performance and boxing venue.
- Tsongas Center at UMass Lowell – multi-use sports and concert venue (6500 seats hockey, 7800 concerts) – the University of Massachusetts Lowell River Hawks, and various arena shows. On April 1, 2006, the arena held the 2006 World Curling Championships.
- Cawley Memorial Stadium – Stadium for Lowell High School and other sporting events around the Merrimack Valley. Uses FieldTurf. Former home of the MICCA Marching Band Championship Finals
- Stoklosa Alumni Field – Baseball stadium, used by Lowell All-Americans (4,000 seats)
- Costello Athletic Center indoor arena on campus of the University of Massachusetts Lowell
- UMass Lowell Bellgarde Boathouse used as a rowing and kayaking center for UMass Lowell and the greater Lowell area
- Long Meadow Golf Club – Private 9 hole Golf course in the Belvidere neighborhood
- Mount Pleasant Golf Club – Private 9 hole Golf course in the Highlands neighborhood

== Government ==
Lowell City Council (as of 2/2024)
- Sokhary Chau **
- John Descoteaux
- Erik Gitschier
- Wayne Jenness
- John Leahy **
- Rita M. Mercier **
- Vesna Nuon
- Corey Robinson
- Daniel Rourke *
- Kimberly Scott
- Paul Ratha Yem

* =current mayor

**=former mayor

Lowell has a Plan-E council-manager government. There are eleven city councilors and seven school committee members. The City Council is elected every two years and is composed of eight district seats and three at-large seats. The School Committee is elected for two-year terms and is composed of four district seats, two at-large seats, and the mayor. City Council and School Committee elections are non-partisan. In 1957, Lowell voters repealed a single-transferable-vote system, which had been in place since 1943.

The City Council chooses one of its members as mayor, and another as vice-mayor. The role of the mayor is primarily ceremonial. The mayor runs the weekly meetings under the guidance of the City Clerk. In addition, the mayor serves as the Chairperson of the School Committee.

The administrative head of the city government is the City Manager, who is responsible for all day-to-day operations, functioning within the guidelines of City Council policy, and is hired by and serves indefinitely at the pleasure of at least 5 of 9 City Councilors. As of April 2017, the City Manager is Eileen M. Donghue replacing Kevin J. Murphy.

Lowell is represented in the Massachusetts General Court by elected state representatives Rodney Elliot (D- 16th Middlesex), Vanna Howard (D- 17th Middlesex), Tara Hong (D- 18th Middlesex), and by State Senator Edward J. Kennedy (1st Middlesex) who is also a City Councilor.

Federally, the city is part of Massachusetts's 3rd congressional district and represented by Lori Trahan (D). The state's senior Senator is Elizabeth Warren (D). the state's junior Senator is Ed Markey (D).

In July 2012, Lowell youth led a nationally reported campaign to gain voting privileges for 17-year-olds in local elections; it would have been the first municipality to do so. The 'Vote 17' campaign was supported by national researchers; its goals were to increase voter turnout, create lifelong civic habits, and increase youth input in local matters. The effort was led by youth at the United Teen Equality Center in downtown Lowell.

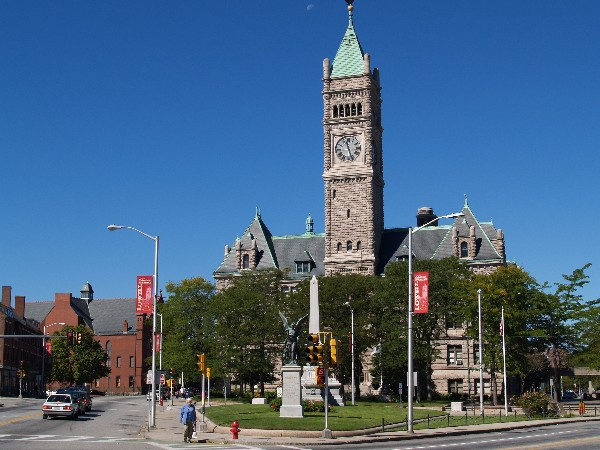
Lowell City Hall

Registered Voters and Party Enrollment as of October 26, 2024
Party	Number of Voters	Percentage
Democratic	21,025	26.90%
Republican	4,974	6.36%
Unenrolled	51,170	65.47%
Other	326	0.42%
Total	78,160	100%

Presidential election results
Year	Democratic	Republican
2024	60.4% 21,080	37.0% 12,906
2020	66.0% 25,544	31.9% 12,346
2016	64.1% 23,555	28.8% 10,584
2012	66.8% 22,771	31.2% 10,643
2008	65.1% 20,646	32.8% 10,393
2004	62.5% 18,195	36.2% 10,554
2000	64.7% 17,554	28.7% 7,790
1996	64.9% 16,912	22.6% 5,896
1992	45.1% 14,492	26.4% 8,467
1988	53.0% 16,391	45.3% 13,998
1984	47.0% 15,042	52.6% 16,834
1980	49.4% 16,353	38.2% 12,668

=== Voting rights lawsuit ===
Lowell is the last city in Massachusetts to use a fully plurality-at-large system due to its impact in diluting minority representation on its city council and school committee. With majority bloc voting these two committees were all-white, and had been mostly so for decades, despite the fact that the city's minority population had grown to 49%.

On May 18, 2017, the Boston Lawyers' Committee for Civil Rights and Economic Justice filed a federal lawsuit on behalf of Latino and Asian-American voters, charging Lowell with violating the Voting Rights Act.

On May 29, 2019, a settlement agreement was reached that laid out six options for Lowell voters to review:

- A single-member district-based system, with nine city council districts including at least two majority-minority districts, and three school committee districts electing two members each, with at least one being a majority-minority district.
- A hybrid system that combines single-member district-based seats with at-large seats:
  - Hybrid 8-1 will have eight single-member districts (at least two majority-minority) and one at-large seat for the city council, and four single-member districts (at least one majority-minority) and two at-large seats for the school committee;
  - Hybrid 8-3 is the same as 8-1 but expanding the city council by two at-large seats;
  - Hybrid 7-2 will have seven single-member districts (at least two majority-minority) and two at-large seats for the city council, and seven single-member districts (at least two majority-minority) for the school committee (increasing its size by one);
- An at-large system of nine city council seats and six school committee seats, elected using single transferable vote—a return to the system in place between 1943 and 1957.
- A three-district system elected using single transferable vote, with three members from each elected to the city council and two members from each elected to the school committee.

Two options will be selected by the city council and will be put before the voters to choose in a non-binding referendum in November 2019, with a final decision by the city council in December 2019. The new system must be put in place by the November 2021 municipal elections.

== Education ==
=== Colleges and universities ===
With a rapidly growing student population, Lowell has been considered an emerging college town. With approximately 12,000 students at Middlesex Community College (MCC) and 19,000 students at University of Massachusetts Lowell, Lowell is currently home to more than 31,000 undergraduate, graduate and doctoral students, and the location of some of the top research laboratories in Massachusetts. UMass Lowell is the third largest state university and fifth largest university in Massachusetts, while MCC is the second largest Community college in Massachusetts.

- Middlesex Community College
- University of Massachusetts Lowell

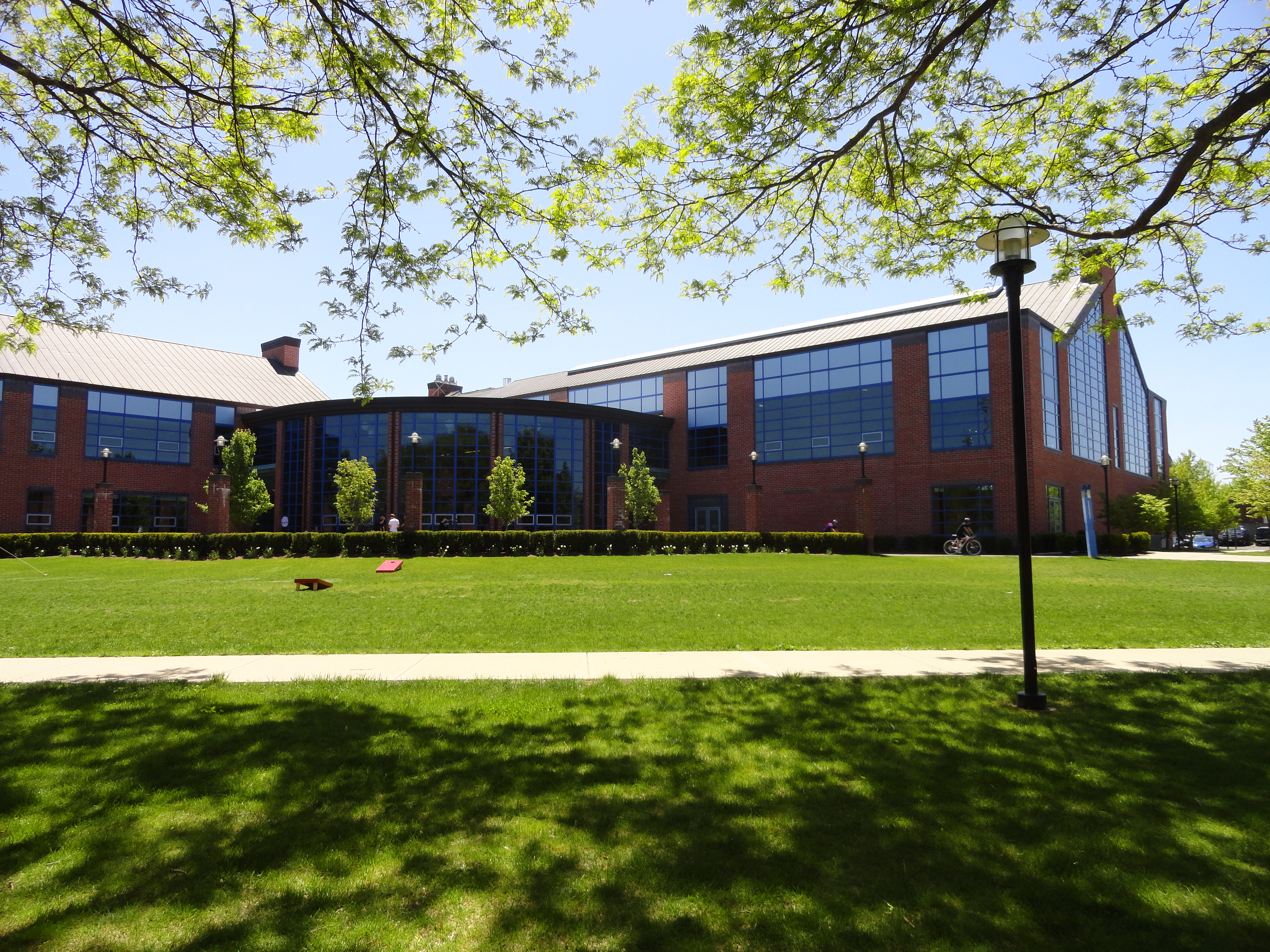
Recreation Center at UMass Lowell

=== Primary and secondary schools ===
==== Public schools ====
Lowell Public Schools operates public schools. Lowell High School is the district public high school. Non-district public schools include Greater Lowell Technical High School, Lowell Middlesex Academy Charter School, Lowell Community Charter Public School, and Collegiate Charter School of Lowell.

Lowell Public Schools is an above average, public school district located in Lowell, MA. It has 14,247 students in grades Pre-K, K–12 with a student-teacher ratio of 14 to 1.

== Media ==
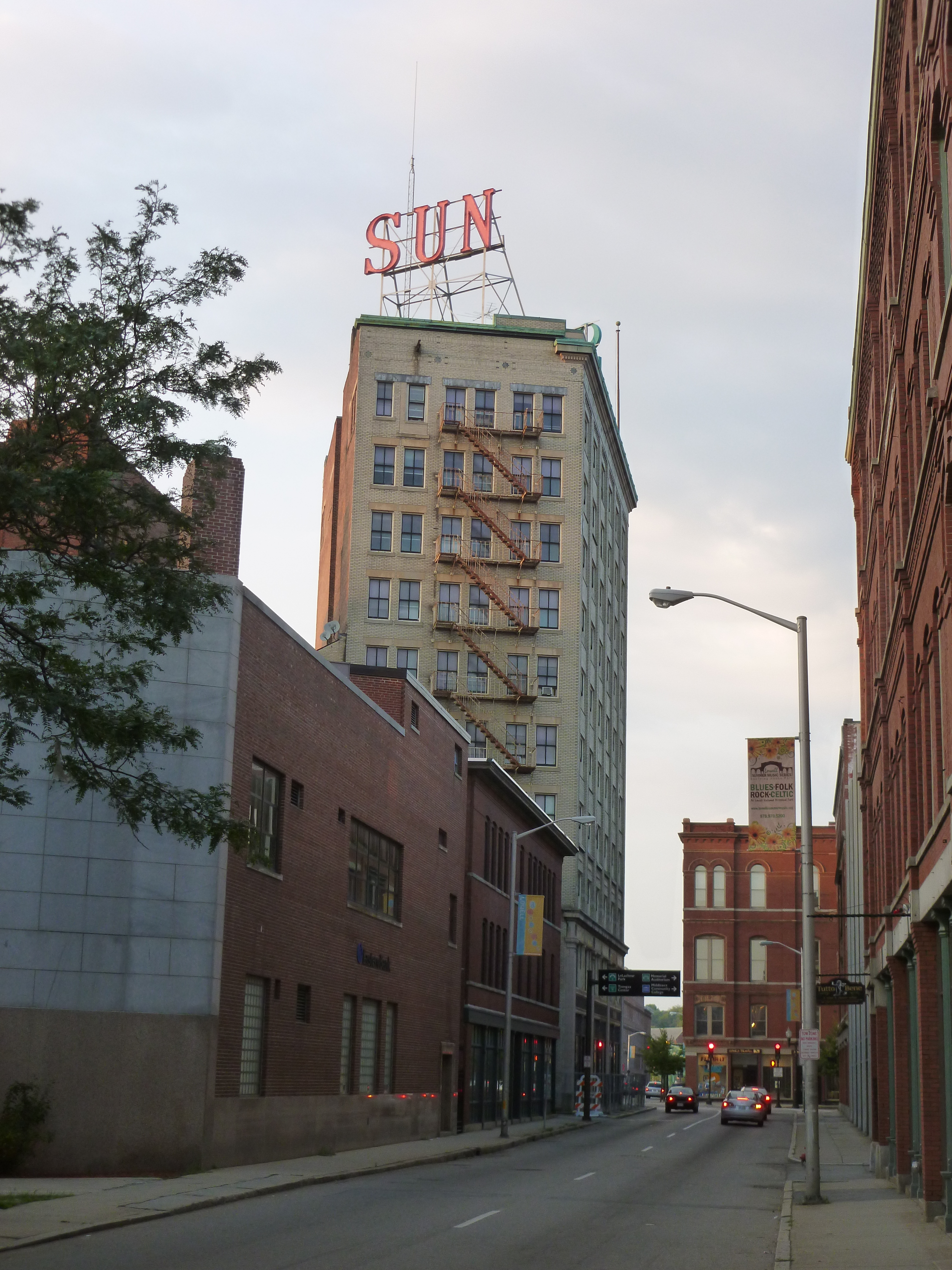
The Sun is the city's daily newspaper.

=== Newspaper ===
The Sun, headquartered in downtown Lowell, is a major daily newspaper serving Greater Lowell and southern New Hampshire. The newspaper had an average daily circulation of about 42,900 copies in 2011. Continuing a trend of concentration of newspaper ownership, The Sun was sold to newspaper conglomerate MediaNews Group in 1997 after 119 years of family ownership.

=== Radio ===
- WCAP AM 980, talk radio
- WLLH AM 1400 Spanish Tropical
- WUML FM 91.5, UMass Lowell-owned station
- WCRB FM 99.5, Classical music, licensed to Lowell

== Infrastructure ==
=== Transportation ===
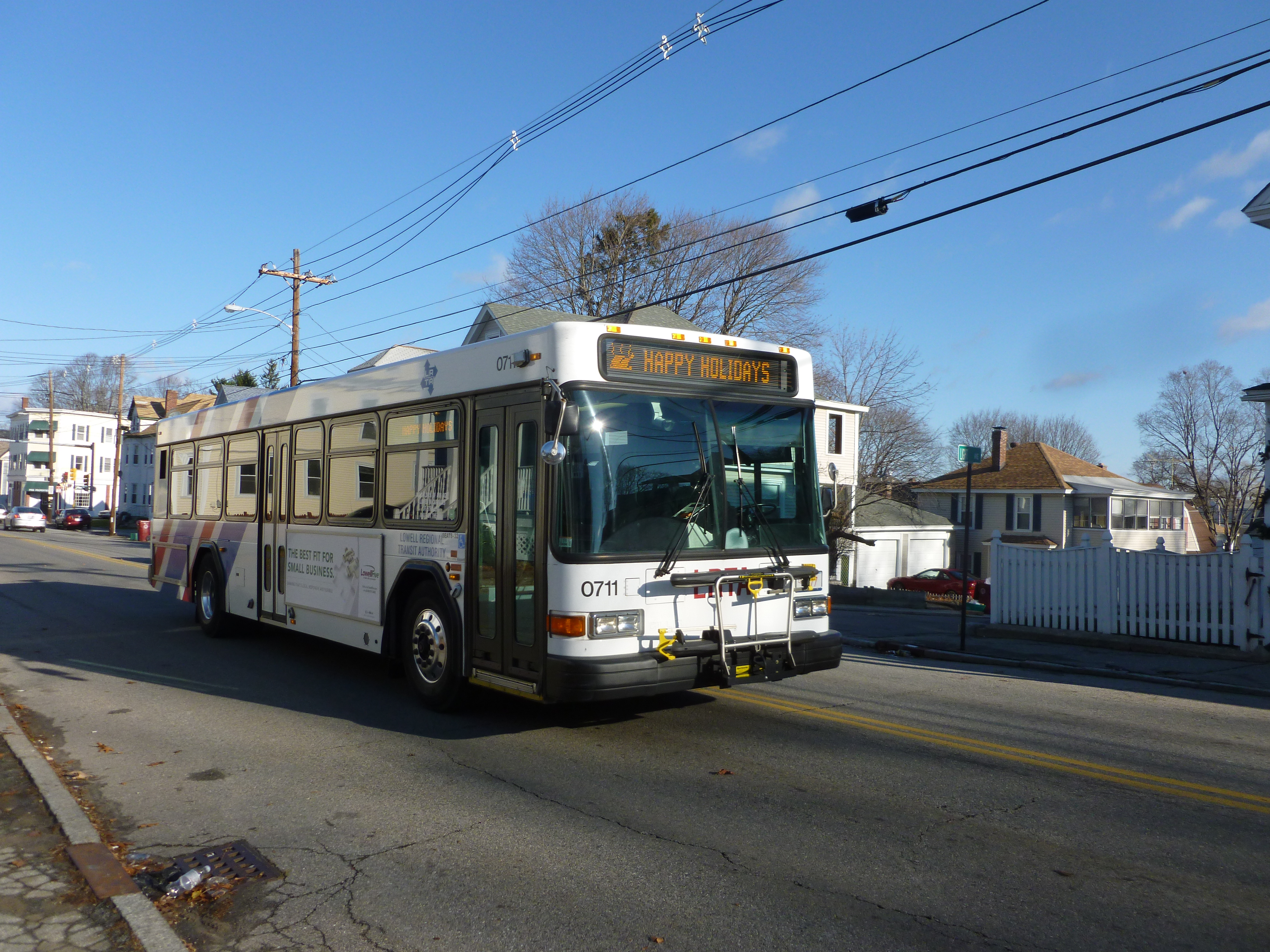
A bus of the Lowell Regional Transit Authority

Lowell can be reached by automobile from Interstate 495, U.S. Route 3, the Lowell Connector, and Massachusetts Routes: 3A, 38, 110, 113, and 133, all of which run through the city; Route 133 begins at the spot where Routes 110 and 38 branch off just south of the Merrimack River. There are six bridges crossing the Merrimack River in Lowell, and four crossing the Concord River (not including the two for I-495).

For public transit, Lowell is served by the Lowell Regional Transit Authority (LRTA), which provides fixed route bus services and paratransit services to the city and surrounding area. OurBus has daily bus service to Worcester and New York City. Other service includes Merrimack Vallery Regional Transfer Authority (MVRTA) Route 24 to Lawrence, and the Coach Company bus to Foxwoods Resort Casino.

Lowell is also served at Lowell station by the MBTA's commuter rail Lowell Line, with several departures daily to and from Boston's North Station.

The Lowell National Historical Park provides a free streetcar between its various sites in the city center, using track formerly used to provide freight access to the city's mills. An expansion to expand the system to 6.9 miles (11.1 km) was planned but rejected in 2016.

In addition to several car rental agencies, Lowell has four Zipcar rental locations convenient to Gallagher Terminal, the Downtown, and the three UMass Lowell campuses (North, South and East).

=== Hospitals ===
- Lowell General Hospital
- Saints Medical Center

=== Law enforcement ===
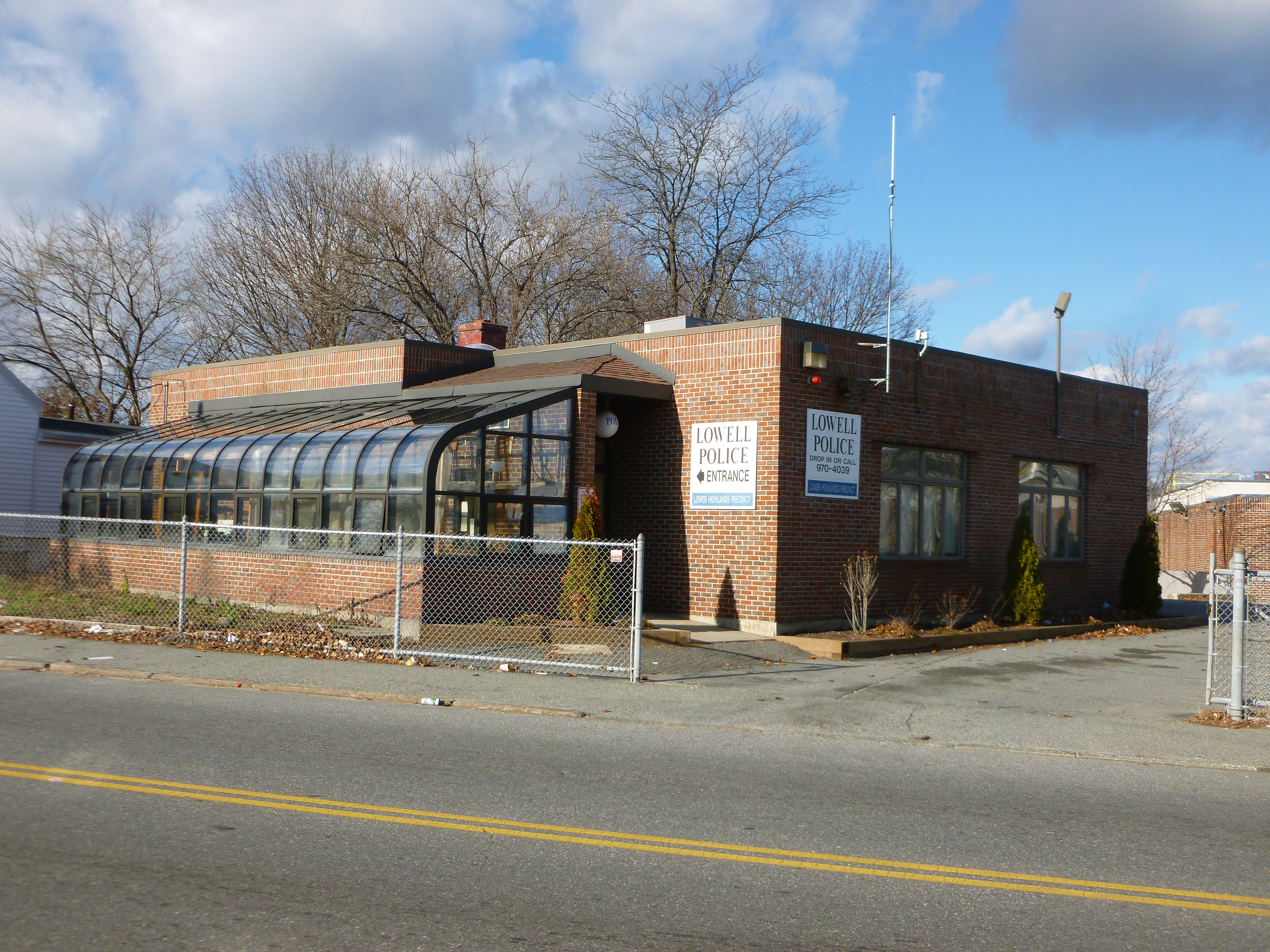
Police station in the city's Highlands neighborhood

The city is primarily policed and protected by the Lowell Police Department, the University Police: UMass Lowell, and the National Park Service Police. The Massachusetts State Police and Middlesex County Sheriff's Office also work with local law enforcement to set up driver checkpoints for alcohol awareness. With the growth of UMass Lowell and the impact of its faculty and students in areas of scientific research, engineering, and nursing, the city has seen rapid gentrification of several neighborhoods.

=== Cable ===
Lowell Telecommunication Corporation (LTC) – A community media and technology center, as well as the first public access television station in Massachusetts to unionize, despite opposition from the nonprofit organization's board of directors.

== Notable people ==
- See List of people from Lowell, Massachusetts

== Businesses started and products invented ==
=== Current ===
The Massachusetts Medical Device Development Center (M2D2) Biotechnology Lab offers 11,000 square feet of fully equipped, shared lab facilities that can house 50 researchers and also includes plenty of co-working and meeting spaces.

The UMASS Lowell Innovation Hub (iHUB) offer entrepreneurs, startups, technology companies and established manufacturing partners 24-hour access to all the amenities they need to get their businesses up and running, such as:

- dedicated office space
- rapid prototype development equipment and services
- open co-working and collaboration space, and
- meeting and conferencing space.

=== Historical ===
- Cash Carriers – William Stickney Lamson of Lowell patented this system in 1881.
- CVS/pharmacy – originally named the Consumer Value Store was founded in Lowell in 1963.
- Father John's Medicine a cough medicine that was first formulated in the United States in a Lowell pharmacy in 1855.
- Francis Turbine – A highly efficient water-powered turbine
- Fred C. Church – Insurance (est. 1865)
- Market Basket – Chain of approximately 80 grocery stores in Massachusetts, New Hampshire, and Maine
- Moxie – the first mass-produced soft drink in the U.S.
- Prince Spaghetti was once a major pasta manufacturer in the United States. The company moved from Boston to Lowell in 1941. Their plant was the largest pasta mill in the country and was located in the "Spaghettiville" section of town. The company was sold to Borden in 1987 and the plant closed in 1997 as production was moved to St. Louis. Their famous slogan was "Wednesday is Prince Spaghetti Day".
- Telephone numbers, 1879, Lowell is the first U.S. city to have phone numbers, two years after Alexander Graham Bell demonstrates his telephone in Lowell.
- Stuarts Department Stores
- Wang Laboratories – Massachusetts Miracle computer company

=== Banks and financial institutions ===
- In 1854, the Lowell Five Cent Savings Bank was founded as the first and only bank in the city that would accept a deposit of less than $1.00. It is the 73rd-oldest bank in America and has been in continuous operation since its founding.
- In 1892, Washington Savings Bank made its first home in Lowell and has continuously served the Greater Lowell area and communities.
- In 1989, Enterprise Bank and Trust was founded in Lowell and is the largest financial institution.
- In 1911, Jeanne D'Arc Credit Union was founded in Lowell and is the 5th-largest credit union in Massachusetts.
- In 1922, Align Credit Union was founded in Lowell.
- In 1936, the Lowell Firefighters Credit Union was founded in Lowell.
- In 1937, the Lowell Municipal Employees FCU was founded in Lowell.
- In 1958, Mills42 Federal Credit Union was founded in Lowell.

==== Merged financial institutions ====
- Lowell Bank and Trust Company (1970–1983; now part of Bank of America)
- Lowell Institution for Savings (1829–1991; now part of TD Banknorth N.A.)
- Butler Bank (1901–2010; now part of People's United Bank)
- Lowell Co-operative Bank/Sage Bank (1885–2018; now part of Salem Five Bank)

== Twin towns – sister cities ==
Lowell's sister cities are:

- Bamenda, Cameroon (2002)
- Barclayville, Liberia
- Berdyansk, Ukraine (1997)
- Kalamata, Greece (2020)
- Nairobi, Kenya
- (Republic of Ireland) Limerick, Ireland (2013)
- Lobito, Angola
- Phnom Penh, Cambodia (2015)
- Saint-Dié-des-Vosges, France (1989)
- Winneba, Ghana (2010)

== See also ==
- List of mill towns in Massachusetts
