= Pawtucketville =

Coordinates: 42°39′30″N 71°19′48″W

- Neighborhood of Lowell
- Interactive map of Pawtucketville
- Country: United States
- State: Massachusetts
- County: Middlesex
- City: Lowell
- ZIP Code: 01854
- Area code: 978

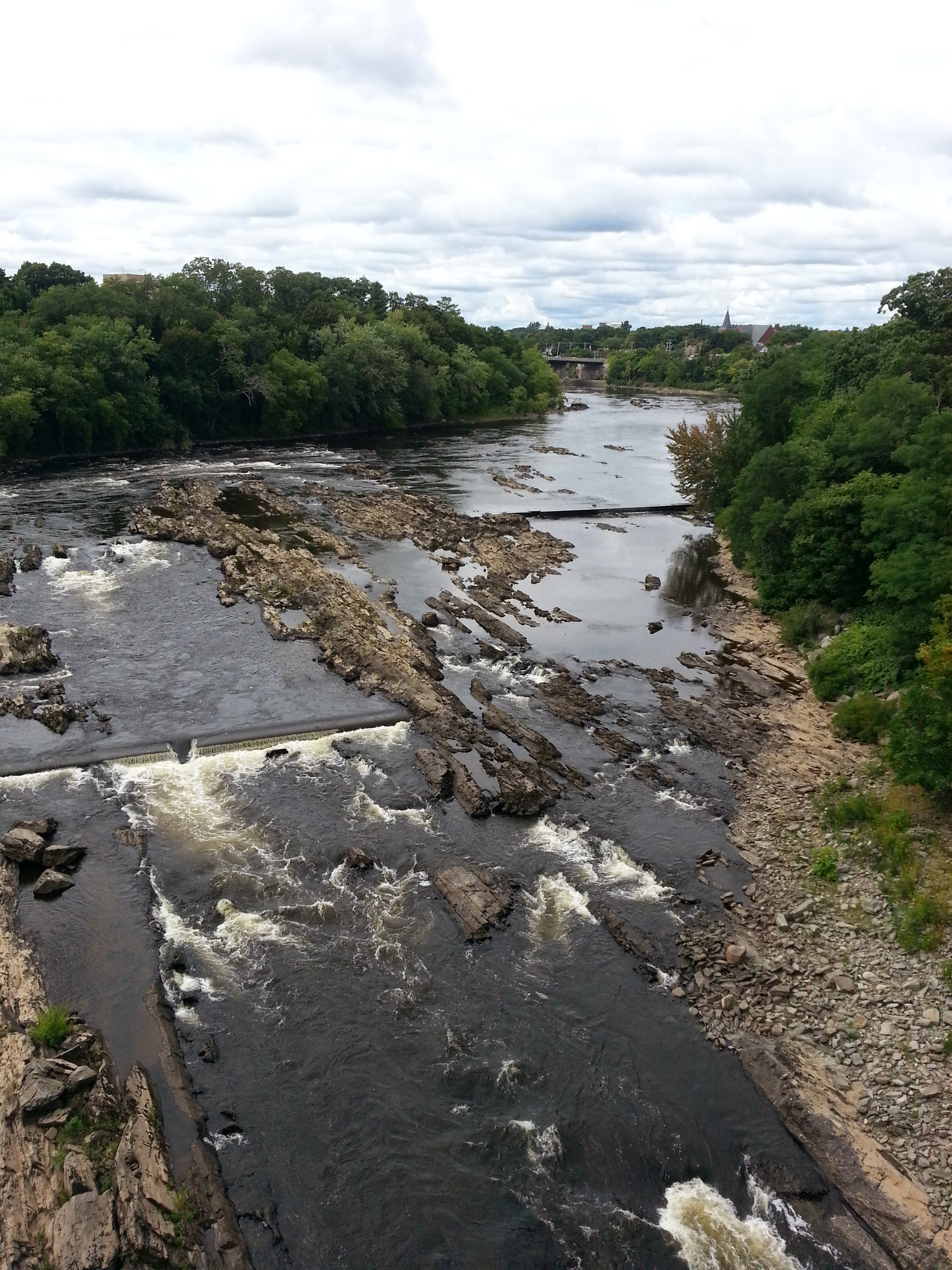
Panoramic view of Merrimack River in Pawtucketville

Pawtucketville is a neighborhood and village within the city of Lowell, Massachusetts.

The area was settled in the 1668 as Drawcott and was previously inhabited by the Pennacook tribe, and eventually "[t]he settlement that developed on the north side of the river was first called Pawtucket Village. The name Pawtucketville can be traced to the construction of the Merrimack-Middlesex Bridge at Pawtucket Falls in 1792, the first bridge that spanned the Merrimack River. On the north side of the bridge, a small village began to develop. This community was originally known as the Village at Pawtucket Falls or Pawtucket Village, and by the time of annexation in 1874, as Pawtucketville." Many notables institutions are located in the village, including Sampas Pavilion, Lowell General Hospital, Pawtucket Congregational Church (Lowell, Massachusetts), and Pawtucketville Memorial Elementary School.

== Notable residents ==
- John Fawcett (entrepreneur)
- Daniel Gage, the "Ice King"
- Jack Kerouac, American novelist and poet; founding member of the "Beat Generation"
- Jonathan Lemire, MSNBC
- Barzillai Lew, African American Revolutionary War veteran
- Harry Lew, early African American basketball player
- Armand Mercier, politician
