= Lowell Heritage State Park =

State park in Massachusetts, United States

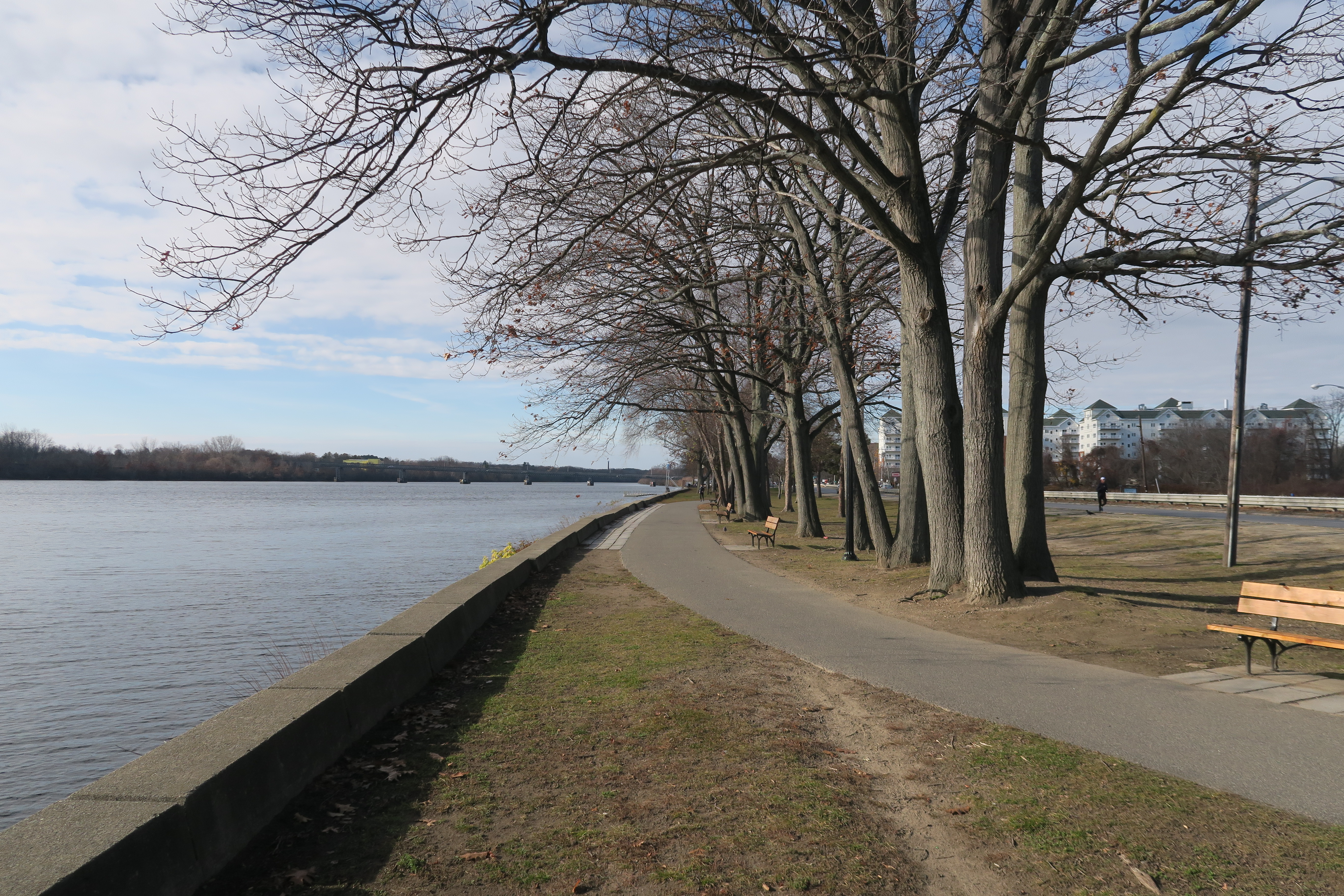
- Vandenberg Esplanade

- Location within Massachusetts Location within the United States
- Location: Lowell, Massachusetts, United States
- Coordinates: 42°38′40″N 71°18′44″W
- Area: 60 acres (24 ha)
- Elevation: 89 ft (27 m)
- Established: 1974
- Administrator: Massachusetts Department of Conservation and Recreation
- Website: Official website

Lowell Heritage State Park is a public recreation area and historical preserve located in Lowell, Massachusetts, that protects and promotes the city's seminal role in the American Industrial Revolution. The state park was established in 1974 as a precursor to Lowell National Historical Park, which was created in 1978. Aside from the functions the national park also serves, the state park maintains additional sites around the city such as the Sampas Pavilion.
