= Servicemen's Readjustment Act of 1944 =

U.S. law providing benefits for World War II veterans

- Long title: AN ACT To provide Federal Government aid for the readjustment in civilian life of returning World War II veterans
- Nicknames: G.I. Bill
- Enacted by: the 78th United States Congress

Citations
- Public law: Pub. L. 78–346
- Statutes at Large: 58 Stat. 284

Legislative history
- Signed into law by President Franklin D. Roosevelt on June 22, 1944

The Servicemen's Readjustment Act of 1944, also known as the G.I. Bill, was a law that provided a range of benefits for some of the returning World War II veterans (commonly referred to as G.I.s). The original G.I. Bill expired in 1956, but the term "G.I. Bill" is used to refer to programs created to assist American military veterans.

It was largely designed and passed through Congress in 1944 in a bipartisan effort led by the American Legion, which wanted to reward practically all wartime veterans. John H. Stelle, a former Democratic governor of Illinois, served as the Chairman of the Legion's Executive Committee, which drafted and mobilized public opinion to get the G.I. Bill to President Roosevelt's desk on June 22, 1944. Stelle was rewarded for his efforts by the Legion which unanimously elected him its National Commander in 1945. He is commonly referred to as the "Father of the G.I. Bill." Since the First World War the Legion had been in the forefront of lobbying Congress for generous benefits for war veterans. President Roosevelt initially proposed a much smaller program. As historians Glenn C. Altschuler and Stuart Blumin point out, FDR did not play a significant role in the contours of the bill. At first, Roosevelt shared with nearly everyone the idea that "satisfactory employment", not educational opportunity, was the key feature of the bill. This changed in the fall of 1944, when Roosevelt's special representative to the European theatre, Anna M. Rosenberg, returned with her report on the G.I.'s postwar expectations. From her hundreds of interviews with servicemen then fighting in France, it was clear they wanted educational opportunities previously unavailable to them. FDR "lit up", Rosenberg recalled, and subsequent additions to the bill included provisions for higher education.

The final bill provided immediate financial rewards for practically all World War II veterans, thereby avoiding the highly disputed postponed life insurance policy payout for World War I veterans that had caused political turmoil in the 1920s and 1930s. Benefits included low-cost mortgages, low-interest loans to start a business or farm, one year of unemployment compensation, and dedicated payments of tuition and living expenses to attend high school, college, or vocational school. These benefits were available to all veterans who had been on active duty during the war years for at least 90 days and had not been dishonorably discharged.

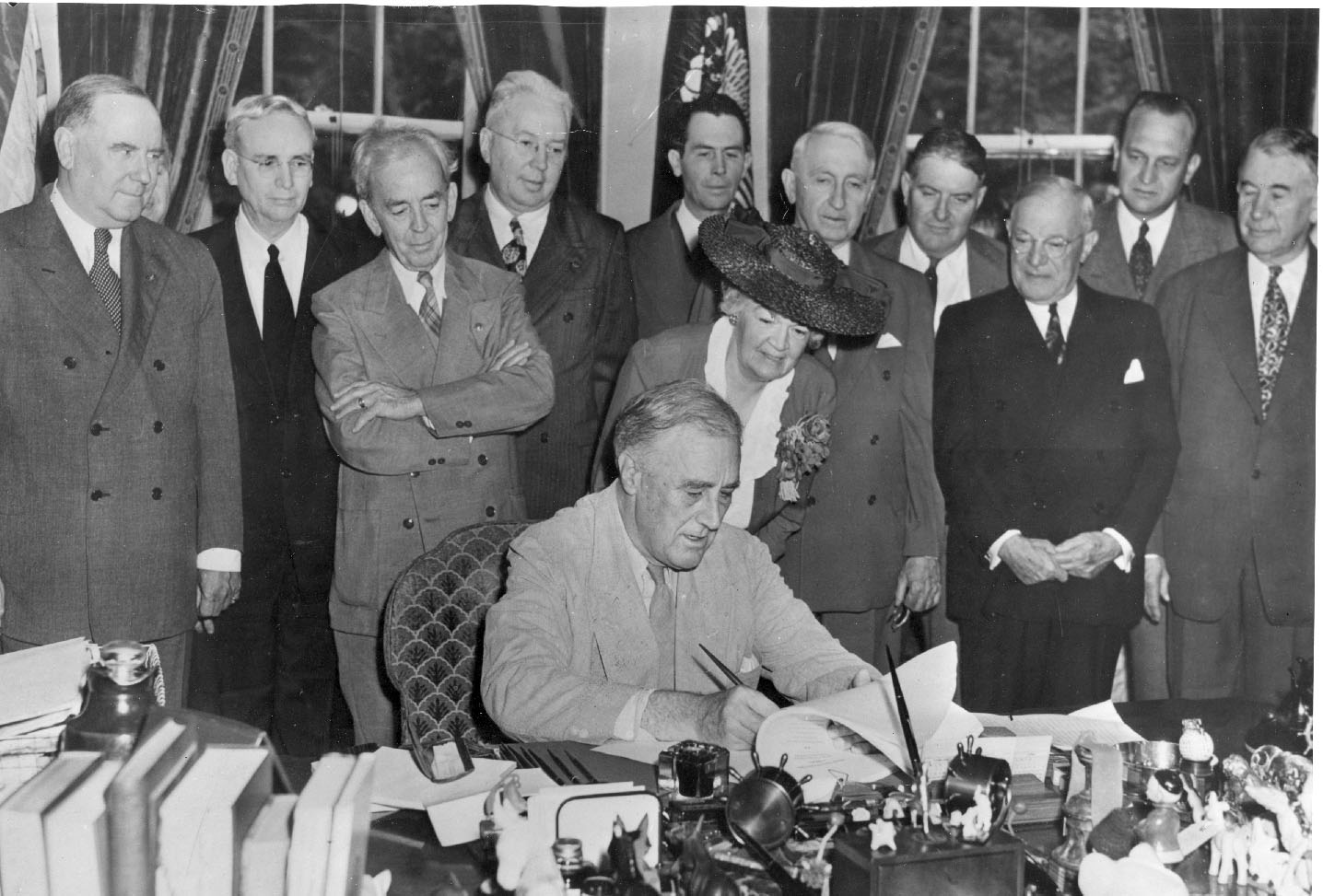
President Roosevelt signs the G.I. Bill into law on June 22, 1944.

By 1956, 7.8 million veterans had used the G.I. Bill education benefits, some 2.2 million to attend colleges or universities and an additional 5.6 million for some kind of training program. Historians and economists judge the G.I. Bill a major political and economic success—especially in contrast to the treatments of World War I veterans—and a major contribution to U.S. stock of human capital that encouraged long-term economic growth. It has been criticized for various reasons including increasing racial wealth disparities during the era of Jim Crow.

The original G.I. Bill ended in 1956. The Post-9/11 Veterans Educational Assistance Act of 2008 provided veterans with funding for the full cost of any public college in their state. The G.I. Bill was also modified through the passage of the Forever GI Bill in 2017.

== History ==
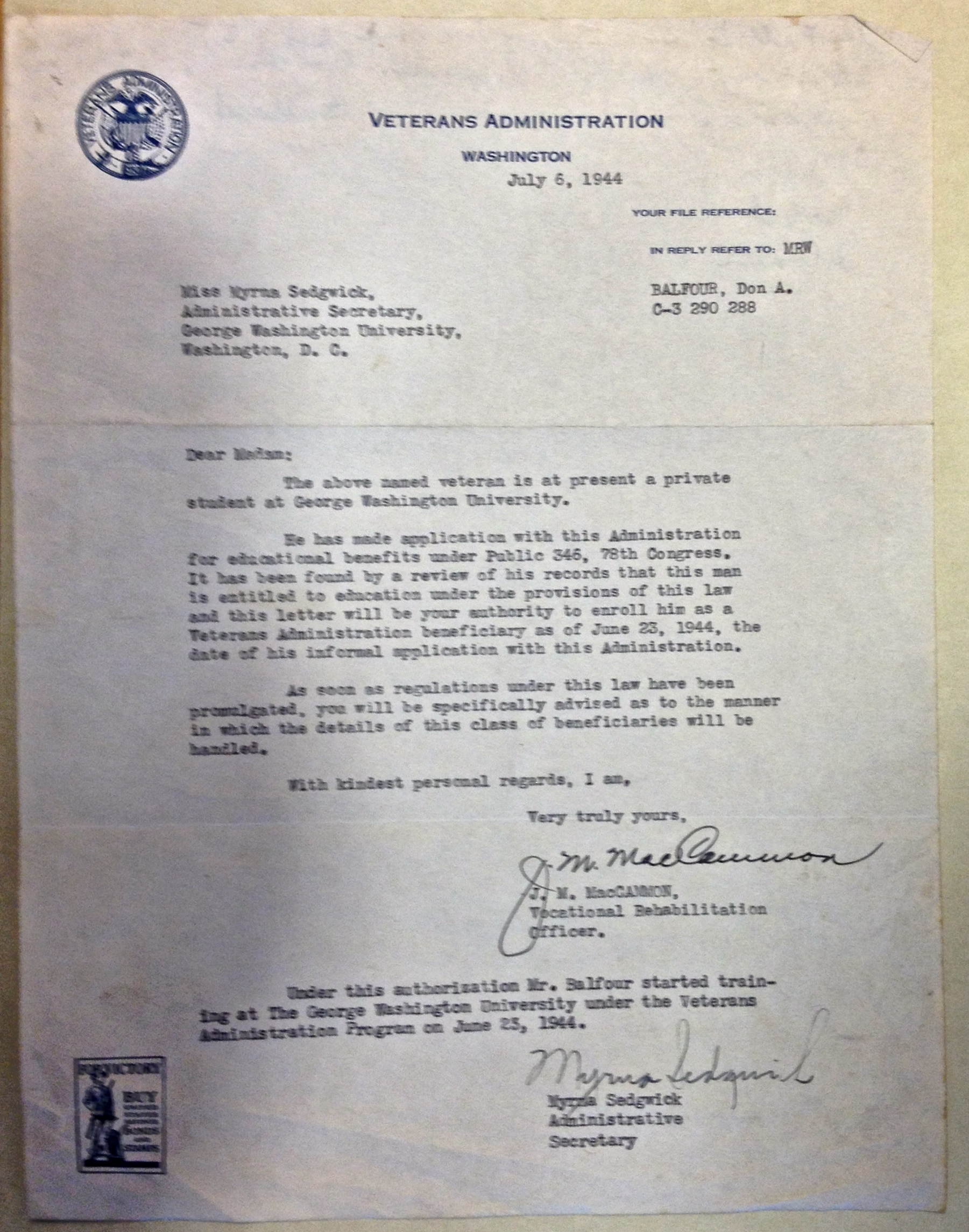
Don A. Balfour was "the first recipient of the 1944 GI Bill." Veterans Administration letter to George Washington University.

On June 22, 1944, the Servicemen's Readjustment Act of 1944, commonly known as the G.I. Bill of Rights, was signed into law. Professor Edwin Amenta states:

Veterans benefits were a bargain for conservatives who feared increasingly high taxation and the extension of New Deal national government agencies. Veterans benefits would go to a small group without long-term implications for others, and programs would be administered by the VA, diverting power from New Deal bureaucracies. Such benefits were likely to hamper New Dealers in their attempts to win a postwar battle over a permanent system of social policy for everyone.

During the war, politicians wanted to avoid the postwar confusion about veterans' benefits that became a political football in the 1920s and 1930s. Veterans' organizations that had formed after the First World War had millions of members; they mobilized support in Congress for a bill that provided benefits only to veterans of military service, including men and women. Ortiz says their efforts "entrenched the VFW and the Legion as the twin pillars of the American veterans' lobby for decades."

Harry W. Colmery, Republican National Committee chairman and a former National Commander of the American Legion, is credited with writing the first draft of the G.I. Bill. He reportedly jotted down his ideas on stationery and a napkin at the Mayflower Hotel in Washington, D.C. A group of 8 from the Salem, Illinois American Legion have also been credited with recording their ideas for veteran benefits on napkins and paper. The group included Omar J. McMackin, Earl W. Merrit, Dr. Leonard W. Esper, George H. Bauer, William R. McCauley, James P. Ringley, A.L. Starshak and Illinois Governor, John Stelle who attended the signing ceremony with President Roosevelt.

U.S. Senator Ernest McFarland, (D) AZ, and National Commander of the American Legion Warren Atherton, (R) CA were actively involved in the bill's passage. Edith Nourse Rogers, (R) MA, who helped write and who co-sponsored the legislation, might be termed as the "mother of the G.I. Bill". As with Colmery, her contribution to writing and passing this legislation has been obscured by time.

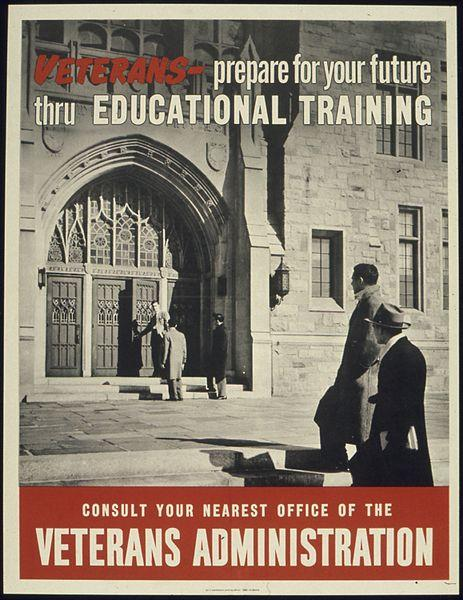
A government poster informing soldiers about the G.I. Bill

The bill that President Roosevelt initially proposed had a means test—only poor veterans would get one year of funding; only top-scorers on a written exam would get four years of paid college. The American Legion proposal provided full benefits for all veterans, including women and minorities, regardless of their wealth.

An important provision of the G.I. Bill was low interest, zero down payment home loans for servicemen, with more favorable terms for new construction compared to existing housing. This encouraged millions of American families to move out of urban apartments and into suburban homes.

Another provision was known as the 52–20 clause for unemployment. Unemployed war veterans would receive $20 once a week for 52 weeks for up to one year while they were looking for work. Less than 20 percent of the money set aside for the 52–20 Club was distributed. Rather, most returning servicemen quickly found jobs or pursued higher education.

The recipients did not pay any income tax on the GI benefits, since they were not considered earned income.

The G.I. Bill received criticism for directing some funds to for-profit educational institutions. The G.I. Bill was racially discriminatory, as it was intended to accommodate Jim Crow laws. Due to the discrimination by local and state governments, as well as by private actors in housing and education, the G.I. Bill failed to benefit African Americans as it did with white Americans. Columbia University historian Ira Katznelson described the G.I. Bill as affirmative action for whites. The G.I. Bill has been criticized for increasing racial wealth disparities.

The original G.I. Bill ended in 1956. A variety of benefits have been available to military veterans since the original bill, and these benefits packages are commonly referred to as updates to the G.I. Bill.

=== After World War II ===
A greater percentage of Vietnam veterans used G.I. Bill education benefits (72 percent) than World War II veterans (49 percent) or Korean War veterans (43 percent).

==== Canada ====
Canada operated a similar program for its World War II veterans, with a similarly beneficial economic impact.

== Problems ==
=== Racial discrimination ===
The G.I. Bill aimed to help American World War II veterans adjust to civilian life by providing them with benefits including low-cost mortgages, low-interest loans and financial support. The chairman of the American Veterans Committee at the time, Charles G. Bolte, wrote that federal agencies were consistently discriminating "as though the legislation were earmarked 'For White Veterans Only'". According to historian Ira Katznelson, "the law was deliberately designed to accommodate Jim Crow". In the New York and northern New Jersey suburbs 67,000 mortgages were insured by the G.I. Bill, but fewer than 100 were taken out by non-whites.

Additionally, some banks and mortgage agencies refused loans to black people. After the war, many people, black people included, returned to their former lives of poverty, making it difficult for them to pursue the higher education opportunities afforded by the G.I. Bill.

In the South, which was still segregated at that time, some universities refused to admit black people until the Civil Rights movement. Colleges accepting black people in the South initially numbered 100. Some of those institutions were of lower quality, with 28 of them classified as sub-baccalaureate. Only seven states offered post-baccalaureate training, while no accredited engineering or doctoral programs were available for blacks. These institutions were all smaller than white or non-segregated universities, often facing a lack of resources.

By 1946, only one fifth of the 100,000 black people who had applied for educational benefits had been registered in college. Furthermore, historically black colleges and universities (HBCUs) came under increased pressure as rising enrollments and strained resources forced them to turn away an estimated 20,000 veterans. HBCUs were already the poorest colleges. HBCU resources were stretched even thinner when veterans' demands necessitated an expansion in the curriculum beyond the traditional "preach and teach" course of study.

Though black people encountered many obstacles in their pursuit of G.I. benefits, the bill greatly expanded the population of African Americans attending college and graduate school. In 1940, enrollment at Black colleges was 1.08% of total U.S. college enrollment. By 1950 it had increased to 3.6%. However, these gains were limited almost exclusively to Northern states, and the educational and economic gap between white and black nationally widened under the effects of the G.I. Bill. With 79 percent of the black population living in southern states, educational gains were limited to a small portion of black Americans.

=== Merchant marine ===
Congress did not include the merchant marine veterans in the original G.I. Bill, even though they were considered military personnel in times of war in accordance with the Merchant Marine Act of 1936. As President Roosevelt signed the G.I. Bill in June 1944 he said, "I trust Congress will soon provide similar opportunities to members of the merchant marine who have risked their lives time and time again during war for the welfare of their country." Now that the youngest World War II veterans are in their 90s, efforts have been made to recognize the merchant mariners' contributions by giving some benefits to the remaining survivors. In 2007, three different bills to address this issue were introduced in Congress, of which one only passed in the House of Representatives. The Belated Thank You to the Merchant Mariners of World War II Act of 2007 establishes Merchant Mariner equality compensation payments by the Secretary of Veterans Affairs of a monthly benefit of $1,000 to each individual who, between December 7, 1941, and December 31, 1946, was a documented member of the U.S. Merchant Marine (including Army Transport Service and the Naval Transport Service). This bill was introduced to the House by Rep. Bob Filner (D-California) in 2007 and passed the House but not the Senate so did not become law. Another attempt to notice Merchant Marines in the G.I. Bill was the 21st Century GI Bill of Rights Act of 2007, introduced by Sen. Hillary Clinton, Entitles basic educational assistance to Armed Forces or reserves who, after September 11, 2001: (1) are deployed overseas; or (2) serve for an aggregate of at least two years or, before such period, are discharged due to a service-connected disability, hardship, or certain medical conditions. Entitles such individuals to 36 months of educational assistance. Rep. Jeff Miller (R-Florida) got the house to pass easier access to the GI Bill by "verifying honorable service as a coast-wise merchant seaman between December 7, 1941, and December 31, 1946, for purposes of eligibility for veterans' benefits under the GI Bill Improvement Act of 1977." It passed the House and went no further.

=== Colleges that target veterans ===
After the GI Bill was instituted in the 1940s, a number of "fly-by-night" vocational schools were created. Some of these for-profit colleges still target veterans, who are excluded from the 90-10 rule for federal funding. This loophole encourages for-profit colleges to target and aggressively recruit veterans and their families. Legislative efforts to close the 90-10 loophole have failed.

Lead generators like QuinStreet have also acted as third parties to recruit veterans for subprime colleges.

=== Inadequate disability coverage ===
The bill specified that any veteran requiring a prosthetic limb would be entitled to one and the training required to utilize it, as well as limited funding for custom automobiles and home renovations. Author Bess Williamson highlighted that there were extensive obstacles to veterans receiving prosthetic limbs following the first and second World Wars. These included inadequate types of prosthetics, poor quality of prosthetics, and a high emphasis on societal reintegration that emphasized aesthetics over function. However, the sympathetic perception of veterans, influenced by films like Meet McGonegal (1944), helped to drive innovation of prosthetic devices. Williamson also argued that these veteran's benefits, despite their flaws, set the stage for later government support and legislation, like the Americans with Disabilities Act.
