= Forever GI Bill =

US education bill

The Harry W. Colmery Veterans Educational Assistance Act of 2017 (Public Law 115-48), commonly known as the "Forever GI Bill", eliminated the 15-year use-it-or-lose-it constraint associated with the Post-9/11 GI Bill education benefit. The updated bill was created with the intent of improving previous versions of the bill and the Reserve Educational Assistance Program (REAP) which is now defunct. The bill, called the Harry W. Colmery Veterans Education Assistance Act of 2017, flew through both the House of Representatives and the Senate in the span of three weeks, passing both by unanimous votes. After the Senate's vote, the bill was signed into law by President Donald Trump.

The official name of the bill is for Harry W. Colmery who is credited with being the author of the original GI Bill (Servicemen's Readjustment Act of 1944).

== Overview ==
The Forever GI Bill includes 34 provisions, 15 of which have the most substantial impact on the greatest number of servicemen, veterans, their dependents, and their beneficiaries. Some of the changes were positive, although some changes reduced coverage and/or eligibility. The most impactful 15 include:

1. Elimination of the 15-year limitation on the use of the Post-9/11 GI Bill benefits.
2. Restoration of lost GI Bill entitlement due to school closures.
3. Expansion of benefits to Purple Heart recipients.
4. Added Yellow Ribbon Program coverage to Fry Scholarship and Purple Heart recipients.
5. Expanded Yellow Ribbon Program coverage for Active Duty members.
6. Changed the entitlement use for licensing and certification tests.
7. Reduced the amount authorized for Basic Allowance for Housing (BAH).
8. Changed how the Basic Allowance for Housing is calculated.
9. Changed Post-9/11 GI Bill eligibility tiering for National Guard and Reservists.
10. Increased GI Bill eligibility for National Guard and Reservists.
11. Changed the transfer of Post-9/11 GI Bill benefits.
12. Reduced the number of months of coverage under the Survivors’ and Dependents Educational Assistance Program (DEA).
13. Increased DEA payment structure.
14. Creation of a STEM scholarship program.
15. Creation of a High Technology pilot program.

There are several lesser known changes that include:

- Permanent work study program approval.
- Mandatory training for school certifying officials.
- VetSuccess program expansion.
- GI Bill usage data.
- VA automation.
- Priority enrollment expansion.

== Summary of Changes ==
Change	Summary of Change
Assistance for students affected by school closures and program disapprovals	If the school closed while the student was attending, the student may seek back entitlements.
Elimination of 15-year time limit to use post-9/11 GI Bill	For service members discharged after January 1, 2013, the 15-year time limit to use benefits was removed. This also applies to children of deceased service members and spouses using Fry Scholarships.
Independent study at technical schools and non-institutions of higher learning	Beneficiaries can now use educational assistance at non institutions of higher education, which are accredited in career and technical education at the postsecondary level.
Priority enrollment	The VA will better share with the beneficiary information regarding institutions which allow priority (early) enrollment to student veterans.
REAP eligibility credited toward post-9/11 GI BIll program	Reserve Educational Assistance Program (REAP) service members can apply their service credit toward the post-9/11 GI Bill.
Work-study expansion	The expiration date for work-study qualification was removed.
GI Bill monthly housing allowance	Service members using the post-9/11 GI Bill after January 1, 2018, will receive a monthly housing allowance.
Changes to licensing and certification charges	The charges under these concepts will be prorated based on the fee charge for the test.
Changes to survivors’ and dependents’ educational assistance	New enrollments under the Survivors’ and Dependents’ Educational Assistance (DEA) after 08/01/2018 will decrease from 45 months to 36 month, however, enrollments before this date will maintain 45 months of benefits. The monthly allowance after 10/01/2018 increase to $1,224 for full-time coursework, $967 three quarter of time and $710 half-time.
Changes to transfer of benefits (TBE)	Dependents’ entitlement can be transferred from a deceased dependent to another. If a veteran dies following the transfer of their entitlement, the dependent who had received their entitlement may transfer the entitlement to another.
Informing schools about beneficiary entitlement	After 08/01/2018 the amount for educational assistance entitled to each beneficiary must be informed by the State to educational institutions. The veterans may opt to not share this information.
Monthly housing allowance during active duty service	The effective day for receiving housing allowance will be the day the beneficiary is discharged from duty, before this bill the effective day corresponded to the first day of the next full month.
Monthly housing based on campus where student attends most classes	Monthly houses allowance consider the zipcode where the beneficiary attends the majority of their classes rather than the school zip code.
Pilot programs for technology courses	The state will give the opportunity to beneficiaries to enroll in high technology education programs based on the skills demanded by employers and industry.
Purple Heart recipients	Recipients of the Purple Heart on or after September 11, 2001, are entitled to Post-9/11 GI Benefits (100% up to 36 months).
Reserve component benefits	National Guard and Reserve members who perform service under 10 U.S.C. 12304a or 12304b are entitled to benefits.
Reserve duty that counts toward post-9/11 eligibility	If a Reservist entered active duty for medical reasons, this is counted towards active duty time necessary for Post-9/11 GI Bill eligibility.
Yellow Ribbon extension to Fry and Purple Heart recipients	Under the Yellow Ribbon Program, universities choose to provide matching funding to cover tuition and fees that exceed those covered under the GI Bill. The Forever GI Bill allows Fry Scholarship and Purple Heart recipients to use this program.
More benefits for STEM programs	Up to nine months of additional benefits are provided for those enrolled in STEM degree fields.
Consolidation of benefit levels	The 40% benefit level has been eliminated and folded into the 60% benefit level.
Yellow Ribbon extension to active duty servicemembers	Under the Yellow Ribbon Program, universities choose to provide matching funding to cover tuition and fees that exceed those covered under the GI Bill. The Forever GI Bill allows active duty service members to use this program.

== Effectiveness of the GI Bill ==
A 2021 study published by the National Bureau of Economic Research (NBER) indicates that the GI Bill has had limited value, and in some cases may be less valuable for veterans than working after leaving military service. According to the authors "All veterans who were already enrolled in college at the time of bill passage increase their months of schooling, but only for those in public institutions did this translate into increases in bachelor’s degree attainment and longer-run earnings. For specific groups of students, large subsidies can modestly help degree completion but harm long run earnings due to lost labor market experience."

== Additional Resources ==
- https://www.militarytimes.com/education-transition/education/2017/08/16/trump-signed-the-forever-gi-bill-here-are-11-things-you-should-know/
- https://www.politico.com/story/2017/08/02/veterans-defense-gi-bill-241266
- https://nvest.studentveterans.org/wp-content/uploads/2017/07/Things-to-Know-About-the-Forever-GI-Bill_SVA-1.pdf
- https://taskandpurpose.com/gi-bill-forever-budget-resources
- https://www.benefits.va.gov/GIBILL/docs/fgib/FGIB_Veteran_Webinar.pdf
