= G.I. Bill =

U.S. law providing benefits for World War II veterans

Servicemen's Readjustment Act of 1944
- Long title: An Act to provide Federal Government aid for the readjustment in civilian life of returning World War II veterans
- Nicknames: G.I. Bill, G.I. Bill of Rights
- Enacted by: the 78th United States Congress

Citations
- Public law: Pub. L. 78–346
- Statutes at Large: 58 Stat. 284

Legislative history
- Introduced in the House as Servicemen's Readjustment Act by Edith Nourse Rogers R‑MA) on January 10, 1944; Passed the Senate on March 17, 1944; Passed the House on May 18, 1944; Agreed to by the Senate on June 12, 1944 and by the House on June 13, 1944; Signed into law by President Franklin D. Roosevelt on June 22, 1944

A G.I. Bill is a colloquial name given to several pieces of legislation that have provided a range of benefits for American military veterans (commonly referred to as G.I.s), particularly education benefits.

The first G.I. Bill, the Servicemen's Readjustment Act of 1944, was largely designed and passed through Congress in 1944 in a bipartisan effort led by the American Legion, which wanted to reward practically all wartime veterans. John H. Stelle, a former Democratic governor of Illinois, served as the Chairman of the Legion's Executive Committee, which drafted and mobilized public opinion to get the G.I. Bill to President Roosevelt's desk on June 22, 1944. He is commonly referred to as the "Father of the G.I. Bill." It provided immediate financial rewards for practically all World War II veterans, thereby avoiding the highly disputed postponed life insurance policy payout for World War I veterans that had caused political turmoil in the 1920s and 1930s. Benefits included low-cost mortgages, low-interest loans to start a business or farm, one year of unemployment compensation, and dedicated payments of tuition and living expenses to attend high school, college, or vocational school. These benefits were available to all veterans who had been on active duty during the war years for at least 90 days and had not been dishonorably discharged.

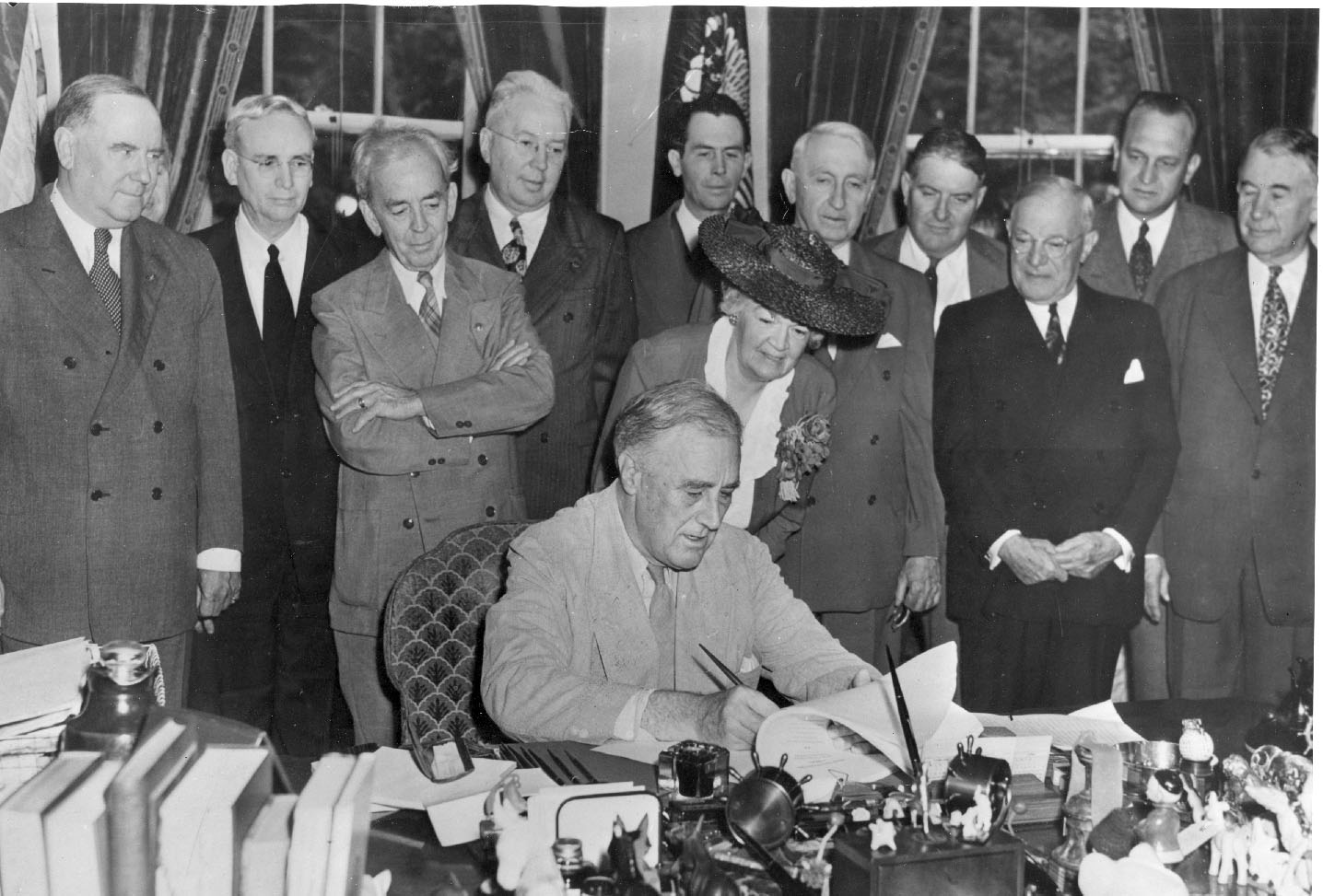
President Roosevelt signs the G.I. Bill into law on June 22, 1944.

The original G.I. Bill ended in 1956, but subsequent bills have provided similar benefits for veterans since. The most recent iteration, the Post-9/11 Veterans Educational Assistance Act of 2008, provides veterans with funding for the full cost of any public college in their state. Other benefits, including medical coverage and home loans, are covered under separate legislation.

== History ==
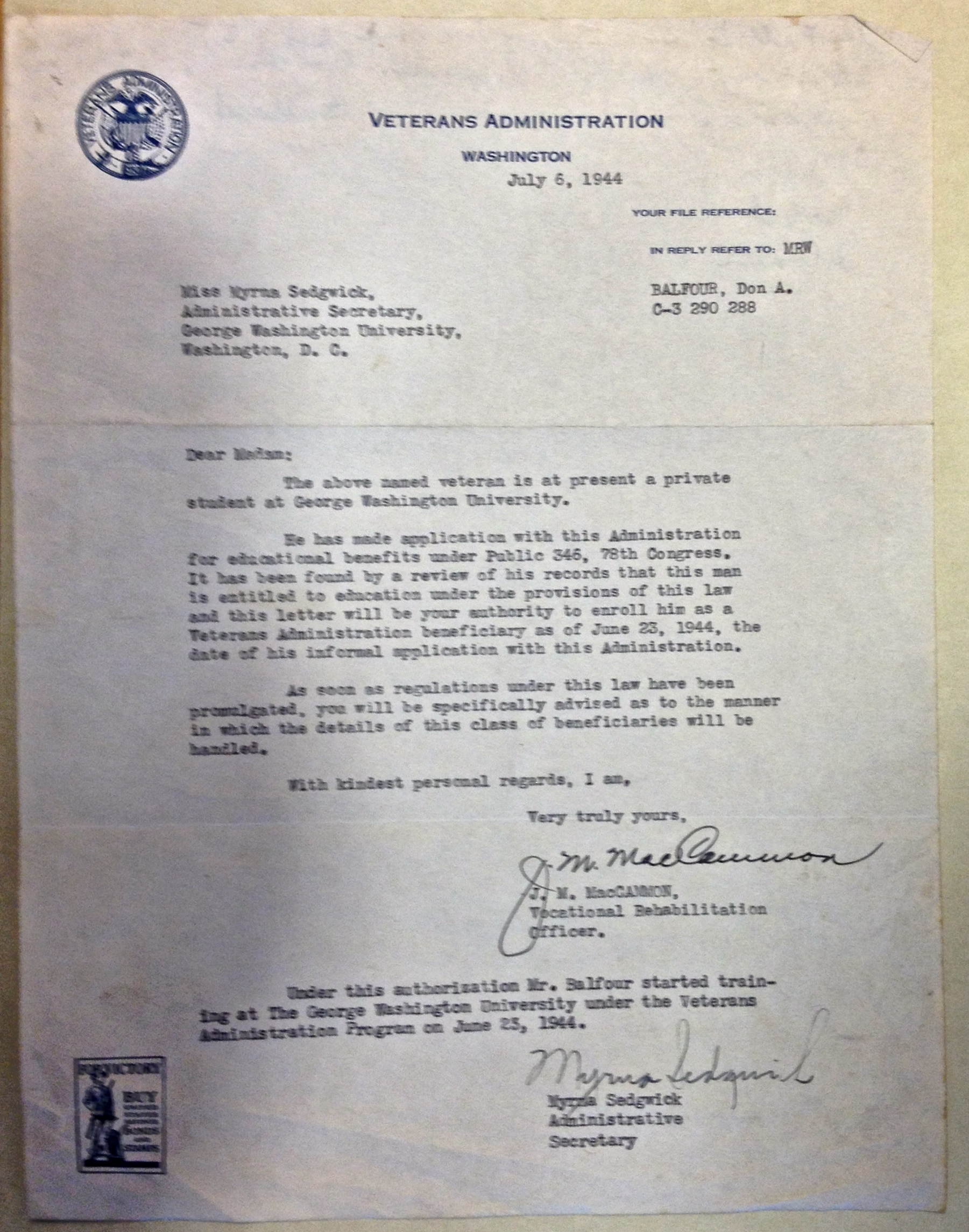
Don A. Balfour was "the first recipient of the 1944 GI Bill." Veterans Administration letter to George Washington University.

=== Servicemember's Readjustment Act of 1944 ===
During World War II, politicians wanted to avoid the postwar confusion about veterans' benefits that became a political football in the 1920s and 1930s. Veterans' organizations that had formed after the First World War had millions of members; they mobilized support in Congress for a bill that provided benefits only to veterans of military service, including men and women. Ortiz says their efforts "entrenched the VFW and the Legion as the twin pillars of the American veterans' lobby for decades."

Harry W. Colmery, Republican National Committee chairman and a former National Commander of the American Legion, is credited with writing the first draft of the G.I. Bill. He reportedly jotted down his ideas on stationery and a napkin at the Mayflower Hotel in Washington, D.C. A group of 8 from the Salem, Illinois American Legion have also been credited with recording their ideas for veteran benefits on napkins and paper. The group included Omar J. McMackin, Earl W. Merrit, Dr. Leonard W. Esper, George H. Bauer, William R. McCauley, James P. Ringley, A.L. Starshak and Illinois Governor, John Stelle who attended the signing ceremony with President Roosevelt.

U.S. Senator Ernest McFarland, (D) AZ, and National Commander of the American Legion Warren Atherton, (R) CA were actively involved in the bill's passage. Edith Nourse Rogers, (R) MA, who helped write and who co-sponsored the legislation, might be termed as the "mother of the G.I. Bill". As with Colmery, her contribution to writing and passing this legislation has been obscured by time.

The bill that President Roosevelt initially proposed had a means test—only poor veterans would get one year of funding; only top-scorers on a written exam would get four years of paid college. The American Legion proposal provided full benefits for all veterans, including women and minorities, regardless of their wealth.

On June 22, 1944, the Servicemen's Readjustment Act of 1944, commonly known as the G.I. Bill of Rights, was signed into law. Professor Edwin Amenta states:

Veterans benefits were a bargain for conservatives who feared increasingly high taxation and the extension of New Deal national government agencies. Veterans benefits would go to a small group without long-term implications for others, and programs would be administered by the VA, diverting power from New Deal bureaucracies. Such benefits were likely to hamper New Dealers in their attempts to win a postwar battle over a permanent system of social policy for everyone.

An important provision of the G.I. Bill was low interest, zero down payment home loans for servicemen, with more favorable terms for new construction compared to existing housing. This encouraged millions of American families to move out of urban apartments and into suburban homes.

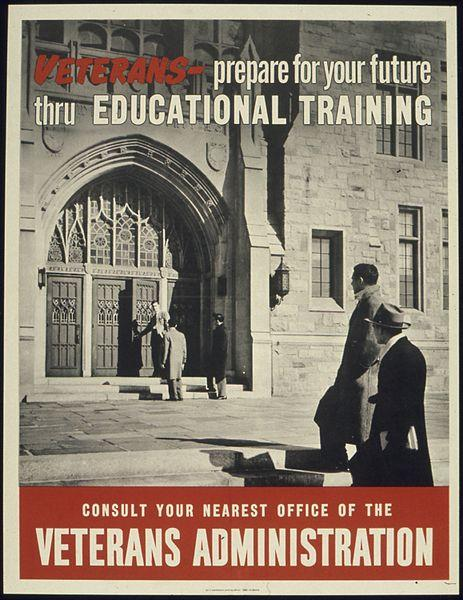
A government poster informing soldiers about the G.I. Bill

Another provision was known as the 52–20 clause for unemployment. Unemployed war veterans would receive $20 once a week for 52 weeks for up to one year while they were looking for work. Less than 20 percent of the money set aside for the 52–20 Club was distributed. Rather, most returning servicemen quickly found jobs or pursued higher education.

The recipients did not pay any income tax on the GI benefits, since they were not considered earned income.

The G.I. Bill received criticism for directing some funds to for-profit educational institutions. The G.I. Bill was racially discriminatory, as it was intended to accommodate Jim Crow laws. Due to the discrimination by local and state governments, as well as by private actors in housing and education, the G.I. Bill failed to benefit African Americans as it did with white Americans. Columbia University historian Ira Katznelson described the G.I. Bill as affirmative action for whites. The G.I. Bill has been criticized for increasing racial wealth disparities.

Most of the provisions in the World WarII-era G.I. Bill ended in 1956. A variety of benefits have been available to military veterans since the original bill, though the term "G.I. Bill" typically is used to refer specifically to education benefits.

=== Outside the United States ===
Canada operated a similar program for its World War II veterans, with a similarly beneficial economic impact.

=== Veterans Readjustment Assistance Act of 1952 ===
At the start of the Korean War, advocates pushed to extend the 1944 Servicemen's Readjustment Act to cover Korean war veterans. After two years of debate, an entirely new piece of legislation was passed by Harry Truman in 1952. The first GI Bill had spawned the creation of numerous low-quality vocational programs that specifically targeted veterans; the Korean War-era bill attempted to curtail this by only allowing benefits to be paid to institutions with at least 15% non-veteran enrollment.

The Korean War-era legislation maintained the World War II-era bill's provisions for low-interest home loans and some unemployment insurance, though the amount of unemployment insurance was significantly reduced from the first bill.

=== Veterans Readjustment Benefits Act of 1966 ===
The so-called "Cold War G.I. Bill" was authored by Ralph Yarborough, passed unanimously by both chambers of Congress, and signed into law by Lyndon B. Johnson in 1966.

=== Post-Vietnam Era Veterans' Educational Assistance (1976) ===
This iteration of the G.I. bill intended not only to compensate veterans for their service, but to reduce the need for another draft by attracting volunteers to the military. Often referred to as VEAP, the program required that veterans forfeit a portion of each paycheck into a fund, and the government matched each dollar paid into the fund with two dollars. Like previous iterations of the program, VEAP funds could be used for academic or vocational programs.

A greater percentage of Vietnam veterans used G.I. Bill education benefits (72 percent) than World War II veterans (49 percent) or Korean War veterans (43 percent).

=== Montgomery GI Bill (1984) ===
In 1984, former Mississippi Democratic Congressman Gillespie V. "Sonny" Montgomery sponsored a new G.I. Bill, which remains in effect today alongside other, newer programs. Active duty members pay $100 per month into the program for 12 months to receive 36 months of tuition after leaving the military. Benefits can be used for degree and certificate programs, flight training, apprenticeship/on-the-job training, and correspondence courses if the veteran was enrolled full-time. Part-time veteran students, reservists and members of the national guard receive reduced benefits. These benefits still exist, alongside the Post-9/11 G.I. Bill.

=== Post-9/11 GI Bill (2008) ===
Congress passed the current iteration of the program into law in recognition of the fact that "service on active duty in the Armed Forces [had] been especially arduous for the members of the Armed Forces since September 11, 2001" and with the goal of reducing high levels of unemployment among veterans.

This iteration of the program, signed into law in 2008 and put into effect in 2009, dramatically expanded education benefits. The bill provides partial benefits (under 36 months) to those who served less three years, and allows veterans to transfer their benefits to spouses or dependents. The program covers 100% of in-state tuition, or up to a certain amount for private college or vocational programs. Beneficiaries are also eligible for a monthly housing stipend on top of their tuition costs.

The Post-9/11 G.I. Bill is the most popular option for most veterans, though many are also entitled to benefits from other programs, including the Montgomery G.I. Bill. Congress estimates the program awards about $10 billion to around 600,000 individuals each year.

=== Litigation surrounding use of multiple benefits ===
In 2024, the United States Supreme Court ruled in Rudisill v. McDonough that veterans who accrue educational benefits under both the Montgomery and Post-9/11 G.I. Bills, by serving at least 1,185 days, may use either or both, and may use them in any order. A subsequent case, Perkins v. Collins, affirmed that this applied not only to veterans who served during two distinct enlistments, but to any veteran who served the requisite amount of time.

== Content ==
All veteran education programs are found in law in Title 38 of the United States Code. Each specific program is found in its own Chapter in Title 38.

=== Chapter 30 (Montgomery GI Bill) ===
In 1984, former Mississippi Democratic Congressman Gillespie V. "Sonny" Montgomery revamped the G.I. Bill. From 1984 until 2008, this version of the law was called "The Montgomery G.I. Bill". The Montgomery GI Bill — Active Duty (MGIB) stated that active duty members had to forfeit $100 per month for 12 months; if they used the benefits, they received as of 2012 $1564 monthly as a full-time student (tiered at lower rates for less-than-full-time) for a maximum of 36 months of education benefits. This benefit could be used for both degree and certificate programs, flight training, apprenticeship/on-the-job training, and correspondence courses if the veteran was enrolled full-time. Part-time veteran students received less, but for a proportionately longer period. This meant that for every month the veteran received benefits at the half-time, the veteran's benefits were only charged for 1/2 of a month. Veterans from the reserve had different eligibility requirements and different rules on receiving benefits (see Ch. 1606, Ch. 1607 and Ch. 33). MGIB could also be used while active, which only reimbursed the cost of tuition and fees. Each service has additional educational benefit programs for active duty members. Most delay using MGIB benefits until after separation, discharge or retirement.

==== "Buy-Up" option ====
The "Buy-Up" option, allows active duty members to forfeit up to $600 more toward their MGIB. For every dollar the service member contributes, the federal government contributes $8. Those who forfeit the maximum ($600) will receive, upon approval, an additional $150 per month for 36 months, or a total of $5400. This allows the veteran to receive $4,800 in additional funds ($5400 total minus the $600 contribution to receive it), but not until after leaving active duty (unless the tuition of a term is higher than the monthly MGIB rate would pay). The additional contribution must be made while still on active duty. It is available for G.I. Bill recipients using either Ch. 30 or Ch. 1607, but cannot be extended beyond 36 months if a combination of G.I. Bill programs are used. It will pay past 36 months of eligibility, by being paid to the end of the term where entitlement is exhausted.

The "buy-up" option is not to be confused with a "kicker". A kicker is an additional payment as well, however it is a contractual incentive for specific jobs, and not an optional offering soldiers can pay into.

==== Time limit/eligibility ====
MGIB benefits may be used up to 10 years from the date of last discharge or release from active duty. The 10-year period can be extended by the amount of time a service member was prevented from training during that period because of a disability or because he/she was held by a foreign government or power.

The 10-year period can also be extended if one reenters active duty for 90 days or more after becoming eligible. The extension ends 10 years from the date of separation from the later period. Periods of active duty of fewer than 90 days qualify for extensions only if one was separated for one of the following:

- A service-connected disability
- A medical condition existing before active duty
- Hardship

For those eligible based on two years of active duty and four years in the Selected Reserve (also known as "call to service"), they have 10 years from their release from active duty, or 10 years from the completion of the four-year Selected Reserve obligation to use MGIB benefits.

At this time, service members cannot recoup any monies paid into the MGIB program should it not be utilized.

==== Top-up option ====
Service members may use GI bill in conjunction with Military Tuition Assistance (MilTA) to help with payments above the MilTA CAP. This will reduce the total benefit available once the member leaves service. Veterans Educational Assistance Improvements Act of 2010 (Public Law 111–377, January 4, 2011), Section 111, amended Title 38, U.S. Code, by adding section 3322(h), "Bar to Duplication of Eligibility Based on a Single Event or Period of Service," which does not allow the Department of Veterans Affairs (VA) to establish eligibility for a Service Member under more than one education benefit. If a service member applies for Montgomery GI Bill benefits (such as the Top-up option to augment Tuition Assistance) and entered service on/after August 1, 2011, then they must incur a subsequent period of service to convert to the Post 9/11 GI Bill. If the service member cannot incur another period of service, they are not eligible to convert. The VA considers a service member has elected a GI Bill upon submission of VA Form 22–1990.and VA approval and issues a Certificate of Eligibility.

==== Educational ====
- College, business
- Technical or vocational courses
- Correspondence courses
- Apprenticeship/job training
- Flight training (usually limited to 60% for Ch. 30, see Ch. 33 for more flight information)

Under this bill, benefits may be used to pursue an undergraduate or graduate degree at a college or university, a cooperative training program, or an accredited independent study program leading to a degree.

=== Chapter 31 (Vocational Rehabilitation Program) ===
"Chapter 31" is a vocational rehabilitation program that serves eligible active duty servicemembers and veterans with service-connected disabilities. This program promotes the development of suitable, gainful employment by providing vocational and personal adjustment counseling, training assistance, a monthly subsistence allowance during active training, and employment assistance after training. Independent living services may also be provided to advance vocational potential for eventual job seekers, or to enhance the independence of eligible participants who are presently unable to work.

In order to receive an evaluation for Chapter 31 vocational rehabilitation and/or independent living services, those qualifying as a "servicemember" must have a memorandum service-connected disability rating of 20% or greater and apply for vocational rehabilitation services. Those qualifying as "veterans" must have received, or eventually receive, an honorable or other-than-dishonorable discharge, have a VA service-connected disability rating of 10% or more, and apply for services. Law provides for a 12-year basic period of eligibility in which services may be used, which begins on latter of separation from active military duty or the date the veteran was first notified of a service-connected disability rating. In general, participants have 48 months of program entitlement to complete an individual vocational rehabilitation plan. Participants deemed to have a "serious employment handicap" will generally be granted exemption from the 12-year eligibility period and may receive additional months of entitlement as necessary to complete approved plans.

=== Chapter 32 (Veterans Educational Assistance Program) ===
The Veterans Educational Assistance Program (VEAP) is available for those who first entered active duty between January 1, 1977, and June 30, 1985, and elected to make contributions from their military pay to participate in this education benefit program. Participants' contributions are matched on a $2 for $1 basis by the Government with a maximum allowable participant contribution of $2,700. (Maximum possible government contribution: $5,400. Maximum possible benefit: $8,100.) This benefit may be used for degree and certificate programs, flight training, apprenticeship/on-the-job training and correspondence courses.

=== Chapter 33 (Post-9/11) ===
Congress, in the summer of 2008, approved an expansion of benefits beyond the current G.I. Bill program for military veterans serving since the September 11 attacks originally proposed by Democratic Senator Jim Webb. Beginning in August 2009, recipients became eligible for greatly expanded benefits, or the full cost of any public college in their state. The new bill also provides a housing allowance and $1,000 a year stipend for books, among other benefits.

The VA announced in September 2008 that it would manage the new benefit itself instead of hiring an outside contractor after protests by veteran's organizations and the American Federation of Government Employees. Veterans Affairs Secretary James B. Peake stated that although it was "unfortunate that we will not have the technical expertise from the private sector," the VA "can and will deliver the benefits program on time."

In December 2010 Congress passed the Post-9/11 Veterans Education Assistance Improvements Act of 2010. The law, often referred to as G.I. Bill 2.0, expands eligibility for members of the National Guard to include time served on Title 32 or in the full-time Active Guard and Reserve (AGR). It does not, however, cover members of the Coast Guard Reserve who have served under Title 14 orders performing duties comparable to those performed by National Guard personnel under Title 32 orders.

The 2010 law also includes enrollment periods. In this case if the veteran is full-time, and the maximum BAH rate is $1500 per month, then the veteran will receive (13/30)x$1500 = $650 for the end of the first period of enrollment, then the veteran will receive (10/30)x$1500 = $500 for the beginning of the second period of enrollment. Effectively, the change in break-pay means the veteran will receive $1150 per month for August instead of $1500 per month. This has a significant impact in December - January BAH payments since most Colleges have 2-4 week breaks.

Another change enables active-duty servicemembers and their G.I. Bill-eligible spouses to receive the annual $1,000 book stipend (pro-rated for their rate of pursuit), adds several vocational, certification and OJT options, and removes the state-by-state tuition caps for veterans enrolled at publicly funded colleges and universities.

Changes to Ch. 33 also includes a new $17,500 annual cap on tuition and fees coverage for veterans attending private colleges and foreign colleges and universities.

=== Chapter 34 (Vietnam Era G.I. Bill) ===
The Vietnam Era G.I. Bill provided educational assistance for service members serving on Active Duty for more than 180 days with any portion of that time falling between January 31, 1955, and January 1, 1977. To be eligible, service members must have been discharged under conditions other than dishonorable. There was no service member contribution for this program like Chapter 30 or 32. This program was sunset on December 31, 1989.

=== Chapter 35 (Survivors' and Dependents' Educational Assistance Program) ===
The Survivors' and Dependents' Educational Assistance (DEA) Program delivers education and training advantages to dependents from eligible resources to veterans who have either have a terminal illness due to a service-related condition, or who were called to active duty or had a disability related to serving in the American forces in the United States. That program gives around 50 months of education benefits. However, there are still more opportunities. The benefits may be used for degree and certificate programs, apprenticeship, and on the job training. Spouses of veterans and former spouses are offered free courses occasionally.

=== Chapter 1606 (Montgomery GI Bill- Selective Reserve) ===
The Montgomery G.I. Bill — Selected Reserve (MGIB-SR) program may be available to members of the Selected Reserve, including all military branch reserve components as well as the Army National Guard and Air National Guard. This benefit may be used for degree and certificate programs, flight training, apprenticeship/on-the-job training and correspondence courses.

=== Chapter 1607 (Reserve Educational Assistance Program) ===
The Reserve Educational Assistance Program (REAP) was available to all reservists who, after September 11, 2001, complete 90 days or more of active duty service "in support of contingency operations." This benefit provided reservists return from active duty with up to 80% of the active duty (Chapter 30) G.I. Bill benefits as long as they remained active participants in the reserves. Chapter 1607 was sunset on November 25, 2019, to make way for the Post 9/11 G.I. Bill.

== MGIB comparison chart ==
Type	Active Duty MGIB Chapter 30	Active Duty Chap 30 Top-up	Post-9/11 G.I. Bill Chapter 33	Voc Rehab Chapter 31	VEAP Chapter 32	DEA Chapter 35	Selected Reserve Chapter 1606	Selected Reserve (REAP) Chapter 1607	Additional Benefits Tuition Assistance	Additional Benefits Student Loan Repayment Program
Info link										
Time limit (eligibility)	10 yrs from last discharge from active duty.	While on active duty only.	If service ended before January 1, 2013; benefits expire 15 yrs after last discharge from active duty. If discharged on or after January 1, 2013; benefits do not expire.	12 yrs from discharge or notification of service-connected disability, whichever is later. In cases of "extreme disability", the 12-year timeline can be waived.	Entered service for the first time between January 1, 1977, and June 30, 1985; Opened a contribution account before April 1, 1987; Voluntarily contributed from $25 to $2700		While in the Selected Reserve	While in the Selected Reserve. If separated from Ready Reserve for disability which was not result of willful misconduct, for 10 yrs after date of entitlement.	On the day one leaves the Selected Reserve; this includes voluntary entry into the IRR.	On the day one leaves the Selected Reserve; this includes voluntary entry into the IRR.
Months of benefits (full time)	36 months	36 months	36 months	48 months	1 to 36 months depending on the number of monthly contributions	up to 45 months	36 months	36 months	Contingent as long as one serves as a drilling Reservist.	Contingent as long as one serves as a drilling Reservist.

== Other legal safeguards ==
The State of California has an 85-15 rule that aims to prevent predatory for-profit colleges and "fly-by-night schools" from targeting veterans.

In 2012, President Barack Obama issued Executive Order 13607 to ensure that military service members, veterans, and their families would not be aggressively targeted by sub-prime colleges.

== GI Bill comparison tool and college choice ==
The Department of Veterans Affairs maintains a website for veterans to compare colleges that use the GI Bill, in order to use their educational benefits wisely.

The VA also has a GI Bill feedback system for veterans to lodge their complaints about schools they are attending.
