= Warren Atherton =

American Lawyer and National Commander of the American Legion

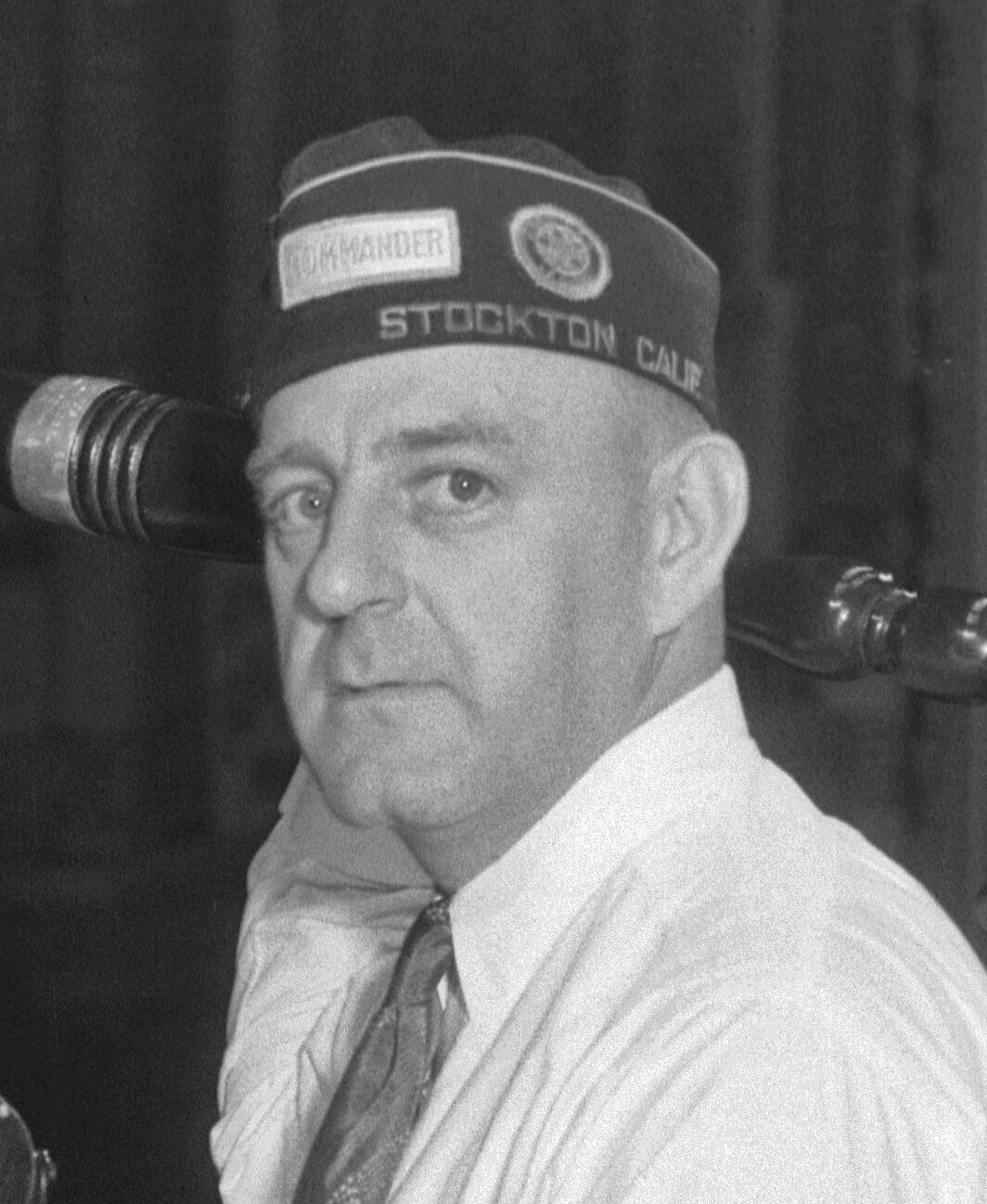
- Born: Warren Hendry Atherton; December 28, 1891; San Francisco, California, US
- Died: March 7, 1976 (aged 84); Stockton, California, US
- Occupation: Attorney
- Known for: Designer of the G.I. Bill
- Title: National Commander of The American Legion
- Term: 1943 – 1944
- Predecessor: Roane Waring
- Successor: Edward N. Scheiberling
- Spouse: Anne Holt Atherton (m. 1917–1951)
- Military career
- Allegiance: United States
- Branch: United States Army
- Rank: Captain
- Conflicts: World War I

Warren Hendry Atherton (December 28, 1891 – March 7, 1976) was an American attorney who was the national commander of The American Legion from 1943 to 1944. He is widely recognized as a designer of the G.I. Bill, officially known as the Servicemen's Readjustment Act of 1944.

== Early life ==
Born in San Francisco, California, the son of Dwight Copeland Atherton and Elizabeth Hendry, he is a direct descendant of James Atherton, one of the first settlers of New England, who arrived in Dorchester, Massachusetts, in the 1630s.

Atherton received no formal higher education. Nonetheless, at age 20, he went to work for the Stockton law office of H. R. McNoble in 1911.

== Career ==
After serving under General John J. Pershing in France during World War I, he was admitted to the California State Bar in 1913, and began his career as an attorney, eventually gaining notoriety as a Stockton City judge and local president of the Chamber of Commerce.

He also worked as the general counsel for the California Department of Veterans Affairs and its preceding boards and commissions from 1935 to 1960, and served on the California Board of Prison Terms and Paroles (1935–1937). He served as California State Commander in the 1930s.

During 1943, Atherton was a consultant to the Secretary of War and envoy to Nelson Rockefeller, coordinator of international affairs. He was vocal against strikes during wartime, clashing with the U.S. labor leader, William Green. He had promoted this stance since 1941 when he was part of the American Legion defence committee.

He served as National Commander of The American Legion from 1943 to 1944. In 1943, he joined Francis Sullivan in drafting the G.I. Bill, suggesting one bill be written that would consolidate the best features of many veteran bills then before Congress. Atherton had to overcome opposition by Representative John E. Rankin, a Mississippi Democrat and segregationist, who at first co-sponsored the bill, but then opposed it. The Bill passed through Congress in 1944 in a bipartisan effort led by Atherton as Head of his the American Legion, who wanted to reward practically all wartime veterans.

Atherton was a supporter of Universal service which he believed was needed to shorten World War II. At the 1944 American Legion National Convention in Chicago, Atherton presented the Legion's Distinguished Service Medal to Henry Ford II in honor of his grandfather Henry Ford's achievements. During this period he toured Australia, the Pacific and Latin America.

== Later life ==
Atherton was a staunch California Republican, and served as delegate to the Republican National Convention in 1944, 1948 and 1952. Controversially, he supported the idea of deportation of Japanese nationals at the end of World War II.

As chairman of the Republican Veterans League, the Republican National Committee announced in 1948 his appointment as chairman of the advisory committee of the Republican Veterans for Dewey and Warren. The New York Times reported on July 24, 1953, his appointment to the reconstituted National Security Training Commission.

Atherton ran to represent California in the United States Senate in 1958. He withdrew from the Republican primary and endorsed Goodwin Knight, who subsequently lost to Democrat Clair Engle.

== Personal ==
Upon his return from World War I, he married Anne Holt, daughter of the founder of Caterpillar Inc. and inventor, Benjamin Holt. He lived with his family on Atherton Island and was a Rotary member. A fete attended by over 300 people was marked in his honor to commemorate his 80th birthday in 1971.

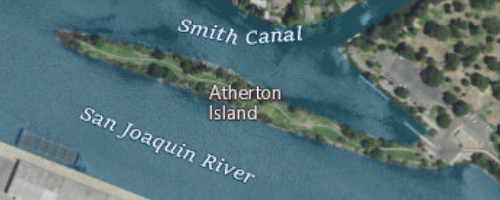
Geological Survey imagery of Atherton Island, located in the Sacramento–San Joaquin River Delta

Atherton died on March 7, 1976, and his service was at the University of the Pacific Morris Chapel. His papers are preserved and made available for research in the University's Holt-Atherton Special Collections and Archives.

He was listed in Who's Who in Commerce and Industry and Who’s Who in America”.

== Legacy ==
The San Joaquin Delta College campus has the Warren Atherton Auditorium, a 1,428-seat performance venue where concerts are hosted. Notable annual musicals are held at this venue, as well as regular performances by the Stockton Symphony.

Non-profit organization positions
| Preceded by Roane Waring | National Commander of The American Legion; 1943 – 1944 | Succeeded by Edward N. Scheiberling |
