= Reserve Educational Assistance Program =

The Reserve Educational Assistance Program (REAP) was an education program for American students that was established as a part of the Ronald W. Reagan National Defense Authorization Act for Fiscal Year 2005.

REAP was a Department of Defense education benefit program designed to provide educational assistance to members of the Reserve components called or ordered to active duty in response to a war or national emergency (contingency operation) as declared by the US President or the US Congress. This program made certain reservists who were activated for at least 90 days after September 11, 2001, were either eligible for education benefits or eligible for increased benefits.

Chapter 1607 was sunset on November 25, 2019.

== Info ==
- Pamphlet
- Factsheet

== See also ==
G.I. Bill
