= Atherton Island =

Island in California

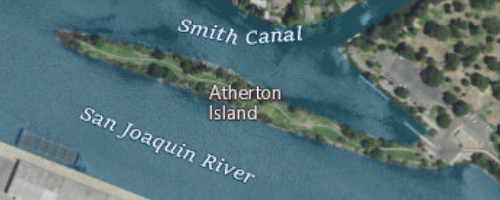
- USGS aerial imagery of Atherton Island, only a small part of which appears at the top, across the Smith Canal from the mislabeled Louis Park Peninsula, with Rough and Ready Island across the San Joaquin River to the south.

- Location within Sacramento-San Joaquin River Delta Location within California Location within the United States

Geography
- Location: Northern California
- Coordinates: 37°57′22″N 121°21′01″W
- Adjacent to: Sacramento–San Joaquin River Delta
- Highest elevation: 13 ft (4 m)

Administration
- United States
- State: California
- County: San Joaquin

Atherton Island is a small island in the Sacramento–San Joaquin River Delta. It is in unincorporated San Joaquin County, California, part of Stockton. Its coordinates are 37°57′22″N 121°21′01″W, and the United States Geological Survey measured its elevation as 13 ft (4.0 m) in 1999. It appears on a 2015 USGS map of the area.
