= John Jacob Rogers =

American politician (1881–1925)

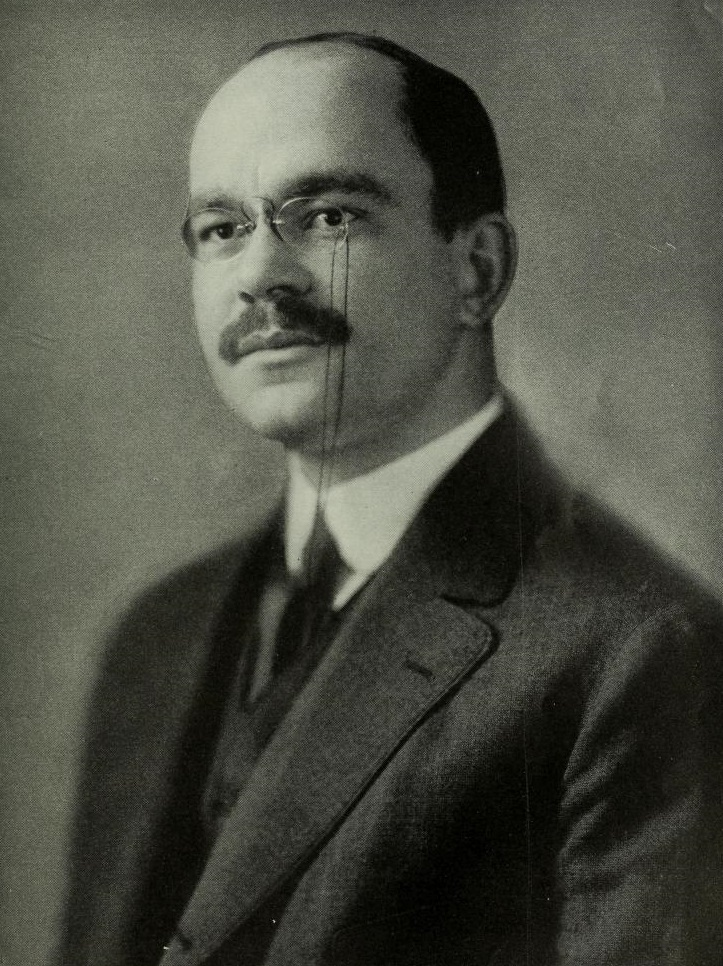

Member of the U.S. House of Representatives from Massachusetts's 5th district
- In office March 4, 1913 – March 28, 1925
- Preceded by: Butler Ames
- Succeeded by: Edith Nourse Rogers

Personal details
- Born: August 18, 1881 Lowell, Massachusetts, U.S.
- Died: March 28, 1925 (aged 43) Washington, D.C., U.S.
- Party: Republican
- Spouse: Edith Nourse (m. 1907)
- Profession: Attorney

Military service
- Branch/service: United States Army
- Years of service: September 12, 1918 – November 29, 1918
- Rank: Private
- Commands: Twenty-ninth Training Battery, Tenth Training Battalion, Field Artillery, Fourth Central Officers’ Training School
- Battles/wars: World War I

John Jacob Rogers (August 18, 1881 – March 28, 1925) was an American lawyer and politician who served seven terms as a member of the United States House of Representatives from Massachusetts from 1913 until his death in office in 1925.

His wife, Edith Nourse Rogers, succeeded him in Congress and served for 35 years.

== Early life and education ==
Rogers was born in Lowell, Massachusetts, and graduated from Harvard University in 1904 and from Harvard Law School in 1907. He practiced law in Lowell, starting in 1908.

== Career ==
Rogers was a member of the Lowell city government in 1911 and school commissioner in 1912.

=== Congress ===
He was elected as a Republican to the Sixty-third and to the six succeeding Congresses and served from March 4, 1913, until his death.

==== World War I ====
During the First World War, Rogers enlisted on September 12, 1918, as a private with the Twenty-ninth Training Battery, Tenth Training Battalion, Field Artillery, Fourth Central Officers’ Training School, and served until honorably discharged on November 29, 1918.

==== Foreign Service Act ====
Rogers is remembered as "The father of the Foreign Service" due to his sponsorship of the 1924 Foreign Service Act, also known as the Rogers Act.

== Death ==
Rogers died in Washington, D.C., of Hodgkins' disease on March 28, 1925. While a later biography would say that he died of appendicitis his obituary noted that "Rep. Rogers was operated on for appendicitis last July 14." He was interred at Lowell Cemetery in Lowell, Massachusetts.

== Family ==
His wife, Edith Nourse Rogers, who would end up being the longest serving female of Congress for over 60 years, succeeded him in Congress.

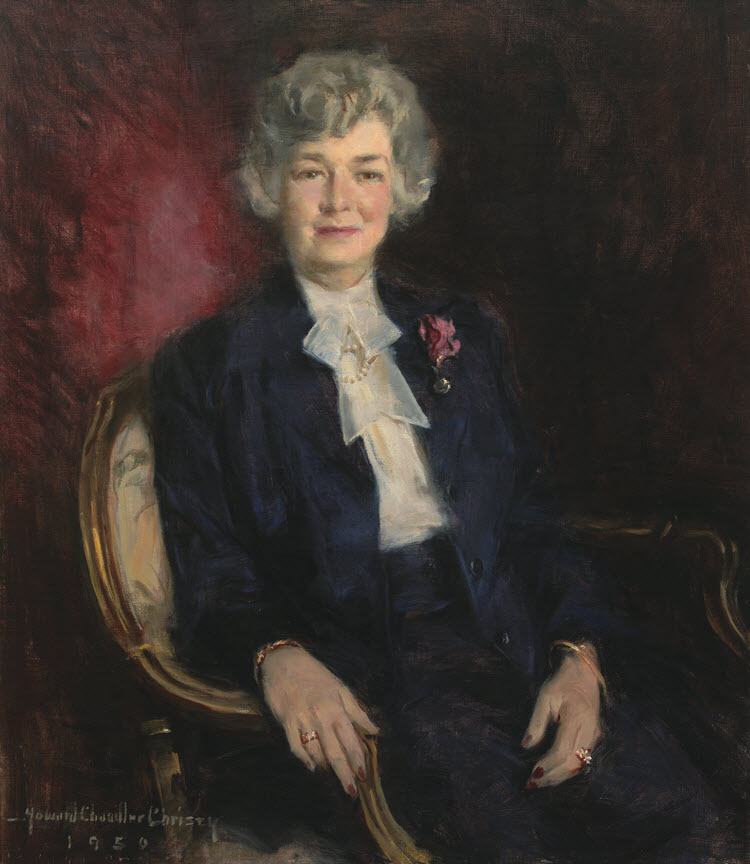
Edith Nourse Rogers

== See also ==
- List of members of the United States Congress who died in office (1900–1949)

U.S. House of Representatives
Preceded by Butler Ames	Member of the U.S. House of Representatives from Massachusetts's 5th congressional district 1913–1925	Succeeded by Edith Nourse Rogers
