= Rogers Hall School =

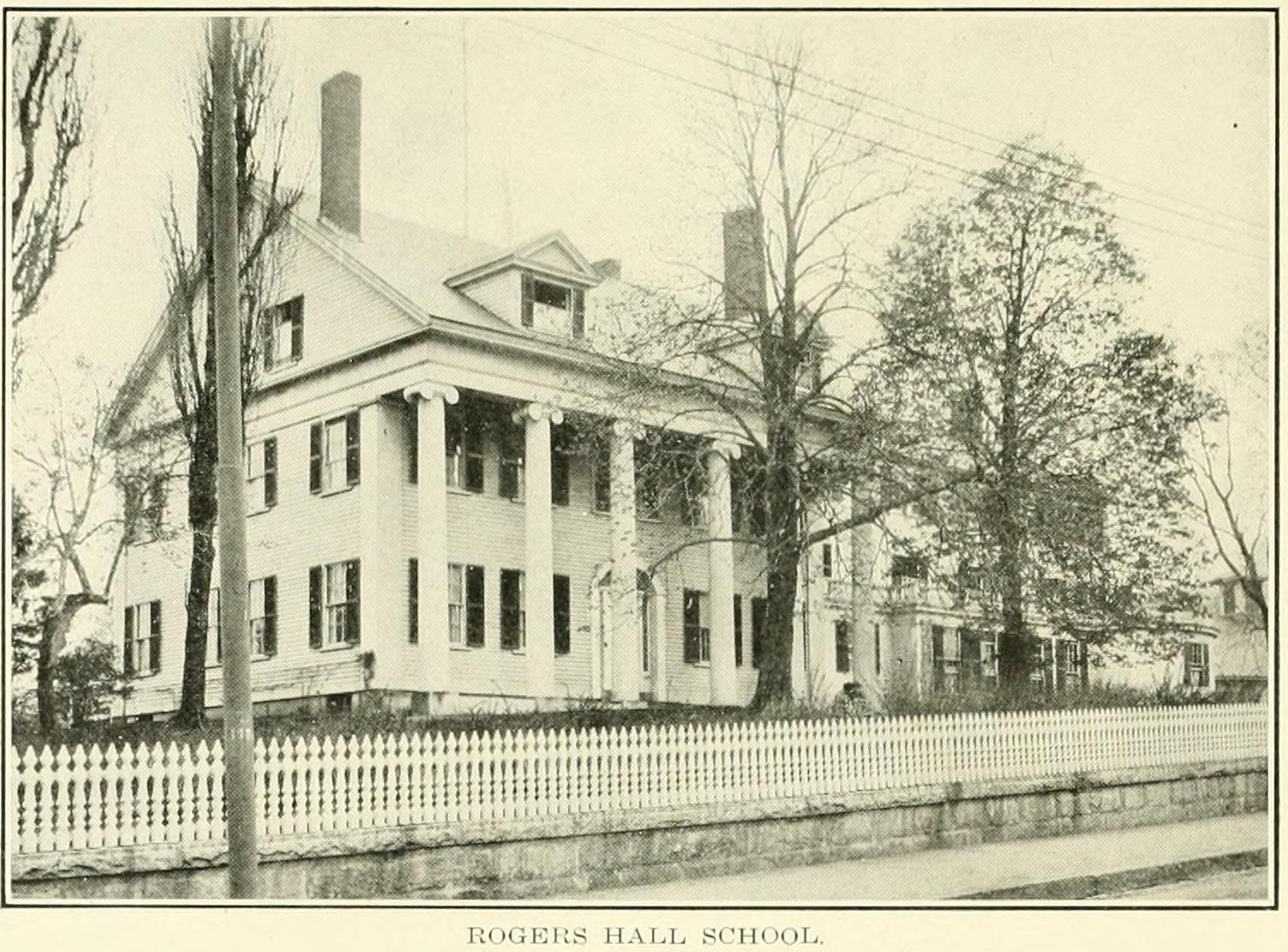
- Lowell, Massachusetts

Information
- School type: Private, All-Girls
- Established: 1892
- Founder: Elizabeth Rogers
- Closed: 1973

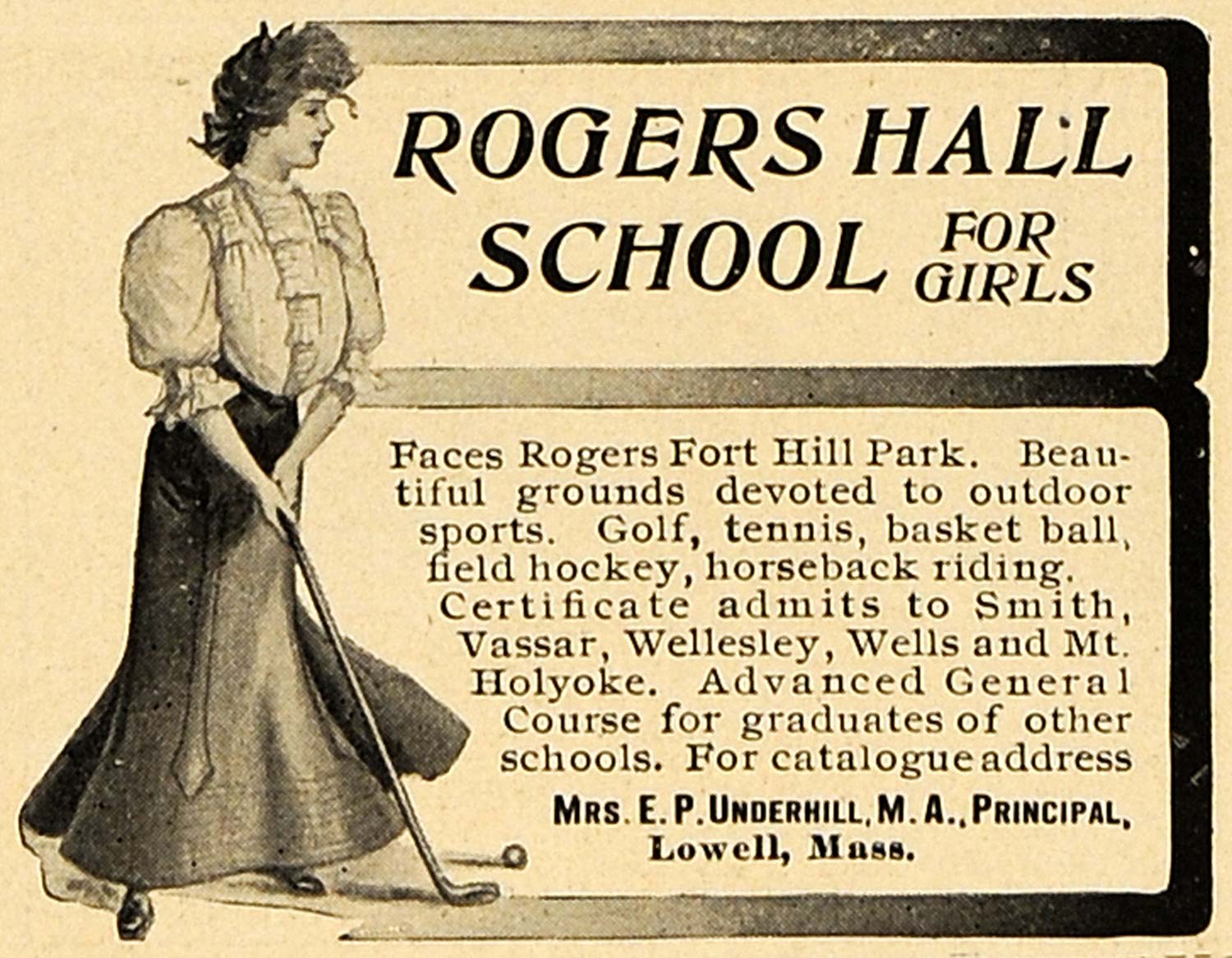
A 1906 advertisement for the Rogers Hall School

Rogers Hall School was a college preparatory finishing school for girls with day and boarding students in Lowell, Massachusetts.

Roger's Hall School was founded by Emily and Elizabeth Rogers, who inherited the main building in 1880. Emily, who had been taught by Mary Lyon at Miss Grant's Girls' School for two years, came up with the idea of donating the school's property donated their family's property for the school. Though the sisters had planned on donating the land upon their deaths, and Elizabeth persisted in this vision after Emily's 1884 death of pneumonia. Elizabeth decided to donate it in 1892, after meeting E.P. Underhill, who had opened a girls' school in Belvedere. Elizabeth proposed that Underhill be the principal for the school, and she agreed, remaining at the school for 18 years. After Elizabeth's death, her estate of about $130,000 was left to Rogers Hall

The school sat on about five acres of the over two-hundred acres the sisters had inherited. In 1892, the school opened with 11 faculty, 41 residential students, and nine day students. The school expected the students to follow the strict Christian ideals that the Rogers sisters had led. This included a strict schedule, with nightly checks of students' stockings for straightness, evaluations of table manners, and lights out by 9:30.

The school was made of four buildings. Rogers Hall, the original school building, later housed boarders. Other boarders stayed at Rogers House, a Victorian mansion near the other buildings. The school also included Rogers Cottage. Finally, the Gymnasium was famous for being the first gymnasium in a private girls' secondary school in the country to have a pool. The pool was built in 1922.

The school's literary magazine was known as Splinters.

The school had its peak enrollment in the 1955, with over 100 students. By the 1970s, though, enrollment had fallen to just 47 students, and the school closed its doors in 1973.

The property is now an apartment complex for seniors and people with disabilities.

The school archives are in the collection of the University of Massachusetts at Lowell.

== Alumni ==
- Blanche Ames Ames
- Starr Faithfull (dropped out shortly before graduation)
- Edith Nourse Rogers
- Anne Sexton
- Rebecca Tobey

== Notable people ==
- Frederic T. Greenhalge, trustee
- Frederick Lawton, trustee
