= Rebecca Tobey =

American artist

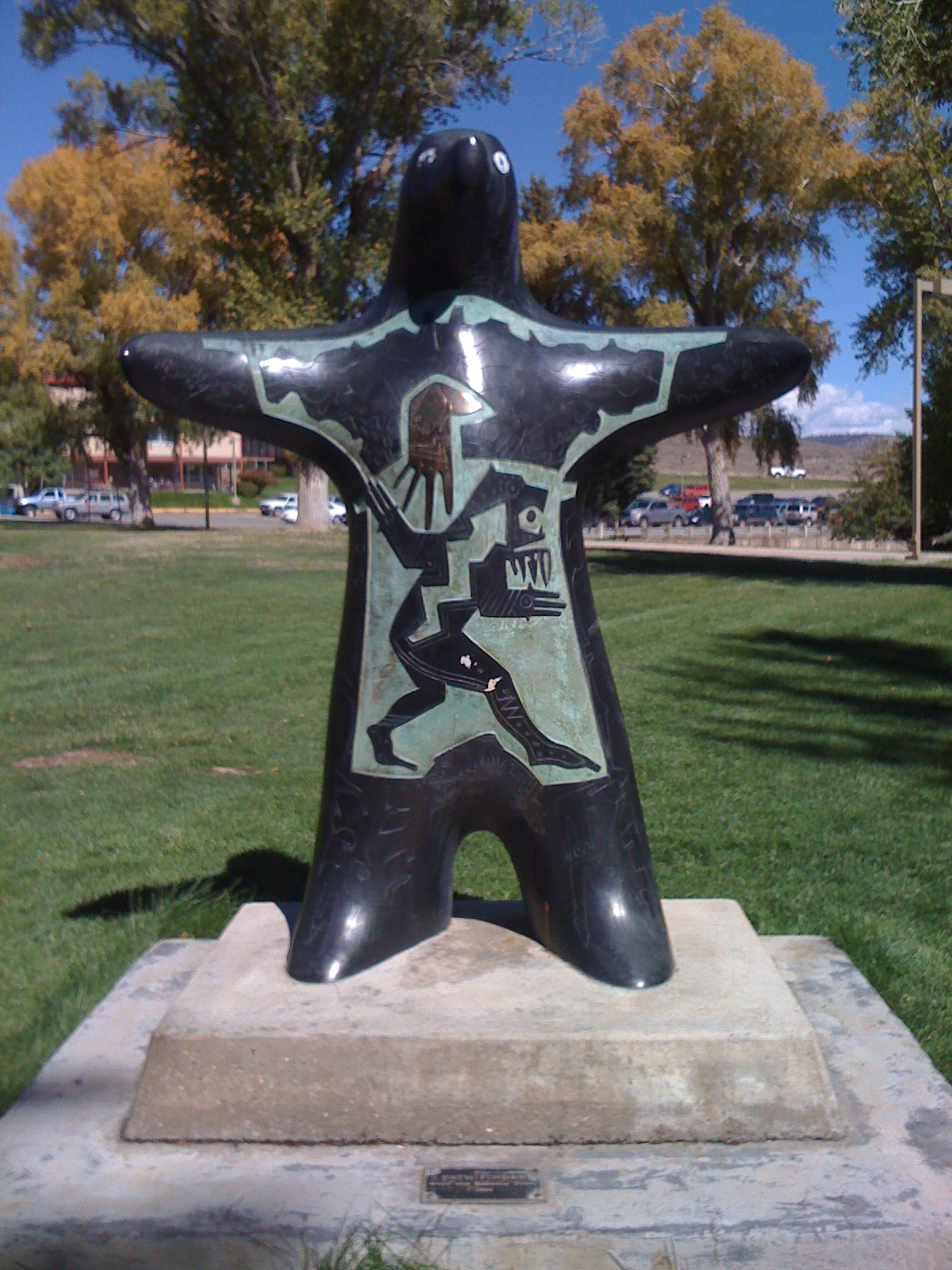
- "Path Finder" by Rebecca and Gene Tobey
- Born: Rebecca Upton; 1948 (age 77–78); Ann Arbor, Michigan, USA
- Occupation: Artist of ceramic animal sculptures

Rebecca Tobey is an American artist from Santa Fe, New Mexico, who creates ceramic, brass, and patina animal sculptures in both modern and abstract styles. Along with her husband, Gene, she worked for decades to create animal forms. Her artworks, inspired by the mythologies of the Native Americans, have been commissioned by the government and private institutions, and exhibited worldwide.

== Early life ==
Rebecca Tobey was born Rebecca Upton in 1948 in Ann Arbor, Michigan to Arthur and Elizabeth. She was raised in eastern Tennessee, where her father was a scientist at Oak Ridge and her mother was a graphic designer. Throughout her childhood, she was fascinated with animals and nature. She and her siblings spent their summer holidays at a resort on Watts Bar Lake in Tennessee.

Tobey left Tennessee to study at the Rogers Hall School, a boarding school in Lowell, Massachusetts, where her teachers told her that she was not talented enough to become an artist. Tobey obtained a BA and MA degree in theater arts from Adelphi University and later started her professional life in Long Island, New York.

== Move to Santa Fe ==
Initially, Tobey lived and worked in New York City; however, during a 1975 stopover in Santa Fe, New Mexico, she was inspired to spontaneously move there. She worked as the director of a Santa Fe art gallery and met Gene Tobey, who had held an exhibition of his raku pottery; the duo started collaborating on artwork. Initially, they made ceramics, but from the later part of 1990s, the pair began using other mediums, such as bronze and patina. In 1997, Rebecca and Gene created their first sculpture, "Wind River," which they exhibited at Western State College, Gunnison, Colorado, where their children were studying. Their second sculpture was a large, curved buffalo named "The Tobey Buffalo". "Rising Star," another buffalo sculpture, was smaller and carved in bronze. The animal forms they created were inspired by Native American mythologies.

Tobey creates animal sculptures with overlaid features, based on her conceptual thinking and pictures. Some of her ceramic sculptures are inscribed with graffiti and perforations which "create interesting compositions using negative space." She created many sculptures with her husband, such as the 15 feet (4.6 m) "Spirit Walker" bear sculpture, which was exhibited and donated to the Law School of Baylor University in 2000; the sculpture's surface is inscribed with sketches of the history of Waco. "Pathfinder," her bronze sculpture of a 5 feet (1.5 m)-tall grizzly bear, is on display at the Western State College; it is considered a lucky charm by students, who kiss the statue before taking an examination.

One of Tobey's notable works, a "prong-horned antelope with hand prints and eagles in flight," was auctioned for the Cancer Foundation for New Mexico, which she supports.

== Personal life ==
Rebecca met Gene in Santa Fe, New Mexico in 1984. They opened a new gallery called "Gallery Five" in Santa Fe's Springer Plaza, the following year, but it had to be closed down in August 1985 due to lack of clientele. In November 1985 they married and later collaborated to create ceramic sculptures, starting with dishes and common use ceramics leading to emblematic animals. Gene died of leukemia in 2006. Tobey currently resides in Santa Fe, New Mexico.

== Works by Gene and Rebecca Tobey ==
A partial list of Gene and Rebecca Tobey's art works:

- American Bear
- Apache
- Cherokee
- Dakota
- Dine' - The People
- Earthbound
- Eclipse of the Sun
- Freedom
- Friends in a Storm
- Hummingbird
- Keeper of the Trust
- Kiowa
- Maasai II Moran
- Monica's Vision
- Pathfinder
- Spirit Guardian
- Wind River
- Zuni

=== Books ===
With her husband Gene Tobey, she authored a book titled Partners in Art: Gene and Rebecca Tobey, in which she recounts the 20 years of their collaborative works.
