= Smith Canal =

Waterway in Stockton, California

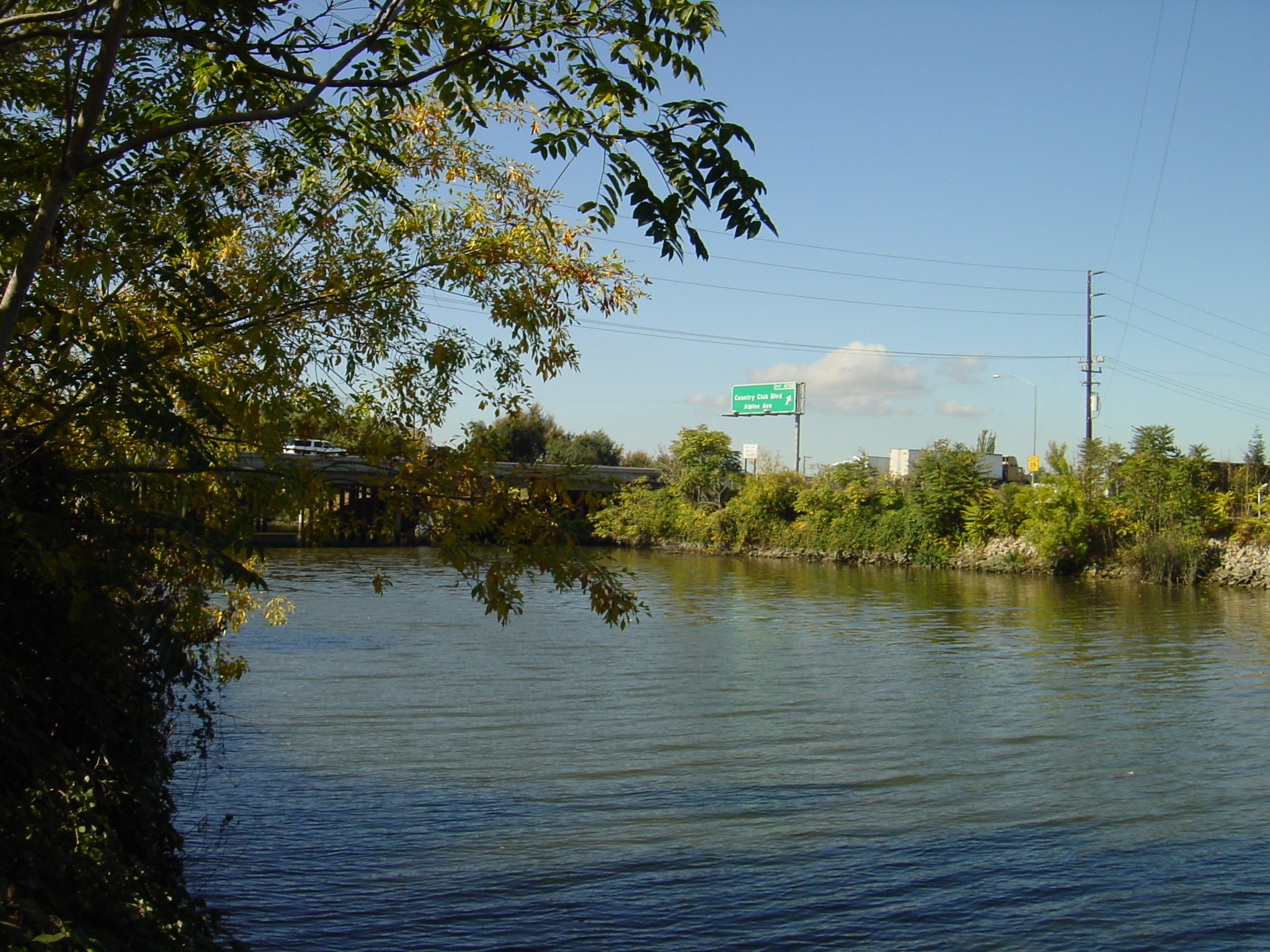
- The Smith Canal under the West Side Freeway
- Interactive map of Smith Canal
- Location: Stockton, California
- Country: United States
- Coordinates: 37°57′44.66″N 121°19′48.13″W

Specifications
- Length: 2.4 miles (3.9 km) (originally 3 mi or 4.8 km)
- Locks: None
- Status: Open

Geography
- Start point: San Joaquin River

The Smith Canal is a former barge canal in Stockton, California, United States. It currently runs approximately 2.4 miles (3.9 km) east-northeast from the San Joaquin River, although it previously ran about 0.65 miles (1.05 km) further to El Dorado Street. It was built to carry agricultural produce to the Stockton State Hospital. Today the canal is lined with residential homes and docks for pleasure boats. The eastern end is now known as Yosemite Lake.

== History ==
When the crew of the British Euphemia heard of gold deposits in the Sierra foothills, they abandoned ship in San Francisco Bay. During the War of 1812 it was seized by the US, who used it as a cargo vessel in the China trade before it was again abandoned. The City of San Francisco bought the ship in October 1849 for $3,000 in and turned it into a floating prison, and later as an asylum for the mentally ill.

When the Stockton State Hospital became the Insane Asylum of the State of California in 1853, the Euphemia was shipped up the San Joaquin. Its patients unloaded and transferred to the hospital, a short distance to the north. The ship returned to San Francisco and was once again abandoned. Its hulk was discovered in 1921 during excavations near Battery and Sacramento streets during construction of the Federal Reserve Bank of San Francisco.

As the number of inmates at the hospital grew, it strained the local road network's ability to carry food and other supplies. Farmer Charles Smith owned a number of fields around the area, and dredged his irrigation canal deep enough for barges. It ran to a point just north of the hospital. It was used for some time before Union Pacific train tracks behind the hospital and upgrades to local roads made it superfluous. Over the years, the eastern end was repeatedly backfilled until it reached its current end at what is known as Yosemite Lake.

In 2016 plans for a flood-control gate at the entrance of the canal were approved by the San Joaquin Area Flood Control Agency (SJAFCA). Construction of the flood-control gate began in 2020, and the structure was completed in 2024.

== Route ==
The Smith Canal is almost perfectly straight, running east-northeast from the San Joaquin River between Atherton Island and Louis Park. It ends at a turning basin known as Yosemite Lake. The canal roughly parallels the developed section of the San Joaquin that leads to the Port of Stockton, which is a short distance to the south.
