= Edith Nourse Rogers =

American politician (1881–1960)

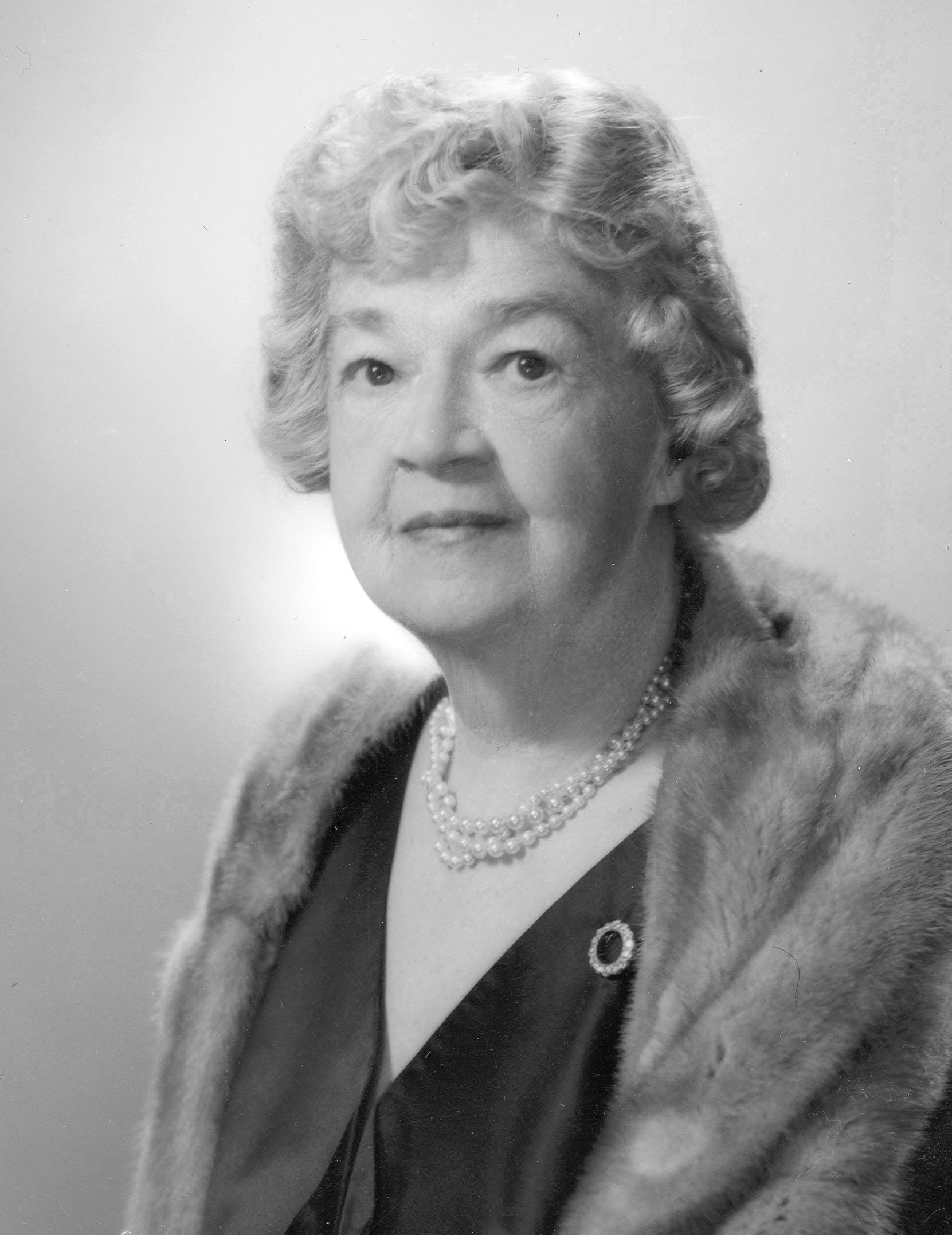
- Rogers c. 1950

Chair of the House Veterans' Affairs Committee
- In office January 3, 1953 – January 3, 1955
- Preceded by: John E. Rankin
- Succeeded by: Olin E. Teague
- In office January 3, 1947 – January 3, 1949
- Preceded by: Position established
- Succeeded by: John E. Rankin

Member of the U.S. House of Representatives from Massachusetts's 5th district
- In office June 30, 1925 – September 10, 1960
- Preceded by: John Jacob Rogers
- Succeeded by: F. Bradford Morse

Personal details
- Born: Edith Nourse; March 19, 1881 Saco, Maine, U.S.
- Died: September 10, 1960 (aged 79) Boston, Massachusetts, U.S.
- Party: Republican
- Spouse: John Jacob Rogers (m. 1907; died 1925)
- Rogers's voice Rogers speaks in support of declaring war on Japan; Recorded December 8, 1941

Edith Rogers (née Nourse; March 19, 1881 – September 10, 1960) was an American social welfare volunteer and Republican Party politician who represented Massachusetts in the United States House of Representatives from 1925 until her death in 1960. She was the first woman elected to Congress from New England, the longest-serving woman in Congress until 2012, and the longest-serving woman in the House of Representatives until 2018.

Rogers was born in Maine and educated by private tutors before attending Rogers Hall School and a finishing school in France. Her 1907 marriage to John Jacob Rogers drew her into politics, and her husband was elected to the United States House of Representatives in 1912 as a member of the Republican Party. During World War I, the couple traveled to Europe as part of his duties on the House Committee on Foreign Affairs and brief enlistment as a private in 1918. While in London and France, Edith Rogers volunteered with the American Red Cross and was first exposed to the suffering of wounded soldiers; she continued as a Red Cross volunteer upon return to the United States at Walter Reed Army Medical Center.

In 1925, John Rogers died in office, and Edith was recruited by the Republican Party and American Legion to run for his vacant seat in a special election. She defeated former Massachusetts governor Eugene Foss in an electoral landslide, becoming the sixth woman elected to Congress. As a U.S. representative for the next 35 years, Rogers sponsored critical legislation in support of veterans during World War II, including the Serviceman's Readjustment Act and the bills creating the Women's Auxiliary Corps and Women's Army Corps. After the war, she chaired the House Committee on Veterans' Affairs for two crucial terms. In 1932, she successfully talked down a troubled Marine veteran, Marlin Kemmerer, who threatened House members with a pistol.

In addition to her work on veterans' affairs, Rogers opposed American involvement in World War II prior to the Pearl Harbor attack and early American involvement in the Vietnam War. She was critical of the persecution of Jews in Germany under Adolf Hitler and supported both the Red Scare and the American civil rights movement.

== Early life and education ==
Edith Nourse was born on March 19, 1881, in Saco, Maine, to Franklin T. Nourse and Edith France Riversmith, both descendants of old New England families. Her father was the manager of a textile mill, and her mother was a volunteer for Christian and social causes. Until the age of fourteen, Edith was privately tutored. She then attended Rogers Hall School, a private boarding school for girls in Lowell, Massachusetts, and Madame Julien's, a finishing school in Neuilly-sur-Seine, France.

== Marriage and early social work ==
In 1907, Nourse married attorney John Jacob Rogers, and he established a practice in Lowell. In 1911, John started a career in politics, by working in city government and as Lowell school commissioner. In 1912, he was elected to represent Massachusetts's 5th congressional district in the United States House of Representatives as a member of the Republican Party.

During John's tenure in the House, World War I began. As a member of the House Committee on Foreign Affairs, he traveled to the United Kingdom and France to observe the war firsthand and enlisted briefly as a private in an artillery training battalion from September 2 to November 29, 1918. While traveling with her husband, Edith volunteered with the YMCA and American Red Cross, where she witnessed the conditions faced by civilian women employees and volunteers at United States Army camps, who lacked housing, food, insurance, medical care, pensions, and compensation, in contrast with the professional benefits afforded to women in the British Army. After returning to the United States, she volunteered at Walter Reed Army Medical Center.

After the war, John and Edith Rogers joined the American Legion and its women's auxiliary, respectively. In 1922, Warren G. Harding appointed her as the inspector of new United States veterans' hospitals, and she took a nominal one-dollar salary. She was reappointed to that position by Calvin Coolidge and Herbert Hoover. In 1924, she was elected as a presidential elector from Massachusetts, supporting Coolidge.

== United States Representative (1925–60) ==
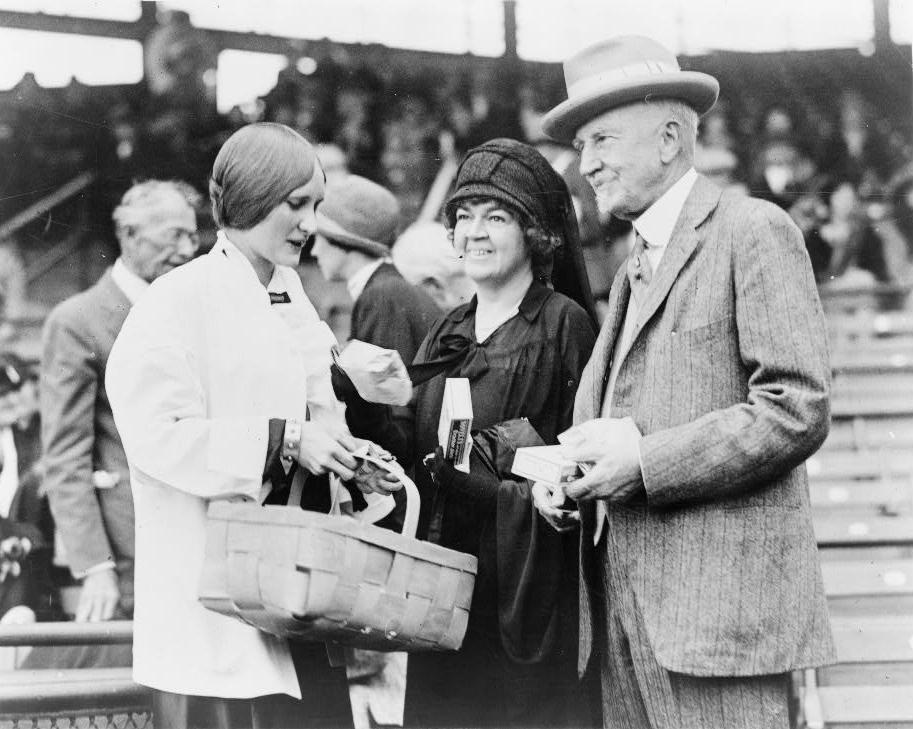
Rogers (center) at the Congressional Baseball Game.

John Rogers died on March 28, 1925. She was recruited by the Republican Party and American Legion to run in the special election for his vacant seat, and she defeated former Massachusetts governor Eugene Foss with 72 percent of the vote. Her election made her the first woman elected to Congress from New England and the sixth elected overall.

Rogers was ultimately re-elected seventeen times, serving until her death in 1960. She continued to win strong majorities and was the longest serving woman in the history of Congress until surpassed by Barbara Mikulski in 2012.

She chaired the Committee on Veterans' Affairs from 1947 to 1948 and again from 1953 to 1954, during the 80th and 83rd Congresses. She was also the first woman to preside as Speaker pro tempore over the House of Representatives.

On December 13, 1932, Rogers, Melvin Maas, and Fiorello La Guardia subdued Marlin Kemmerer, a distraught Marine veteran who brandished a pistol in the House chamber and demanded a right to speak. Kemmerer was released a month later at the request of House members.

=== Wagner–Rogers Bill ===
Rogers was one of the earliest members of Congress to speak out against the persecution of Jews in Germany under Adolf Hitler. After the failure of the Évian Conference, she co-sponsored the Wagner–Rogers Bill on February 14, 1939. The proposed legislation would have modified quotas under the Immigration Act of 1924 to permit 20,000 German Jewish refugees under the age of fourteen to settle in the United States with support from private organizations and individuals. However, the bill failed after opposition from nativist groups and neutrality from President Franklin D. Roosevelt.

== Political views ==
Rogers was regarded as capable by her male peers and became a model for younger Congresswomen. Her trademark was an orchid or a gardenia on her shoulder. She was also an active legislator and sponsored more than 1,200 bills, over half on veteran or military issues. She voted for a permanent nurse corps in the Department of Veteran's Affairs, and benefits for disabled veterans and veterans of the Korean War.

In 1937 she sponsored a bill to fund the maintenance of the neglected Congressional Cemetery, even though her husband was placed at rest in their hometown. She opposed child labor, and fought for "equal pay for equal work" and a 48-hour workweek for women, though she believed a woman's first priority was home and family. She supported local economic autonomy; on April 19, 1934, she read a petition against the expanded business regulations of the New Deal, and all 1,200 signatures, into the Congressional Record. Rogers voted in favor of the Civil Rights Acts of 1957 and 1960.

Rogers was an advocate for the textile and leather industries in Massachusetts. She acquired funding for flood control measures in the Merrimack River basin, helped Camp Devens become Fort Devens, Massachusetts in 1931, and was responsible for many other jobs and grants in the state.

In 1935 Rogers twice introduced resolutions to authorize funding for traffic safety studies, eventually resulting in $75,000 for Bureau of Public Roads to study traffic safety conditions.

A confidential 1943 analysis of the House Foreign Affairs Committee by Isaiah Berlin for the British Foreign Office described Rogers as

an Isolationist up to and including the Lend-Lease, after which, however, she swung in behind the President on all major foreign policy measures. Though she is likely to continue her support, she will only do so after she has convinced herself that America's own best interests are thoroughly protected and that the Administration is not trying to "put something across." She is regarded in Congress as a capable, hard-working and intelligent woman. A pleasant and kindly old battle-axe— but a battle-axe. An Episcopalian; age 62. Probably nationalist rather than internationalist in outlook.

It is noted in the private papers of ETO Logistics Chief Lt. Gen. John C. H. Lee that she was received at Cherbourg, France on 4 October 1944. The following day she decorated Col. Benjamin B. Talley, commander of operations at Omaha Beach on and after D-Day with the Legion of Merit for his work in operating the beach-port at Omaha.

== WAAC ==
Women had served in the United States military before. In 1901, a female Nurse Corps was established in the Army Medical Department and in 1907 a Navy Nurse Corps was established. However, despite their uniforms the nurses were civilian employees with few benefits. They slowly gained additional privileges, including "relative ranks" and insignia in 1920, a retirement pension in 1926, and a disability pension if injured in the line of duty in 1926. Rogers voted to support the pensions.

The first American women enlisted into the regular armed forces were 13,000 women admitted into active duty in the Navy and Marines during World War I, and a much smaller number admitted into the Coast Guard. These "Yeomanettes" and "women Marines" primarily served in clerical positions. They received the same benefits and responsibilities as men, including identical pay, and were treated as veterans after the war. These women were quickly demobilized when hostilities ceased, and aside from the Nurse Corps, the soldiery became once again exclusively male. In contrast, the army clerks and "Hello Girls" who worked the telephones during World War I were civilian contractors with no benefits.

Rogers' volunteer work in World War I exposed her to the status of the women with the United States Army, and the much more egalitarian role of women in the British Army. With this inspiration and model, Edith Rogers introduced a bill to the 76th Congress in early 1941 to establish a Women's Army Auxiliary Corps (WAAC) during World War II. The bill was intended to free men for combat duty by creating a cadre of 25,000 noncombatant clerical workers. The bill languished in the face of strong opposition to women in the army, and indifference in the face of higher priorities like the lend-lease bill, price controls, and ramping up war production.

After the December 7, 1941 attack on Pearl Harbor, manpower shortages threatened as productivity increased. Rogers approached the Army Chief of Staff George Marshall, and with his strong support she reintroduced the bill to the 77th Congress with a new upper limit of 150,000 women, and an amendment giving the women full military status. The amendment was resoundingly rejected but the unamended bill passed, and on May 14, 1942, President Franklin Delano Roosevelt's signature turned "An Act to Establish the Women's Army Auxiliary Corps" into Public Law 77-554.

While "Auxiliaries", and thus not a part of the regular army, the WAACs were given food, clothing, housing, medical care, training, and pay. They did not receive death benefits, medical care as veterans, retirement or disability pensions, or overseas pay. They were given auxiliary ranks which granted no command authority over men, and also earned less than men with comparable regular army ranks, until November 1, 1942, when legislation equalized their remuneration. Since they were not regular army they were not governed by army regulations, and if captured, were not protected by international conventions regarding the treatment of prisoners of war (POWs).

On July 30, 1942, Public Law 77-554 created the WAVES (Women Accepted for Volunteer Emergency Service) in the Navy. The law passed with no significant opposition, despite granting the WAVES full status as military reserves, under the same Naval regulations that applied to men. The WAVES were granted equal pay and benefits, but no retirement or disability pensions and were restricted to noncombat duties in the continental United States. The similarly empowered SPARS (from the motto Semper Paratus/"Always Ready") in the Coast Guard, and the Marine Corps Women's Reserve soon followed. The September 27, 1944, Public Law 78-441 allowed WAVES to also serve in Alaska and Hawaii.

The initial goal of 25,000 WAACs by June 30, 1943, was passed in November 1942. The goal was reset at 150,000, the maximum allowed by law, but competition from sister units like the WAVES and the private war industry, the retention of high educational and moral standards, underuse of skilled WAACs, and a spate of vicious gossip and bad publicity in 1943 prevented the goal from ever being reached.

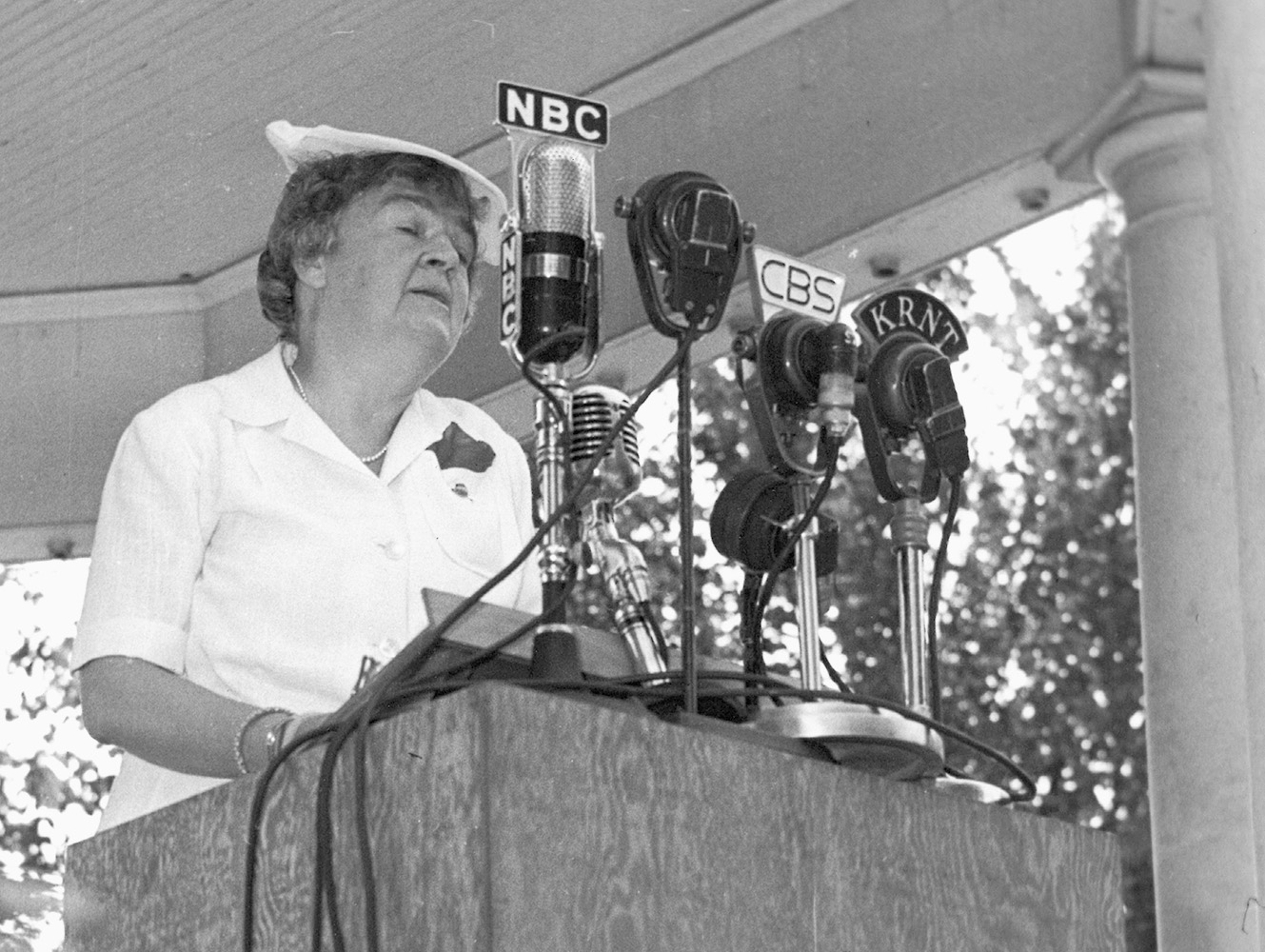
Congresswoman Edith Nourse Rogers addresses the graduates of the first WAAC officer candidate class at Fort Des Moines, August 29, 1942.

The rumors of immoral conduct were widely published by the press without verification, and harmed morale. Investigations by the War Department and Edith Rogers uncovered nothing; and the incidence of disorderly and criminal conduct among the WAACs was a tiny fraction of that among the male military population, venereal disease was almost non-existent, and the pregnancy rate was far below civilian women. Despite this, the June 30, 1943, enlistment reached 60,000.

== Women's Army Corps ==
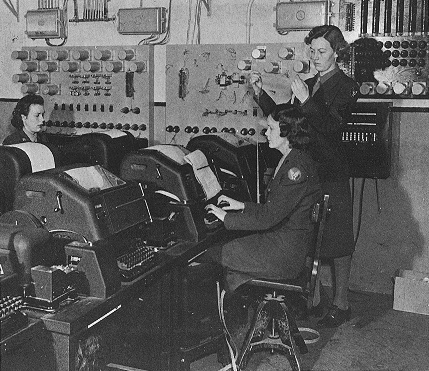
WACs assigned to the Eighth Air Force in England operate teletype machines.

Edith Rogers introduced a bill in October 1942 to make the WAACs a formal part of the United States Army Reserve. Fearing it would hinder other war legislation, George Marshall declined to support it and it failed. He changed his mind in 1943, and asked Congress to give the WAAC full military status. Experience showed that the two separate systems were too difficult to manage. Rogers and Oveta Culp Hobby, the first Director of the WAACs, drafted a new bill which was debated in the House for six months before passing. On July 1, 1943, Roosevelt signed "An Act to Establish the Women's Army Corps in the Army of the United States", which became Public Law 78-110. The "auxiliary" portion of the name was officially dropped, and on July 5, 1943, Hobby was commissioned as a full colonel, the highest rank allowed in the new Women's Army Corps.

The WACs received the same pay, allowances, and benefits as regular army units, though time spent as a WAC did not count toward time served and the allowance for dependents was heavily restricted. The WACs were now disciplined, promoted, and given the same legal protections as regular Army units, and the 150,000 ceiling was lifted. While the legislators made it very clear they expected the WACs to be noncombatants, the bill contained no specific restrictions. Existing Army regulations still prohibited them from combat training with weapons, tactical exercises, duty assignments requiring weapons, supervising men, and jobs requiring great physical strength, unless waived by the United States Secretary of War; but of the 628 Army specialties, women now qualified for 406. Additional Army regulations were adopted to cover pregnancy, marriage, and maternity care.

As part of the regular Army, WACs could not be permanently assigned as cooks, waitresses, janitors, or to any other civilian jobs. While most became clerks, secretaries, and drivers, they also became mechanics, weather observers, radio operators, medical technicians, intelligence analysts, chaplains, postal workers, and heavy equipment operators. The restriction against combat training and carrying weapons was waived in several cases, allowing women to serve as pay officers, military police, in code rooms, or as drivers in some overseas areas. On January 10, 1943, a 200-WAC unit was even trained as an antiaircraft gun crew, though they were not allowed to fire the 90 mm weapon. Several were also assigned to the Manhattan Project.

WACs also served overseas, and close to the front lines. During the invasion of Italy by the U.S. Fifth Army under Lieutenant General Mark W. Clark, a 60-woman platoon served in the advance headquarters, sometimes only a few miles from the front lines; and in the south Pacific WACs moved into Manila, Philippines only three days after occupation. By V-J Day, one fifth had served overseas.

On V-E Day, May 8, 1945, WACs reached their peak of 99,388 women in active duty, and a total of more than 140,000 WACs served during World War II. The majority served in the Army Service Forces, but large numbers also served as "Air WACs" in the Army Air Force, largely because of the enthusiastic and early support of General Henry H. Arnold, and in the Army Medical Corps. Only 2,000 served in the combat-heavy Army Ground Force.

Despite the noncombatant status of her directorate, Oveta Hobby was awarded the Distinguished Service Medal, the third-highest U.S. Army decoration and the highest one which can be awarded for non-combat service. The WACs were awarded a total of 62 Legions of Merit, 565 Bronze Stars, 3 Air Medals, and 16 Purple Hearts.

The initial bill called for the WACs to be discontinued 6 months after the President declared the war was at an end, but despite the resistance in the House and the smear campaign, the WACs performed capably and well. According to Dwight D. Eisenhower, "During the time I have had WACs under my command they have met every test and task assigned to them.... Their contributions in efficiency, skill, spirit, and determination are immeasurable." Douglas MacArthur called them "my best soldiers". With the rush to send as many men home as quickly as possible after the cessation of hostilities, WACs were even more in demand.

Supported by Eisenhower, the "Act to Establish a Permanent Nurse Corps of the Army and Navy and to Establish a Women's Medical Specialists Corps in the Army", or the Army-Navy Nurses Act of 1947, passed and became Public Law 8036, granting regular, permanent status to female nurses. Then in early 1946, Chief of Staff Eisenhower ordered legislation drafted to make the WACs a permanent part of the armed forces. The bill was unanimously approved by the Senate but the House Armed Forces Committee amended the bill to restrict women to reserve status, with only Representative Margaret Chase Smith dissenting.

After vehement objection by Eisenhower, who wrote "the women of America must share the responsibility for the security of their country in a future emergency as the women of England did in World War II"; the personal testimony of Secretary of Defense James Forrestal; and support from every major military commander including the Chief of Naval Operations Fleet Admiral Chester W. Nimitz, and MacArthur, the Commander of United States Army Forces in the Far East, who wrote, "we cannot ask these women to remain on duty, nor can we ask qualified personnel to volunteer, if we cannot offer them permanent status"; supporting articles in The New York Times and The Christian Science Monitor, and the support of Senator and future President Lyndon B. Johnson and Representative Edith Rogers, the amended bill passed in the House but was rejected in the Senate. A compromise restored the original wording but limited the total number of women allowed to serve for the first few years, which then passed regular army, which was submitted to Congress in 1947 in the midst of a massive reorganization of the unanimously in the Senate, and 206 to 133 in the House. On June 12, 1948, President Harry Truman signed the "Women's Armed Services Integration Act", making it Public Law 80-625.

On December 3, 1948, the Director of the WACs, Colonel Mary A. Hallaren, became the first commissioned female officer in the U.S. Army. The WACs still were not equal. They were limited in numbers, had no command authority over men, were restricted from combat training and duties, had additional restrictions on claiming dependents, and aside from their director, no woman could be promoted above the rank of lieutenant colonel. WACs served in the Korean and Vietnam Wars.

On November 8, 1967, Congress lifted the restriction on promotions, allowing the first WAC generals, and then, on October 29, 1978, the Women's Army Corps was disestablished and women were integrated into the rest of the Army.

== G.I. Bill ==
In 1944, Edith Rogers helped draft, and then co-sponsored the G. I. Bill, with Representative John E. Rankin, and Senators Ernest McFarland, and Bennett Champ Clark. The bill provided for education and vocational training, low-interest loans for homes, farms, and businesses, and limited unemployment benefits for returning servicemen. On June 22, 1944, President Franklin D. Roosevelt signed "The Servicemen's Readjustment Act", which became Public Law 78-346 and handed her the first pen. As a result of the bill, roughly half of the returning veterans went on to higher education.

In August 2019, as part of the Forever GI Bill, the Edith Nourse Rogers Science Technology Engineering Math (STEM) Scholarship will be available to veterans pursuing STEM careers. This scholarship will allow recipients to receive up to nine additional months Post-9/11 GI Bill benefits.

== After World War II ==
During the Cold War Rogers supported the House Committee on Un-American Activities and Senator Joseph McCarthy during the "Red Scare". Although she supported the United Nations, in 1953 she said that UN headquarters should be expelled from the U.S. if communist China were admitted. In 1954, she opposed sending U.S. soldiers to Vietnam.

She was considered a formidable candidate for U.S. Senate in 1958 against the much younger John F. Kennedy, but decided not to run.

== Death and legacy ==
Edith Rogers died on September 10, 1960, at Philips House, Massachusetts General Hospital, in Boston, Massachusetts in the midst of her 19th Congressional campaign. She was interred with her husband in Lowell Cemetery, in their hometown of Lowell.

She received many honors during her life, including the Distinguished Service Medal of the American Legion in 1950. In honor of her work with veterans, the Edith Nourse Rogers Memorial Veterans Hospital in Bedford, Massachusetts bears her name.

The Women's Army Corps Museum (now the United States Army Women's Museum), established on May 14, 1955, in Fort McClellan, Alabama, was renamed the Edith Nourse Rogers Museum on August 18, 1961, but returned to its original name on May 14, 1977.

The Edith Nourse Rogers Stem Academy in Lowell, Massachusetts is named after Edith Rogers. Among its famous graduates is former Congressman, and current chancellor of The University of Massachusetts Lowell, Marty Meehan, who served in the U.S. House of Representatives from January 5, 1993, to July 1, 2007. Edith Nourse Rogers Stem Academy serves approximately 1200 students in grades K through 8.

In 1998, Rogers was inducted into the National Women's Hall of Fame.

Governor Deval Patrick signed a Proclamation declaring June 30, 2012, as "Congresswoman Edith Nourse Rogers Day."

== See also ==
- List of members of the United States Congress who died in office (1950–1999)
- Women in the United States House of Representatives

U.S. House of Representatives
Preceded by John Rogers	Member of the U.S. House of Representatives from Massachusetts's 5th congressional district 1925–1960	Succeeded by Bradford Morse
Preceded by John Rankin	Chair of the House Veterans' Affairs Committee; 1947–1949	Succeeded by John Rankin
Preceded by John Rankin	Chair of the House Veterans' Affairs Committee; 1953–1955	Succeeded by Olin Teague
