= Harry W. Colmery =

National Commander of The American Legion from 1936 to 1937

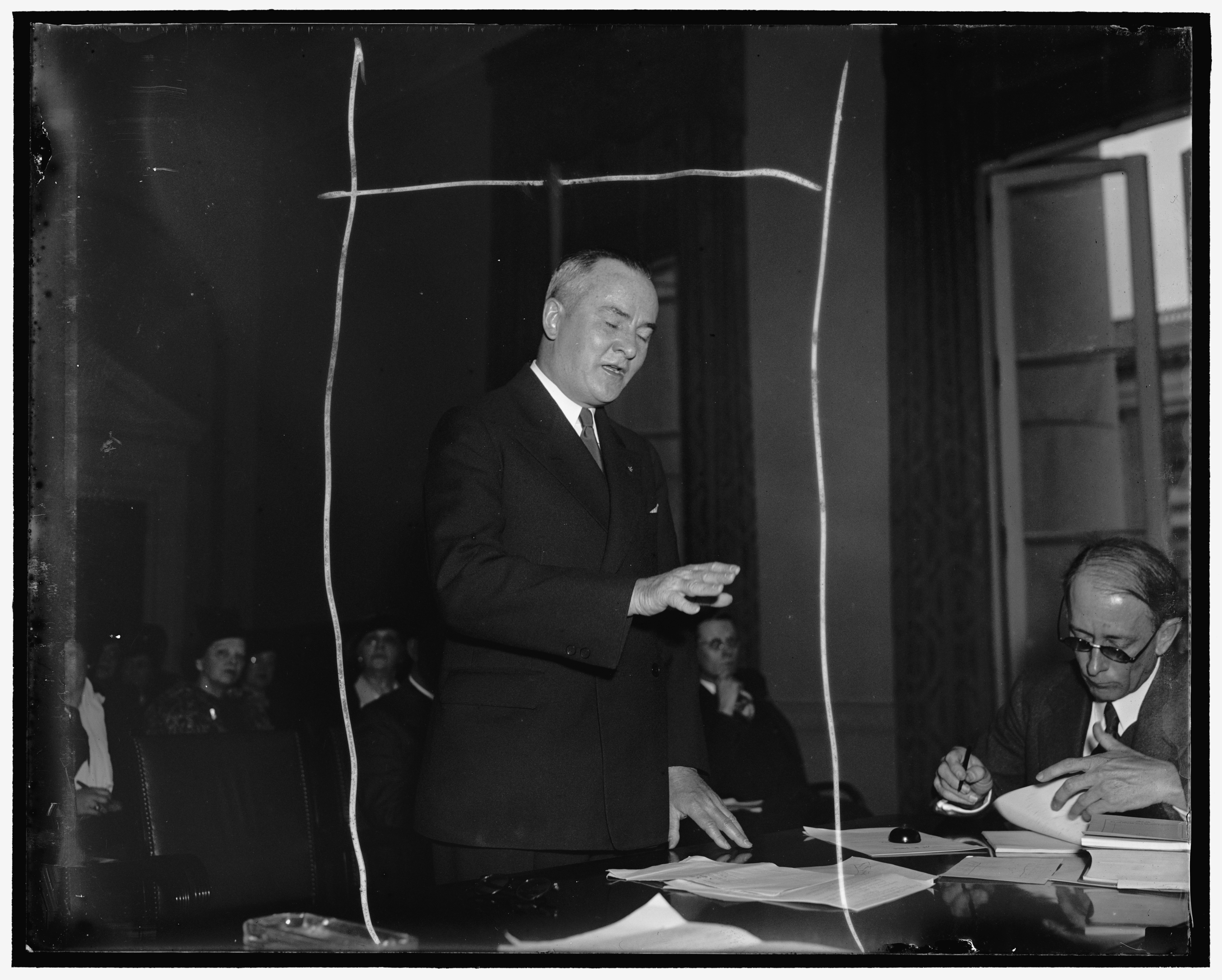
- Colmery in 1937
- Born: Harry Walter Colmery; December 11, 1890; North Braddock, Pennsylvania, U.S.
- Died: August 23, 1979 (aged 88); Houston, Texas, U.S.
- Resting place: Mount Hope Cemetery, Topeka, Kansas, U.S. 39°02′25.2″N 95°44′19.6″W
- Education: Oberlin College; University of Pittsburgh
- Occupation: Lawyer
- Known for: Principal architect of G.I. Bill
- Title: National Commander of The American Legion
- Term: 1936 – 1937
- Predecessor: Ray Murphy
- Successor: Daniel J. Doherty
- Spouse: Minerva Harriet Colmery (m. 1919; died 1956)
- Children: 3
- Military career
- Allegiance: United States
- Branch: United States Army
- Service years: 1917–1919
- Rank: First Lieutenant
- Unit: Air Service
- Conflicts: World War I
- Awards: World War I Victory Medal

Harry W. Colmery (December 11, 1890 – August 23, 1979) was an American lawyer who served as the National Commander of The American Legion from 1936 to 1937. Considered an author of the G.I. Bill, he was the first past national commander to earn the Legion's Distinguished Service Medal in 1975.

== Early life and education ==
Born in North Braddock, Pennsylvania to Walter and Flora Colmery, Harry Walter Colmery was one of four children. He graduated from Oberlin College in 1913, from law school at the University of Pittsburgh in 1916, and was admitted to the Utah bar in 1917.

== World War I ==
Colmery served in the United States Army Air Service during World War I as an instructor and pursuit pilot. He was honorably discharged on April 24, 1919.

== Personal life ==
Colmery married his college sweetheart, Minerva Harriet Hiserodt, on December 20, 1919. They had three children: Mary, Harry W., Jr., and Sarah Elizabeth.

== Legacy ==
The Colmery-O'Neil Veterans Administration Hospital in Topeka, Kansas, is named in honor of him.

== Military awards ==

World War I Victory Medal

Non-profit organization positions
Preceded by Ray Murphy	National Commander of The American Legion; 1936 – 1937	Succeeded by Daniel J. Doherty
