= Lowell Cemetery (Lowell, Massachusetts) =

Historic cemetery in Massachusetts, United States

- U.S. National Register of Historic Places
- U.S. Historic district
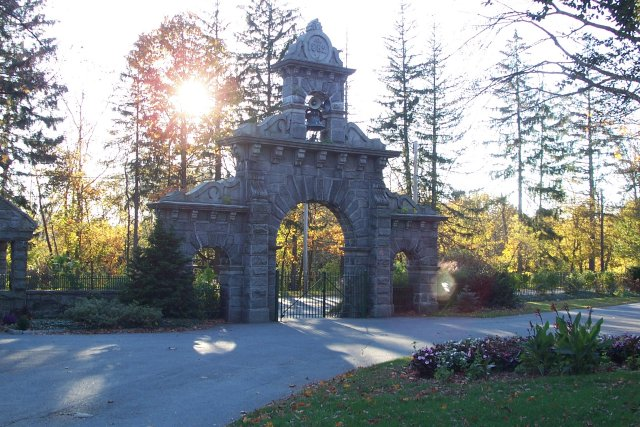
- Gate, Lawrence Street

- Location within Massachusetts Location within the United States
- Location: 77 Knapp Ave. Lowell, Massachusetts
- Nearest city: Lowell, Massachusetts
- Coordinates: 42°37′43″N 71°17′34″W
- Area: 73 acres (30 ha)
- Built: 1841
- NRHP reference No.: 98000543
- Added to NRHP: May 20, 1998

Lowell Cemetery is a cemetery located in Lowell, Massachusetts. Founded in 1841 and located on the banks of the Concord River, the cemetery is one of the oldest garden cemeteries in the nation, inspired by Mount Auburn Cemetery in Cambridge, Massachusetts. Many of Lowell's wealthy industrialists are buried here, under ornate Victorian tombstones. A 73-acre (30 ha) portion of the 84 acres (34 ha) cemetery was listed on the National Register of Historic Places in 1998.

== Description and history ==
The cemetery is located in the central eastern part of the city, roughly bounded on the north by Fort Hill Park, on the east by Shedd Park, on the south by railroad tracks, and on the west by the Concord River, from which it is separated by Lawrence Street, where its historic main gate is located. It occupies 84 acres of rolling terrain, much of which has been developed. The main gate is a monumental granite structure designed by C. W. Painter and built in 1862. There is a secondary gate on Knapp Avenue at the cemetery's northeast corner, which was added in 1905. There are two buildings in the cemetery: the Talbot Memorial Chapel (1885) and the Superintendent's Office (1887), both Gothic Revival structures designed by Boston architect Frederick Stickney.

Roadways in the cemetery were laid out to take advantage of the natural terrain, occasionally providing vistas. The main circulation route, Washington Avenue, roughly encircles the property, with several roads providing access across the central areas. The cemetery was laid out in 1841 to a design by George P. Worcester, a civil engineer, applying principles of the rural cemetery movement that was then just coming into vogue. The cemetery has a wide variety of funerary art in diverse styles, from typical Victorian forms to the Egyptian Revival and Art Deco. Many prominent Lowell residents of the 19th and 20th centuries are interred here.

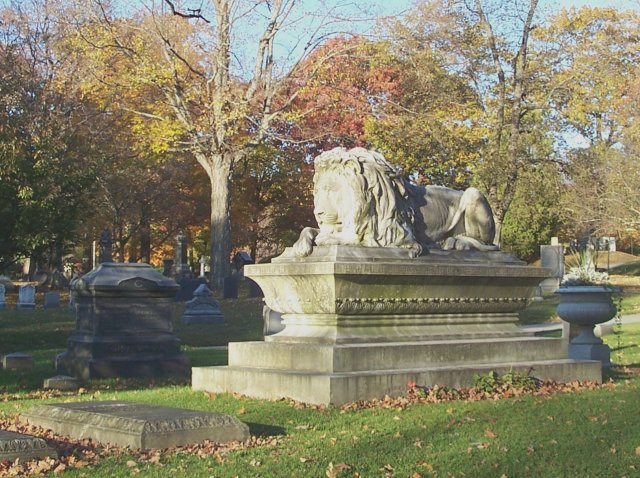
Ayer Lion, resting place of Dr. James Cook Ayer, patent medicine tycoon.

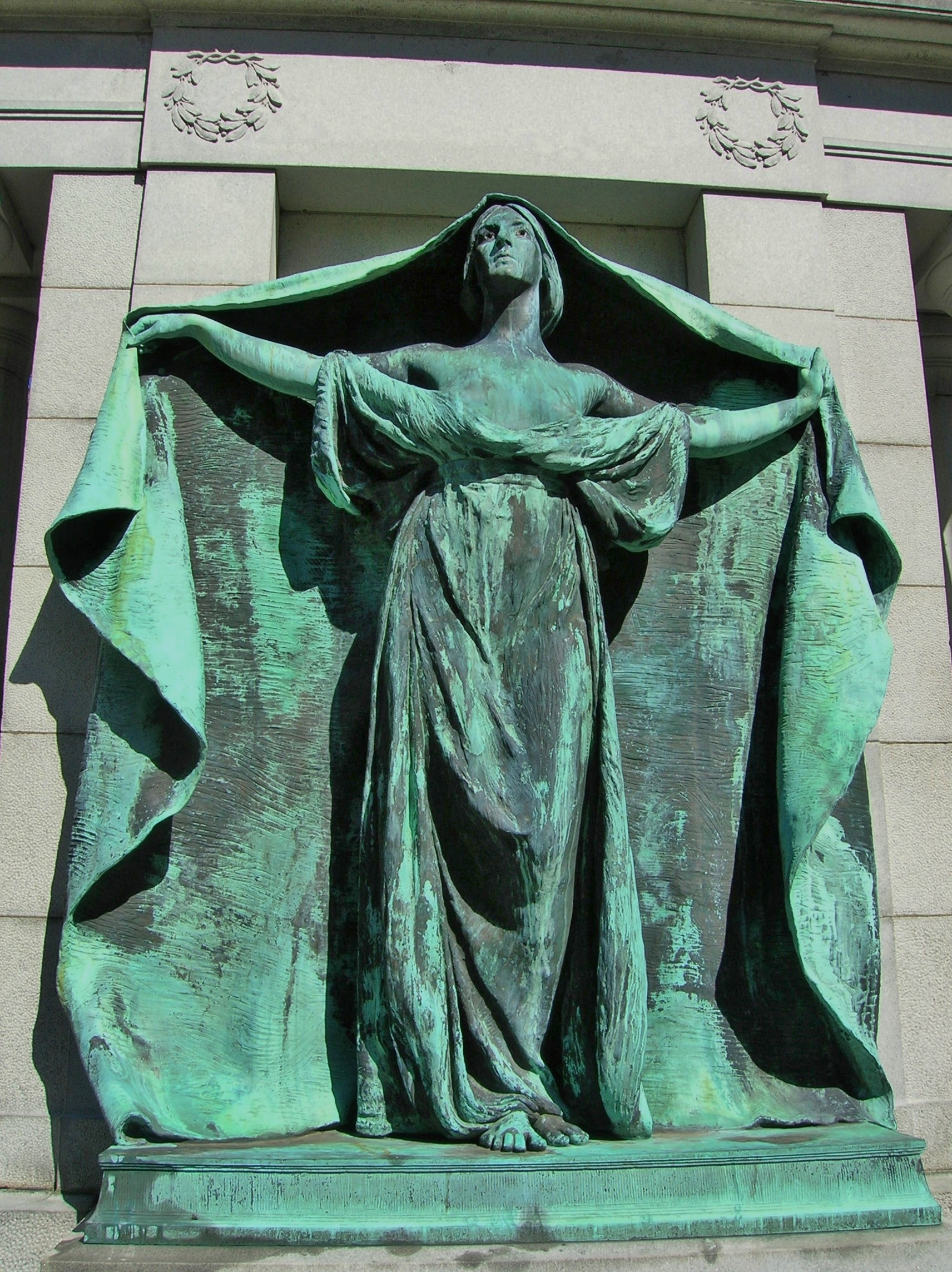
Bonney Memorial (1898), Francis Edwin Elwell, sculptor; Henry Bacon, architect.

== Notable burials ==
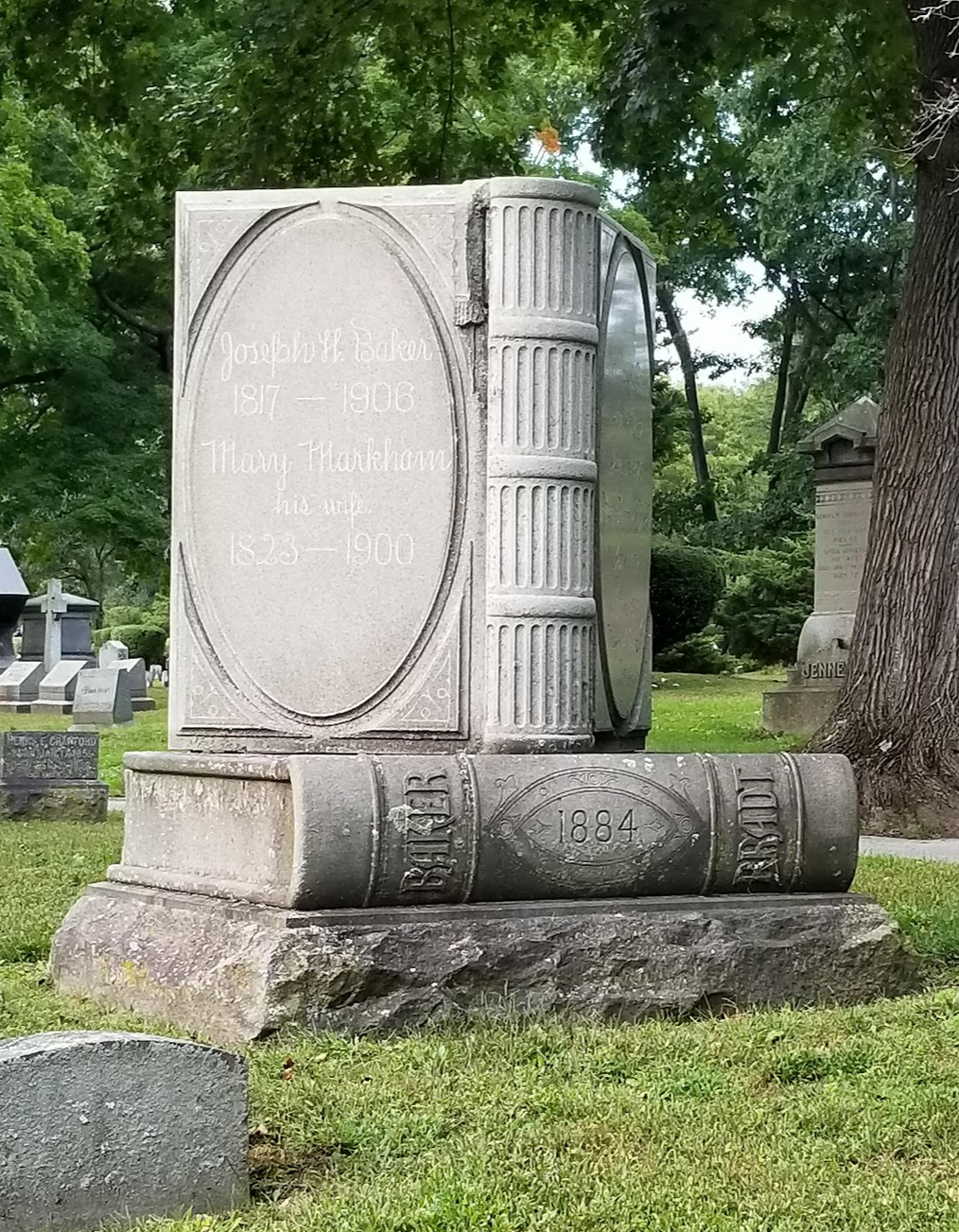
- Baker Bradt Memorial (1884) Resting place of Joseph Baker and his wife Mary Markham.
  Henry Livermore Abbott – Brevet Brigadier General in the Union Army during the American Civil War
- Charles Herbert Allen – Congressman; First US civilian governor of Puerto Rico
- Frederick Ayer – Industrialist; co-founder of the American Woolen Company
- James Cook Ayer – patent medicine tycoon
- Benjamin Dean – Congressman
- James B. Francis – chief engineer of Proprietors of Locks and Canals
- Frederic T. Greenhalge – Congressman and Governor of Massachusetts
- Chauncey Langdon Knapp – Congressman
- John Locke – Congressman
- John C. McFarland – Medal of Honor recipient
- John Jacob Rogers – Congressman
- Edith Nourse Rogers – Congressman
- Augustin Thompson – inventor of Moxie
- Paul Tsongas – United States Senator
- Tappan Wentworth – Congressman

== Gallery ==
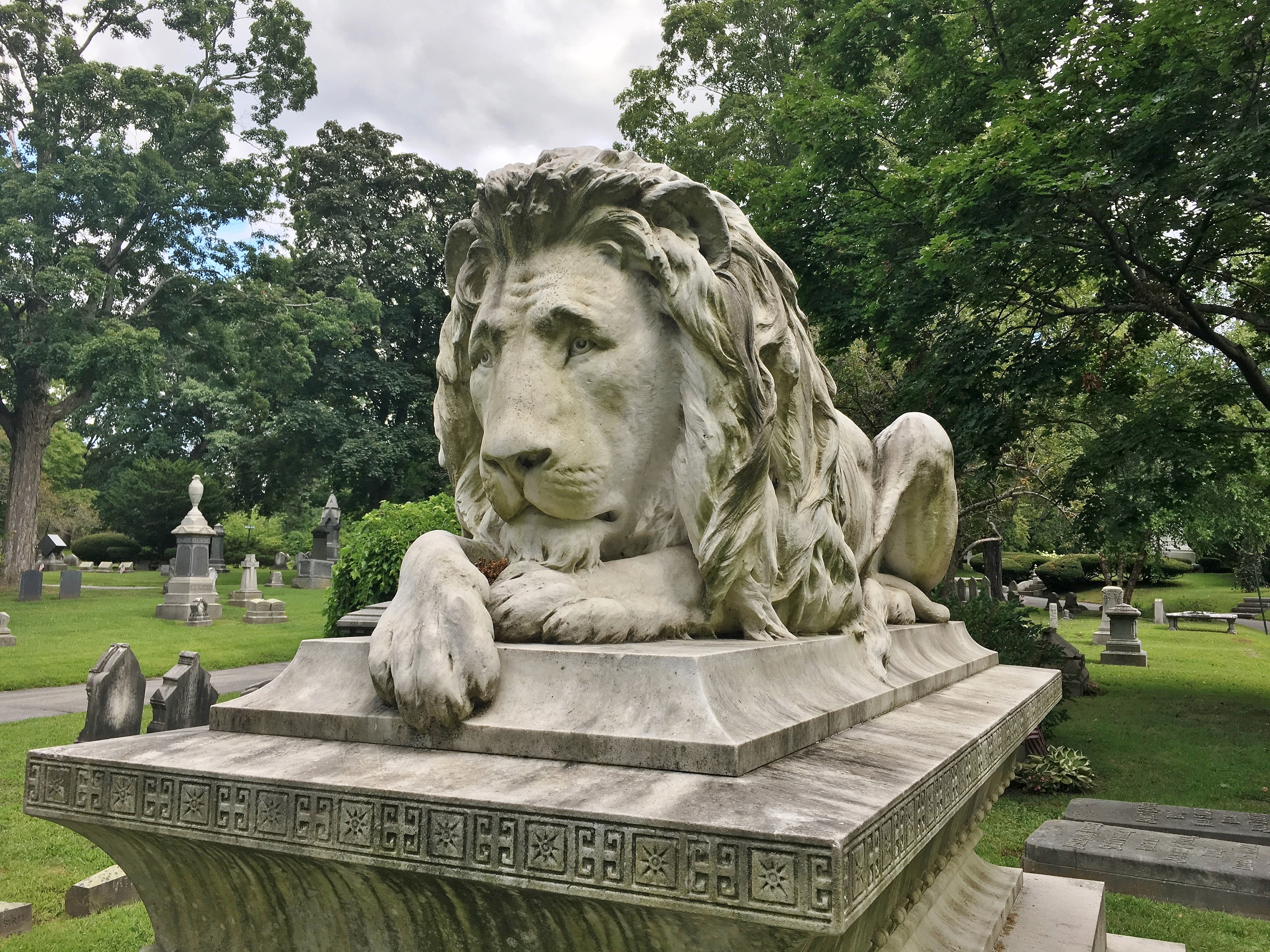
Ayer Lion Monument to James Cook Ayer (1880), Albert Bruce-Joy, sculptor.

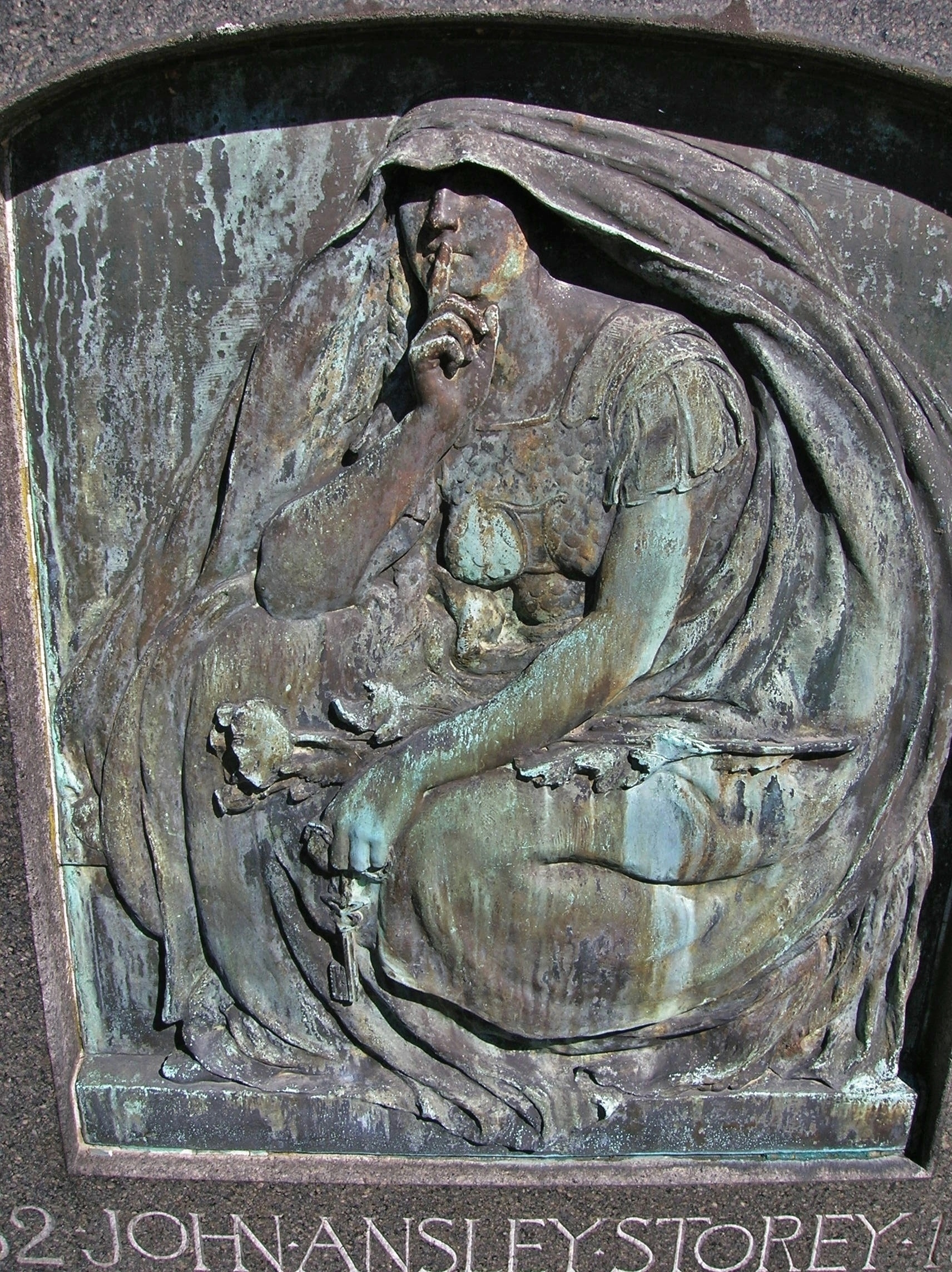
Storey Memorial (1905), Evelyn Beatrice Longman, sculptor.

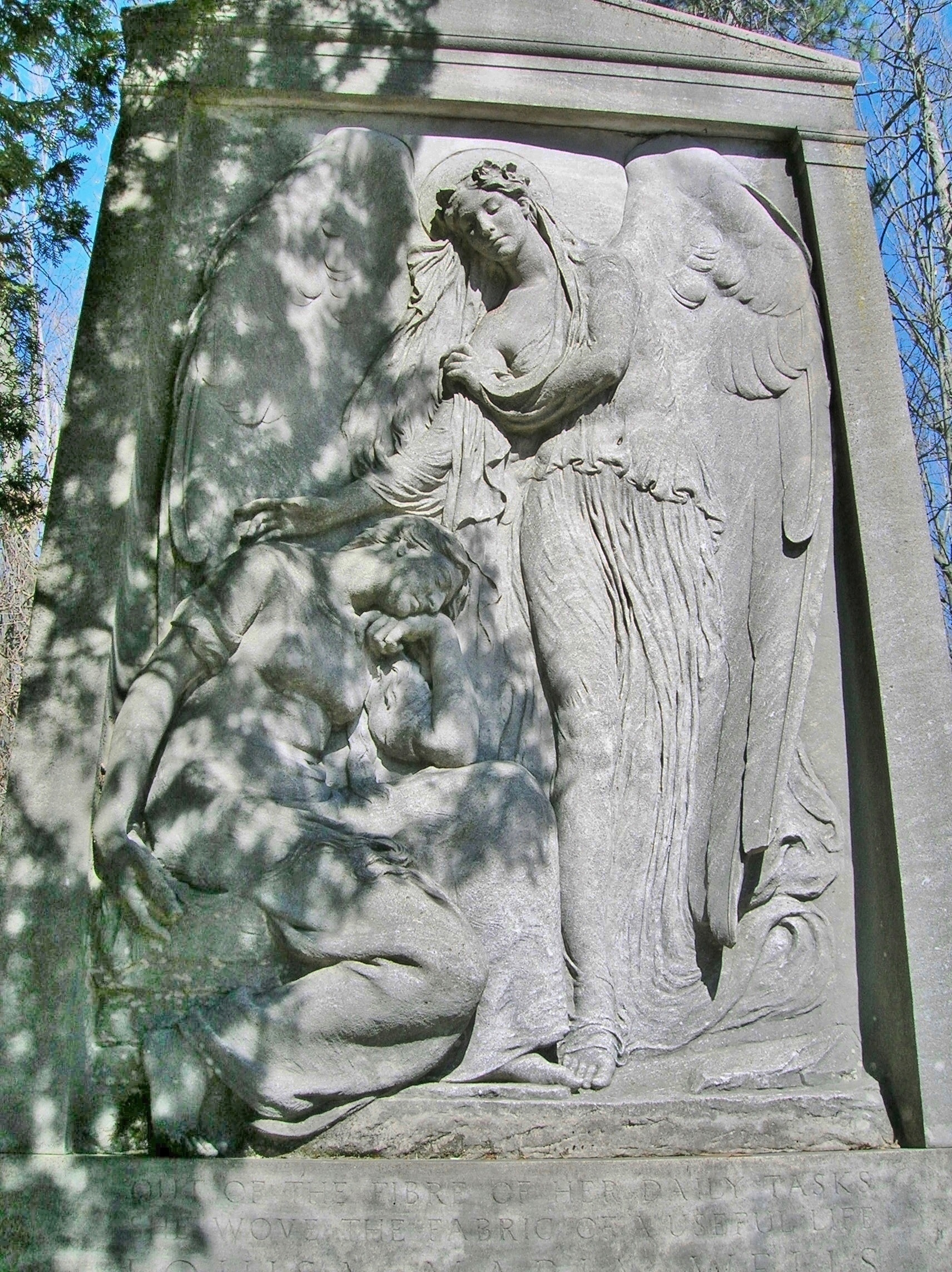
Mill Girl Monument to Louisa Maria Wells (1906), Evelyn Beatrice Longman, sculptor.

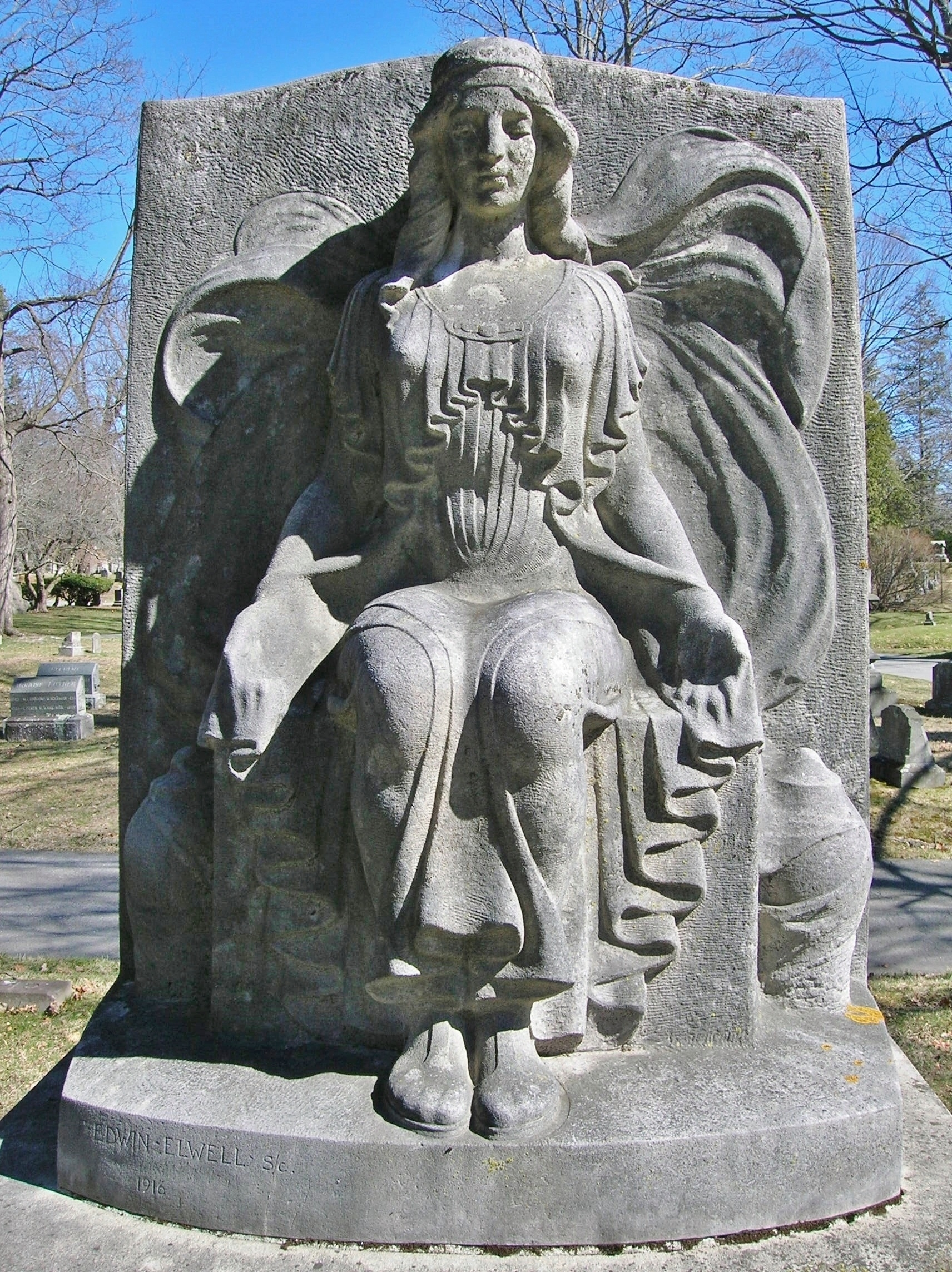
Seated Woman Monument (1916), Francis Edwin Elwell, sculptor.

== See also ==
- National Register of Historic Places listings in Lowell, Massachusetts
