= James Cook Ayer =

American patent medicine businessman (1818–1878)

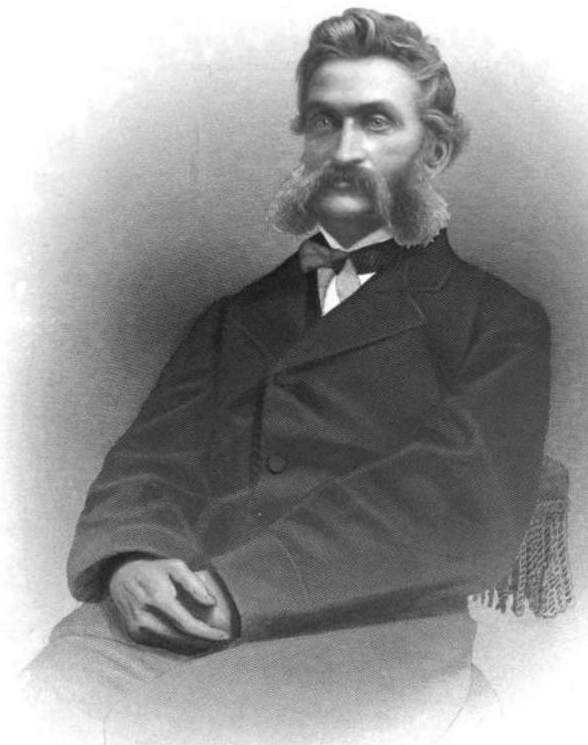
- Born: May 5, 1818; Groton, Connecticut
- Died: July 3, 1878 (aged 60); Winchendon, Massachusetts
- Burial place: Lowell Cemetery
- Occupation: Businessman
- Spouse: Josephine Mellen Southwick (m. 1850)
- Children: 3
- Relatives: Frederick Ayer (brother)

Signature
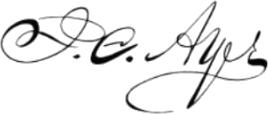

James Cook Ayer (May 5, 1818 – July 3, 1878) was the wealthiest patent medicine businessman of his day.

== Early life ==
James Cook Ayer was born in Groton, Connecticut, on May 5, 1818, the son of Frederick Ayer (1792-1825) and Persis Herrick Cook (1786-1880). After his mother remarried, James Ayer and his brother Frederick Ayer moved to Lowell, Massachusetts, and lived with his uncle, James Cook.

He attended Lowell High School in 1838, after which he was apprenticed to James C. Robbins, a druggist in Lowell. While there he studied medicine, and later he graduated from the medical school of the University of Pennsylvania.

== Career ==
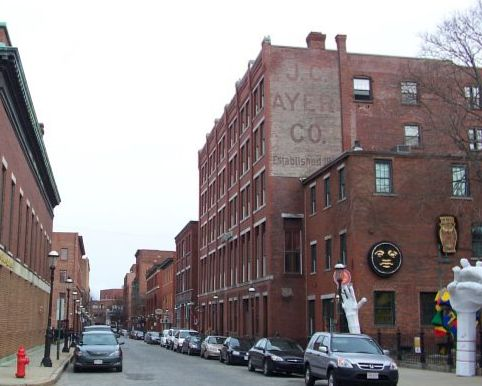
Dr Ayer's laboratory on right, in Lowell

Ayer never practiced medicine, but devoted his principal attention to pharmaceutical chemistry and the compounding of medicines. His success in this line was very great, and soon led him to establish a factory in Lowell for the manufacture of his medicinal preparations, which became one of the largest of its kind in the world, and was magnificently equipped. He accumulated a fortune estimated at $20,000,000.

Much of his success was due to his advertising, on which he spent $140,000 a year, and he annually published an almanac, distributing 5,000,000 copies each year. Editions in English, French, German, Portuguese, and Spanish, were regularly issued. In 1874 he accepted the Republican nomination for the United States Congress in the 7th Massachusetts District, but was defeated.

In addition to his patent medicine business, Dr. Ayer was involved in textile production in Lowell, Massachusetts, with his brother.

== Personal life ==
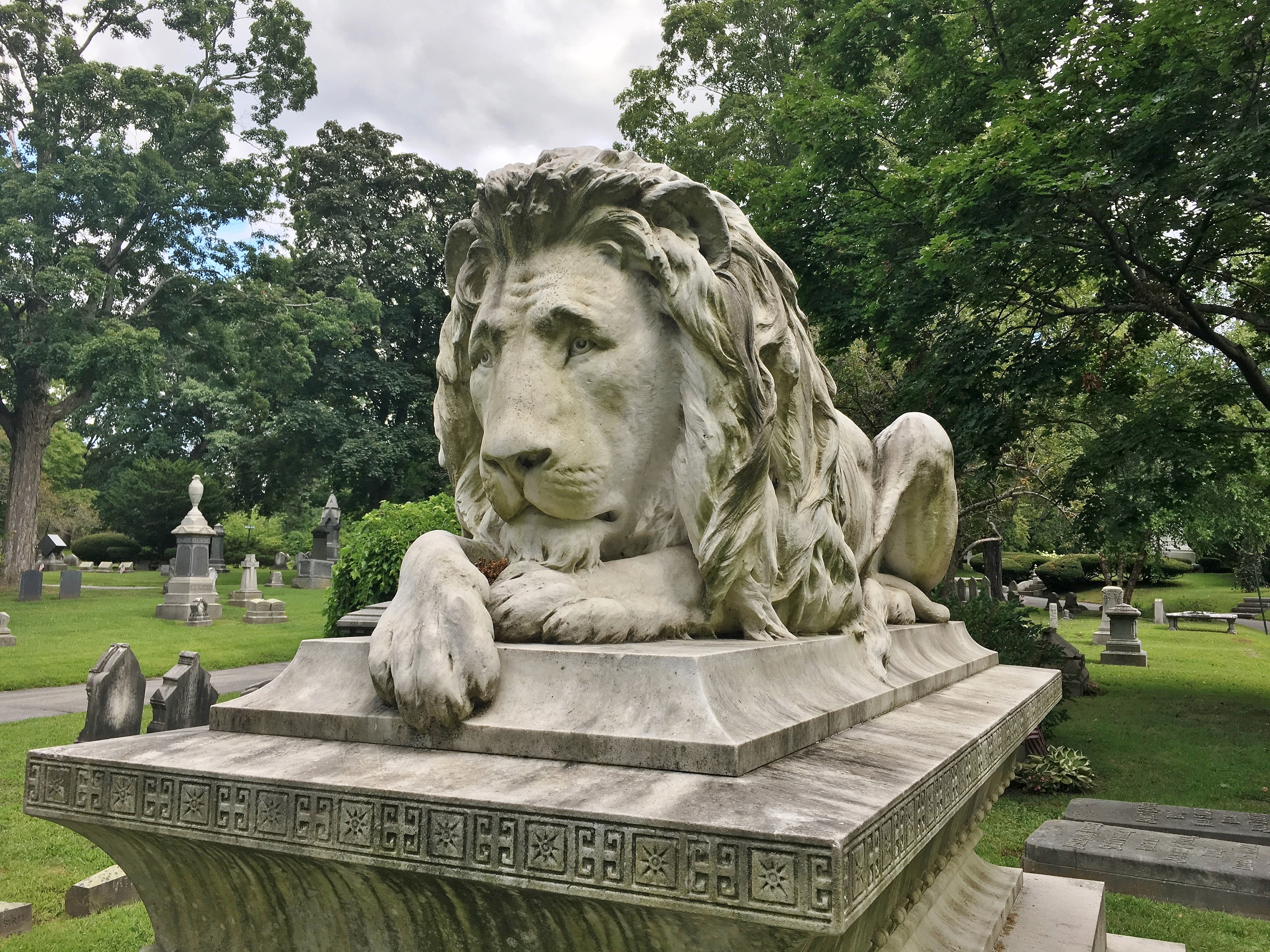
Ayer Lion, resting place of Dr. J.C. Ayer, patent medicine tycoon, Lowell Cemetery, Lowell, Massachusetts

In 1850, Ayer married Josephine Mellen Southwick (1827–1898). They had three children:

- Frederick Fanning Ayer (1851–1924)
- Henry Southwick Ayer (1853–1932)
- Lesley Josephine Ayer Pearson (1855–1928)

His son, Frederick Fanning Ayer became a lawyer and philanthropist, and was director or stockholder of many corporations.

He died in an insane asylum on July 3, 1878, and is interred at Lowell Cemetery.

=== Legacy ===
The monument at Ayer's gravesite, a life-size marble lion sculpted by Albert Bruce-Joy, is one of the best known at Lowell Cemetery.

The town of Ayer, Mass., was named after him.

== Gallery ==
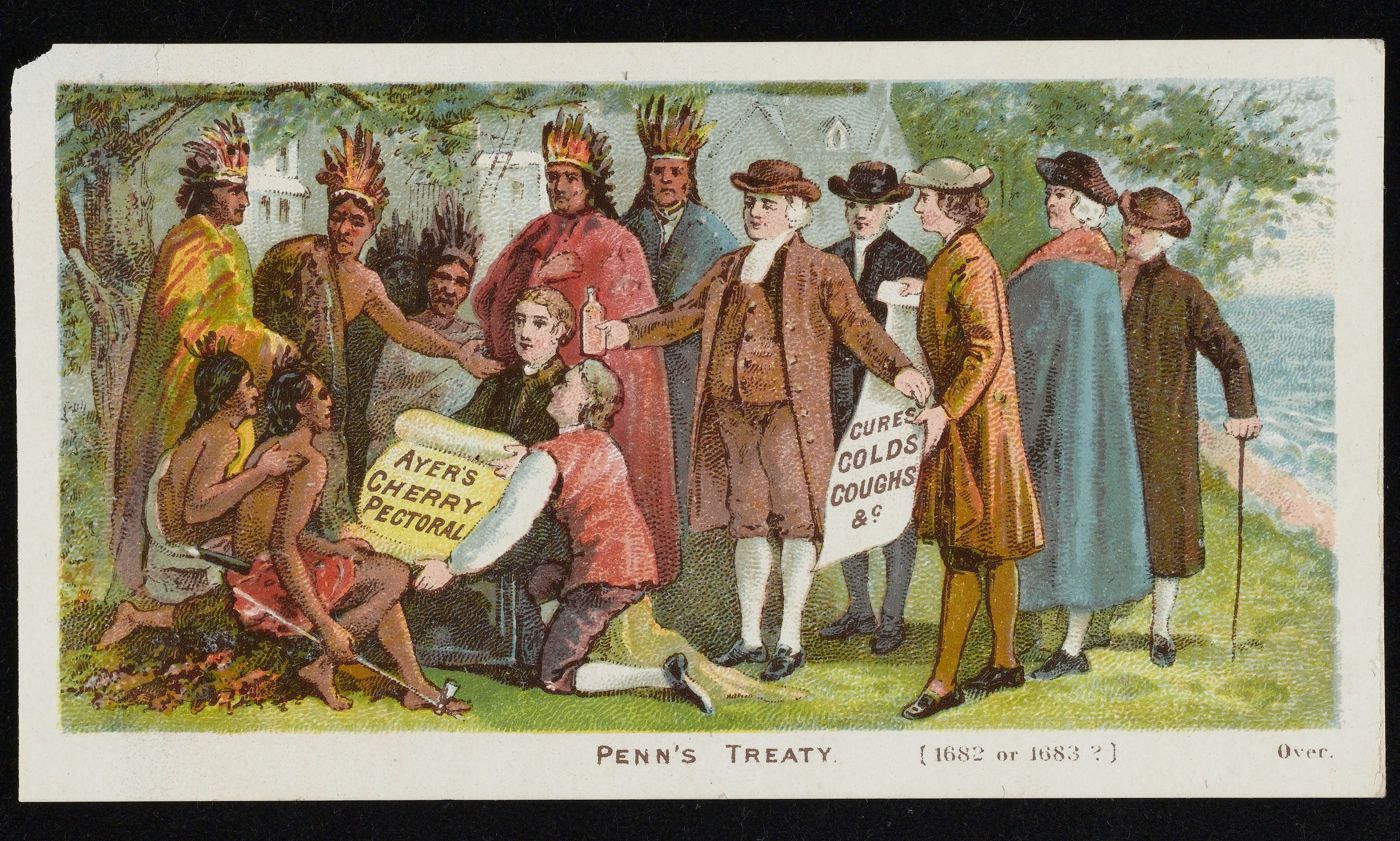
Advert for Ayers Cherry Pectoral

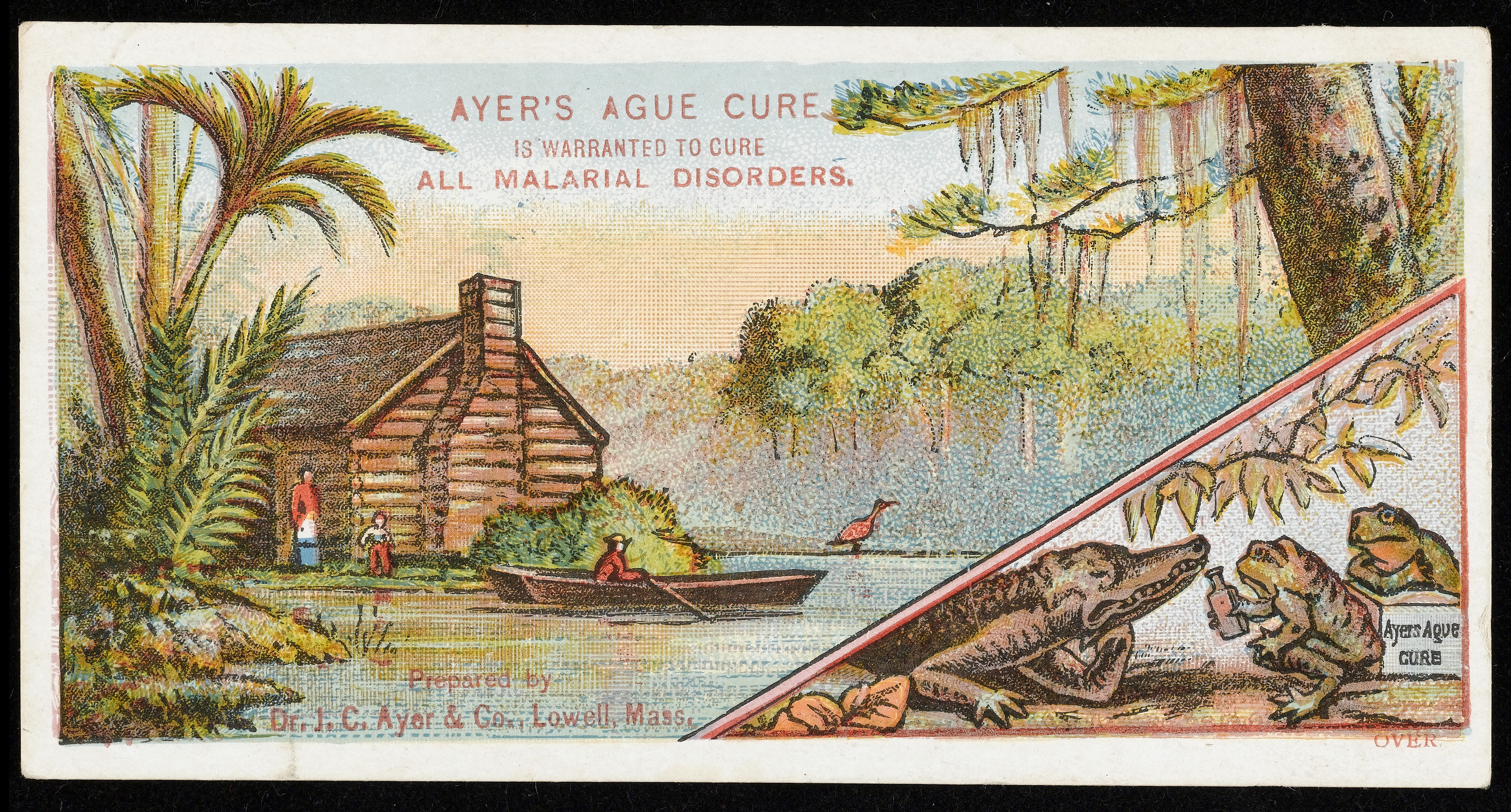
Advert for Ayers Ague Cure

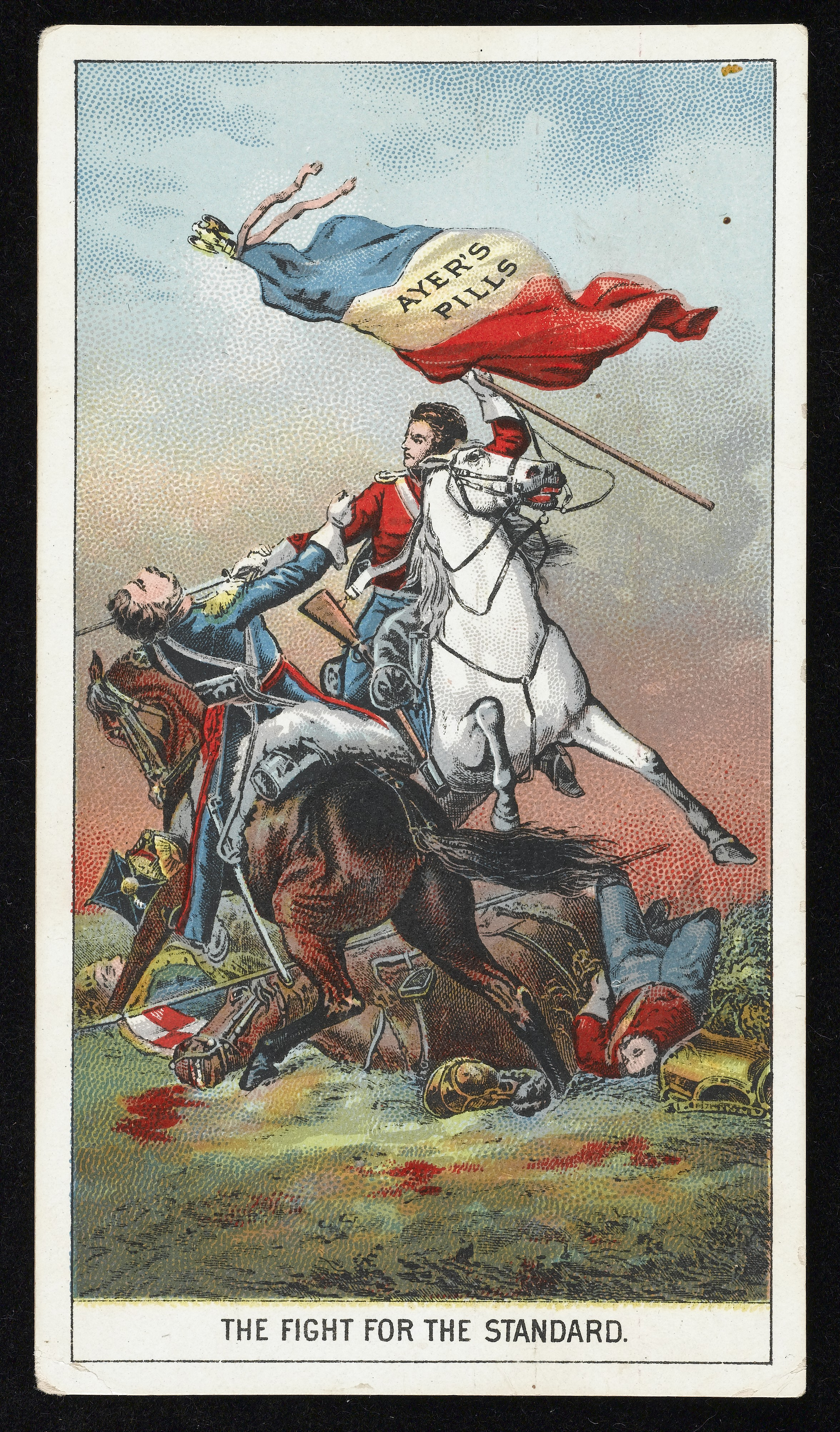
Advert for Ayers Pills

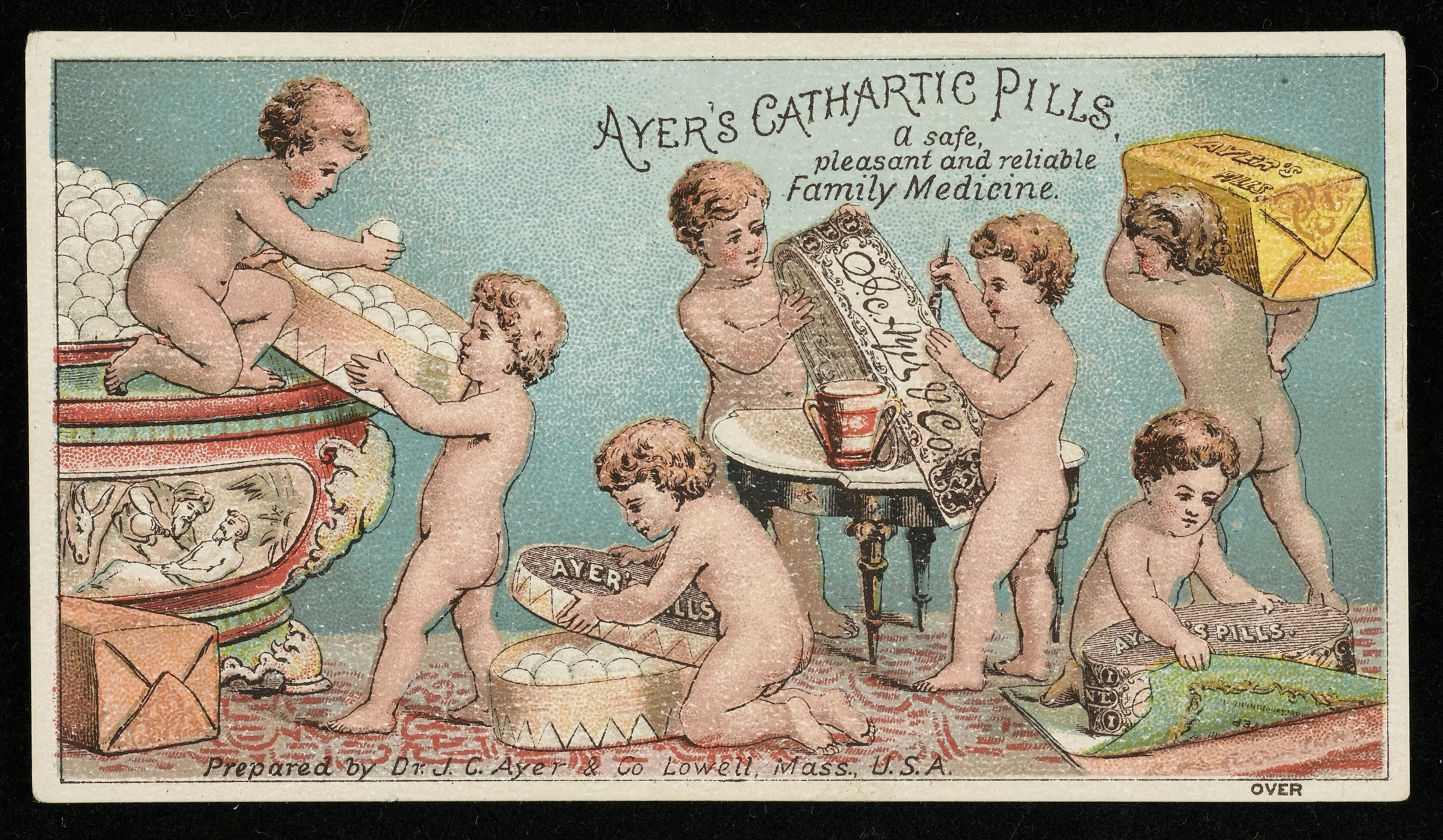
Advert for Ayers Cathartic Pills

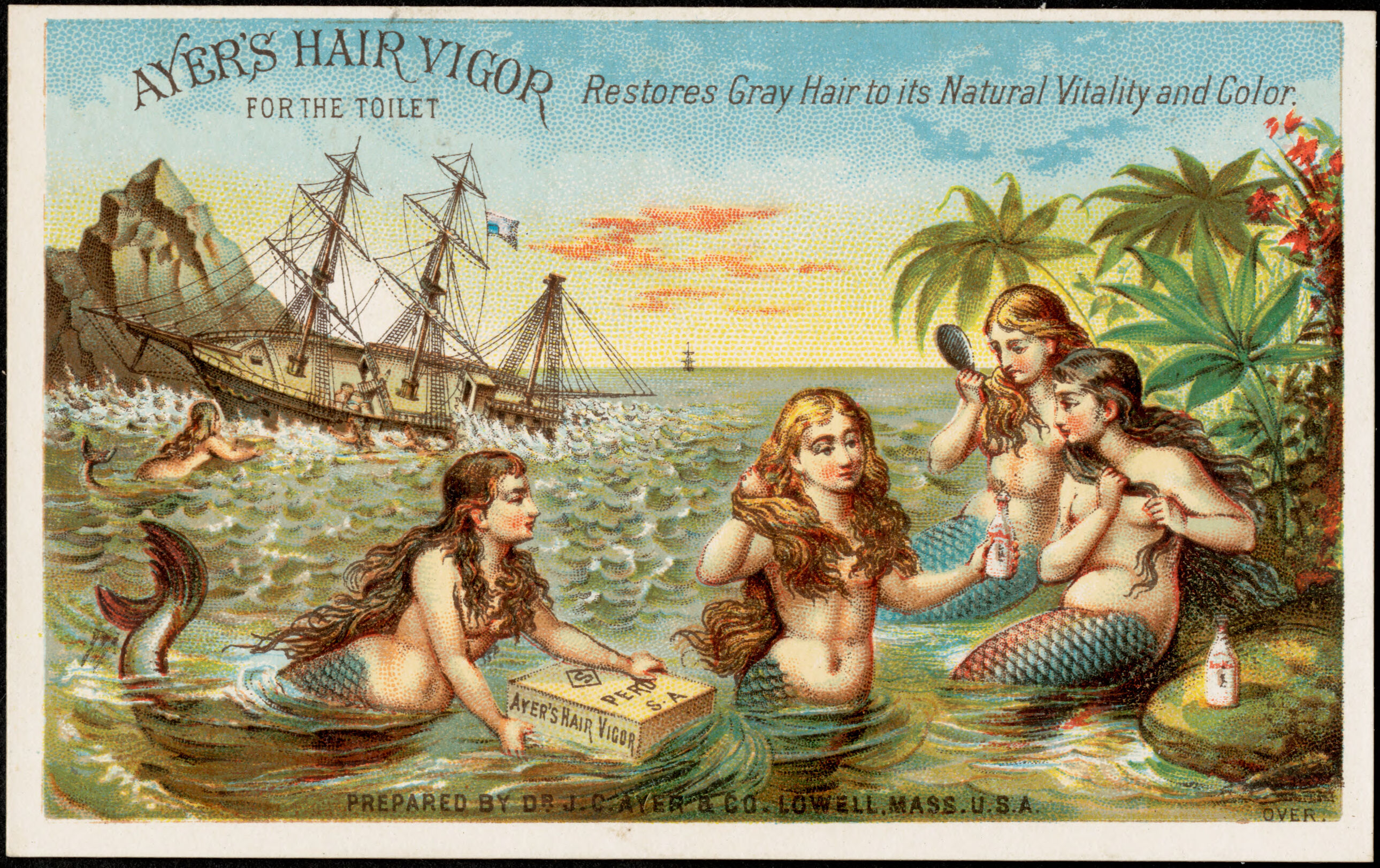
Ayer's Hair Vigor for the toilet restores gray hair to its natural vitality and color, [ca. 1870-1900]. 19th Century American Trade Cards Collection, Boston Public Library

== See also ==
- Frederick Ayer Mansion
