= Shedd Park =

Shedd Park may refer to:

- Shedd Park (Chicago), location of Shedd Park Fieldhouse
- Shedd Park (Lowell, Massachusetts)

== See also ==
- Shedd Aquarium, Chicago, not located in Shedd Park
