= Shedd Park (Lowell, Massachusetts) =

Park in Lowell, Massachusetts

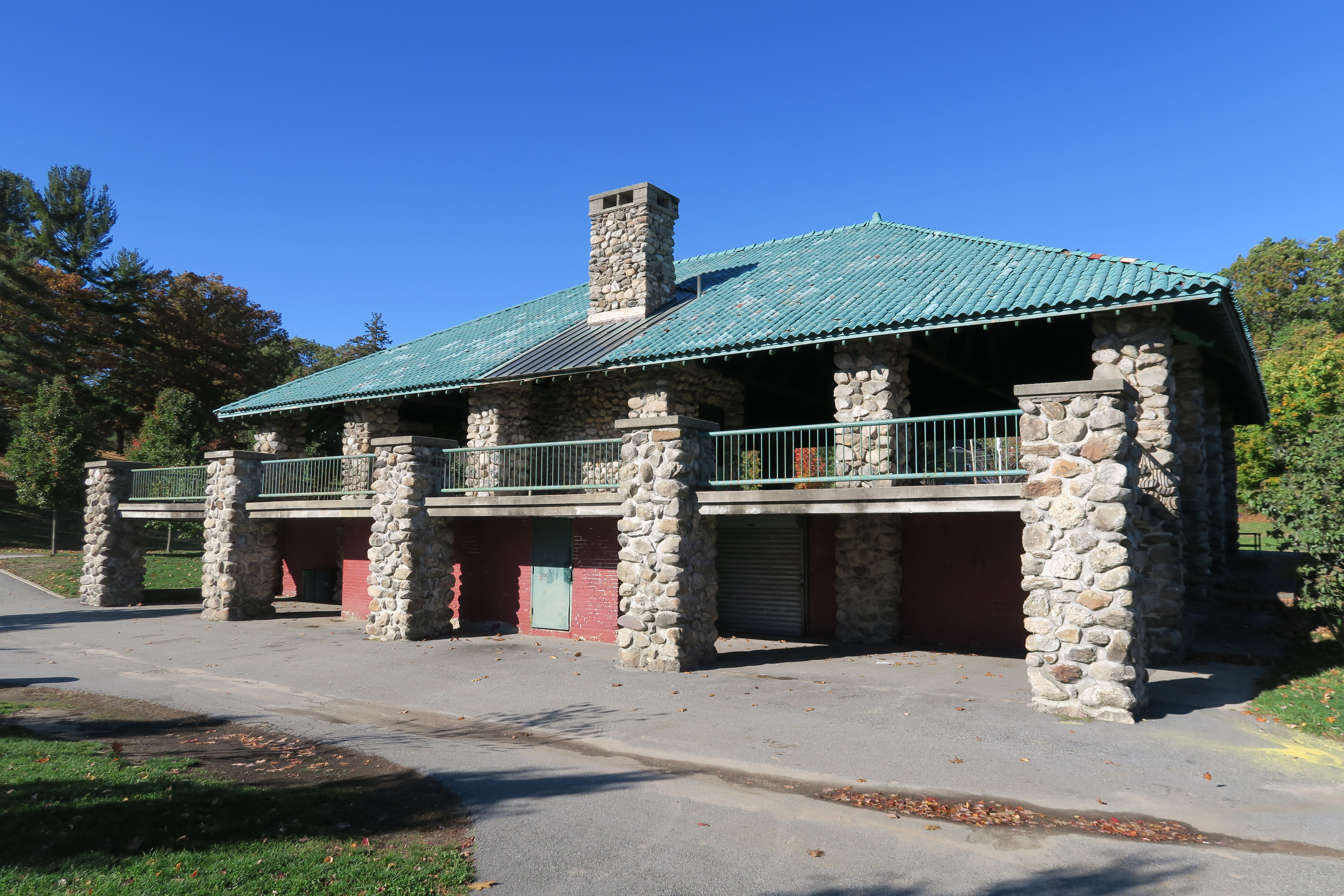
- Shedd Park's pavilion in 2016
- Interactive map of Shedd Park
- Location: 453 Rogers St. Lowell, Massachusetts, U.S.
- Coordinates: 42°37′55.8″N 71°17′19.9″W
- Area: 50 acres (20 ha)
- Created: 1910

Shedd Park is a 50-acre (20 ha) public park in Lowell, Massachusetts. It is located off Rogers Street (Route 38) and flanked by Boylston Street and Knapp Avenue in the Belvidere section of the city. It includes multiple baseball fields, tennis/basketball courts, a pavilion, and a water park. In combination with Fort Hill and the Lowell Cemetery, Shedd Park is one of the largest urban green spaces in the Greater Lowell area.

The park was made possible in part through the contribution of $100,000 from the estate of Freeman B. Shedd. His wife, Amy, died in 1924 and his daughter had died in 1921 without having any children. This money allowed the city to develop the park which he had donated in 1910. The Shedd Park Field House was built in 1927 and on October 29, 2016 it was dedicated and renamed the John D. Lord Pavilion.

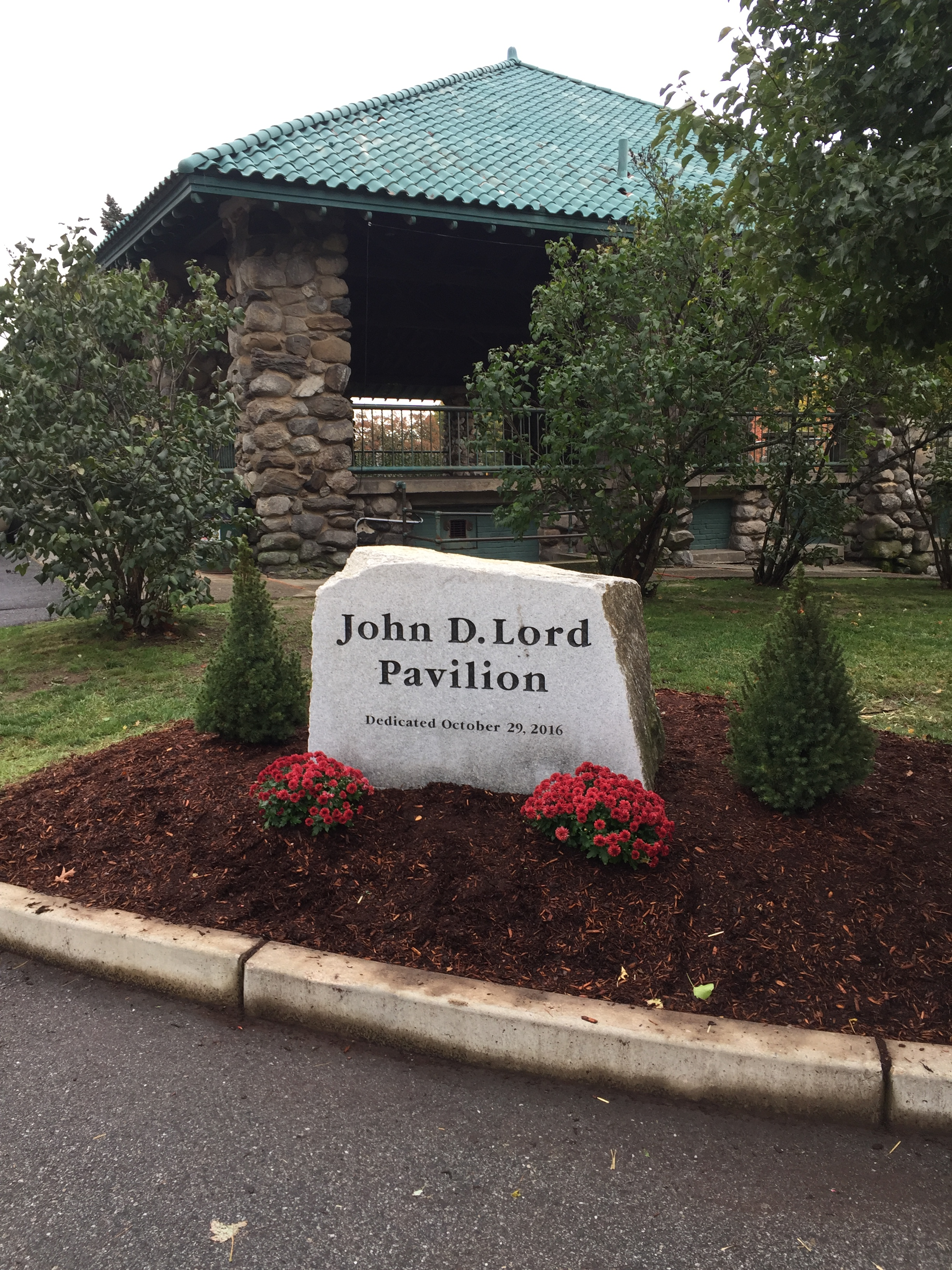
John Lord Pavilion

== See also ==
- Rogers Fort Hill Park Historic District
- Belvidere Hill Historic District
