= Rogers Fort Hill Park Historic District =

Historic district in Massachusetts, United States

- U.S. National Register of Historic Places
- U.S. Historic district
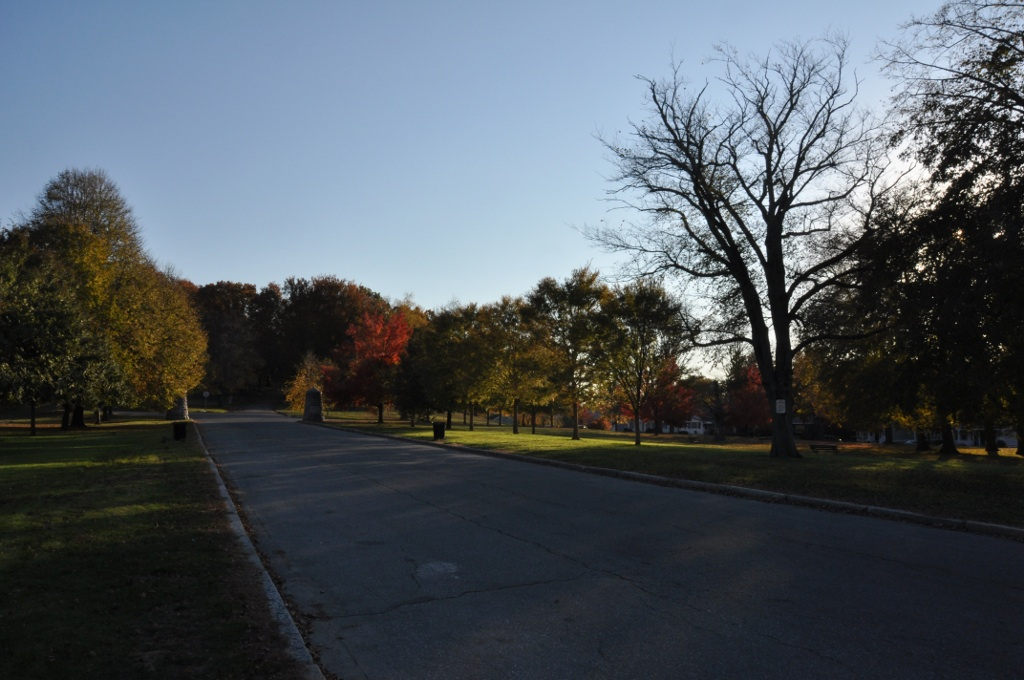

- Location within Massachusetts Location within the United States
- Location: Lowell, Massachusetts
- Coordinates: 42°38′6″N 71°17′47″W
- Built: 1837
- Architect: Stickney, Frederick W.; Bowditch, Ernst, et al.
- Architectural style: Greek Revival, Queen Anne
- NRHP reference No.: 99000635
- Added to NRHP: May 27, 1999

The Rogers Fort Hill Park Historic District of Lowell, Massachusetts, encompasses the largest single residential development made in the city in the 19th century. The district includes the area historically associated with the Rogers Farm, purchased in 1805 by Zadock Rogers. His daughters sold off most of the property in two parcels in the 1880s: land to the south of their homestead was sold to the city, and most of it was developed into Fort Hill Park, while that north of the homestead was sold to developers. The district is roughly bounded by High Street, Mansur Street, Concord Road, and Lowell Cemetery.

The district was added to the National Register of Historic Places in 1999.

== See also ==
- National Register of Historic Places listings in Lowell, Massachusetts
