= Augustin Thompson =

19th Century American Doctor, and Creator of Moxie

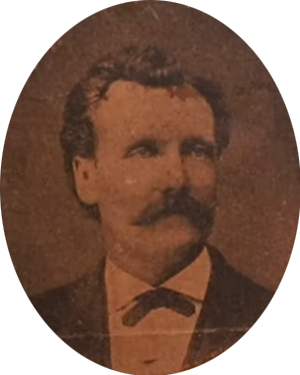
- Thompson in 1880
- Born: November 25, 1835; Union, Knox County, Maine, U.S.
- Died: June 8, 1903 (aged 67); Boston, Suffolk County, Massachusetts, U.S.
- Occupation: Physician
- Known for: Inventor of Moxie
- Spouse: Sarah Stewart Thompson

Augustin Thompson (November 25, 1835 – June 8, 1903) was an American physician, businessman, and philanthropist who created the Moxie soft drink and the company that manufactured it (now part of the Coca-Cola Company).

== Early life and Civil War service ==
Thompson was born in Union, Maine on November 25, 1835.

On October 1, 1862 he enlisted in the Union Army and, nine days later, was commissioned as captain of Company G, 28th Maine Volunteer Infantry. He saw action in the Siege of Port Hudson in Donaldsonville, Louisiana as well as minor action at Fort Pickens in Pensacola, Florida. He was wounded in action and developed tuberculosis which led to his discharge on August 31, 1863.

On October 27, 1864, Thompson rejoined the Union Army as commander of the 7th Company Unassigned Maine Infantry Volunteers. The company was organized at Augusta and served from November 2, 1864 at Fort Popham in Phippsburg, Maine guarding the approaches to the key shipbuilding city of Bath. After the defeat of the Confederacy, Thompson was, along with his company, mustered out of service on July 6, 1865. Later he was granted, through an act of Congress, brevet (i.e. honorary) promotions to major and lieutenant colonel in recognition of his distinguished service during the Civil War.

== Post war ==
After the war ended, he went on to attend Hahnemann Homeopathia College and graduated with honors at the head of his class.

Upon graduation he settled in Lowell, Massachusetts where he set up his medical practice in 1867. By 1885, Dr. Thompson's practice had become highly successful and he was said to have one of the largest patient lists in New England.

== Moxie ==
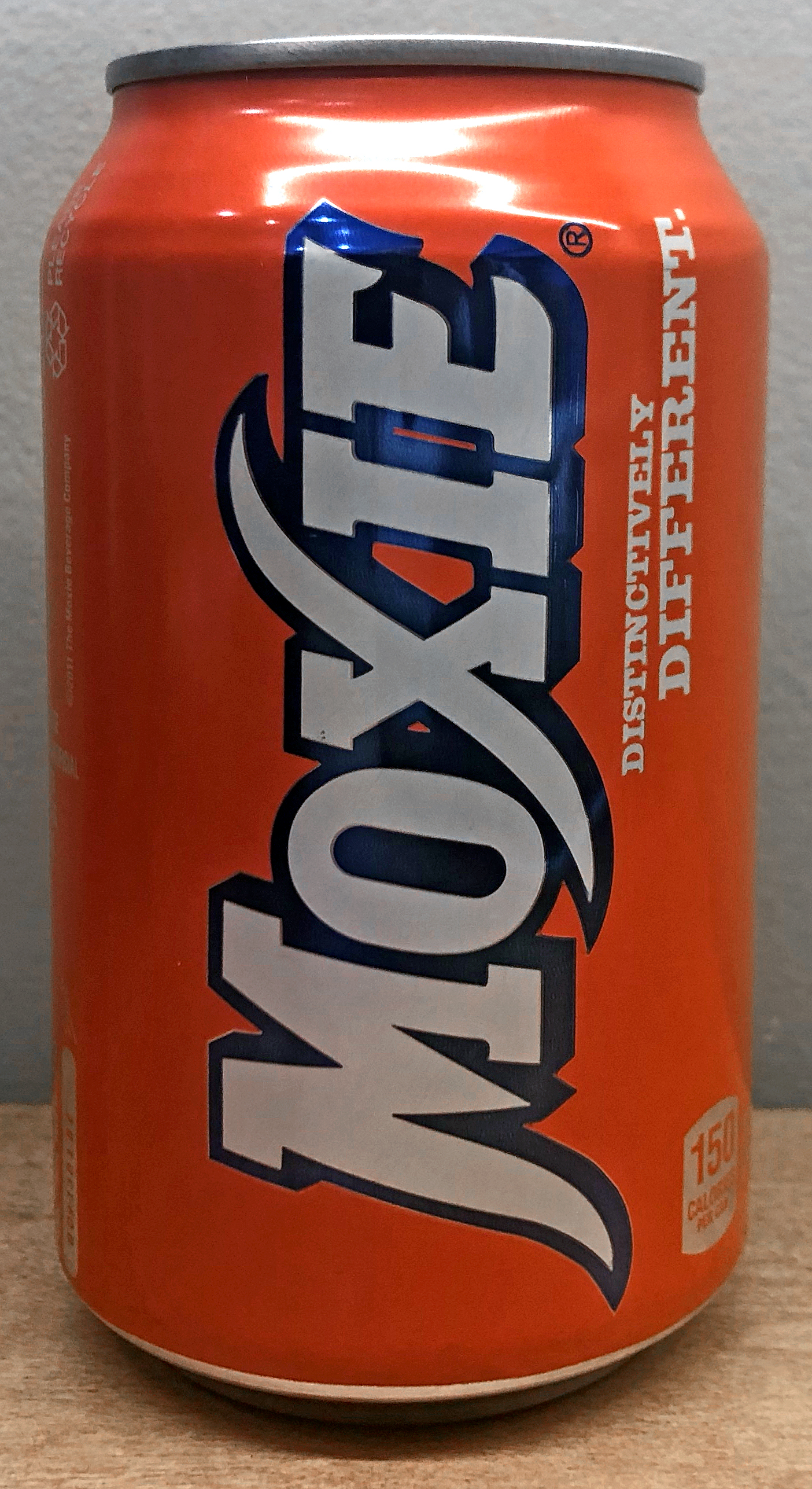
Moxie can.

That same year, Thompson invested his $15,000 (over $350,000 by 2009 standards) to begin the marketing and sale of his Moxie nerve tonic.

The tonic, based upon his original patent medicine "Nerve Food" created in 1876, was first released as a syrup in 1884. Aside from profit motive, it was Thompson's intent to produce a medicine which did not contain harmful substances such as cocaine or alcohol. In 1885, he received a trade mark for the term "Moxie" and released it as a carbonated beverage.

Moxie proved to be a commercial success but, about 1889, Thompson decided to resume his medical practice. He entered into an agreement with William Taylor, a Moxie agent in upstate New York, whereby Taylor became the Moxie lessee in Massachusetts and established The Moxie Nerve Food Company with Thompson as general manager with a salary of $5,000 per year. This annual income was sufficient to provide Thompson with the financial independence needed to pursue his other interests.

== Later life ==
Thompson spent the rest of his life as a playwright, developing marketing campaigns for Moxie, as well as writing letters to newspaper editors reflecting his diverse interests including geography, economics, legal issues, and politics. He was an advocate for the Free Silver movement, which was the major issue in the presidential campaign of 1896.

Thompson supported the Spanish–American War, and saw the importance of the United States expanding its sphere of influence to include the annexation of the Philippines and other territories.

In 1902, Thompson sought a copyright for his book, The Origin and Continuance of Life: Together with the Development of a System of Medical Administration on the Law of the Similars, from a Discovery of its Principles in the Law of Natural Affinities. The book contained an illustration of his latest invention, the Thompson Vitalizer, which was a device consisting of tanks of compressed gases, tubes, and other components. Thompson desired to establish a number of parlors, along the east coast to allow the public to benefit from his invention.

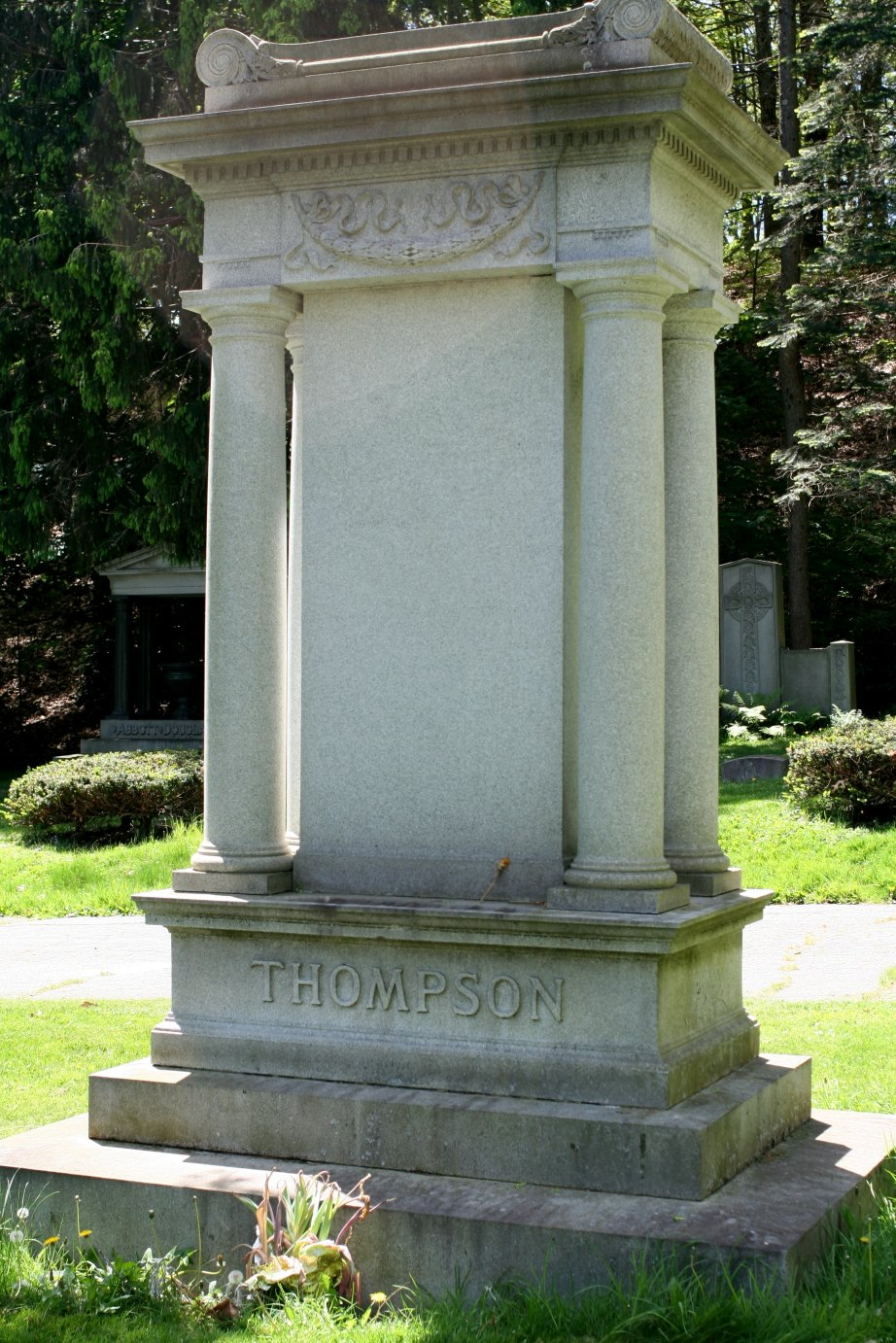
Gravestone of Dr. Thompson in Lowell Cemetery

Thompson died in 1903. He is buried at the Lowell Cemetery in Lowell, Massachusetts.
