= Frederick Ayer Mansion =

Historic house in Boston, Massachusetts

Coordinates: 42°20′57.59″N 71°05′25.23″W

- U.S. National Register of Historic Places
- U.S. National Historic Landmark
- U.S. Historic district – Contributing property
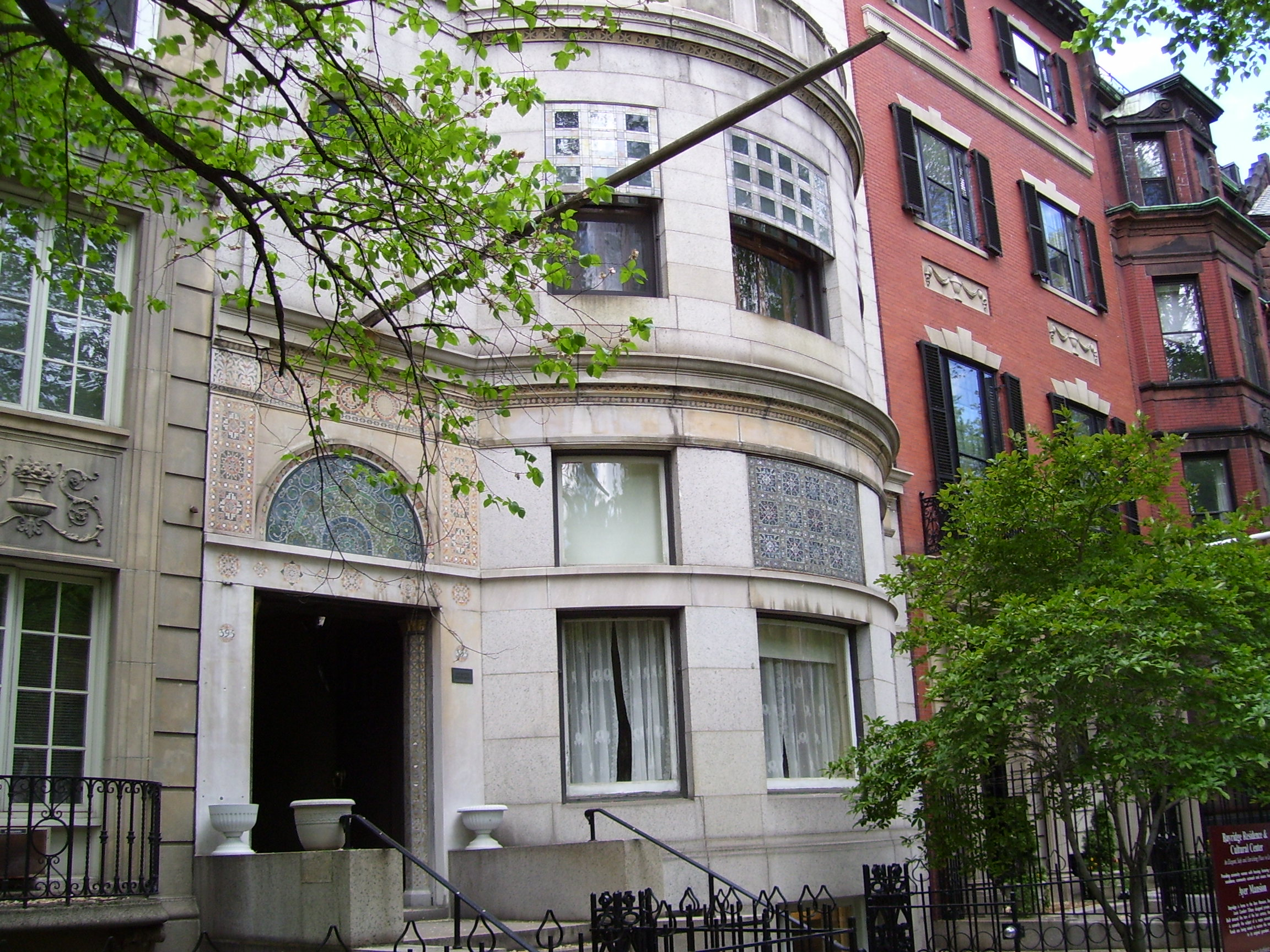

- Location within Boston Location within Massachusetts Location within the United States
- Location: Boston, Massachusetts
- Part of: Back Bay Historic District (ID73001948)
- NRHP reference No.: 05000459

Significant dates
- Added to NRHP: April 5, 2005
- Designated NHL: April 5, 2005
- Designated CP: August 14, 1973

The Frederick Ayer Mansion is a National Historic Landmark on 395 Commonwealth Avenue in the Back Bay neighborhood of Boston, Massachusetts.

The mansion was the home of Frederick Ayer, owner of the American Woolen Company, and features well preserved design work by Louis Comfort Tiffany. The house was added to the National Register of Historic Places in 2005.

== Historical significance ==
The Ayer Mansion was built in 1900, designed by Louis Comfort Tiffany in a partnership with Alfred J. Manning. It is one of three surviving examples of Tiffany designed interiors. The other two sites are the Samuel L. Clemens (Mark Twain House) in Hartford, Connecticut (1881), and the Ferry House in Seattle, Washington (1903–1906). What makes the Ayer Mansion so unusual is that Tiffany also designed exterior mosaics for the property. The only other building known to have included this feature by Tiffany was his private residence, Laurelton Hall, which was destroyed in a fire in the 1950s. Individual components from Laurelton Hall survive in museums, but the Ayer Mansion is now the only place that has intact in situ interior and exterior components designed by Tiffany.

The mansion was sold by the family after Frederick's death in 1918 and converted to office space. The Trimount Foundation and Bayridge Residence and Cultural Center, affiliates of the Roman Catholic Opus Dei organization, purchased the Ayer mansion and adjacent buildings in 1964. They are currently operated as private residential facilities for area college students, although tours are occasionally given of the public spaces where Tiffany-designed elements have been preserved.

== Preservation ==
Since its purchase by the Trimount and Bayridge Residence and Cultural Center, several renovations have been done to the buildings. The first renovation occurred in 1971–72 when the two buildings were joined. In 1999, Jean Carroon Architects conducted an assessment of the building's preservation needs as well as a detailed proposal on how to achieve it. The first of the projects outlined was the restoration of a 24-foot lay light which had been concealed for fifty years. Also renovated was the front living room in 2000. The drop ceiling installed when the building was converted into offices was removed to reveal the original floral-patterned ceiling, and the parquet floor was also restored. The mosaic on the interior hall was restored in 2002.

Currently, efforts are being made to restore the exterior of the building. The project will include repairing 4 out of the 7 mosaics on the exterior balcony which have been damaged or lost due to water infiltration; recreation of the two missing stained-glass screens on the first floor; restoration of the remaining window on the first floor; and recreation of the missing stained-glass screen along the top floor.

== Gallery ==
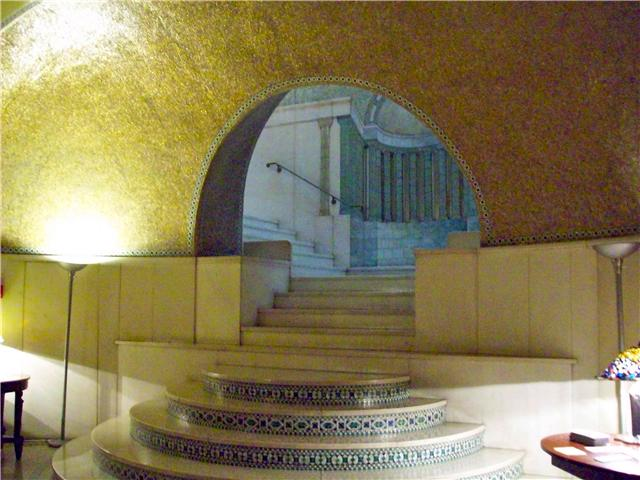
The mansion's central stairway

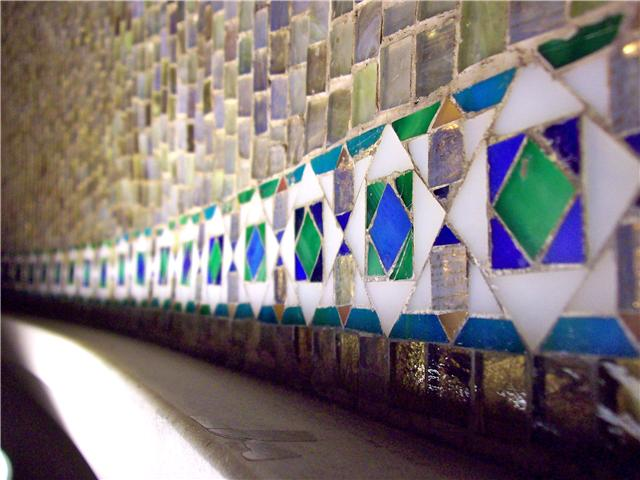
Detail of mosaic design in the central hall

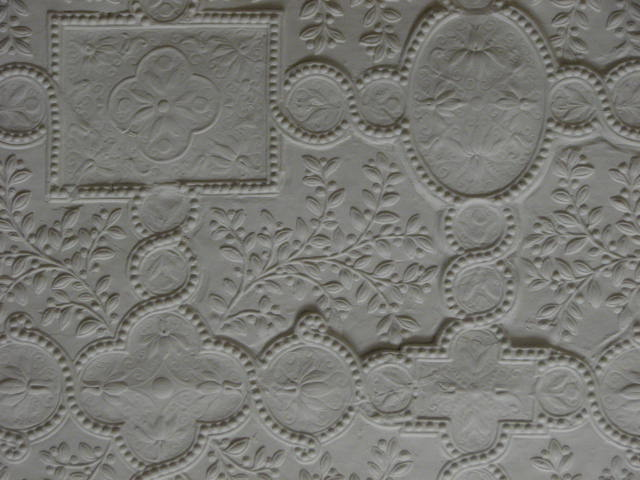
Detail of the original ceiling in the living room

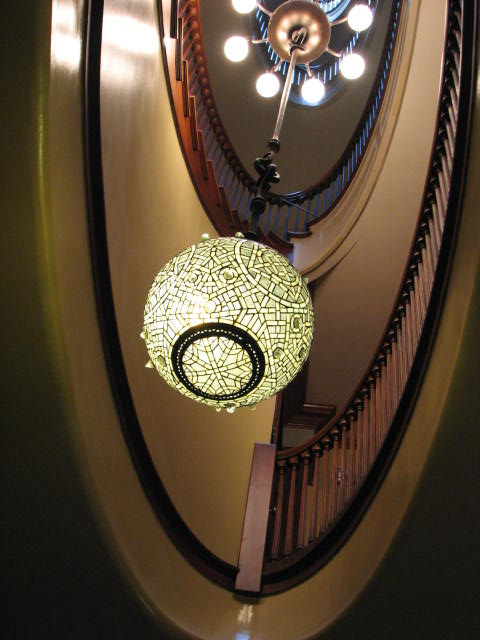
Center stair and original light designed by Tiffany

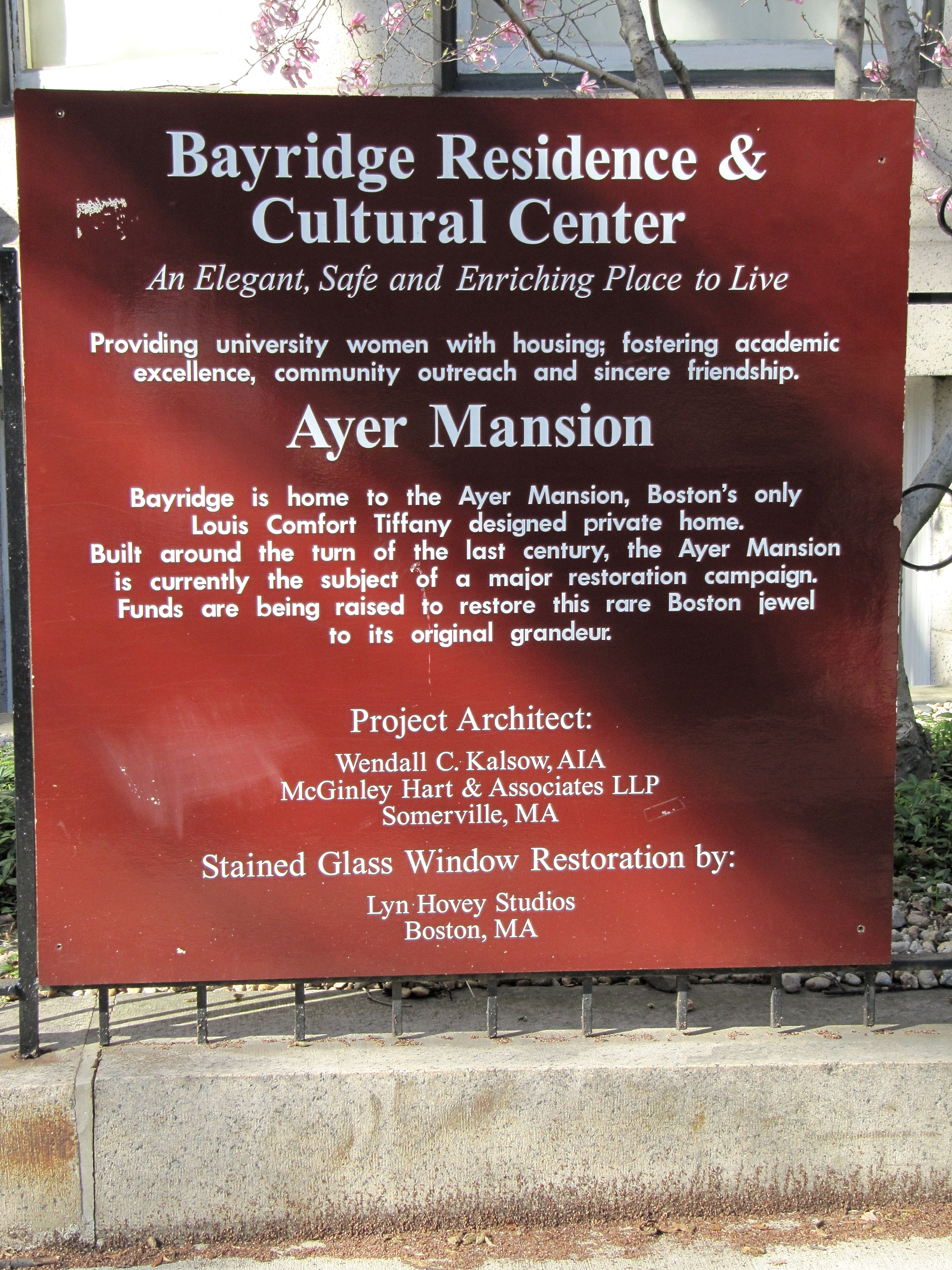
Bayridge Residence & Cultural Center sign next to front gate of Ayer Mansion

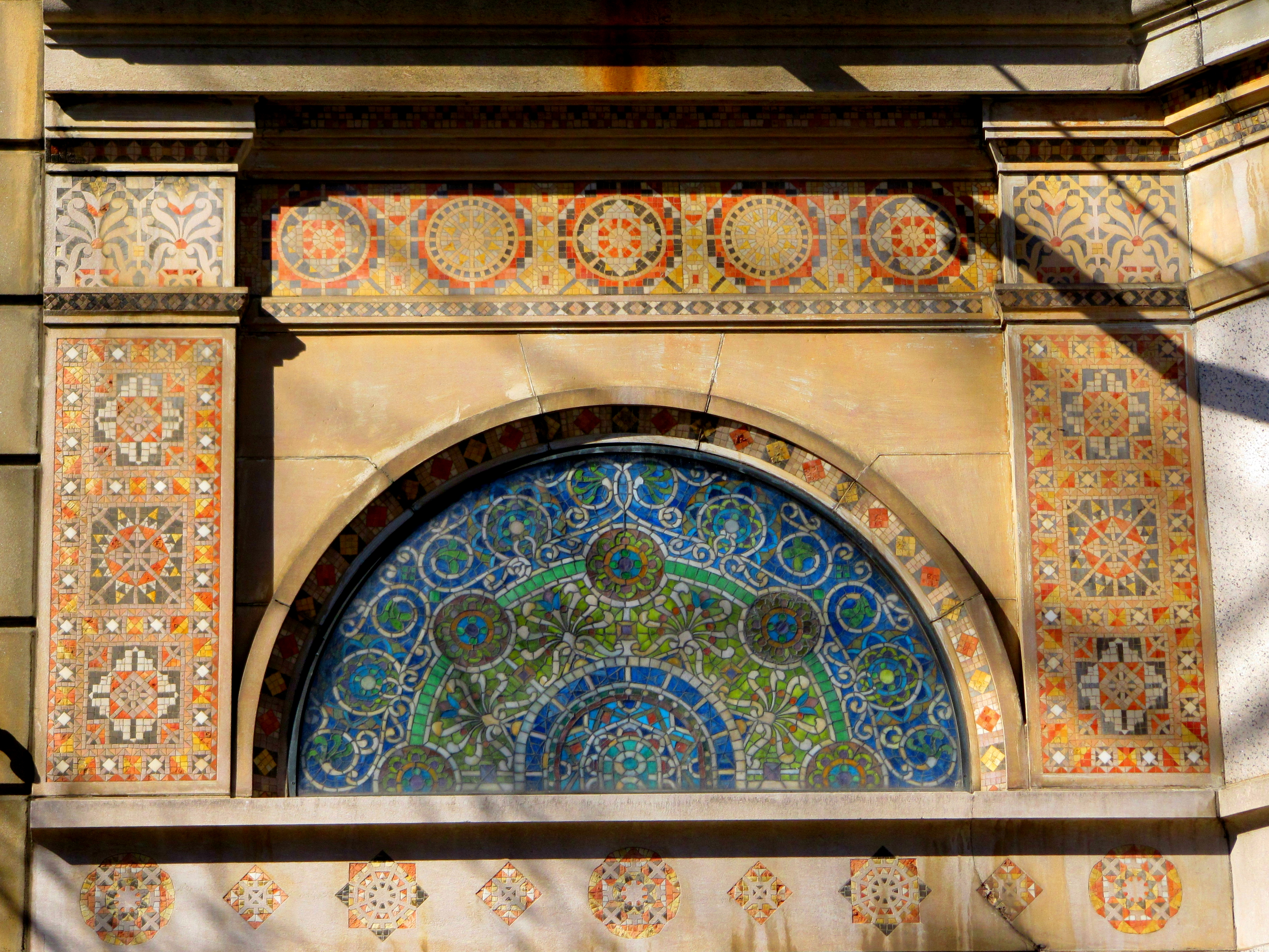
Exterior mosaic detail above the main entrance

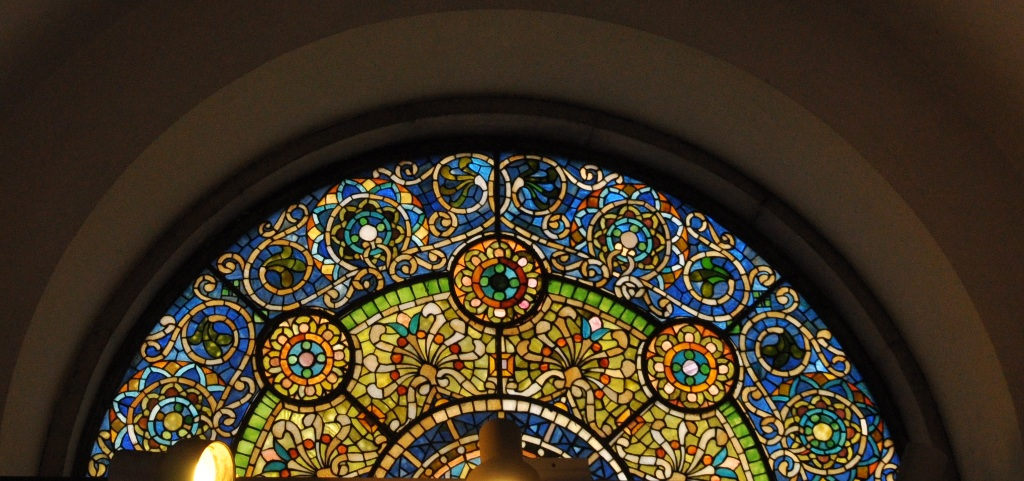
Stained glass window seen in exterior detail image

== See also ==
- List of National Historic Landmarks in Boston
- National Register of Historic Places listings in northern Boston, Massachusetts
