= Moxie =

Carbonated beverage

- Manufacturer: The Coca-Cola Company
- Origin: United States, New England
- Introduced: 1876; 150 years ago
- Discontinued: Moxie Cherry Cola, Moxie Cream Soda, Moxie Orange Cream, Ted's Root Beer, Moxie Energy, Moxie Energy Citrus, Moxie Energy Explosion, Moxie Energy Thunder, Olde New England Seltzer, Moxie Blue Cream
- Color: Caramel
- Variants: Diet Moxie
- Website: drinkmoxie.com

Moxie is a brand of carbonated beverage that is among the first mass-produced soft drinks in the United States. It was created around 1876 by Augustin Thompson as a patent medicine called "Moxie Nerve Food" and was produced in Lowell, Massachusetts. It is flavored with gentian root extract, an extremely bitter substance commonly used in herbal medicine.

Moxie was designated the official soft drink of Maine on May 10, 2005. It continues to be regionally popular today, particularly in New England states. It was previously produced by the Moxie Beverage Company of Bedford, New Hampshire, until Moxie was purchased by The Coca-Cola Company in 2018.

The beverage name is the source of the word "moxie" in the American English vernacular, a noun meaning energy, determination, and spunk.

== History ==
1921 song promoting the soda, sung by Arthur Fields

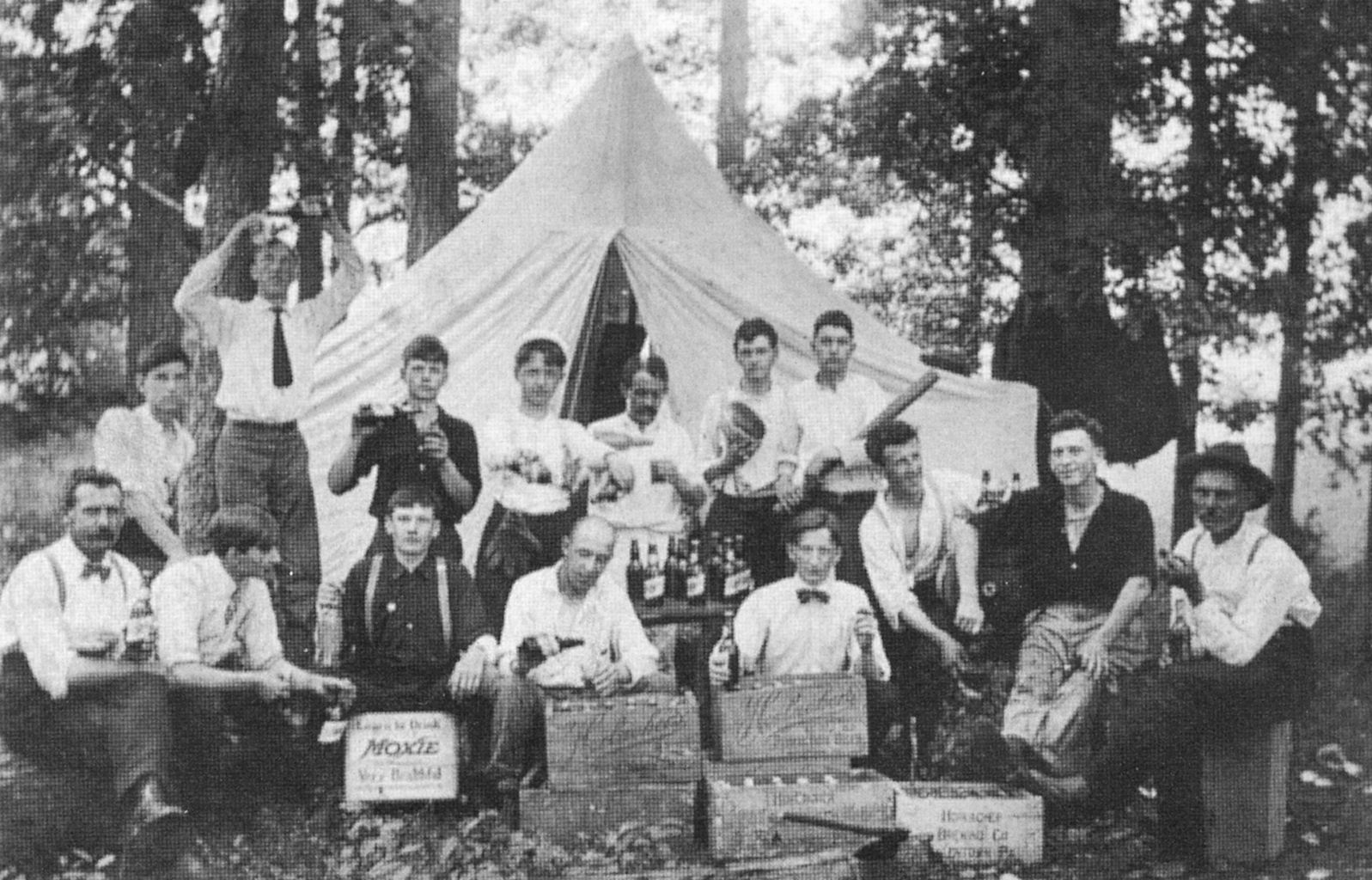
A group of friends from Allentown, Pennsylvania, celebrating Independence Day in 1913 with a case of Moxie

Moxie originated around 1876 as a patent medicine called "Moxie Nerve Food", by Augustin Thompson in Lowell, Massachusetts. Thompson claimed that it contained an extract from a rare, unnamed South American plant, which is now known to be gentian root. Moxie, he claimed, was especially effective against "paralysis, softening of the brain, nervousness, and insomnia".

Thompson claimed that he named the beverage after a Lieutenant Moxie, a purported friend of his, whom he claimed had discovered the plant and used it as a panacea, and the company he created continued to promulgate legendary stories about the word's origin. In Maine, where Thompson was born and raised, the word moxie, apparently of Algonquian origin, appears in lake and river names, such as Moxie Falls, and in the local name of a plant, the moxie-plum; it is likely that Thompson borrowed the name from one of those. The Online Etymology Dictionary proposes that the term is an Abenaki word meaning 'dark water', while Frederic Cassidy argued that its origin was an Algonquian root maski-, meaning 'herbal infusion'.

After a few years, Thompson added soda water to the formula and changed the product's name to "Beverage Moxie Nerve Food". By 1884 he was selling Moxie both in bottles and in bulk as a soda fountain syrup. In 1885, he received a trademark for the term. He marketed it as "a delicious blend of bitter and sweet, a drink to satisfy everyone's taste." Thompson died in 1903.

In 1907, the Moxie Nerve Food Company of New England filed a lawsuit in Boston against the Modox Company and others, alleging that they had copied the ingredients of Moxie and were using the name "Modox", which closely resembles "Moxie", and were infringing upon patents and trademarks. The suit was dismissed by the judge, who said the court could not protect the legitimate part of the plaintiff's business in this case. In a later case in New York, the Moxie Nerve Food Company won a lawsuit against Modox, which subsequently went out of business.

President Calvin Coolidge was known to favor the drink, and Boston Red Sox slugger Ted Williams endorsed it on radio and in print. The company also marketed a beverage called "Ted's Root Beer" in the early sixties. Author E. B. White once claimed that "Moxie contains gentian root, which is the path to the good life."

The brand suffered a significant decline in sales during the 1930s.

The Catawissa Bottling Company in Catawissa, Pennsylvania, is one of six bottlers in the United States that produce Moxie. Catawissa has produced it since 1945. Polar Beverages also bottles Moxie in Worcester, Massachusetts, as does Orca Beverage in Mukilteo, Washington.

=== Since 1962 ===
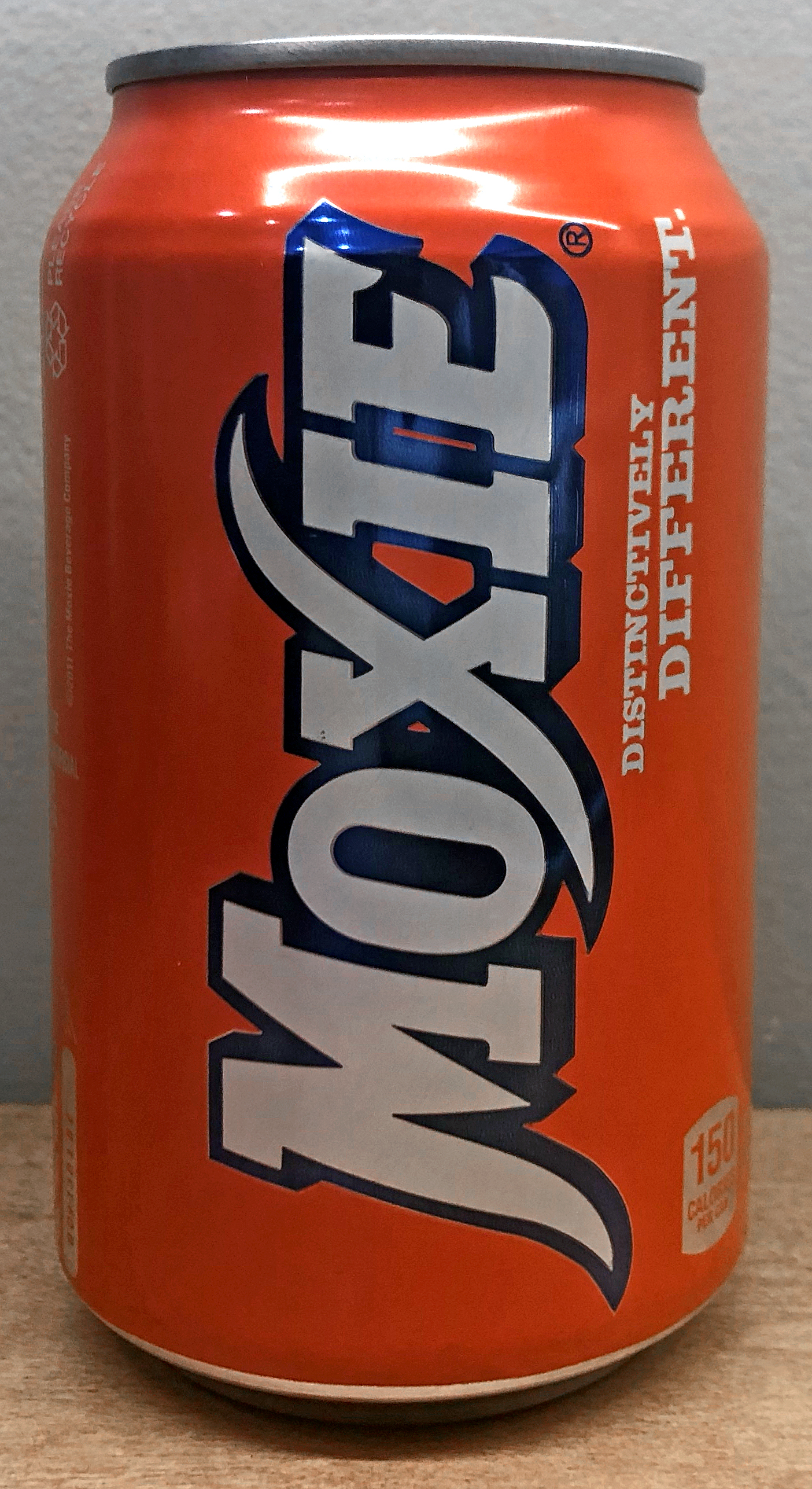
A can of Moxie from 2018

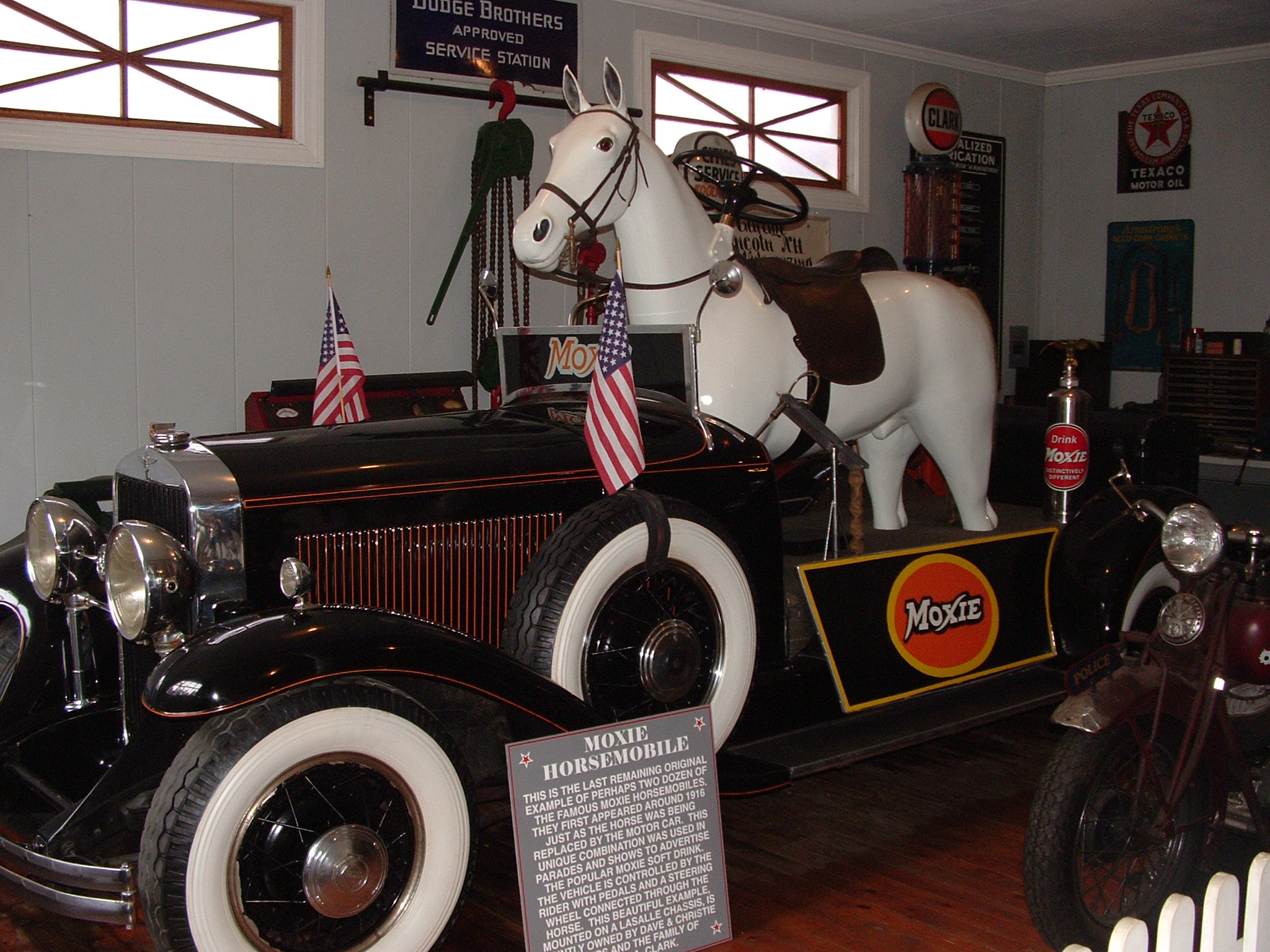
Moxie Horsemobile. This one was built on a LaSalle sedan. It is on display at Clark's Trading Post in Lincoln, New Hampshire.

Sugar-free Diet Moxie was introduced in 1962, three years after Mad magazine began placing the Moxie logo in the background of its articles, which increased public awareness of it. The magazine also introduced a short-lived girlfriend for its mascot Alfred E. Neuman who was named "Moxie." As a result of Mad's efforts, sales of the soft drink increased 10% which led to the "Mad About Moxie" campaign.

The Moxie brand was purchased in 1966 by the Monarch Beverage Company of Atlanta. In 2007 Monarch sold it to its previous owner, Cornucopia Beverages of Bedford, New Hampshire, which is owned by the Coca-Cola Bottling Company of Northern New England, a subsidiary of the Kirin Brewery Company, which is a subsidiary of Kirin Company, Limited, which is a subsidiary of Kirin Holdings Company, Limited, based in Tokyo, Japan (a member of the Mitsubishi keiretsu).

In its decision to step up efforts to distribute the product, Cornucopia cited increasing requests for Moxie from fans across the country. In 2007 it launched pilot sales in Florida and in 2010 granted distribution in Florida to Florida Micro Beverage Distributors.

In 2011, Cornucopia began doing business as the Moxie Beverage Company to market Moxie and Moxie-branded products. A website, DrinkMoxie.com, was created to promote Moxie. Drink recipes using Moxie were created.

Demand for Moxie has waned in recent years, although the brand persists in New England and Pennsylvania.

On August 28, 2018, the Coca-Cola Company announced its purchase of Moxie from Coca-Cola Bottling Company of Northern New England Inc. for an unspecified amount.

== Advertising ==
The original Moxie logo featuring the "Moxie Man" on the label of a derivative product

Moxie advertising in the 19th and early 20th centuries emphasized Moxie as a health drink and "nerve food".

In its advertising, Moxie used "Make Mine Moxie!" jingles, the slogan "Just Make It Moxie for Mine", and a "Moxie Man" logo. The Moxie Man has appeared on labels in some form since 1906, and the image of a man pointing forward most associated with the brand was first introduced in 1911. The identity of the "Moxie Man", or "Moxie Boy" as he was called in the 1920s, was apparently not known at that time, with a 1922 ad in the Boston Herald by F. M. Archer proclaiming "in almost every town and city in the United States there is someone who believes they know the original of the Moxie Boy. In view of the many thousands of different opinions on this subject, we may offer a prize to the person who picks the actual boy, furnishing us photographic proofs, etc...the Moxie Boy, now a man (and some man at that), who posed for this picture many, many years ago, in fact before some of the readers of this article were born." For many years the urban legend was that Archer himself was Moxie's mascot, but he would have been about 50 at its introduction in 1911, disproving this theory. In recent years a historical group, The Moxie Congress, was able to ascertain that the man was likely a model for the lithographers printing these advertisements, and with some confidence it is posited that the "Moxie Boy" was one John T. Chamberlain of Revere, Massachusetts. In 2010 the Moxie Man logo was removed from labels for a brief period because it was thought to be too old-fashioned. In 2011 the company's head of marketing, Ryan Savage, made the executive decision to bring the logo back in response to complaints from long-standing customers.

A unique advertising tool was the Moxie Horsemobile, a modified automobile whose driver sits on a large model of a horse (patented February 27, 1917)

=== 21st century advertising ===
Following the 2007 Cornucopia sale, Moxie marketing sought to capitalize on Moxie's delicacy status by reclaiming an old slogan, "Distinctively Different". One facet of the marketing strategy was 'Moxology', a push to incorporate Moxie into cooking and cocktails; recipes included the 'New Englander', a highball of Moxie and gin featuring Worcestershire sauce.

== Derivative products ==
There is a Moxie Energy Drink and a variety of Olde New England Seltzers. The energy drink is citrus-based; it lacks Moxie's gentian root flavor, caramel color, and (as of 2008) its distinctive branding; similarly, the waters are simply carbonated waters with fruit flavors marketed under the Moxie brand.

Moxie ice cream is seasonally available in Maine in limited quantities and is milder in flavor than the soft drink.

Moxie has been used as a cooking additive by chefs for its herbaceous, savory-sweet flavor profile. It is generally used in reductions as a glaze for meats such as lamb, as well as in baked beans.

== "Moxie" as a slang term ==
Moxie was early advertised as "nerve food" which would "strengthen the nervous system" and was "very healthful" and a "drink for athletes" which "strengthens and invigorates". The term "moxie", which derives from the drink name, has the approximate meaning of "energy, determination, spunk, daring courage, nerve, spirit, guts". This term was extant from about the 1930s and has continued in use, to some extent, into the early 21st century, as in "This kid's got moxie!"

== See also ==
- List of brand name soft drink products
