= Frederick Ayer =

American businessman (1822–1918)

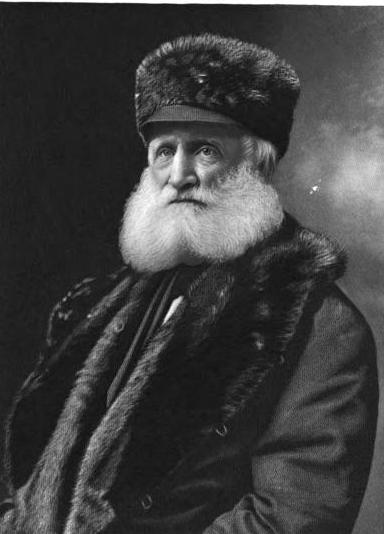
- Born: December 8, 1822; Ledyard, Connecticut, U.S.
- Died: March 14, 1918 (aged 95); Thomasville, Georgia, U.S.
- Occupation: Businessman
- Spouses: Cornelia Wheaton (m. 1858; died 1878); Ellen Barrows Banning (m. 1884, died)
- Children: 7
- Relatives: James Cook Ayer (brother); George S. Patton (son-in-law); George S. Patton IV (grandson); Mark Gordon (great-grandson); Frederick Ayer Jr. (grandson)

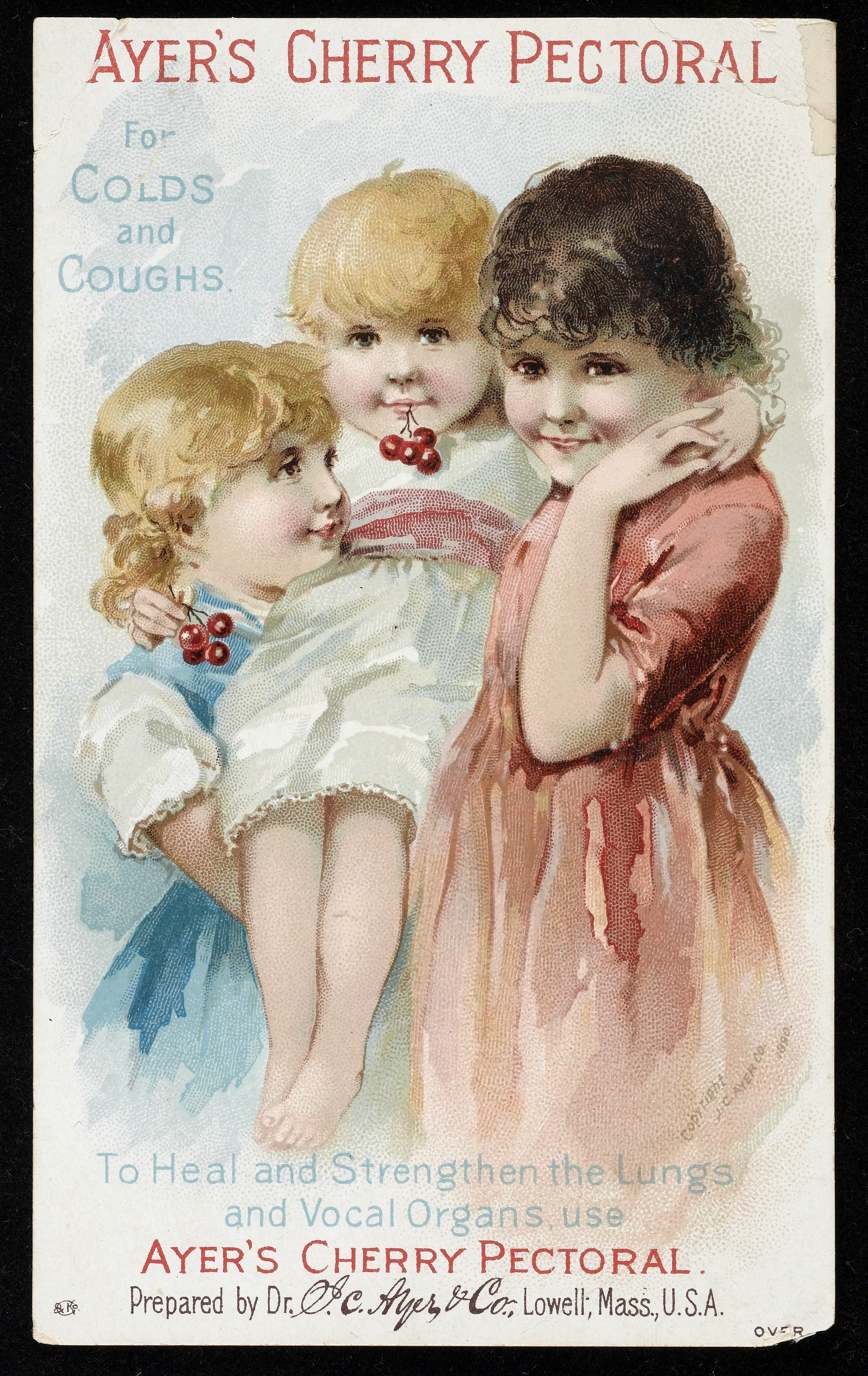
Advert for Ayers Cherry Pectoral

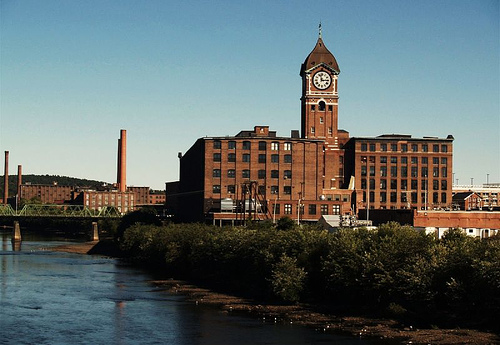
Ayer Mill, Lawrence, Massachusetts, named for Frederick.

Frederick Ayer (December 8, 1822 – March 14, 1918) was an American businessman and the younger brother of patent medicine tycoon James Cook Ayer.

== Early life ==
Ayer was born on December 8, 1822, in Ledyard, Connecticut, and was the son of Frederick Ayer (1792–1825) and Persis Herrick (née Cook) Ayer (1786–1880).

His nephew, J.C. Ayer's son, was also Frederick Ayer. Frederick Fanning Ayer, born in 1851, became a lawyer and philanthropist, and was director or stockholder of many corporations.

== Career ==
Ayer was involved in the patent medicine business, but is better known for his work in the textile industry. After buying the Tremont and Suffolk mills in Lowell, Massachusetts, he bought up many textile operations in nearby Lawrence, combining them in 1899 into the American Woolen Company, of which he was the first president. He was involved in other businesses of the time as well, such as being the co-founder of the Arctic Coal Company.

== Personal life ==
Ayer's first wife was Cornelia Wheaton (1835–1878), daughter of Charles Augustus Wheaton and Ellen Birdseye. They married on December 15, 1858, and Cornelia's mother died the following day. The couple had four children:

- Ellen Wheaton Ayer (1859–1951), who married American Woolen Company's William Madison Wood.
- James Cook Ayer (1862–1939)
- Charles Fanning Ayer (1865–1956)
- Louise Raynor Ayer (1876–1955).

After Cornelia's death, Ayer married Ellen Barrows Banning (1853–1918) in 1884. They had three children:

- Beatrice Banning Ayer (1886–1953), who married future World War II general George S. Patton.
- Frederick Ayer (1888–1969)
- Mary Katherine "Kay" Ayer (1890–1981).

He died on March 14, 1918, in Thomasville, Georgia, and is interred at Lowell Cemetery. His home in Lowell is now the Franco American School, a Catholic school, and the Frederick Ayer Mansion on Commonwealth Avenue in Boston, Massachusetts is a National Historic Landmark.

== Archives and records ==
- Tremont & Suffolk Mills records at Baker Library Special Collections, Harvard Business School.
