= List of people from Lowell, Massachusetts =

As one of the largest cities in the Commonwealth of Massachusetts, Lowell has produced many notable people in various fields:

== Academics, science, and engineering ==
- Roger Boisjoly, mechanical engineer, fluid dynamicist, and an aerodynamicist; winner of the AAAS Award for Scientific Freedom and Responsibility in 1988 for raising concerns about material defects which were ignored by Morton Thiokol that resulted in the Space Shuttle Challenger Disaster
- George Bassett Clark, astronomer (reflective telescope)
- Samuel Luther Dana, chemist and consultant to the Merrimack Manufacturing Company
- Helen Sawyer Hogg, astronomer
- Louis Olney, professor of Chemistry at the Lowell Technological Institute; founder and first president of the American Association of Textile Chemists and Colorists
- Robert Keating O'Neill, librarian at Burns Library at Boston College (1987–2013)

== Law ==
- Frederick Aiken, lawyer and Civil War veteran, defense attorney for Mary Surratt
- Loren W. Collins, Minnesota jurist and legislator
- Alice Parker Lesser, 1880s–1900 lawyer who published many articles, and procured legislation for the property-owning rights of women
- Stanley Elroy Qua, chief justice of the Massachusetts Supreme Judicial Court

== Military service ==
- Charles Herbert Allen, representative to U.S. Congress, 4 March 1885 – 3 March 1889, secretary of the Navy 1898–1900, governor of Puerto Rico 1900–1902
- Adelbert Ames, governor 1868–1870,1874–1876 and senator from Mississippi 1870–1874, Union general in the Civil War and the Spanish–American War, son-in-law of Benjamin Franklin Butler
- Benjamin Franklin Butler, congressman 1867–1879, Union general in the Civil War, governor of Massachusetts 1883–1884, and Greenback Party presidential candidate 1884, for whom the Butler School is named
- Gustavus Fox, assistant secretary of the Navy during the Civil War
- Mary Hallaren, director of Women's Army Corps
- John McFarland, Medal of Honor recipient, Civil War, for whom the USS McFarland is named
- David H. McNerney, Medal of Honor recipient, Vietnam
- Ryan M. Pitts, Medal of Honor recipient, Afghanistan
- Joseph A. Sladen, Union Army Medal of Honor recipient, raised in Lowell
- Charles Sweeney, USAF major who piloted the B-29 Bockscar on its mission to drop the Fat Man nuclear weapon on Nagasaki
- Edgar A. Wedgwood, sheriff of Hall County, Nebraska and adjutant general of the Utah National Guard

== Politics and public service ==
- Sokhary Chau, mayor of Lowell
- Leroy Bowers Crane (1849–1916), member of the New York State Assembly
- Benjamin Dean (1824–1897), U.S. representative for Massachusetts
- Mark DeSaulnier (born 1952), U.S. representative for California
- Maurice K. Goddard (1912–1995), secretary of the Pennsylvania Department of Environmental Protection and Pennsylvania Department of Conservation and Natural Resources
- Frederic T. Greenhalge (1842–1896), U.S. representative and governor of Massachusetts
- Allen Hobbs (1899–1960), United States Navy officer and governor of American Samoa
- Walker Lewis (1798–1856), abolitionist, freemason, and Mormon elder
- Marty Meehan (born 1956), U.S. representative and president of the University of Massachusetts
- Addison W. Merrill (1842–1920), member of the Wisconsin State Assembly
- Rady Mom (born 1970), member of the Massachusetts House of Representatives
- F. Bradford Morse (1921–1994), U.S. representative and administrator of the United Nations Development Programme
- Patrick O. Murphy (born 1982), mayor of Lowell
- Robert Preston (1929–2021), member of the New Hampshire Senate and businessman
- Edith Nourse Rogers (1881–1960), U.S. representative for Massachusetts
- John Jacob Rogers (1881–1925), U.S. representative for Massachusetts
- Parlan Semple (1832–1922), member of the Wisconsin State Assembly
- Emma H. Slade (died 1925), Founder of the National Society of New England Women and President National of the U.S. Daughters of 1812
- Ezekiel A. Straw (1819–1882), member of the New Hampshire Senate and governor of New Hampshire
- Nancy Achin Sullivan (1959–2022), member of the Massachusetts Senate
- Lori Trahan (born 1973), U.S. representative for Massachusetts
- Niki Tsongas (born 1946), U.S. representative for Massachusetts
- Paul Tsongas (1947–1997), U.S. senator for Massachusetts
- Emma Wolfe, chief of staff to the mayor of New York City and deputy mayor of New York City

== Industry, invention and business ==
- Frederick Ayer (1822–1918), industrialist, investor, first president of the American Woolen Company
- James Cook Ayer (1818–1878), industrialist, patent medicine tycoon
- Kirk Boott (1790–1837), industrialist, for whom the Boott Mills and Kirk Street are named
- Milton Bradley, founder of the Milton Bradley Company, developed board games
- Fred C. Church, founder of Fred C. Church Insurance
- Telemachus & George Demoulas, grocery store tycoons
- James B. Francis, pioneer of American civil engineering for whom the Francis Locks are named
- Daniel Gage, Gage Ice Company, for whom Gage Park and Gage Street are named
- Ted Leonsis, billionaire who worked at Wang labs
- Augustin Thompson, physician, businessman and philanthropist; created the Moxie soft drink
- An Wang, inventor and businessman, for whom the Wang Middle School is named
- Helen Augusta Whittier (1846–1925), first woman in Lowell to run a mill

== Astronautics ==
- Richard M. Linnehan, NASA astronaut 1992–present; five space missions to date, including Hubble Space Telescope upgrades and repairs

== Literature and entertainment ==
- Michael Ansara, actor
- Nicholas A. Basbanes, author and cultural historian (A Gentle Madness, On Paper)
- Jen Beagin, author (Pretend I'm Dead, Vacuum in the Dark, Big Swiss)
- Michael Casey, poet
- Michael Chiklis, Emmy Award and Golden Globe Award-winning actor
- Cora Linn Daniels, writer
- Bette Davis, Academy Award-winning actress
- George Washington Dixon, entertainer and newspaper editor
- Joseph Donahue, poet, critic, teacher
- Olympia Dukakis, Academy Award-winning actress (Moonstruck)
- Mark Goddard, actor (Lost in Space)
- Ray Goulding, radio comedian (of Bob & Ray)
- James P. Hogan, film director
- Deborah Hopkinson, children's author
- Jujubee, drag performer, Season 2 of Rupaul's Drag Race
- Nancy Kelly, Tony Award-winning actress, nominated for Academy Award and Emmy Awards (36 movies)
- Jack Kerouac, writer (On the Road), for whom the downtown park is named
- Jonathan Lemire, host of Way Too Early with Jonathan Lemire
- Elinor Lipman, writer, columnist The Boston Globe
- Ed McMahon, entertainer, announcer, actor
- Matt Mira, comedian, The Nerdist Podcast
- Giuseppina Morlacchi, ballerina, dancer, and actress who introduced the can-can to the American stage
- Louis Phillips, author, poet, and dramatist
- Maryann Plunkett, actor
- O. Leonard Press (1921–2019), creator, founder, and television producer for Kentucky Educational Television
- José Carlos Rodrigues, Brazilian journalist
- Tom Sexton, writer
- Harriette Lucy Robinson Shattuck (1850–1937), author, writer on parliamentary law, suffragist
- Paul Sullivan, sports radio personality WBZ and columnist for Lowell Sun
- Robert Tessier, actor and stuntman
- Vince Vouyer, porn star
- Lance Wilder, animator and background designer mostly known for work on The Simpsons

== Music ==
- Astronoid, post-metal band
- Bob Bachelder, orchestra leader and educator
- George Whitefield Chadwick, composer
- Rosalind Elias, opera singer
- Colleen Green, rock and roll musician
- Scott Grimes, voice actor and singer
- Hell Within, hardcore/metal band from Lowell
- Gary Hoey, guitar player
- Boney James, saxophonist, songwriter, and record producer
- John Kellette, songwriter, actor, director
- Professor Lyrical, rapper and professor
- PVRIS, alternative rock band
- Marietta Sherman Raymond, musical educator and orchestral conductor
- The Shods, rock band from Lowell; were awarded the Key to City of Lowell
- Vein, metalcore band

== Arts and design ==
- Charles H. Allen, painter and 1st governor of Puerto Rico
- Margaret Foley (1820–1877), sculptor
- Adelia Sarah Gates (c. 1823–1912), botanical illustrator and watercolorist
- David Hilliard (1964– ), photographer
- Thomas B. Lawson (1807–1888), landscape painter
- Christopher Makos (1948– ), photographer, artist
- Willard Leroy Metcalf (1858–1925), Impressionist painter
- David Dalhoff Neal (1838–1915), portrait painter
- Alfred Ordway (1821–1897), landscape painter
- William Preston Phelps (1848–1917), landscape painter
- Frederick W. Stickney (1854–1918), architect, master of stone architecture
- James McNeill Whistler (1834–1903), painter and etcher
- Sarah W. Whitman (1842–1904), artist, illustrator, stained glass designer, and author

== Sports ==
=== Basketball ===
- Harry "Bucky" Lew, became first African-American professional basketball player when he joined the New England League in 1902
- Terance Mann, NBA player for the Los Angeles Clippers, grew up in Lowell
- Alex Oriakhi, NBA player drafted by the Phoenix Suns, grew up in Lowell

=== Football ===
- Steve Alexakos, lineman for Denver Broncos 1970, New York Giants 1971
- Bill Cooke, defensive line for Green Bay Packers 1975, San Francisco 49ers 1976–77, Detroit Lions 1978, and Seattle Seahawks 1978–1980
- John Blake Galvin, Jr., linebacker for New York Jets 1988–1991
- Bruce Laird, Pro Bowl cornerback for Baltimore Colts 1972–1983
- Menil Mavraides, offensive lineman for Philadelphia Eagles 1954, 1957
- Ray McLean, halfback for Chicago Bears 1940–1948, Head Coach of the Green Bay Packers 1953,1958
- John Miller, lineman for Washington Redskins 1956–1960
- Anthony Prior, gridiron football player
- Ray Riddick, end for the Green Bay Packers 1940–1946, for whom a high school gymnasium is named
- Billy Sullivan, owner of New England Patriots 1960–1988
- Robert Joseph Sullivan, running back for San Francisco 49ers 1948

=== Baseball ===
- Mike Balas, pitched one game for the Boston Bees in 1938
- Johnny Barrett, outfielder for the Pittsburgh Pirates, 1942–1946
- Skippy Roberge, infielder for the Boston Braves, 1941–1942, 1946

=== Hockey ===
- Jon Morris, center for New Jersey Devils 1984–1992, Boston Bruins 1993

=== Boxing ===
- Dicky Eklund, pro boxer 1975–1985, welterweight
- Ralph Lally, New England Golden Gloves champion, light heavyweight-175lbs., 1970
- Micky Ward, pro boxer 1985–2003, junior welterweight

=== Olympic athletes ===
- Shelagh Donohoe, 1992 Barcelona, won silver medal in rowing (women's coxless fours), current URI head coach
- Ernest N. Harmon, 1924 Paris, finished 31st in modern pentathlon (5th in shooting); U.S. Army major general in World War II; president of Norwich University 1950–1956
- Alfons Mello Travers, 1924 Paris, finished 5th in men's welterweight boxing, turned pro and finished 37/10 with 18 KOs; retired as a restaurant owner in Lowell

=== Other sports ===
- Louis Cyr, French-Canadian strongman, lived in Lowell 1878–1883
- Billy Pappas, professional foosball player
- Manny Santiago, professional skateboarder

== Religion ==
- Sufi Abdul Hamid, Islamic religious and labor leader
- Roger J. Landry, priest of the Diocese of Fall River
- Roger Morin, bishop
- William Henry O'Connell, cardinal, Archdiocese of Boston

== Other ==
- Hugh Cummiskey (1789–1871), labor leader
- Thaddeus Mortimer Fowler, cartographer
- Robert Gleason (1970–2013), serial killer and last person to die in Virginia’s electric chair
- John Ogonowski (1951–2001), pilot of American Airlines Flight 11
- O. Leonard Press, educational radio and television broadcaster
- Lucy Robbins Messer Switzer (1844–1922), temperance activist
- David Rocheville (1968–1999), one of the two perpetrators in the murders of Alex Hopps and James Green
