= Comiskey (surname) =

Family name

- Comiskey: Family Crest

Comiskey (Irish: Mac Cumascaigh) is a surname found especially in County Monaghan, Ulster, Ireland, where a branch held a family seat. The name was first recorded as being descended from Fiacha Suidhe, a younger brother of Conn of the Hundred Battles. Variants include: Cumiskey, Comaskey, Comesky, Commiskey, and Cummiskey.

== Notable people ==
=== Comiskey ===
- Andrew Comiskey, American Christian theologian
- Barrett Comiskey (born 1975), American inventor, founder and CEO of Migo
- Brendan Comiskey (1935–2025), Irish Roman Catholic bishop of the Diocese of Ferns
- Dan Comiskey (born 1972), Canadian football offensive lineman for the Edmonton Eskimos of the Canadian Football League
- Patrick Comiskey, American journalist and wine writer
- An American family in the history of the Baseball team Chicago White Sox:
  - John Comiskey (politician) (1826–1900), father of Charles Comiskey
  - Charles Comiskey (1859–1931), player, manager, team owner
  - J. Louis Comiskey (1885–1939), son of Charles, inherited the White Sox
  - Grace Comiskey (1894–1956), widow of J. Louis, inherited the White Sox
  - Dorothy Comiskey Rigney (1917–1971), daughter of J. Louis and Grace, inherited a majority interest in the White Sox
  - Chuck Comiskey (1925–2007), son of J. Louis and Grace, inherited a minority interest in the White Sox

=== Commiskey ===
- Chuck Commiskey (born 1958), American former football guard and center
- Henry A. Commiskey Sr. (1927–1971), United States Marine Corps officer who was awarded the Medal of Honor for his actions in the Korean War
