= Hallaren =

Hallaren is a surname. Notable people with the surname include:

- Jane Hallaren (born 1940), American actress
- Mary Hallaren (1907–2005), director of the U.S. Women's Army Corps
