= Comiskey =

Comiskey may refer to:

- Comiskey Park, a ballpark in which the Chicago White Sox played from 1910 to 1990
- New Comiskey Park, the White Sox playing venue since 1991
- Comiskey, Kansas, a ghost town

== People with the surname ==
- Comiskey (surname)

== See also ==
- Commiskey, Indiana
