= Harold Reitman =

American physician

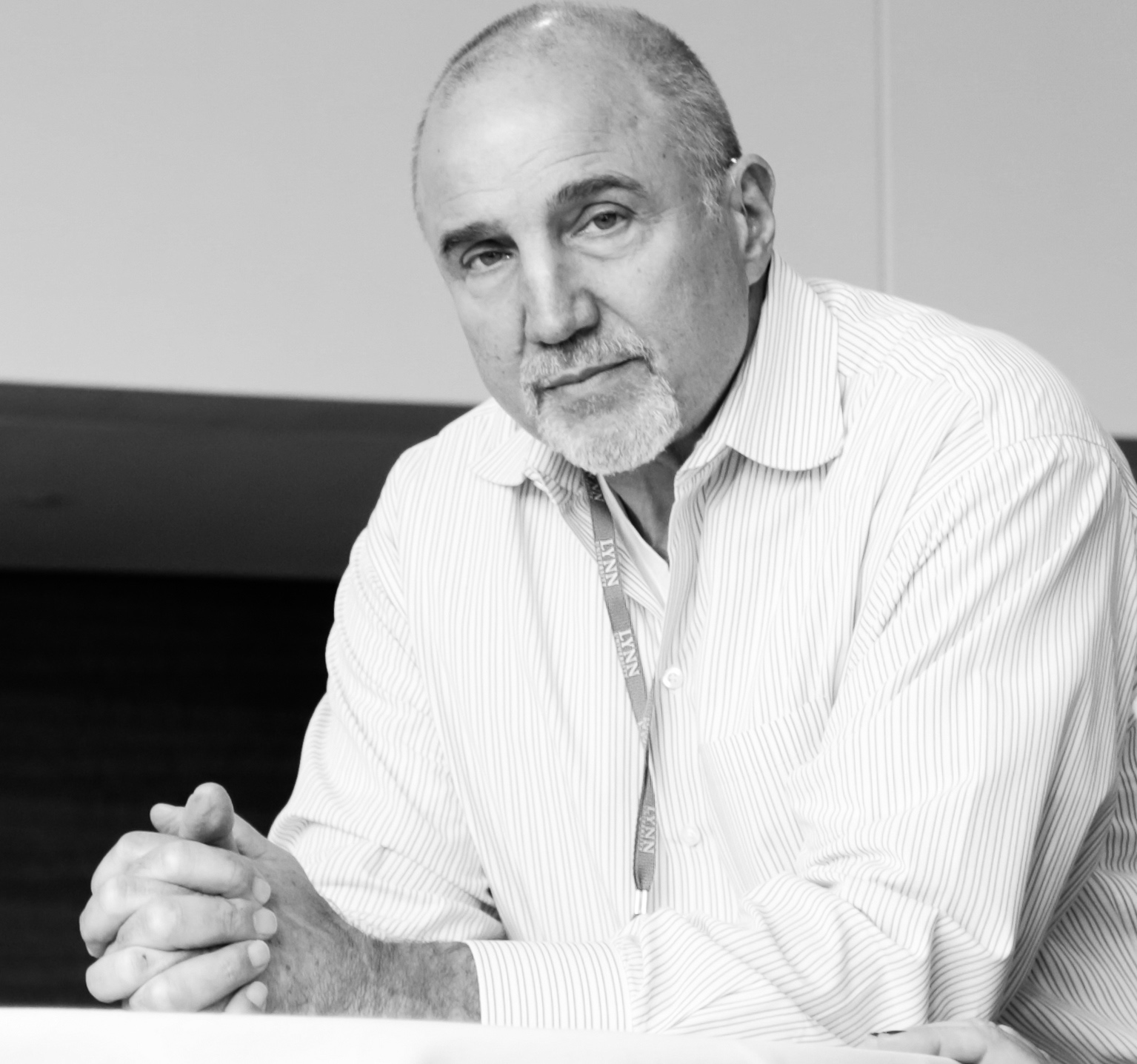
- Born: 29 March 1950; Jersey City, New Jersey
- Died: 4 March 2025 (aged 74); Weston, Florida
- Citizenship: American
- Education: Boston University School of Medicine
- Occupations: Philanthropist; entrepreneur; author; surgeon; boxer
- Years active: 1978–2025
- Children: 1

Harold "Hackie" Stuart Reitman (March 29, 1950 – March 4, 2025, Weston, Florida) was an American orthopedic surgeon, former professional boxer, entrepreneur, author, and philanthropist. He was the founder and CEO of Different Brains. Reitman fought as a professional heavyweight boxer while working full-time as an orthopedic surgeon, and was widely referred to as the Boxing Doctor during his career.

== Early life ==
Reitman, who went by the nickname, "Hackie", grew up in the Greenville section of Jersey City, the youngest of four children. Reitman's parents owned a gas station where his father Phil worked as a mechanic and his mother Evelyn pumped gas. Reitman started boxing at the age of 13 at the Jewish Community Center in Jersey City. He graduated from Henry Snyder High School where he played varsity basketball. In the fall of 1968, Reitman entered the accelerated six-year medical program at Boston University School of Medicine. In his first year of medical school, Reitman surprised classmates and faculty by entering the 1971 New England Golden Gloves championships in Lowell, MA as a heavyweight. Reitman won all four of his fights by knockout and became the 1971 New England Golden Gloves heavyweight champion. Following the title fight, Reitman was approached by Boston promoter Sam Silverman and a New York investment group who offered Reitman a $100,000 professional contract bonus on the condition he leave medical school and turn professional heavyweight boxer. Reitman declined the offer and completed his medical school studies.

== Medical career ==
During medical school, Reitman often worked as the house doctor at sporting events at the Boston Garden. He graduated from Boston University School of Medicine in 1974 and began an internship at St. Joseph's Regional Medical Center in Paterson, NJ. He entered the Boston University Orthopedic Residency Program the following year and served rotations at the Lahey Hospital & Medical Center, Shriners Hospital for Children, in Springfield, Mass. and Boston Medical Center and as Chief Resident at Boston City Hospital.

In 1978, Reitman moved to Plantation, Florida, where he founded Orthopaedic Associates USA. A specialist in arthroscopic knee surgery and sports medicine, Reitman served as senior surgeon and CEO, expanding the practice throughout South Florida. Reitman retired from surgery in 2004.

Reitman would travel from Florida to Boston University School of Medicine as "Clinical Assistant Professor of Anatomy" to deliver his annual lecture to all first-year medical students, Clinical Anatomy of the Upper Extremity, a tradition that continued through 2011. Reitman was a fellow of the American Academy of Orthopedic Surgeons, the American College of Surgeons, and the International College of Surgeons.

== Professional boxing career ==
In 1986, Reitman's 4-year-old son Asa required emergency brain surgery and was transported by air to the Mayo Clinic. This event had a profound impact on Reitman and would serve as the driving force behind his subsequent dedication to professional boxing. Reitman made a personal vow to revive his boxing career in order to raise money for children's charities. Asa survived the surgery, and Reitman and another parent from the Mayo clinic, Ed Zbikowski, whose son also underwent brain surgery, organized a charity card in Chicago that matched Reitman against Illinois Judge Mike Bolan in a three-round amateur fight sanctioned by the ABF. Reitman won the fight by knocking out Bolan in the third round. The proceeds from the event were donated to St. Jude's Children's Research Hospital in Memphis. In 1988, Reitman performed knee surgery on boxing manager and promoter Tommy Torino, a former middleweight fighter. Torino agreed to take on Reitman in his bid to become a professional fighter and became his manager and trainer. At that time, the Florida State Athletic Commission only allowed boxers to fight up to the age of 35 and turned Reitman down in his first attempt to acquire a professional boxing license. On appeal, Torino traveled to Tallahassee and convinced the commission that Reitman deserved an exception, and after a thorough health exam the commission granted him a license. In 1988, at the age of 37, Reitman turned professional.

Reitman went on to win his first three sanctioned professional fights. As a heavyweight, he won seven of his first nine fights, including six knockouts in the first two rounds. All of Reitman's fight purses were donated to various children's charities. He gained widespread media attention around this time and was often referred to as the "Boxing Doctor" or Fighting Surgeon, a name that stuck throughout his career. Early in his career, Reitman trained out of the famed 5th Street Gym in Miami Beach, Florida. Former lightweight world champion Beau Jack worked as Reitman's fitness conditioner and boxing mentor. When the gym was demolished in 1993, Reitman moved his training to Gerrits Leprechaun Gym in Miami.

On February 15, 1991, with a professional record of 7-1-1, Reitman fought a three-round charity exhibition match against the five-time world champion Roberto Durán at the Hollywood Diplomat Hotel in Miami Beach. On November 11, 1991, Reitman fought heavyweight Tim Anderson for the NBA Independent Cruiserweight title in a televised fight. Though Reitman scored two 9th round knockdowns, the fight ended in a draw. In March 1992, Reitman was the 12th ranked Heavyweight boxer in the world according to the International Boxing Council. On December 12, 1995, in a scheduled 10 round main event fight, Reitman lost to heavyweight Peter McNeeley, who had only been defeated twice in his career, with one of those defeats having occurred at the hands of Mike Tyson several months earlier.

In December 2000, Reitman fought Kenny Lunkins in a scheduled 10 round main event at War Memorial Auditorium in Fort Lauderdale, FL. At the age of 50, Reitman was the state of Florida's oldest active fighter. Reitman retired from boxing in 2002 at the age of 52, with a lifetime record of 13-7-6, with 11 knockouts.

== Professional boxing record ==
26 fights	13 wins	7 losses
By knockout	11	0
By decision	2	7
Draws	6	

No.	Result	Record	Opponent	Type	Round, time	Date	Location
26	Loss	13-7-6	Kenny Lunkins	Heavyweight	6, 8	Dec 15, 2000	Memorial Auditorium, Ft. Lauderdale, FL

== Philanthropy ==
During his boxing career, Reitman donated all of his fight purses to various children's charities, including the Make A Wish Foundation, Kids In Distressed Situations, The Boys and Girls Club of Broward County, Children's Home Society, The Ann Storck Center for the Disabled, St. Jude Children's Research Hospital, and others.

Reitman was a longtime supporter of the Boys and Girls Club, and was a member of the board for the Boys and Girls Clubs of Broward County, serving as chairman of the board in 2001. Reitman donated the building at 3025 W. Broward Blvd that is now known as the Dr. Harold 'Hackie' Reitman Unit Boys and Girls Club.

== Awards ==
- Florida Medical Association's 2002 Harold S. Strasser, M.D. Good Samaritan Award.
- Emerald Society 2000 Humanitarian of the Year;
- Healthy Mothers-Healthy Babies 2002 Honorary Award;
- Reitman was inducted into the Broward County Sports Hall of Fame on Oct. 15, 2002
- Reitman was inducted into the Florida Boxing Hall of Fame in 2011.

== Recent business ==
In 2010, Reitman wrote, produced, and co-directed the feature length independent film, The Square Root of 2, starring Darby Stanchfield. In 2017, Reitman Co-Produced the feature documentary film Foreman, based on the life of legendary boxer George Foreman. He served as CEO of PCE Media LLC, the entertainment company he founded in 2004. Reitman was also a partner in Milestone Apartment Developers LLP, a Colorado-based multifamily real estate development firm.

Reitman spent his last years in Fort Lauderdale, Florida.

== Advocacy ==
Reitman was a prominent Autism and Aspergers advocate, and active writer and lecturer on the topic of neurodiversity. His non-fiction work, Aspertools: The Practical Guide for Understanding and Embracing Asperger's, Autism Spectrum Disorders, and Neurodiversity, included his review of the scientific community's research conducted over the last nearly 40 years, and was published by HCI Books on April 7, 2015. In the first weeks after its release, it climbed to #1 on the Amazon Best Sellers list within the Autism and Aspergers category.

In 2015, he founded DifferentBrains.org, a non-profit organization developed to provide neurodiversity resources and inclusive support communities for those on the autism spectrum or with neurological disorders.

== Bibliography ==
- Reitman, Harold. S, Parker, Howard G. "Modern Concepts of Fracture Management" Surgical Clinics of North America: Symposium on Surgery at the Lahey Clinic. Vol. 56, #3, Jan, 1976.
- Reitman, Harold (2015). Aspertools: The Practical Guide for Understanding and Embracing Asperger's, Autism Spectrum Disorders, and Neurodiversity. HCI Books. ISBN 978-0757318535.
