= New England Golden Gloves =

Boxing competitions

As a franchise of the National Golden Gloves, the New England Golden Gloves is the annual amateur boxing competition for the New England states. It was founded by Father Bill Cuddy, and was first held in Boston in January 1930 at Mechanics Hall. In 1945 it relocated to a new venue, Lowell Memorial Auditorium in Lowell, Massachusetts, where it has remained an annual event. Competitors over the years have included boxing greats such as Rocky Marciano, Sugar Ray Leonard, Marvin Hagler, and Micky Ward. The competitions typically take place in January through February, with the winners heading to the National Golden Gloves in May.

== History ==
The New England Golden Gloves (NEGG) tournament was founded by Father Bill Cuddy who began planning the first tournament in 1929. Qualifying elimination bouts for the first NEGG tournament began in December 1929, and were held in Boston's Mechanics Hall under the auspices of St. Joseph Catholic Church. After these were completed the qualifying boxers competed in the official tournament which opened on January 6, 1930. Four qualifying boxers competed in each of the eight weight classes with a total of 24 bouts occurring during the tournament. The tournament's first winners included George Ostrow (Flyweight), Jackie Collins (Bantamweight), Patsy Pacino (Featherweight), Victor Lotti (Lightweight), Vernon Merlin (Welterweight), John Sweeney (Middleweight), Pat O'Flaherty (Light heavyweight), and Al Dean (Heavyweight).

The NEGG tournament was held again at Boston's Mechanics Hall on January 6, 1931, and January 4, 1932. The tournament was not held for several years until the Boston Globe Athletic Association reformed the tournament. This newly structured tournament was held in February 1937 at Boston Arena (semi-finals) and Boston Garden (finals, February 15, 1937). The finals in successive NEGG tournament were held at Boston Garden on December 5, 1938, and at the Boston Arena on October 30, 1939 and October 28, 1940.

In 1946 Robert Edward Seavey Sr. won the Golden Gloves at the age of 17, registered under the name of his older brother Albert. He won the Championship title again in 1947.

In the 1960s Ralph Lally, from Lowell, Massachusetts fought in the 75 Golden Glove bout with 67 KOs. His pro and Olympic hopes were dashed by his draft into the Vietnam War.

In 1971, the "Boxing Doctor" Harold Reitman was champion in the heavyweight division while in medical school.

In 1973, The New England Franchise (Lowell, Massachusetts) Hosted the National Tournament of Champions.

In the early 1980s pro boxer Micky Ward was 3 time New England Golden Gloves Champion.

In 1976-1980 pro boxer Irish Danny Cronin was 4 time new England golden gloves champion.

From 1987 to 1988. runner-up Lowell. Ma.John J Wojcik Jr. 2 time silver mittens Champion won 3 New England Golden Gloves Championships and was also a national runner-up on two occasions, in 1987 and 1988.

In 1995, The New England Franchise (Lowell, Massachusetts) Hosted the National Tournament of Champions.

1996 U.S. Olympic team captain Lawrence Clay-Bey won several super heavyweight titles at Lowell in the mid-1990s as did future No-1 contender (IBF) super bantamweight Mike "Machine Gun" Oliver.

In the 2000s pro boxer Danny O'Connor was a 4 time New England Golden Gloves Champion.

In the 2000s pro boxer "Too Smooth" Matt Godfrey was a New England Golden Gloves Champion as was his friend and stablemate, 2004 U.S. Olympian Jason Estrada.

In 2002 & 2004–2006, pro heavyweight "The Storm" Nathaniel James was 3 time New England Golden Gloves Champion.

=== List of National Winners from New England ===
- 1962- 112 lbs: Ray Jutrus
- 1969- 165 lbs: Roosevelt Molden
- 1974- 178 lbs: Robert Stewart
- 1993- 165 lbs: Tarvis Simms
- 2000- Shw: Steve Vukosa
- 2001- 130 lbs: Henry Jr. Ponciano
- 2002- 165 lbs: Jaidon Codrington & 201 lbs: Matthew Godfrey
- 2006- 152 lbs: Demetrius Andrade & 165 lbs: Edwin Rodriquez
- 2007- 152 lbs: Demetrius Andrade
- 2008- 112 lbs: Jorge Aiague & 141 lbs: Daniel O'Connor
- 2010- 123 lbs: Toka Kahn-Clary & 165 lbs: Ronald Ellis
- 2011- 123 lbs: Tramaine Williams
