= Cummiskey =

Cummiskey is a surname. Notable people with the surname include:

- Chris Cummiskey (born 1964), American politician from Arizona
- David R. Cummiskey (born 1940), American politician
- Edward Cummiskey (1954–1976), New York mobster who served as a mentor to Jimmy Coonan, leader of the Westies
- Gary Cummiskey (born 1963), South African poet and publisher
- Hugh Cummiskey (1789–1871), Irish-born settler of Lowell, Massachusetts, United States
- James Cummiskey (1850–1925), Canadian merchant and political figure on Prince Edward Island, Canada
