= Lowell High School (Massachusetts) =

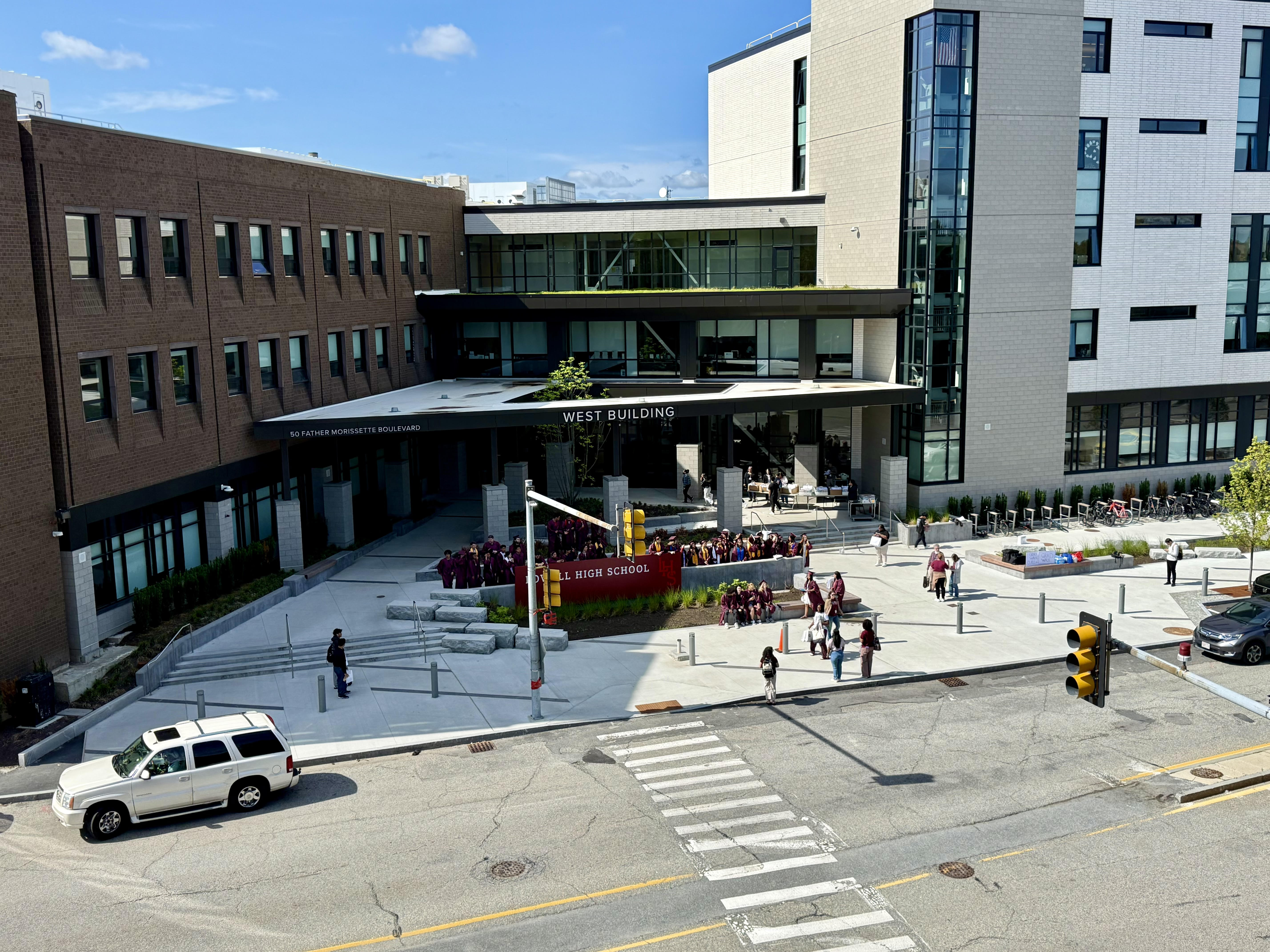
- West Building main entrance of Lowell High School, June 2025

Location
- 50 Father Morissette Boulevard; Lowell, Massachusetts 01852; United States

Information
- Type: Public
- Established: 1831
- School district: Lowell Public Schools
- Superintendent: Liam Skinner
- NCES School ID: 250702001041
- Headmaster: Michael Fiato
- Teaching staff: 234.43 (FTE)
- Enrollment: 3,402 (2023–2024)
- Student to teacher ratio: 14.51
- Colors: Maroon and gray
- Athletics conference: Merrimack Valley Conference (MVC)
- Nickname: Red Raider
- Website: https://lhs.lowell.k12.ma.us/

Lowell High School is a public high school located in downtown Lowell, Massachusetts, United States. The school is a part of Lowell Public Schools. The school mascot is the Red Raider, and the colors are maroon and gray. Current enrollment is over 3,500 students.

== History ==
Lowell, Massachusetts was incorporated as a town in 1826 and Lowell High School opened shortly after in 1831. One of its earliest homes was a small brick building on Middlesex Street owned by the Hamilton Manufacturing Company. Lowell High School was the first and remains the oldest desegregated public high school in the United States; African American Caroline Van Vronker was a student at Lowell High School in 1843, when every other public high school in the United States was segregated.

In 1840, the high school moved into a new building between Kirk Street and Anne Street along the Merrimack Canal. Over the next 100 years, the school campus expanded. The oldest extant building replaced the 1840s building in 1893. In 1922, a large new building was built along Kirk Street to French Street. In the 1980s, another building was built on the opposite side of the Merrimack Canal with connecting walkways over the canal.

In 2020, the City of Lowell began a massive redevelopment of the campus. Additions included the complete renovation of the Main and French Street buildings, the demolition of the existing 80s-era gymnasium, and the construction of a new gym and five-story academic building intended for freshman use connected to the main campus.

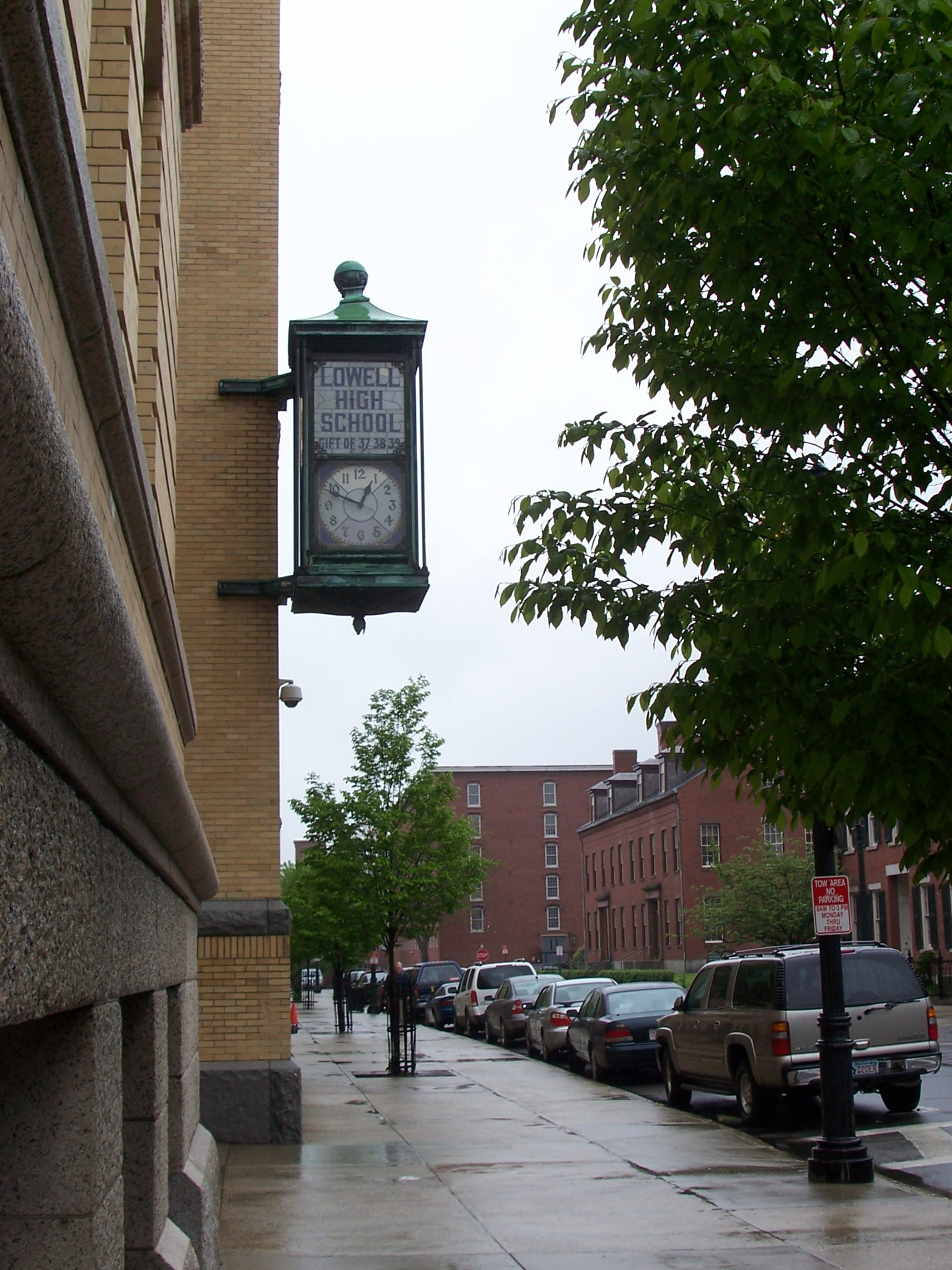
Lowell High School Clock, a gift from three classes, is frequently used as a symbol of the school (2007).

== Notable alumni ==
- Charles Herbert Allen (1865), congressman; governor of Massachusetts
- James Cook Ayer (1838), manufacturer, wealthiest patent medicine businessman of his day
- George D. Behrakis (1951), founder of Dooner Laboratories, later purchased Muro Pharmaceuticals, Inc.
- Milton Bradley (1854), largest game manufacturer in the US
- Benjamin Franklin Butler (1830s), congressman; governor of Massachusetts
- George Whitefield Chadwick (1871), composer
- Rosalind Elias (1947), opera singer
- Gustavus Fox (1830s), assistant secretary of the Navy during the Civil War
- John Galvin Jr. (1983), professional football player
- Frederic Thomas Greenhalge (1859), congressman; governor of Massachusetts
- Lynn Gunn (2012), musician, frontwoman of band PVRIS
- Sam Okuayinonu (2016), NFL player
- Mary Hallaren (1925), director of Women's Army Corps
- Tom Hayes (1978), businessman and author
- Helen Sawyer Hogg (1921), astronomer
- Deborah Hopkinson (1969), author
- Jujubee (2002), drag queen, contestant on Rupaul's Drag Race
- Jack Kerouac (1939), author of On the Road, The Dharma Bums
- Ted Leonsis (1973), former AOL president; founder and CEO of Monumental Sports & Entertainment
- Alice Parker Lesser, lawyer, suffragist
- Roger J. Landry, former Attache to the Mission of the Holy See to the United Nations and current National Director of the Pontifical Mission Societies in the United States
- Elinor Lipman (1968), author of The Boston Globe
- Ed McMahon (1940), entertainer
- Marty Meehan (1974), Democratic congressman; president of the University of Massachusetts system
- F. Bradford Morse (1938), Republican congressman
- William Henry O'Connell (1877), cardinal of Archdiocese of Boston
- Elizabeth Ordway (1846), teacher; early advocate for women's suffrage in Washington territory;one of the first group of young women recruited to become teachers in pioneer Seattle in the 1860s.
- John Jacob Rogers, Republican congressman
- Tom Sexton (1958), author
- Ezekiel A. Straw (1830s), governor of New Hampshire
- Billy Sullivan (1933), owner of an original franchise, the Boston Patriots, of the American Football League
- Johnny Thomson, race car driver, 1959 Indianapolis 500 pole sitter
- Paul Tsongas (1958), Democratic congressman; senator
- Micky Ward (1991), professional boxer and philanthropist
- Edgar A. Wedgwood (1874), adjutant general of the Utah National Guard
- Helen Augusta Whittier (1862), president of Whittier Textile Company, educator, suffragist
- Esther Wilkins, dental pioneer, author of Clinical Practice of the Dental Hygienist
