= American Association of Textile Chemists and Colorists =

US not-for-profit professional association

The American Association of Textile Chemists and Colorists

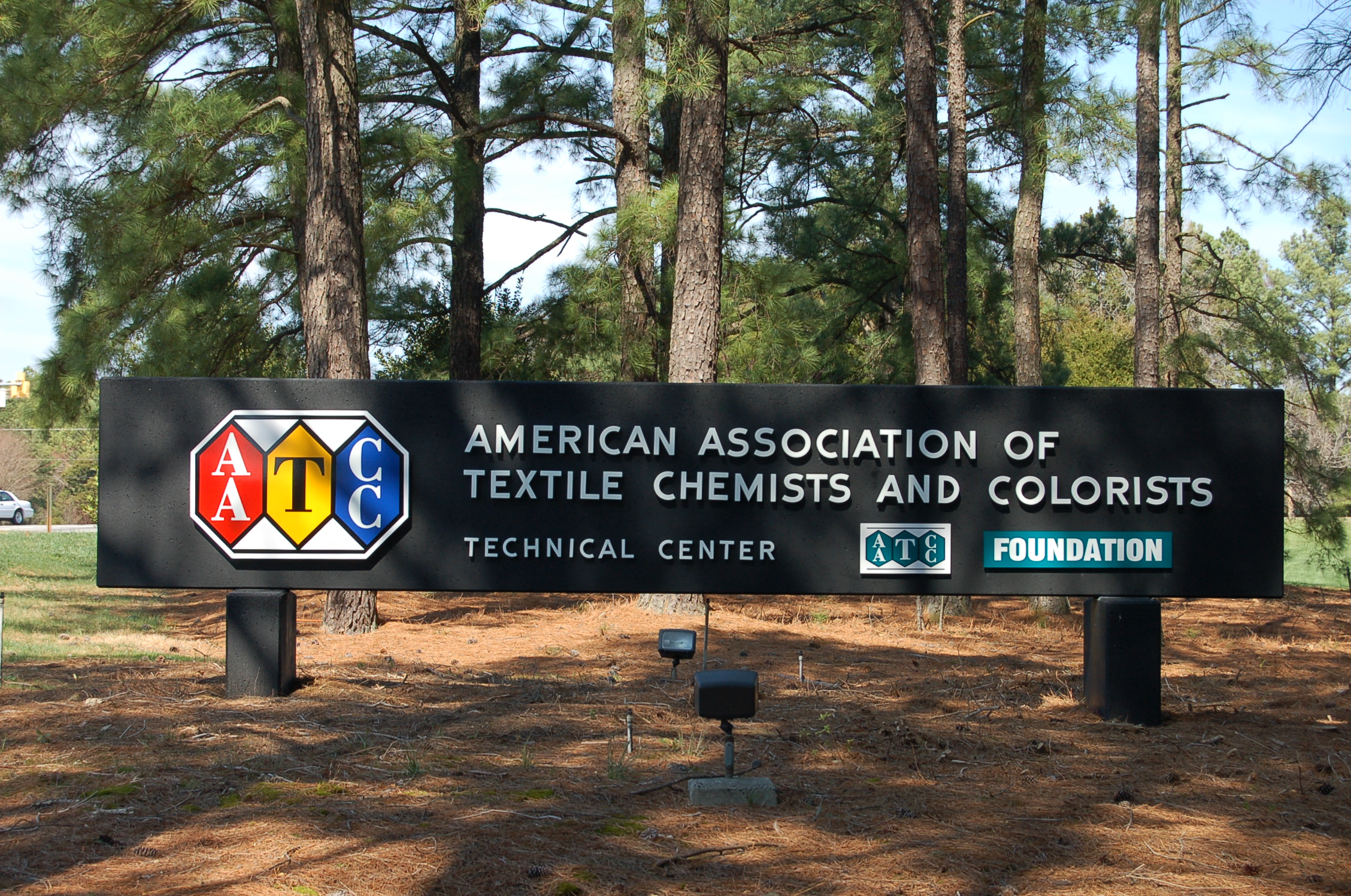
- AATCC Technical Center Sign
- Founded: 1921
- Founder: Dr. Louis Atwell Olney, professor, Lowell Technological Institute
- Type: Professional Association
- Purpose: Textile, Color, Test Methods, Quality Control
- Location: Research Triangle Park, North Carolina
- Region served: Worldwide
- Website: aatcc.org

AATCC—the American Association of Textile Chemists and Colorists— is a 501(c)(6) not-for-profit professional association that provides test method development, quality control materials, educational development, and networking for textile and apparel professionals throughout the world.

The American Association of Textile Chemists and Colorists (AATCC) develop the test methods the textile industry use to ensure product quality. AATCC is the world's leading not-for-profit association serving textile professionals since 1921. AATCC, headquartered in Research Triangle Park, Durham, N.C., USA, provides test method development, quality control materials, and professional networking for thousands of members throughout the world.

== Activities ==
AATCC has developed more than 200 textile-related standards, including test methods, evaluation procedures, and monographs. These standards are published each year in the AATCC Technical Manual. All standards are developed and updated by volunteer members, through research committees. All industry stakeholders may participate in the standards-development process.

Before a standard is published in the AATCC Technical Manual, it must be unanimously approved by voting members of the responsible research committee and the Technical Committee on Research (TCR). During the first three years, each new standard is reviewed annually, at which time, on recommendation of the research committee and approval by TCR, it may be reaffirmed, revised, or withdrawn. After the first three years, each standard is reviewed at least every five years. The content of many AATCC methods form the basis of equivalent ISO methods.

AATCC serves as secretary for the US Technical Advisory Committee (TAG) to the American National Standards Institute (ANSI) for International Organization for Standardization (ISO) textile test method development. (For many years, AATCC was also secretary of ISO TC38 SC1 and SC2.)

AATCC provides test method training at its laboratories, at members’ facilities, online, and in more than 10 countries around the globe. AATCC also offers test method proficiency programs and quality control products for use in conducting its test methods.

AATCC publishes a bi-monthly magazine, AATCC Review, containing technical articles, feature articles, and news for textile professionals. The Association also publishes the AATCC Journal of Research, a bi-monthly online peer-reviewed research journal with a broad scope. The AATCC News, a newsletter published twice per month, is distributed by e-mail. Other publications include a website, AATCC Blog, books, and training videos.

The association conducts educational programs, such as workshops, seminars, conferences, webinars, and online instruction, on various aspects of textiles. Proficiency programs are available for labs to participate in.

Each year, AATCC honors outstanding members and the greater textile community with many awards, including the Olney Medal for outstanding achievement in textile chemistry. The Millson Award for Invention recognizes outstanding contributions to textile technology, the Harold C. Chapin Award is presented for exemplary service to AATCC, and the J. William Weaver Paper of the Year Award goes to the authors of the best peer-reviewed manuscript published in AATCC Journal of Research during the year. Students are eligible to participate and compete in several awards and competitions, including the C2C Student Design Competition, C2C Student Merchandising Competition, Herman & Myrtle Goldstein Student Paper Competition, Student Chapter Awards, and Outstanding College Graduate of the Year Award. AATCC Foundation Inc., a 501(c)(3) public charitable organization, was established in 1997 and operates independently in the furtherance of the charitable mission of the association by providing scholarships and research grants to undergraduate and graduate students studying textiles and related fields.

AATCC works in collaboration with other textile associations around the world, including The Textile Institute (UK), Federación Latinoamericana de Químicos y Profesionales Textiles (FLAQT) (Latin American Federation of Textile Chemical Professional Associations), La Asociación Argentina de Químicos y Coloristas Textiles (Argentina), the China Textile Information Center (China), and the Associação Brasileira de Químicos e Coloristas Têxteis (Brazil). In addition, AATCC works with ASTM International, INDA (the Nonwovens Association), the Specialty Graphics Imaging Association (SGIA), the Synthetic Yarn and Fiber Association (SYFA), Industrial Fabrics Association International (IFAI), Inter-Society Color Council (ISCC), the National Council of Textile Organizations (NCTO), TAPPI, [TC]^{2}, the Textile Exchange, and the Nonwovens Institute. Together with its counterpart in the United Kingdom, the Society of Dyers and Colourists, AATCC maintains the Colour Index, an international reference database of pigments and dyes.

== Organization ==
Local sections and student chapters are formed by association members located in a particular geographical area. Sections and chapters further the exchange of textile information by arranging local meetings, lectures, and other technical or social activities. Several sections make up a region.

AATCC is administered by a board of directors, including regional representatives who are elected by the members from their region, and Interest Group Chairs and At-Large members, who are elected from their Interest Groups. Eligible members of all regions elect the AATCC President-Elect. After two years, the President-Elect becomes President, who serves two years in that office before becoming Past-President for an additional two-year term (six years total commitment with specific duties and responsibilities for each office). AATCC staff is based at the AATCC Technical Center and provides administrative assistance to the board.

Research committees, made up of volunteer members, are responsible for test method development. Administrative committees, also consisting of volunteer members, are responsible for the various activities of the association.

There are three Interest Groups within AATCC:

The Chemical Applications Interest Group stimulates and expands its members' knowledge base of applying chemicals (preparation aids, colorants, finishes, polymers, etc.) to textile substrates. This includes the technologies, equipment, systems, and processes used, as well as the tested physical/mechanical properties of treated materials.

The Concept 2 Consumer (C2C) Interest Group focuses on the creation of textiles and textile-containing products, from design to retail. C2C activities promote the association to the retail, merchandising, and design communities to increase membership and participation in activities benefiting textile, apparel, and home fashions production.

The Materials Interest Group addresses the latest innovations in fibers and fiber products, including smart textiles, novel fibers, medical/biomedical, and protective textiles. Areas of interest include modifications of existing structures and the creation of unique chemical-, polymer-, and fiber-based materials. The Materials Interest Group concentrates on the science and engineering used to create new materials, along with any technologies, equipment, systems, and processes developed for their commercial production and their tested physical/mechanical properties.

== Membership ==
AATCC has individual, student, and corporate members in areas of the textile industry such as retail quality control, design, and merchandising; textile and apparel manufacturing; textile fiber, dye, chemical, instrument, and machinery manufacturing; testing labs; and academia.

== Publications ==
AATCC Review (and its predecessors) has published textile research and news since 1969. AATCC Review covers fibers to finished products, and chemical synthesis to retail practices. Available in print and online.

AATCC Journal of Research, electronic peer reviewed research journal (now also available in an annual print compilation). This textile research journal has a broad scope: from advanced materials, fibers, and textile and polymer chemistry, to color science, apparel design, and sustainability. Now indexed by Science Citation Index Expanded (SCIE) and discoverable in the Thomson Reuters Web of Science! The Journal’s impact factor is available in Journal Citation Reports.

AATCC News is a free, biweekly newsletter, published since 2004. The newsletter covers recent trends and insights across all aspects of the textile industry.

== History ==
1921

- The need for American textile test methods became apparent during the First World War, when the blockade in the Atlantic prevented European dyes from coming to America, and the fledgling American dye manufacturers struggled with providing consistent products.
- Louis A. Olney was a professor at the Lowell Textile School and is considered the Founder of AATCC. Olney had been a founding member of the American Institute of Chemical Engineers, a member of the American Chemical Society, involved in higher management at several New England mills, and was editor of the Technical Section of American Dyestuff Reporter.
- AATCC was founded at a meeting of 140 men on November 3, 1921, at the Engineer's Club in Boston, Massachusetts
- Local sections of the Association began forming immediately after AATCC was formed.
- Proceedings of the Association's activities were carried in American Dyestuff Reporter until AATCC launched Textile Chemist & Colorist in 1969.
- AATCC was housed at the Lowell Textile School until 1963.

1923

- AATCC published its first four color fastness test methods in 1923.

1964

- AATCC built and moved into the Technical Center in Research Triangle Park, North Carolina in 1964.

1965

- AATCC began conducting test method training programs in 1965. Durable press testing was the most popular training initially offered at the Technical Center.

1966

- AATCC symposia began in 1966 at hotels and other venues throughout the US. What to Test for Durable Press was the first AATCC symposium, held in Washington, D.C. in March 1966. A Flock Technology Symposium was held in Washington, D.C. in December 1967.

1969

- AATCC first published Textile Chemist & Colorist in January 1969. The cover of the first issue featured a photomicrograph of hand-drawn polypropylene filament.

1996

- AATCC launched www.aatcc.org in 1996.

1997

- In 1997, AATCC launched a public charitable arm, AATCC Foundation Inc. The Foundation provides scholarships and grants for textile education and research.

1999

- In 1999, AATCC purchased American Dyestuff Reporter.
- AATCC also began exhibiting at international trade shows in 1999.

2000

- In 2000, AATCC established a Mexican office and conducted test method training in Mexico. The satellite office has since been closed.

2001

- In 2001, AATCC combined Textile Chemist & Colorist and American Dyestuff Reporter into AATCC Review and received its first of many Apex Awards for Publications Excellence.

2002

- AATCC Proficiency Testing Programs were launched in 2002. The Membership Directory went online for easy use by all members that same year.
- In 2002, the first major renovation of Technical Center included new ceilings and lighting, a new HVAC system and boiler, refurbished lab counters and cabinets, and a new roof. The renovations spanned a two-year period.

2003

- AATCC launched International Test Method Training Programs in 2003, beginning in India. The program now includes 30 trainers in 13 countries.
- Test method training CDs were launched in 2003.

2004

- AATCC began offering its UV Calibration Program in 2004.
- In 2004 AATCC made major changes to its Constitution, transitioning the 50-plus member governing Council to an approximate 20-member Board of Directors. Three interest groups—Chemical Applications, Concept 2 Consumer, and Materials —were also created and incorporated into the governance. .
- The online Buyer's Guide and downloadable test methods were introduced to the website in 2004.
- For the first time in 2004, AATCC co-located the International Conference with the American Textile Machinery International (ATME-I) show in Greenville, S.C.
- In October 2004, the first issue of the online newsletter AATCC News was published.
- In November 2004, sale of the AATCC Technical Manual in a searchable CD format was approved.
- In that same year, AATCC agreed to be one of the four sponsoring organizations for the online peer-reviewed Journal of Engineered Fibers and Fabrics (JEFF).

2005

- AATCC purchased the Computer Integrated Textile Design Association (CITDA) in 2005 and launched the C2C Student Design Competition.
- The Indian Section, centered around Mumbai, became the first local AATCC section outside the US.
- AATCC made available all journal articles from 1969 to the present available in a searchable, online archive. The journal itself became available in digital as well as printed format.
- The Materials Engineering Competition began in 2005.

2006

- In 2006, an agreement allowed China Textile Leader to translate and reprint articles from AATCC Review.
- A lower priced developing nation membership was developed in 2006, incorporating the digital magazine.
- The China Textile Information Center was contracted to translate the AATCC Technical Manual into Mandarin, print, and sell the manual in China.

2007

- AATCC dedicated the William R. Martin Jr. Walkway at the Technical Center at the end of 2007. Proceeds from inscribed bricks support AATCC Foundation's charitable activities.

2008

- The second international section, the Kongu section, began around Tirupur, India in March 2008. This section was later reabsorbed by the India section.
- AATCC approved an international student chapter at SASMIRA in Mumbai, India in November 2008. The group officially launched in early 2009.
- Web-based Textile Fundamentals modules are offered in conjunction with the College of Textiles at North Carolina State University.
- In 2008, AATCC released Color Vision and Technology. The book was written by Rolf Kuehni and published in CD format.

2009

- AATCC launched another international student chapter at UNMSM in Lima, Peru in 2009.

== Corporate Members ==
Corporate members may be Diamond Members, Platinum Members, Gold Members, or Silver Members. There are also Exchange Members.

== Student AATCC Chapters ==
AATCC student chapters organize activities within their universities or participate in section and Association-wide programs. Students may join AATCC even if a chapter does not exist at their college or university; however, certain scholarships and awards are available only at schools with active student chapters.
