= USS McFarland =

Clemson-class destroyer

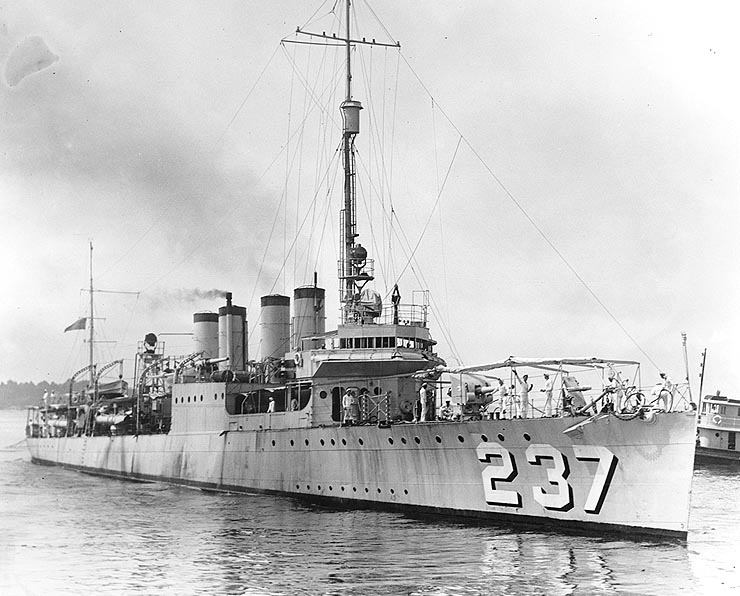
- USS McFarland leaving Philadelphia Naval Yard on 4 August 1932

History

United States
- Name: McFarland
- Namesake: John McFarland
- Builder: New York Shipbuilding
- Laid down: 31 July 1918
- Launched: 30 March 1920
- Commissioned: 30 September 1920
- Decommissioned: 8 November 1945
- Stricken: 19 December 1945
- Fate: Sold for scrap, 29 October 1946

General characteristics
- Class & type: Clemson-class destroyer
- Displacement: 1,190 tons
- Length: 314 ft 5 in (95.8 m)
- Beam: 31 ft 8 in (9.7 m)
- Draft: 9 ft 3 in (2.8 m)
- Propulsion: 26,500 shp (19,800 kW); Geared turbines, 2 screws
- Speed: 35 knots (65 km/h; 40 mph)
- Range: 4,900 nmi (9,100 km; 5,600 mi) at 15 knots (28 km/h; 17 mph)
- Complement: 122 officers and enlisted
- Armament: 4 × 4 in (102 mm) guns; 1 × 3 in (76 mm) gun; 4 × triple 21 in (533 mm) torpedo tube mounts

USS McFarland (DD-237/AVD-14) was a Clemson-class destroyer in the United States Navy during World War II. She was named for American Civil War sailor and Medal of Honor recipient John McFarland.

McFarland was laid down on 31 July 1918 and launched on 30 March 1920 by the New York Shipbuilding Corporation; sponsored by Miss Louisa Hughes; and commissioned on 30 September 1920.

== Service history ==
McFarland, having served a month with the Atlantic Fleet, departed for European waters on 30 November 1920. For the next two months she operated in the English Channel, sailing for Gibraltar on 31 January 1921. On 9 March she arrived at Split for a four-month tour with the Adriatic Detachment. In July she continued eastward, and at Constantinople, on 31 July, joined ships of the Turkish Waters Detachment.

Returning to the United States only once (8 July to 22 October 1922), McFarland remained in the Black Sea and eastern Mediterranean area until spring 1923. During that period she performed quasi-diplomatic and humanitarian roles necessitated by the aftermath of World War I. She cruised regularly to Black Sea and Anatolian ports, distributing American relief supplies to Russian, Greek, and Turkish refugees and providing transportation, mail, and communications facilities.

McFarland returned to New York and on 15 September 1923 joined the Scouting Fleet at Newport, Rhode Island. With only two interruptions, she operated along the East coast and in the Caribbean for the next 17 years. The first interruption came with a cruise to Hawaii for the 1925 fleet problem involving an attack on Oahu; the second, a year out of commission, in reserve, at Philadelphia, 1931. On 2 August 1940, McFarland, undergoing conversion, was redesignated AVD-14, seaplane tender (destroyer). On 5 October she was recommissioned in full and assigned to the Pacific Fleet.

=== 1923 collision ===
McFarland was heavily damaged during the early morning of 19 September 1923 after being rammed on the port side forward of her bridge by the battleship Arkansas during night maneuvers off of the Cape Cod Canal. The training exercise was being undertaken by Arkansas, the battleship Florida, the auxiliary ship Antares and a flotilla of a dozen destroyers. McFarland was towed to Boston Navy Yard by the destroyer Sturtevant.

=== World War II ===
On 7 December 1941, McFarland, operating out of Pearl Harbor, was conducting antisubmarine maneuvers off Maui. Receiving word of the Japanese attack, she patrolled to the southwest, returning to Oahu on 9 December. For the next seven months she operated from Pearl Harbor, completing several voyages to Palmyra Atoll and Johnston Islands. On these missions she carried Marine reinforcements to the islands and returned with civilian personnel.

McFarland sailed for the South Pacific 2 June 1942. She arrived at Noumea on 16 June and within a month she made her first contact with an enemy submarine in Bulari Pass, 15 July. In August, as the Guadalcanal offensive neared, she assumed tender duties in the Espiritu Santo – Santa Cruz Islands area. Assigned to keeping the supply lines open, McFarland carried supplies to the embattled island and evacuated wounded marine personnel while the planes she tendered performed scouting and fighting missions.

On 16 October, McFarland was unloading cargo and embarking wounded personnel in Lunga Roads when she was attacked by nine dive bombers. While the first seven scored no hits, the eighth hit a gasoline barge in tow alongside the tender's starboard quarter. The blazing barge was cut loose as the ninth plane made its run. At least one bomb hit McFarland's stern, knocking out her rudder and steering engine. Her crew shot down one plane, but lost eleven of its members in the fight; five killed, six missing, with an additional 12 critically wounded. For this action, the ship was awarded the first ever US Navy Presidential Unit Citation.

McFarland was towed to Florida Island, where she moored to the beach in the upper channel (later called McFarland Channel) of Tulagi harbor. She completed makeshift repairs to her hull by 26 November and sailed to Espiritu Santo, where further repairs increased her seaworthiness. On 17 December she began to make her way back to Pearl Harbor, arriving on 29 December.

Repairs completed by 17 April 1943, McFarland sailed for the west coast. Redesignated DD-237 on 1 December 1943, and homeported at San Diego, California for the remainder of the war, she operated with aircraft carriers as they conducted training exercises and pilot qualification landings. On 30 September 1945, she sailed for the east coast.

Decommissioned at Philadelphia on 8 November 1945, she was struck from the Navy Register on 19 December. Her hulk was sold for scrap on 29 October 1946 to the North American Smelting Company, Philadelphia.

== Awards ==
McFarland received two battle stars for her World War II service.
