= Cumiskey =

Cumiskey is a surname. Notable people with the surname include:

- Frank Cumiskey (1912–2004), American gymnast
- Kyle Cumiskey (born 1986), Canadian ice hockey player
- Thomas B. Cumiskey (1916–2002), American politician from Maryland
- William Cumiskey (fl. 1967–1985), Irish Labour Party politician
