= Roger J. Landry =

American Catholic priest (born 1970)

The Reverend Monsignor Roger J. Landry
- Diocese: Diocese of Fall River
- Previous posts: Catholic student chaplain, Columbia University (2022–2024); Attache to the Mission of the Holy See to the United Nations (2015–2022)

Orders
- Ordination: 26 June 1999 by Sean Patrick O'Malley

Personal details
- Born: 1970 (age 55–56) Lowell, Massachusetts, US
- Profession: National Director, Pontifical Mission Societies in the United States
- Education: Harvard College; Pontifical North American College; Pontifical University of Saint Thomas Aquinas; Pontifical Gregorian University; Pontifical Lateran University; John Paul II Pontifical Theological Institute for Marriage and Family Sciences

Roger J. Landry (born 1970) is an American prelate of the Catholic Church in the Diocese of Fall River in Massachusetts. He has served as the national director of the Pontifical Mission Society in the United States since 2024. The same year he was named a Chaplain of His Holiness and monsignor by Pope Francis. He previously was a Catholic student chaplain at Columbia University from 2022 to 2024 and an attaché to the Permanent Observer of the Holy See to the United Nations from 2015 to 2022. In 2026, he was appointed a member of the Dicastery for Evangelization.

== Biography ==
=== Early life and education ===
Landry was born in 1970 to his parents Roger and Midge Landry in Lowell, Massachusetts. He has an identical twin brother, Scot, along with his younger siblings Greg and Colleen. Landry grew up attending St. Michael Church in Lowell, and graduated from Lowell High School in 1988. Following this he attended Harvard College and studied biology. While an undergraduate, he served as founding editor of a student magazine called Peninsula, which controversially argued that homosexuality was "bad" for individuals and for society, prompting demonstrations on Harvard's campus. Landry also encountered Opus Dei while an undergraduate, receiving spiritual direction and formation from priests of that movement. During the 1992 United States congressional elections he worked as a youth organizer for Republican candidates.

Following his graduation from Harvard in 1993 he entered seminary formation for the Diocese of Fall River, studying philosophy at Mount St. Mary's Seminary in Maryland as well as St. Philip Seminary in Toronto. From 1995 to 1999, Landry was a seminarian in formation at the Pontifical North American College, studying at the Pontifical University of Saint Thomas Aquinas as well as the Pontifical Gregorian University and the Pontifical Lateran University. Landry was profiled by writer Brian Murphy in his 1997 book The New Men, which recounts seminary life at the North American College in Rome. On June 26, 1999, then-bishop of Fall River Seán Patrick O'Malley ordained Landry to the priesthood at the Cathedral of St. Mary of the Assumption.

=== Priesthood ===
Following his ordination, Landry returned to Rome for graduate studies at the John Paul II Pontifical Theological Institute for Marriage and Family Sciences in moral theology and bioethics. During this time he also served as a tour guide inside the Vatican Necropolis. In July 2000, Landry was appointed parochial vicar at Espirito Santo Parish in Fall River in addition to part-time chaplain at Bishop Connolly High School. In 2006, Landry was appointed to his first pastorate at St. Anthony of Padua Church in New Bedford as well as the editor of the diocesan newspaper, The Anchor. Beginning in 2015, Landry worked as an attaché at the Permanent Observer of the Holy See to the United Nations, and was appointed a Missionary of Mercy for the Extraordinary Jubilee of Mercy the following year. During his time as attache, he directed the Holy See's intern program and was director of special events.

From 2022 to 2024 he served as Catholic chaplain to Columbia University, and was a chaplain for the Seton Route of the four National Eucharistic Pilgrimages leading up to the 10th National Eucharistic Congress. The Seton Route travelled from New Haven, Connecticut to Indianapolis and Landry was the only chaplain of the four pilgrimages to walk its entirety. During the Columbia University pro-Palestinian campus protests during the Gaza war he stated that the protests were being organized by "explicitly Communist outside agitators". He described the protests as "malevolent" and "antisemitic".

In September 2026, Pope Leo XIV appointed him a member of the Dicastery for Evangelization. Later that same month, the Diocese of Fall River announced that Landry was restricted from public ministry following multiple allegations of misconduct. Landry stated that the allegations concerned "boundary violations between spiritual direction and friendship ... There are no accusations of [any] sexual activity at all."

=== Personal life ===
His identical twin brother, Scot, was born five minutes before him. The two brothers graduated from Lowell High School in 1988 and went on to attend Harvard College and the Pontifical North American College together. Scot graduated from Harvard Business School in 1999 and is now married. He works for the Acton Institute.

Landry is a member of the Priestly Society of the Holy Cross, composed of diocesan priests affiliated with Opus Dei.
