= Tom Sexton (poet) =

American poet

Tom Sexton (1940–2025) was an Alaskan poet and scholar who became the state's Poet Laureate in 1995

== Childhood and education ==
Sexton grew up in Lowell, Massachusetts. After graduating from Lowell High School in 1958, he spent three years in the Army – two of them stationed in Alaska. He then worked odd jobs, before enrolling in Northern Essex Community College in Haverhill, Massachusetts, where he helped found the college's literary magazine Parnassus, a multi-award-winning publication still in print today.

He went on to enter Salem State College, graduating in 1968 with a bachelor's degree in English. He then went to the University of Alaska, where he earned a Master of Fine Arts degree and was hired to help establish the English Department at the newly opened Anchorage Campus.

== Career ==
From 1970 to 1994, Sexton taught English and creative writing at the University of Alaska – Anchorage where he established the creative writing program and served as English Department chair for several years. He was a founding editor of the Alaska Quarterly Review, leaving the magazine when he retired in 1994. He was appointed Alaska's Poet Laureate in 1995, having been selected by the Alaska State Council on the Arts (AKSCA) and confirmed by the Alaskan legislature.

Sexton is the author of ten books of poetry. His A Clock With No Hands is a collection of poems about growing up in Lowell. His most recent book is For the Sake of the Light, which includes "Alaska Spring," a poem that was set to music by American composer Libby Larsen and premiered April 21, 2012 for the 25th anniversary of the Alaska Chamber Singers.

== Personal life ==
Sexton and his wife, Sharyn, spend every other winter in Eastport, Maine.
