= Andrew Comiskey =

American religious supporter of conversion therapy

Andrew Comiskey is an American religious supporter of conversion therapy, as an Evangelical Protestant Christian and later Catholic, and the founder of Desert Stream Ministries, a current group for conversion therapy, that was affiliated with Exodus International, a former group for conversion therapy. He has written several books and given several seminars on his experience with conversion therapy. He is a prominent religious supporter of conversion therapy, and has appeared as a guest on The 700 Club.

== Biography ==
Comiskey was an Evangelical Protestant Christian when he began his religious activism in support of conversion therapy.

Comiskey formed a group for conversion therapy at the Vineyard Church in Santa Monica with the support of the pastor. In 1980, he formed Desert Stream Ministries. In 1981, Comiskey became a pastor in the Vineyard Christian Fellowship. Later, Comiskey and Desert Stream Ministries moved and became part of Vineyard Church in Anaheim, but his association finished when he moved to Kansas City. In the following years, Comiskey continued his work as pastor and leader of Desert Stream Ministries and Living Waters Ministries. He has said that Leanne Payne was a major influence on him. Comiskey has given several seminars and written four books on conversion therapy.

Comiskey married Annette in 1981, with whom he had started the Desert Stream Ministries. The couple went on to have four children.

In April 2011, Comiskey became a Catholic, which was a conversion that was controversial among the Evangelical Protestant Christians that used his material.

== Publications ==
- Freeing the Homosexual, Desert Stream Ministries, 1988, ISBN 0-88419-225-3
- Pursuing Sexual Wholeness: How Jesus Heals the Homosexual, Charisma House 1989, ISBN 0-88419-259-8
- Crosscurrent, Desert Stream Press, 1999, ISBN 1-930159-04-8
- The Kingdom of God & the Homosexual, Desert Stream Ministries, 2000, ISBN 1-930159-02-1
- Strength in Weakness: Overcoming Sexual and Relational Brokenness, InterVarsity press 2003, ISBN 0-8308-2368-9
