= John McFarland (Medal of Honor) =

John C. McFarland
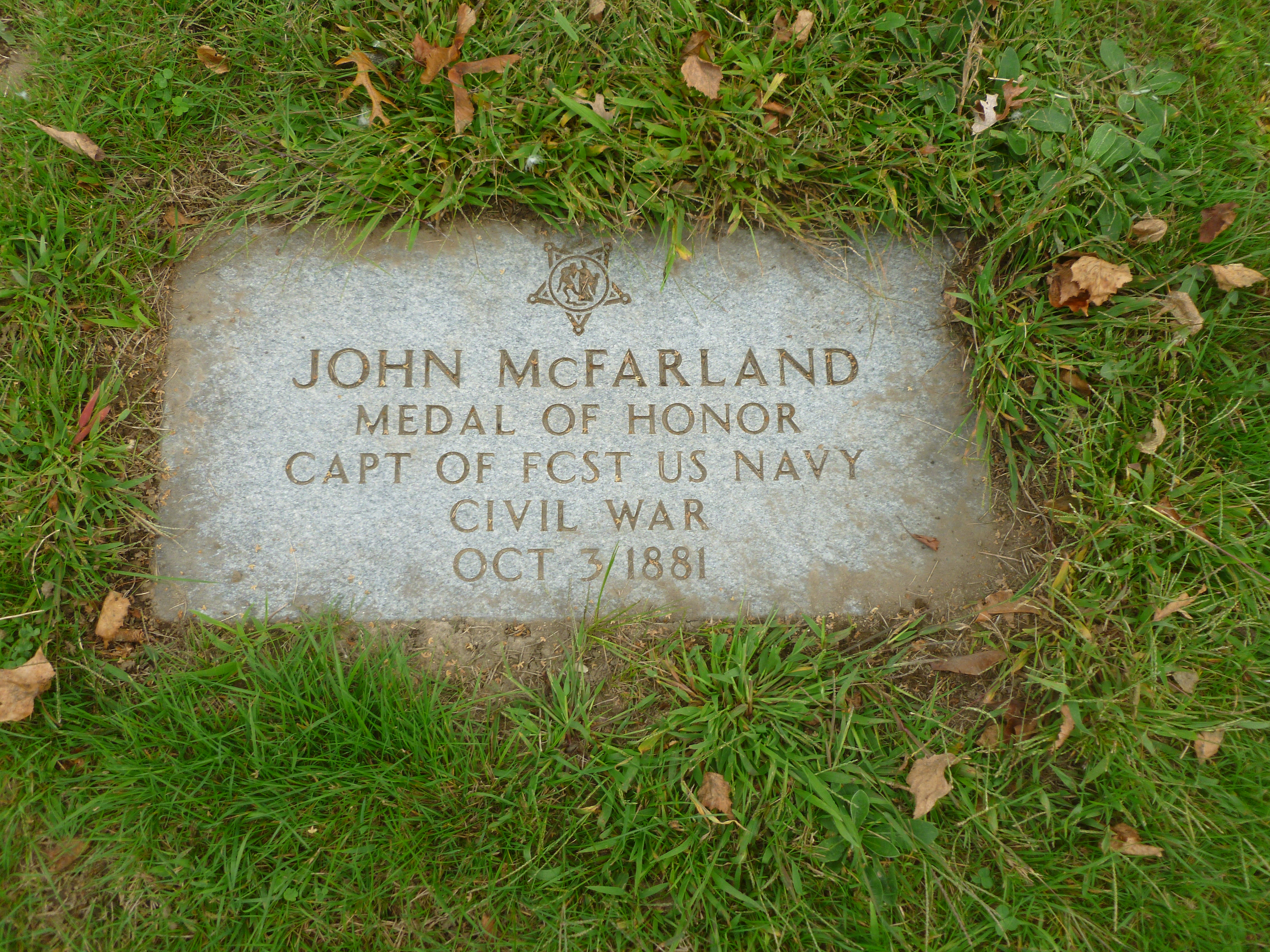
- Gravestone of John McFarland
- Born: 1840; Boston, Massachusetts, US
- Died: October 3, 1881 (aged 40–41); Lowell, Massachusetts, US
- Burial place: Lowell Cemetery; Lowell, Massachusetts
- Military career
- Allegiance: United States of America; Union
- Branch: United States Navy; Union Navy
- Rank: Captain of the Forecastle
- Units: USS Ohio (1820); USS Hartford (1858)
- Conflicts: American Civil War; *Battle of Mobile Bay
- Awards: Medal of Honor

John C. McFarland (1840 – October 3, 1881) was a sailor in the United States Navy and a recipient of the Medal of Honor for his actions in the Battle of Mobile Bay during the American Civil War.

== Biography ==
McFarland entered the Navy at Boston, Massachusetts on December 24, 1861, as seaman on USS Ohio (1820), later transferring to USS Hartford in the West Gulf Blockading Squadron. Rated captain of the forecastle, he had the station at the wheel in every engagement in which Hartford participated. During the Battle of Mobile Bay 4 and August 5, 1864. McFarland left his sickbed to take up station, keeping the wheel of Admiral David Farragut's flagship throughout the storm of shell and shot. He was commended by his commanding officers for his fortitude and intelligence and was awarded the Medal of Honor for his gallant and meritorious service.

McFarland died on October 3, 1881, at the age of 41. He is buried on Lowell Cemetery in Lowell, Massachusetts.

== Namesake ==
USS McFarland (DD-237) was named for him.

== Medal of Honor citation ==

Rank and Organization:

Captain of the Forecastle, U.S. Navy. Born: 1840, Boston, Mass. Accredited to: Massachusetts. G.O. No.: 45, December 31, 1864.

Citation:

Stationed at the wheel on board the flagship U.S.S. Hartford during successful action against Fort Morgan, rebel gunboats and the ram Tennessee in Mobile Bay, on 5 August 1864. With his ship under terrific enemy shellfire, McFarland performed his duties with skill and courage and, when the Lackawanna ran into his ship and every man at the wheel was in danger of being crushed, remained steadfast at his station and continued to steer the ship.

== See also ==
- List of Medal of Honor recipients
- List of American Civil War Medal of Honor recipients: M–P
