= Alice Parker Lesser =

American lawyer

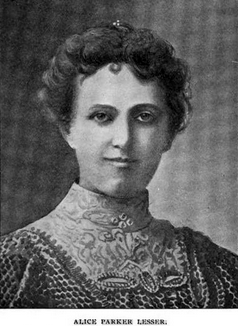
- Alice Parker Lesser, from an 1897 publication.
- Born: Alice Parker; April 21, 1863; Lowell, Massachusetts, U.S.
- Died: October 30, 1939 (aged 76)
- Occupations: Attorney, Suffragist
- Spouses: Josephus Mona Lesser (m. 1895; died 1902) Roger Hutchins (m. 1914)

Alice Parker Lesser (April 21, 1863 – October 30, 1939) was an American lawyer, suffragist, and clubwoman based in Boston, Massachusetts.

== Early life and education ==
Alice Parker was born in 1863 (some sources give 1862 or 1864), in Lowell, Massachusetts, the only child of Dr. Hiram Parker and Annie G. Trafton Parker. She graduated from Lowell High School and moved to California in 1885 for her health. She passed the bar examination in San Francisco in 1888, after studying independently and with the lawyer who would become her husband; in 1890, she became the third woman admitted to the bar in Massachusetts.

== Career ==
Alice Parker began her law practice in Boston in 1890. A trial lawyer and general practitioner, in the 1890s she used her legal knowledge (something extremely rare for a woman of that era to possess) for the benefit of women. She lectured and published a series of articles in the “Home Journal” of Boston under the title of “Law for my Sisters”, by which she explained to women the law of marriage, widows, breach of promise, wife’s necessaries, life insurance on divorce, sham marriages, and names. She also authored many amendments to the Massachusetts legislature affecting property rights of women. She was president of Portia, an organization of women lawyers and law students in Boston, and also president of Pentagon, a social organization for professional women. She was a member of the Women Lawyers' Association and the Massachusetts Federation of Women's Clubs, where she chaired the Committee on Legislation.

Alice Parker Lesser spoke frankly about gender in the legal profession. "I and other women lawyers have lied when we said that we were on an equal basis with men in our profession," she declared to a Boston newspaper in 1912. "Women lawyers can earn money, but not fame... Suffrage is the one cure." She also wrote about the political deprivation of women: "She has been deprived of all civic imagination, all civic knowledge, and all civic responsibility, so far as many could deprive her.... Will there be women who will make good Presidents? That is another question, and one to which I give the ready answer, yes."

Alice Parker Lesser was part of the American delegation to the International Woman Suffrage Alliance congress in 1911, at Stockholm, representing Massachusetts. Later in life, as Alice Parker Hutchins, she was editor of the Women Lawyers' Journal and was based in New York City. After suffrage was achieved, she was active with the League of Women Voters.

== Personal life ==
Alice Parker married fellow lawyer Josephus Mona Lesser in 1895, in New York. She was widowed when he died in 1902, after a head injury sustained in a fall on the Boston courthouse steps. She remarried in 1914, to Roger Hutchins. She died in 1939, aged 76 years.
