= John Galvin (linebacker) =

American football player (born 1965)

No. 51, 52, 90
- Position: Linebacker

Personal information
- Born: July 9, 1965 (age 61); Lowell, Massachusetts, U.S.
- Listed height: 6 ft 3 in (1.91 m)
- Listed weight: 226 lb (103 kg)

Career information
- High school: Lowell
- College: Boston College
- NFL draft: 1988: 11th round, 287th overall pick

Career history
- New York Jets (1988); Minnesota Vikings (1989); New York Jets (1990–1991)

Career NFL statistics
- Fumble recoveries: 2
- Stats at Pro Football Reference

John Blake Galvin Jr. (born July 9, 1965) is an American former professional football player who was a linebacker for the New York Jets and Minnesota Vikings of the National Football League (NFL) from 1988 to 1991. He played college football for the Boston College Eagles and was selected by the Jets in the 11th round of the 1988 NFL draft.

== Early life ==
Galvin was born July 9, 1965, in Lowell, Massachusetts, and played football for Lowell High School from 1979 to 1983.

== College career ==
Galvin attended Boston College under head coach Jack Bicknell as a four-year letterman from 1984 to 1987, and graduated with a degree in speech communications.

- In 1984, Galvin's freshman year, Heisman Trophy winner Doug Flutie led the '84 BC Eagles to a great 10–2 season topped with the "Miracle in Miami", and a win in the Cotton Bowl Classic.
- In 1985, his sophomore year, BC went 4–8.
- In 1986, his junior year, the team went 9–3, and a win over Georgia in the Hall of Fame Bowl.
- In 1987, Galvin's senior year, the Eagles went 5–6, and was one of four players drafted to the NFL, including teammates; Bill Romanowski, Dave Widell and Dave Nugent.

In week 8 of Galvin's senior year, he ripped into the 14th ranked Tennessee Volunteers offense with 8 tackles, 1 sack, and an interception, as BC upset the Vols 20–18.

== Professional career ==
Galvin was an NFL Special Teams stiff:

- In his rookie, 1988 season with the New York Jets, he racked up 25 special teams tackles (3rd on the team).

As his old teammate Doug Flutie was heading into town with the rest of the New England Patriots in November, 1988, Galvin was quoted by the New York Times reporter Gerald Eskenazi;

...The way John Galvin talked about Doug Flutie, the little guy the Jets will face Sunday seemed almost human.

He's not the player he was in college, said Galvin, who played with Flutie at Boston College. He took over a game in college. Sometimes I didn't even know if he needed the rest of the team.

This anticipation that something spectacular can happen at any moment has surrounded Flutie in the pros.

Galvin should know. He was in the Orange Bowl, where Flutie outdueled Bernie Kosar and threw a 48-yard touchdown pass to Gerald Phelan as time expired for a 47–45 victory over Miami...

The Jets kept New England scoreless in the first half, but eventually lost 14–13.

- In his one year with the Minnesota Vikings in 1989, he had 7 special teams tackles.

The New York Times describes Galvin's trade back to the Jets for the 1990 season;

Galvin a Jet Again John Galvin, a linebacker who was a special-teams player for the Jets in 1988, rejoined the club Saturday after he was waived by the Minnesota Vikings, with whom he spent last season. Galvin played for Boston College for four years, and wound up there as the starting right outside linebacker. That is a position that has proved hardest to fill for the Jets this summer. The club's new linebacker coach is Monte Kiffin, who coached Galvin last year with the Vikings. Galvin's immediate role will probably will be on special teams and as a backup linebacker.

- In 1990, he led the New York Jets team with 21 coverage tackles, with a season high of 4 tackles in week 1 vs. Cincinnati Bengals, and earned the game ball in week 15 vs. New England Patriots with 3 tackles.
- In Galvin's 1991 season with the Jets, he played in 9 games, and recorded one fumble recovery.

In his 4-year, 52-game NFL career, he had two fumble recoveries.

== Later life ==
In 1993, Galvin was inducted into the Lowell High School's Athletic Hall of Fame.

In the mid-2000s, Galvin started "Lowell Junior High Football", a free football program for pre-high schoolers, in the Lowell area, who were above the size cutoff or could not afford to play in the other leagues.

According to the Lowell Sun's March 2, 2010 article by Christopher Scott; In the Winter of 2010, Galvin was asked to be one of eleven member committee to choose the next Lowell High School football head coach.
