= Louis Olney =

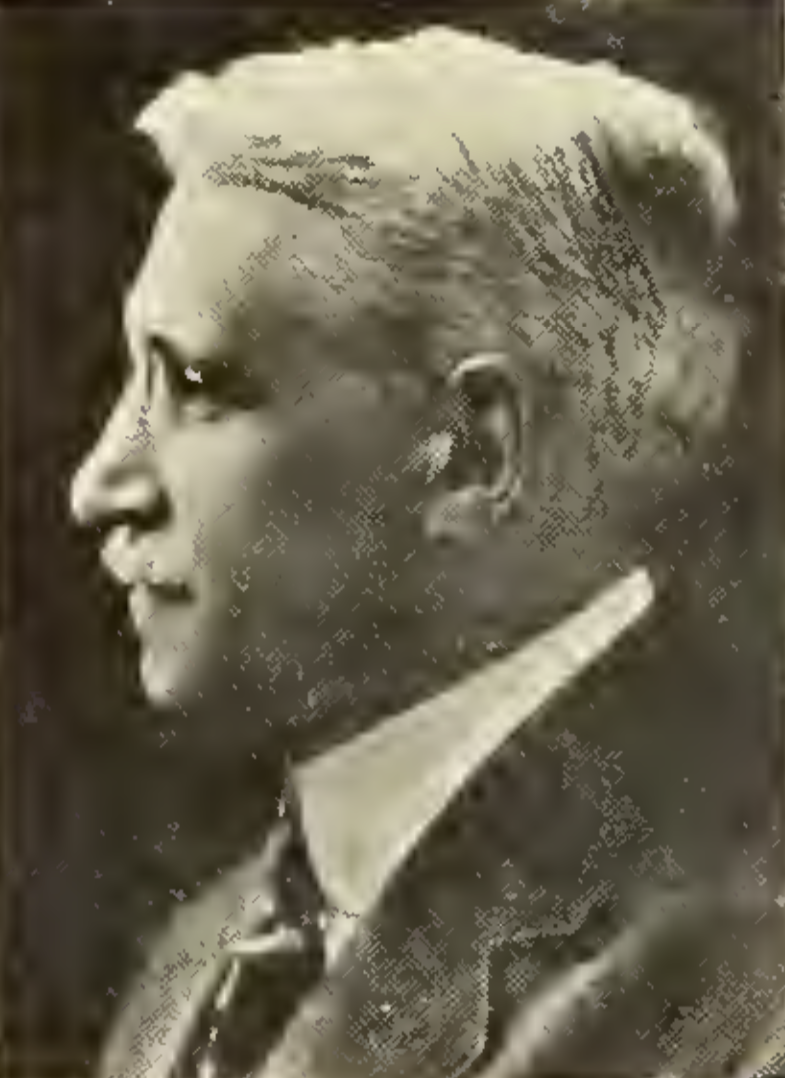
Louis Olney as the Head of Chemistry and Dyeing Departments, Lowell/MA, 1920

Louis Atwell Olney (1875, Providence, Rhode Island, United States – 1949) was a pioneering textile chemist and educator.

He was the founder and first president of the American Association of Textile Chemists and Colorists which in 1944 established the Olney Medal, in his honor, to recognize outstanding achievements in textile or polymer chemistry or other fields of chemistry of major importance to textile science.

== Bibliography ==
- Louis Olney (1927). Elementary organic chemistry. New York: Howes. LCCN 27011737.
- Louis Olney (1909). Textile chemistry and dyeing : a manual of practical instruction in the art of textile bleaching and coloring, and allied processes of treatment; including many useful hints and recipes. Chicago: American School of Correspondence. LCCN 09008904.
