= Edgar A. Wedgwood =

U.S. Army brigadier general

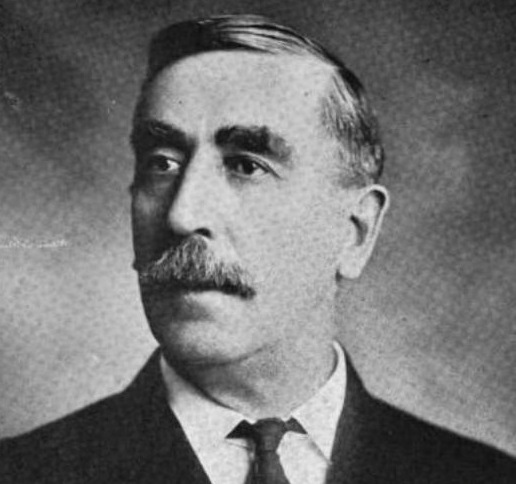
- From 1914's Men of Affairs in the State of Utah: A Newspaper Reference Work
- Born: May 2, 1856; Lowell, Massachusetts, US
- Died: January 31, 1920 (aged 63); Salt Lake City, Utah, US
- Burial place: Mount Olivet Cemetery, Salt Lake City, Utah
- Spouse: Annie M. Shelton (m. 1886–1920, his death)
- Children: 3
- Military career
- Allegiance: United States
- Branch: United States Army
- Service years: 1876–1918
- Rank: Brigadier General
- Commands: Company M, 1st Utah Infantry Regiment; Battery A, Utah Light Artillery; Utah National Guard; 82nd Infantry Brigade, 41st Division; Camp Greene, North Carolina
- Conflicts: Spanish–American War; Philippine–American War; World War I
- Other work: Attorney

Edgar A. Wedgwood (May 2, 1856 – January 31, 1920) was an attorney and National Guard officer prominent in Nebraska and Utah. A veteran of the Spanish–American War, Philippine–American War, and World War I, he was most notable for his service as adjutant general of the Utah National Guard from 1910 to 1917.

A native of Lowell, Massachusetts, Wedgwood moved to Nebraska as a young man and became active in the home building business. Despite being a Democrat in a Republican community, he twice won election as sheriff of Hall County and served from 1885 to 1889. In addition, he served on the city council of Grand Island and as city treasurer of Wood River. While serving as sheriff, Wedgwood studied law, and he was admitted to the bar in 1890.

After becoming an attorney, Wedgwood moved to Utah, practicing law first in Provo and then in Salt Lake City. He was active in charitable and civic causes and served for several years on the state board of bar examiners. A veteran of the National Guard in Nebraska and Utah, Wedgwood served in the United States Army during the Spanish–American War and Philippine–American War, and was wounded during combat in the Philippines. He remained active in the National Guard after returning to the United States and served as adjutant general of the Utah National Guard from 1907 to 1917.

Wedgwood returned to active duty for World War I. Commissioned as a brigadier general, he commanded 82nd Infantry Brigade, 41st Division. Ill health prevented Wedgwood from going to France with his brigade, and he retired from the military and returned to Salt Lake City in early 1918.

After returning to Utah, Wedgwood resumed practicing law. He became ill in early 1920 and died on January 31, 1920. He was buried at Mount Olivet Cemetery in Salt Lake City.

== Early life ==
Edgar Andrew Wedgwood was born in Lowell, Massachusetts on May 2, 1856, a son of Theresa A. (Gould) Wedgwood and Andrew J. Wedgwood, a machinist. He was educated in the public schools of Lowell, and graduated from Lowell High School in 1873.

When Wedgwood was 23, his father relocated the family to Grand Island, Nebraska, and Wedgwood went with him. In addition to assisting on his father's farm, Wedgwood became active in the home building business.

== Start of career ==
Even though he was a Democrat in Hall County, a staunchly Republican community, in 1885 Wedgwood won election as county sheriff. He served for four years, and left office in 1889. While living in Grand Island, Wedgwood served on the city council, and after moving to Wood River, he served as city treasurer. Wedgwood studied law while serving as sheriff, and in November 1890 he was admitted to the bar.

Wedgwood was a member of the Masons, Ancient Order of United Workmen, and Knights of Pythias. He was a devout Baptist, and served his churches as a senior deacon and in other leadership roles. After moving to Utah, Wedgwood was a member of the board of directors for Salt Lake City's Charity Organization Society and a member of the state board of bar examiners.

== Continued career ==
In 1890, Wedgwood was invited to join the Provo, Utah law practice of George Sutherland, and he moved to Utah. Sutherland moved to Salt Lake City in 1893, and Wedgwood entered into a new partnership which included Samuel R. Thurman. After Joseph Lafayette Rawlins and Joseph H. Hurd joined the firm, it was called Rawlins, Thurman, Hurd and Wedgwood. After returning from military service during the Spanish–American War in 1898, Wedgwood moved to Salt Lake City, where he practiced law in partnership with Hurd.

In 1906, Thurman moved to Salt Lake City to resume practicing law with Wedgwood. They took on another partner, A. B. Irvine, and the firm was reorganized as Thurman, Wedgwood & Irvine. When Thurman was elected to the Utah Supreme Court in 1917, Wedgwood and Irvine formed a partnership with Samuel R. Thurman Jr., and the firm was renamed Wedgwood, Irvine & Thurman.

Wedgwood specialized in irrigation law and was recognized as an authority in the field. Among the cases he argued was Snake Creek Mining and Tunnel Company vs. Midway Irrigation Company. The case moved back and forth between state and federal courts over several years and eventually ended with a decision that favored the irrigation company and farmers represented by Wedgwood's firm, but the final resolution of the case came after Wedgwood's death.

== Military service ==
=== Early service ===
While still living in Massachusetts in the 1870s, Wedgwood was one of the organizers of a new National Guard unit, Company C, 6th Massachusetts Infantry. After moving to Nebraska, he helped organize Company H, 1st Nebraska Infantry, in which he remained active until moving to Utah.

Wedgwood continued his military service as a member of the Utah National Guard, serving as a first lieutenant in Company M, 1st Utah Infantry Regiment. By 1898, he was the company commander, and had been promoted to captain.

=== Spanish–American War ===
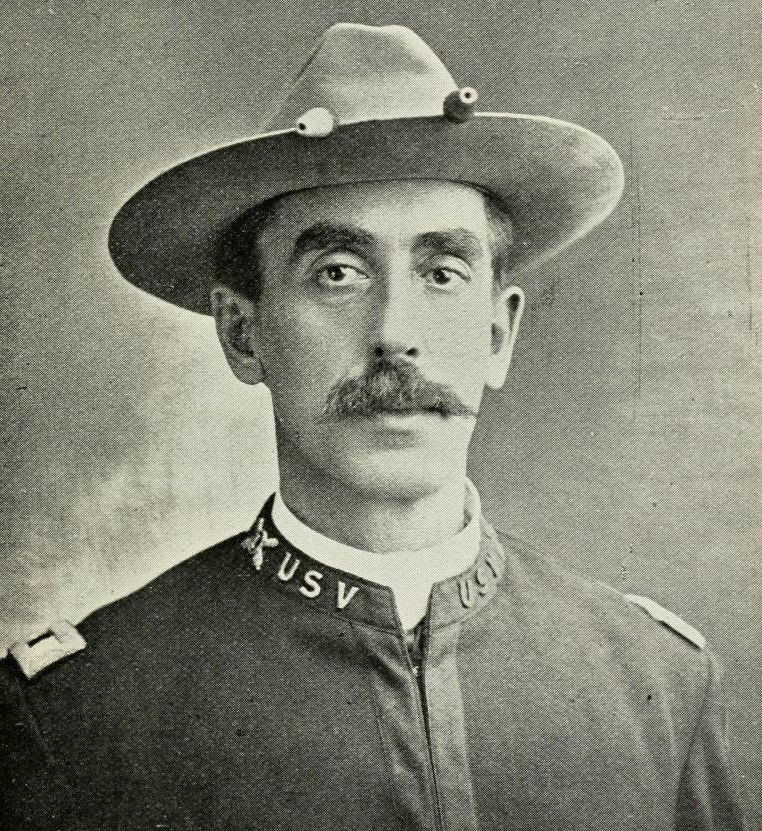
Wedgwood as a captain in 1899

At the start of the Spanish–American War, Wedgwood helped organize Battery B, Utah Light Artillery for federal service, and was chosen as the battery's first lieutenant. He was promoted to captain as commander of Battery A, and served in the Philippines.

Wedgwood participated in more than 20 engagements during the Spanish–American War and the Philippine–American War that followed, and was wounded during the Battle of Quingua. After the war, Salt Lake City-area veterans formed a camp of the United Spanish War Veterans, which they named in Wedgwood's honor.

=== Adjutant general of Utah ===
After returning to Utah in 1899, Wedgwood continued his involvement with the National Guard. Despite being a Democrat in a mostly Republican state and a Baptist in a state dominated by Mormons, in January 1907 he was appointed to a five-year term as adjutant general of Utah by Governor John Christopher Cutler and promoted to the rank of brigadier general. He was reappointed by Governor William Spry, and he served until the completion of his second term in January 1917. In 1913, he was appointed to the federal militia board, the panel that enabled states to participate in planning and activities at the Militia Bureau.

=== World War I ===
In 1917, Wedgwood volunteered for active duty during World War I. He was commissioned as a brigadier general and assigned to Camp Fremont, California as commander of the 82nd Infantry Brigade, a unit of the 41st Division. He organized and trained his brigade at Camp Fremont and at Camp Greene, North Carolina. Because of ill health, Wedgwood was relieved of command when the 41st Division embarked for France in November 1917.

After the 41st Division left for France, Wedgwood remained in command of the Camp Greene military post. He retired on medical grounds in early 1918 and returned to Salt Lake City.

== Later life ==
After returning to Utah, Wedgwood resumed the practice of law in Salt Lake City. He became ill in January 1920, and died in Salt Lake City on January 31, 1920. He was buried at Mount Olivet Cemetery. Wedgwood's death was attributed to neuritis caused by abscessed teeth.

== Family ==
In 1886, Wedgwood married Annie M. Shelton (1860–1941), who was originally from Chicago. They were the parents of two sons, Frederick (died in infancy) and Bruce (1889–1948), and a daughter, Edgarda (1888–1873), the wife of Richard C. Dugdale.

== Sources ==
=== Books ===
- Biographical and Historical Memoirs of Adams, Clay, Hall and Hamilton Counties, Nebraska. Chicago, IL: Goodspeed Publishing Co. 1890 – via HathiTrust.
- City of Lowell (1874). City Documents of the City of Lowell for the Year 1873-74. Lowell, MA: Marden & Rowell – via Internet Archive.
- Davis, Henry Blaine Jr. (1998). Generals in Khaki. Raleigh, NC: Pentland Press. ISBN 978-1-5719-7088-6 – via Google Books.
- Press Club of Salt Lake (1914). Men of Affairs in the State of Utah: A Newspaper Reference Work. Salt Lake City, UT: Western Printing Co. – via Google Books.
- State Bar Association of Utah (1924). Proceedings of the Annual Session. Kaysville, UT: Inland Printing Company – via Google Books.

=== Newspapers ===
- "Supreme Court: Edgar A. Wedgwood". Omaha Daily Bee. Omaha, NE. November 12, 1890 – via Newspapers.com.
- "Utah Officers Appointed". Salt Lake Daily Herald. Salt Lake City, UT. May 5, 1898 – via Newspapers.com.
- "Lieut. Wedgwood Wounded". Salt Lake Herald. Salt Lake City, UT. May 26, 1899 – via Newspapers.com.
- "Will Hold Social Tonight". Salt Lake Herald. Salt Lake City, UT. August 13, 1906 – via Newspapers.com.
- "Commander of Camp Busy Man". The Charlotte News. Charlotte, NC. September 13, 1917 – via Newspapers.com.
- "Another Utahn Made Brigadier". The Salt Lake Tribune. Salt Lake City, UT. September 10, 1918 – via Newspapers.com.
- "Gen. E. A. Wedgwood Dies at His Home After Brief Illness". Deseret Evening News. Salt Lake City, UT. January 31, 1920 – via Newspapers.com.
- "Soldier-Lawyer of Utah is Dead". The Salt Lake Tribune. Salt Lake City, UT. February 1, 1920 – via Newspapers.com.
- "Military Rites for Wedgwood". Salt Lake Herald. Salt Lake City, UT. February 2, 1920 – via Newspapers.com.

Military offices
Preceded by Raymond C. Naylor	Adjutant General of the Utah National Guard; 1907-1917	Succeeded by Hans M. H. Lund
Political offices
Preceded by James Cannon	Sheriff of Hall County, Nebraska; 1885–1889	Succeeded by James A. Costello
