= Ralph Lally =

American boxer

Personal information
- Nationality: (United States) American
- Born: February 12, 1948 Lowell, Massachusetts, U.S.
- Died: December 18, 2011 (aged 63) Dracut, Massachusetts, U.S.
- Height: 5 ft 10 in (178 cm)
- Weight: Welterweight

Boxing career
- Stance: Orthodox

Boxing record
- Win by KO: 67

Ralph Francis Lally (February 12, 1948 – December 18, 2011) was an American Golden Gloves Champion from Lowell, Massachusetts. Lally fought over 75 Golden Gloves bouts throughout the United States and Canada, winning 67 knockouts. He was selected to fight in the Olympics, but was drafted into the Vietnam War.

== Early life ==
Ralph Lally was born in Lowell, Massachusetts, on February 12, 1948, to Eugene W. Lally Sr. and Marguerite (née Kelley). Growing up in a working-class family, he attended Catholic schools in the Lowell area. Lally began his boxing career in the Silver Mittens boxing division in 1962. He fought in the Lowell New England Golden Gloves throughout the 1960s, becoming a local favorite.

== Golden Gloves ==
Lally fought his way throughout the New England area fighting under the Light Heavyweight (175 lbs.) class. He was the 1970 New England Golden Gloves Championship in that class. He was also a member of the New England contingent that went to the Las Vegas Nationals that same year, but lost his bout. Shortly after, he was drafted into the Vietnam War, ending his boxing career.
