= Helen Augusta Whittier =

American editor and lecturer (1846–1925)

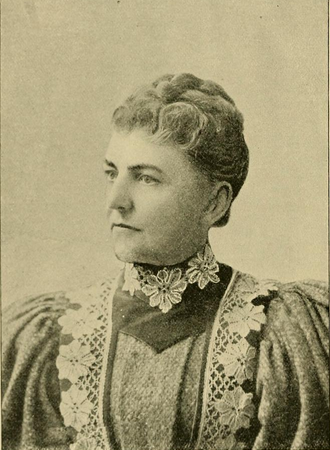
Helen Augusta Whittier

Helen Augusta Whittier (1846–1925) was an American editor, lecturer, and clubwoman. She was a lecturer and teacher of art history, as well as business woman in the textile industry, being the first woman in Lowell, Massachusetts, to run a mill.

== Early life and education ==
Helen Augusta Whittier was born in Lowell, Massachusetts, United States, on December 7, 1846. Her parents were Moses and Lucindia (Blood) Whittier. Helen's ancestors included Thomas Whittier, Aquila Chase, Simon Willard, Thomas Danforth, and John Bridge.

She was educated at Lowell High School and Lasell Seminary, Auburndale, Massachusetts.

== Career ==
From 1888 until 1892, she was the treasurer of the Whittier Cotton Mills in Lowell, and in 1892–1901, served as president. The mill manufactured twine, cords, yarns, and wraps. In 1895, it employed about 250 people.

In 1902–03, Whittier was a teacher of history of art at Bradford Academy.

In 1903, in partnership with May Alden Ward, Whittier founded The Federation Bulletin (monthly), the official national organ of the General Federation of Women's Clubs, and served as its editor and publisher, 1903–10. During the period of 1902–13, she was also the editor and publisher of The Federation Directory of Club Speakers (annual).

Whittier was active in work of women's clubs since 1894. She was the founder and president (1897–1900) of the Middlesex Women's Club of Lowell (600 members). She served as president of Massachusetts State Federation of Women's Clubs, 1904–07; and was a member of its executive board, 1896–1909. She was a director of the New England Women's Club, 1912; State director of the Massachusetts Equal Suffrage Association; a member of the Ex Club of Boston, and a member of the Daughters of the American Revolution.

== Personal life ==
Whittier never married. In religion, she was Unitarian. In politics, she was a Republican. Recreations Interested as an amateur in clay modeling and other lines of art work.
