= Mary Hallaren =

United States Army officer

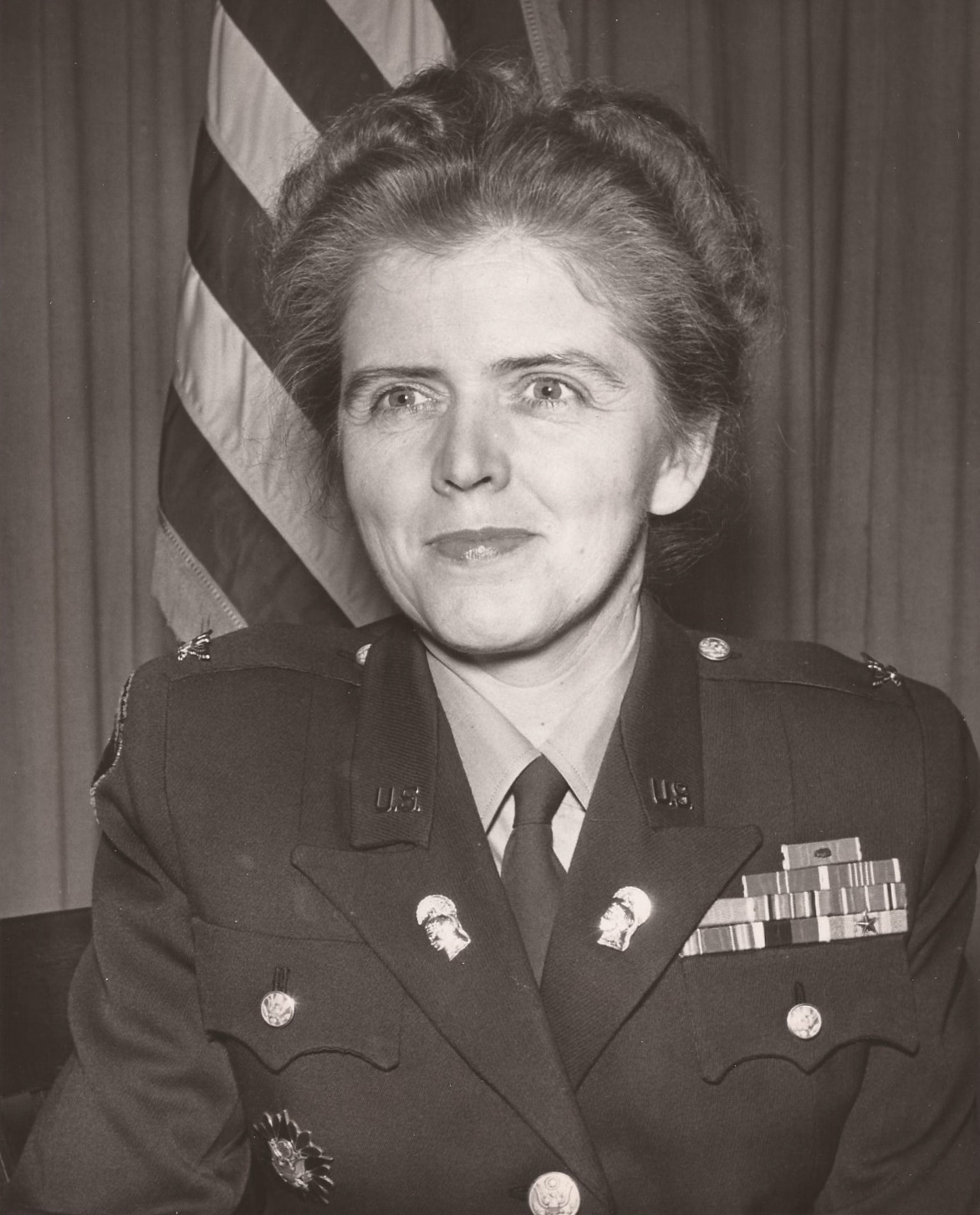
- Born: May 4, 1907; Lowell, Massachusetts, U.S.
- Died: February 13, 2005 (aged 97) McLean, Virginia, U.S.
- Allegiance: United States
- Branch: United States Army
- Rank: Colonel
- Commands: Women's Army Auxiliary Corps
- Awards: Legion of Merit (2); Bronze Star; Army Commendation Medal

Mary Agnes Hallaren (May 4, 1907 – February 13, 2005) was an American soldier and the third director of the Women's Army Corps (WAC) at the time that it became a part of the United States Army. As the director of the WAC, she was the first woman to officially join the U.S. Army.

== Early life ==
Born in Lowell, Massachusetts, the daughter of John Joseph Hallaren and Mary Kenney Hallaren. She graduated in 1925 from Lowell High School and attended Boston University and graduated from Lowell State Teachers College (now University of Massachusetts Lowell). She taught junior high school for 15 years in Lexington, Massachusetts, spending her summers on vigorous walking tours, which she called vagabonding throughout the United States, Mexico, Canada, and Europe.

== Career ==
In 1942 Hallaren entered the Women's Army Auxiliary Corps, which later became the WAC. A recruiter asked the diminutive Hallaren (she barely stood five feet tall), how someone of her size could help the military. She replied, "You don't have to be six feet tall to have a brain that works."

In 1943, as a captain, she commanded the first women's battalion to go overseas. She served as director of WAC personnel attached to the 8th and 9th Air Forces, and by 1945, as a lieutenant colonel, she commanded all WAC personnel in the European theater.

On 7 May 1947, Secretary of War Robert P. Patterson promoted Hallaren to full colonel and appointed her the third director of the WAC. On June 12, 1948, when the WAC was officially integrated into the Army, she became the first woman to serve as a regular Army officer (there had been female members of the Army Medical Corps since 1947). She received Army serial number L–1.

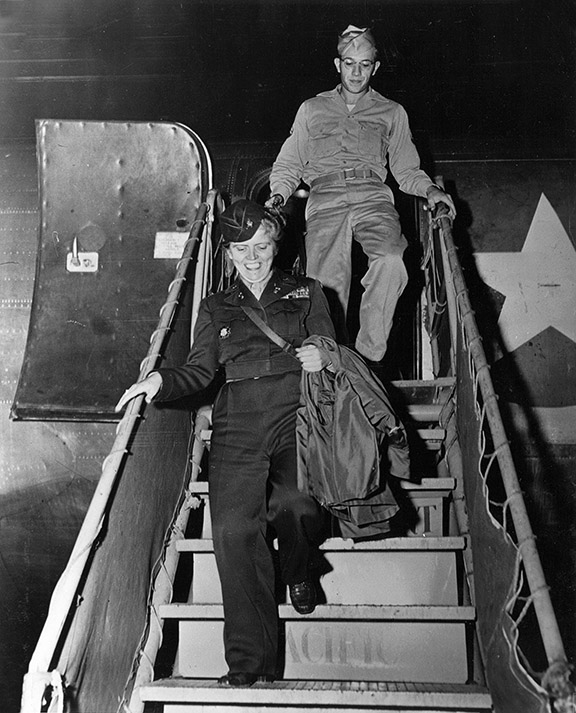
Col. Mary A. Hallaren, Director, WAC, arrives in Japan on a staff visit, 24 September 1947.

By the end of 1952, Hallaren had completed almost six years as director of the WAC. She had led the effort to obtain Regular Army and Reserve status for WACs. She had directed the procedures for assimilating WACs into the regular and reserve components between 1948 and 1950; supervised the revival of WAC recruiting and the opening of the WAC Training Center; and led the Corps through most of the Korean War. After leaving the directorship, she served on active duty for another seven years before retiring in 1960 at age 53. She was awarded the Legion of Merit, the Bronze Star, and the Army Commendation Medal. She served in the United States Department of Labor as director of the Women in Community Service division. She retired in 1978 but continued to serve in an advisory capacity.

== Later life ==
In the 1990s, she was a leading proponent of the Women In Military Service For America Memorial at Arlington National Cemetery, which was dedicated in 1997. She was inducted into the National Women's Hall of Fame in Seneca Falls, New York, in 1996 and was featured by Tom Brokaw in his book The Greatest Generation.

She died at the Arleigh Burke Pavilion, an assisted living facility for retired military personnel in McLean, Virginia. She is buried in Saint Patrick Cemetery in Lowell, Massachusetts.

== Awards ==
- Legion of Merit
- Bronze Star Medal
- Croix de Guerre
