= Hugh Cummiskey =

Leader of the Irish community in Lowell, Massachusetts

- Born: 1789; County Tyrone, Ireland
- Died: December 12, 1871 (age 82); Lowell, Massachusetts, United States
- Occupation: Labor leader
- Known for: Bringing Irish laborers to Lowell,. textile mills
- Spouse: Rose
- Children: Mary

Hugh Cummiskey (1789 – December 12, 1871) was a leader of the early Irish community in Lowell, Massachusetts in the United States.

Cummiskey was born in County Tyrone, Ireland, and immigrated to Massachusetts in 1817. Cummiskey, while working as a dock worker in Charlestown, Boston, led 30 Irishmen in search of work 30 miles from Charlestown along the Middlesex Canal to Lowell on April 6, 1822. Prior to this, Hugh had asked Kirk Boott for the work. They were received by Boott at Frye's Tavern where he gave then tools and some funds for food. Little provision was made for housing; the mill owners considered them temporary workers. (It wasn't until 1828 that Cummiskey made Lowell his permanent home) Cummiskey and his men began reconstruction on Pawtucket Canal on April 6, 1822.

In 1831, Cummiskey with other residents of the Paddy Camp Lands laid the foundation for first Catholic Church in Lowell - St. Patrick's. The building was done by the Irish as well as the funding.

Given Cummiskey's construction and leadership abilities first demonstrated at the Charlestown shipyard, it is easy to understand how came to be so popular both with the Irish and the Mill bosses. He was known for finding work for his men even in difficult times creating strong loyalty from his workers. He also experienced warm relations with Kirk Booth who originally hired him plus other mill officials such as Paul Moody and Luther Lawrence, mayor of Lowell. After their deaths, he called them friends.

When the community was experiencing disagreement and general rowdiness he asked the authorities to patrol At St Patrick's church on Sundays. Cummiskey was the only Catholic constable at the time. He also served the Catholic church by acting as the Lowell agent for the Boston Catholic newspaper The Pilot in the late 1830s. In 1833-1834 he was a key figure in the Irish Benevolent Society, a type of friendly society. When President Andrew Jackson visited Lowell on June 27, 1833 Cummiskey was an Assistant Marshal for the parade. In 1843-1844, he was a member of the Common Council.

And as he became even more wealthy, he continued to live in the Paddy Camp as did many other Irish middle class. In 1860, he described himself as "gentleman" with real estate worth $6,000 and personal property valued at $1,000. His purchase of land at Lowell and Merrimack streets was the first recorded land transaction between the Lock's and Canals. During the years 1831 and 1837 he added more land to his holdings on or near Lowell, Fenwick, Merrimack and Thorndike streets. At one point, he was one of the largest landowners in the Acre (including the Paddy Camp lands). In 1862, he offered his boarding house as the first hospital for the Irish.

Hugh died in 1871. There is no known image of Cummiskey.
